= 2026 United States House of Representatives election in Alaska =

2026 United States House of Representatives election in Alaska's at-large district
- November 3, 2026
- Turnout: 48.0%
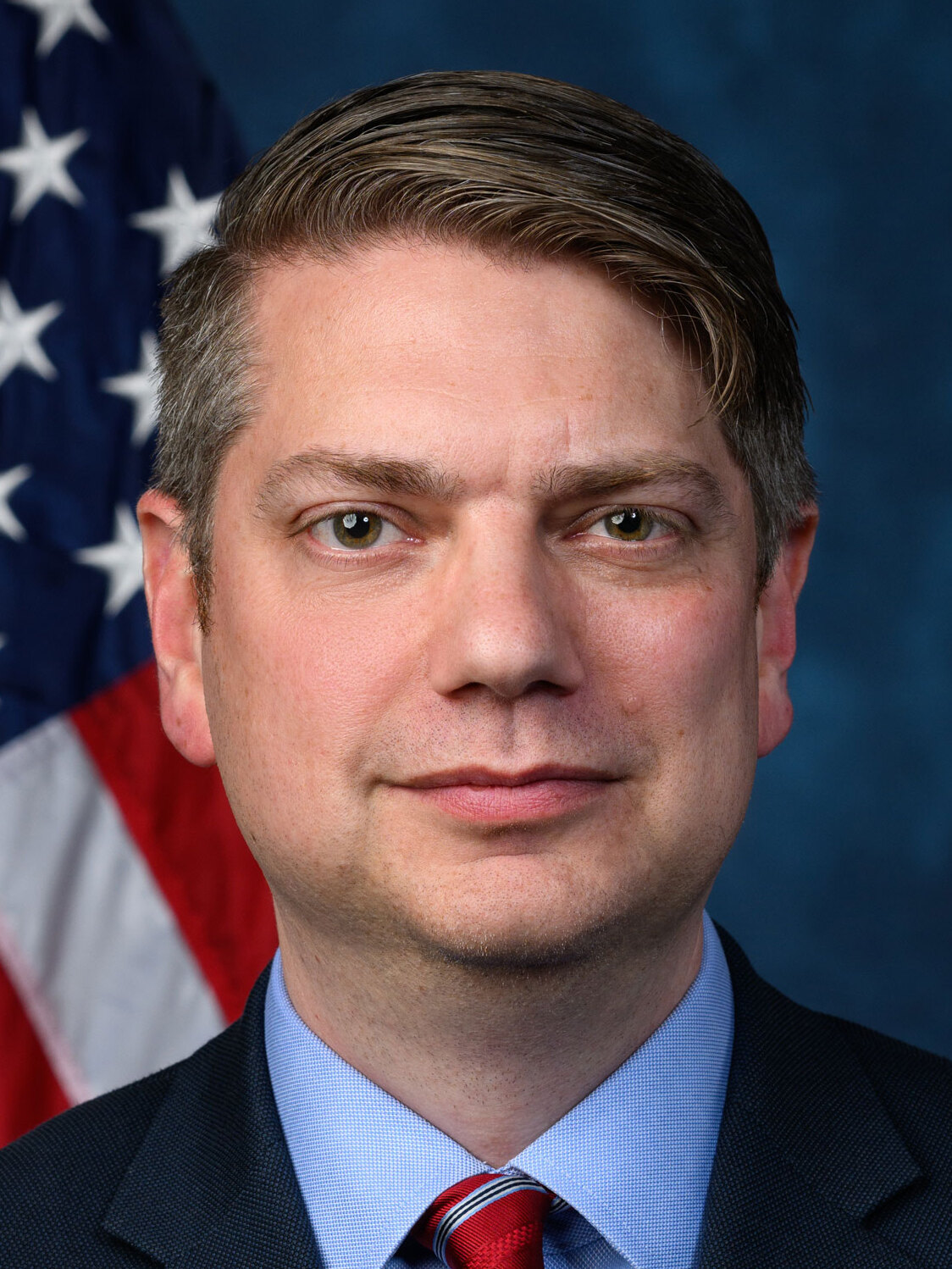

Candidate	Nick Begich III	Bill Hill	Eric Hafner
Party	Republican	Nonpartisan (Note: Alaska labels candidates not affiliated with a political party as "Nonpartisan".)	Democratic
First round	136,337; 47.53%	119,826; 41.77%	22,715; 7.92%
Maximum round	140,346; 51.35%	132,961; 48.65%	Eliminated
- Begich: 40–50% 50–60% 60–70% Hill: 40–50% 50–60% 60–70%
U.S. Representative before election
Nick Begich III
Republican
Elected U.S. Representative
Nick Begich III
Republican

The 2026 United States House of Representatives election in Alaska was held on November 3, 2026, to elect a member of the United States House of Representatives to represent the state of Alaska and its at-large district. The election coincided with other elections to the U.S. House, elections to the United States Senate, and various other state and local elections. The primary election occurred on August 18, 2026. Incumbent Nick Begich III won re-election to a second term, defeating his opponents Bill Hill and Eric Hafner. Begich did not received over 50% of the votes in the first round, triggering a ranked-choice voting tabulation. He won the tabulation with 51.35% of the vote.

Begich was elected with 51.22% of the vote in 2024, narrowly defeating then-incumbent Mary Peltola, the first Democrat to represent Alaska in the House since 1972.

The race was conducted using ranked-choice voting. The four candidates to advance from the August 18 nonpartisan primary and appear on the ballot for the November 3 general election were Begich, independent former Bristol Bay Borough School District superintendent Bill Hill, Democratic perennial candidate and federal prisoner Eric Hafner, and Libertarian business professor Jim McDermott.

== Candidates ==
=== Republican Party ===
==== Advanced to general ====
- Nick Begich III, incumbent U.S. representative (2025–present)

==== Withdrew after primary ====
- Clay Strickland

==== Eliminated in primary ====
- Eddie Goldfarb

==== Withdrawn ====
- Gerald L. Heikes, perennial candidate (running for U.S. Senate)

=== Democratic Party ===
==== Advanced to general ====
- Eric Hafner, federal prisoner, perennial candidate, and candidate for the same seat in 2024

==== Withdrew after primary ====
- John B. Williams
- Yaquelin Reynoso

==== Withdrawn ====
- Matt Schultz, pastor (remained on ballot, endorsed Hill)

==== Declined ====
- Mary Peltola, former U.S. representative (2022–2025) (running for U.S. Senate)

=== Libertarian Party ===
==== Advanced to general ====
- James C. "Jim" McDermott, business professor and three-time candidate for the same seat (Note: Libertarian nominee in 2012, 2014, and 2016)

==== Eliminated in primary ====
- John E. Foddrill Sr.

=== Nonpartisan candidates ===
==== Advanced to general ====
- Bill Hill, commercial fisherman and former superintendent of the Bristol Bay Borough School District

==== Eliminated in primary ====
- David Ambrose II
- Lady Donna Dutchess, religious leader and candidate for this district in 2022 (special and regular elections) and 2024
- David Richey
- Melanie A. Salazar
- Matthew "Bronco" Williams, teacher and Democratic candidate for Mississippi's 1st congressional district in 2024

== Primary election ==
=== Endorsements ===
Nick Begich (R)

Executive branch officials

- Donald Trump, president of the United States (2017–2021, 2025–present)

U.S. senators

- Dan Sullivan, Alaska (2015–present)

U.S. representatives

- Byron Donalds, FL-19 (2021–present)
- Mike Johnson, speaker of the House (2023–present) from LA-04 (2017–present)
- Steve Scalise, House majority leader (2023–present) from LA-01 (2008–present)
- Tom Emmer, House majority whip (2023–present) from MN-06 (2015–present)
- Lisa McClain, MI-09 (2021–present)
- Elise Stefanik, NY-21 (2015–present)
- Bruce Westerman, AR-04 (2015–present)

State legislators

- Jamie Allard, state representative from the 23rd district (2023–present)
- Ben Carpenter, former state representative from the 8th district (2019–2025)
- Mia Costello, former minority leader of the Alaska State Senate (2019) from district K (2015–2023)
- Mike Cronk, minority leader of the Alaska State Senate (2025–present) from district R (2025–present)
- Shelley Hughes, former minority leader of the Alaska State Senate (2023–2025) from district M (2017–2025)
- Pete Kelly, former president of the Alaska Senate (2017–2019) from district A (1999–2003, 2013–2019)
- Kevin McCabe, state representative from the 30th district (2021–present)
- Thomas McKay, former state representative from the 15th district (2021–2025)
- Dan Saddler, former majority leader of the Alaska House of Representatives (2023–2025) from the 24th district (2011–2018, 2023–present)
- Mike Shower, former minority leader of the Alaska State Senate (2025) from district O (2018–2025)
- Jesse Sumner, former state representative from the 28th district (2023–2025)
- Cathy Tilton, state senator from district M (2025–present)
- Frank Tomaszewski, state representative from the 34th district (2023–present)
- Sarah Vance, state representative from the 6th district (2019–present)

Individuals

- Vivek Ramaswamy, founder of Roivant Sciences

Organizations

- AIPAC
- Club for Growth PAC
- Freedom Caucus Fund
- National Federation of Independent Business
Bill Hill (NP)

State legislators

- Bryce Edgmon, speaker of the Alaska House of Representatives (2017–2019, 2019–2021, 2025–present) from the 37th district (2007–present)

Individuals

- Dan Osborn, former union leader and independent candidate for U.S. Senate in Nebraska in 2024 and 2026
- Matt Schultz, pastor and former candidate for this district (Democratic)

Labor unions

- Alaska AFL-CIO
- Alaska Professional Firefighters
- American Federation of Government Employees
- Association of Flight Attendants
- National Education Association
- UA Local 367
- United Brotherhood of Carpenters and Joiners of America

Organizations

- End Citizens United
Jim McDermott (L)

Political parties

- Alaska Libertarian Party
Matt Schultz (D) (withdrawn)

Statewide officials

- Tony Knowles, former governor of Alaska (1994–2002)
- Fran Ulmer, former lieutenant governor of Alaska (1994–2002)

State legislators

- Jennie Armstrong, former state representative from the 16th district (2023–2025)
- Tom Begich, former minority leader of the Alaska State Senate (2019–2023) from district J (2017–2023)
- Ashley Carrick, state representative from the 35th district (2023–present)
- Matt Claman, state senator from district H (2023–present)
- Forrest Dunbar, state senator from district J (2023–present)
- Hollis French, former state senator from district J (2013–2015)
- Alyse Galvin, state representative from the 14th district (2023–present) (Independent)
- Elvi Gray-Jackson, state senator from district G (2019–present)
- Andrew Gray, state representative from the 20th district (2023–present)
- Carolyn Hall, state representative from the 16th district (2025–present)
- Andrew Josephson, state representative from the 13th district (2013–present)
- Donna Mears, state representative from the 21st district (2023–present)
- Calvin Schrage, former minority leader of the Alaska House of Representatives (2023–2025) from the 12th district (2021–present) (Independent)
- Ivy Spohnholz, former state representative from the 16th district (2016–2023)
- Bill Wielechowski, state senator from district K (2007–present)

Local officials

- Austin Quinn-Davidson, former acting mayor of Anchorage (2020–2021) (Independent)
Declined to endorse

Political parties

- Alaska Democratic Party

=== Fundraising ===
Italics indicate a withdrawn candidate.

Campaign finance reports as of July 29, 2026
Candidate	Raised	Spent	Cash on hand
Nick Begich III (R)	$5,470,446	$2,455,619	$3,119,158
Bill Hill (NP)	$1,336,292	$820,406	$515,886
Source: Federal Election Commission

=== Polling ===
Poll source	Date(s) administered	Sample size (Note: Key: A – all adults RV – registered voters LV – likely voters V – unclear)	Margin of error	Nick Begich III (R)	Bill Hill (NP)	Matt Schultz (D)	Gavin Solomon (R)	Bronco Williams (U)	John Williams (D)	Other	Undecided
	July 17, 2026	Schultz withdraws									
The Bullfinch Group/Independent Center	July 13–16, 2026	705 (LV)	± 3.7%	46%	20%	32%	–	–	–	2%	–
Alaska Survey Research	May 14–17, 2026	1,401 (LV)	± 3.0%	47%	13%	28%	–	–	5%	7%	–
Alaska Survey Research	April 16–19, 2026	1,923 (LV)	± 2.5%	46%	11%	29%	4%	4%	6%	–	–
Change Research (D)	March 17–20, 2026	624 (LV)	± 4.5%	45%	13%	17%	–	–	4%	–	21% (Note: "Would not vote" with 3%)

=== Primary results ===
Primary results by state house district: Begich: 30–40%; 40–50%; 50–60%; 60–70%; Hill: 30–40%; 40–50%; 50–60%

Top-four primary results
Party	Candidate	Votes	%
Republican	Nick Begich III (incumbent)	72,696	44.6
Nonpartisan	Bill Hill	53,008	32.5
Democratic	Matt Schultz (withdrawn)	13,149	8.1
Democratic	Eric Hafner	6,175	3.8
Democratic	John B. Williams (withdrew)	4,413	2.7
Republican	Clay Strickland (withdrew)	3,681	2.3
Democratic	Yaquelin Reynoso (withdrew)	2,928	1.8
Libertarian	James C. "Jim" McDermott	1,951	1.2
Nonpartisan	Melanie A. Salazar	1,181	0.7
Republican	Eddie Goldfarb	943	0.6
Nonpartisan	Lady Donna Dutchess	715	0.4
Undeclared	Matthew "Bronco" Williams	632	0.4
Nonpartisan	David Richey	579	0.4
Nonpartisan	David Ambrose II	523	0.3
Libertarian	John E. Foddrill Sr.	358	0.2
Total votes		162,932	100.0

== General election ==
=== Campaign ===
After the primary, Democrat Matt Schultz—who had announced the suspension of his campaign weeks earlier—formally withdrew, as did Democrat John Williams, Republican Clay Strickland, and Democrat Yaquelin Reynoso. Schultz, Williams, Strickland, and Reynoso had placed third, fifth, sixth, and seventh in the primary, respectively. This left Libertarian candidate Jim McDermott as the fourth candidate on the general election ballot despite him having placed eighth in the primary. Williams confirmed that his decision to withdraw had come after conversations with Hill and Alaska Democratic Party representatives.

=== Predictions ===
Source	Ranking	As of
Decision Desk HQ	Lean R	October 27, 2026
The Cook Political Report	Lean R	October 23, 2026
Inside Elections	Likely R	October 1, 2025
Sabato's Crystal Ball	Lean R	October 27, 2026
The Economist	Lean R	May 6, 2026
Silver Bulletin	Likely R	October 3, 2026

=== Post-primary endorsements ===
Nick Begich (R)

Executive branch officials

- JD Vance, vice president of the United States (2025–present)

Newspapers

- Anchorage Daily News

Organizations

- Citizens for Responsible Energy Solutions
- National Federation of Independent Business
- NRA Political Victory Fund
- Safari Club International PAC
- Sealaska Corporation (co-endorsement with Hill)
Bill Hill (NP)

Statewide officials

- Bruce Botelho, former attorney general of Alaska (1994–2002) and former mayor of Juneau (1988–1991, 2003–2012) (Democratic)

U.S. representatives

- Suzan DelBene, WA-01 (2012–present) (Democratic)
- Adam Gray, CA-13 (2025–present) (Democratic)

Individuals

- Matthew Yglesias, journalist

Organizations

- Blue Dog PAC
- DCCC Red to Blue
- Planned Parenthood Action Fund
- Reproductive Freedom for All
- Sealaska Corporation (co-endorsement with Begich)

Political parties

- Alaska Democratic Party

=== Fundraising ===
Campaign finance reports as of October 14, 2026
Candidate	Raised	Spent	Cash on hand
Nick Begich III (R)	$6,438,904	$4,760,367	$1,782,867
Bill Hill (NP)	$2,630,793	$2,513,061	$117,732
Source: Federal Election Commission

=== Debates and forums ===
2026 United States House of Representatives election in Alaska debates
No.	Date	Host	Moderator	Link	Republican	Nonpartisan
Key: P Participant A Absent N Not invited I Invited W Withdrawn						
Key: P Participant A Absent N Not invited I Invited W Withdrawn					Begich	Hill
1	Aug. 27, 2026	Alaska Oil and Gas Association	Tara Sweeney	Vimeo	P	P
2	Sep. 12, 2026	Kodiak Chamber of Commerce; KMXT (FM)	Gary Stevens; Sara Fraser	YouTube	P	P
3	Oct. 14, 2026	Alaska Public Media; KTOO; Alaska's News Source	Lori Townsend; Liz Ruskin; Wil Courtney	YouTube	P	P

=== Polling ===
==== Ranked-choice polls ====
Poll source	Date(s) administered	Sample size	Margin of error	RCV round	Nick Begich III (R)	Bill Hill (NP)	Eric Hafner (D)	Jim McDermott (L)	Undecided / Not Ranked
Data for Progress (D)	October 8–16, 2026	694 (LV)	± 4.0%	BA	48%	42%	5%	1%	4% U
Data for Progress (D)	October 8–16, 2026	668 (LV)	± 4.0%	1	50%	43%	5%	1%	4% NR
Data for Progress (D)	October 8–16, 2026	668 (LV)	± 4.0%	2 (Note: Hypothetical continuation of elimination/distribution even though a candidate already exceeded 50%)	50%	45%	5%	–	4% NR
Data for Progress (D)	October 8–16, 2026	659 (LV)	± 4.0%	3	50%	49%	–	–	5% NR
Data for Progress (D)	October 8–16, 2026	668 (LV)	± 4.0%	3 (Note: Hypothetical scenario where voters who ranked Eric Hafner and whose vote is exhausted when those candidates are eliminated are instead distributed to Bill Hill)	50%	50%	–	–	4% NR
Alaska Survey Research	October 1–3, 2026	1,512 (LV)	± 3.0%	1	50%	40%	7%	3%	–
Alaska Survey Research	October 1–3, 2026	1,512 (LV)	± 3.0%	2	51%	42%	7%	–	–
Alaska Survey Research	October 1–3, 2026	1,512 (LV)	± 3.0%	3	53%	47%	–	–	–
New York Times/Siena University	September 24 – October 1, 2026	504 (LV)	± 5.1%	BA	47%	35%	8%	5%	5% U
New York Times/Siena University	September 24 – October 1, 2026	504 (LV)	± 5.1%	1	49%	37%	9%	6%	–
New York Times/Siena University	September 24 – October 1, 2026	504 (LV)	± 5.1%	2	51%	39%	10%	–	–
New York Times/Siena University	September 24 – October 1, 2026	504 (LV)	± 5.1%	3	53%	47%	–	–	–
Fabrizio Ward (R)/ Impact Research (D) (Note: Poll sponsored by AARP)	September 8–11, 2026	800 (LV)	± 3.5%	BA	45%	31%	9%	3%	11% U
Fabrizio Ward (R)/ Impact Research (D)	September 8–11, 2026	800 (LV)	± 3.5%	1	51%	35%	11%	4%	11% NR
Fabrizio Ward (R)/ Impact Research (D)	September 8–11, 2026	800 (LV)	± 3.5%	2	53%	36%	11%	–	12% NR
Fabrizio Ward (R)/ Impact Research (D)	September 8–11, 2026	800 (LV)	± 3.5%	3	57%	43%	–	–	18% NR

==== First-past-the-post polls ====
Poll source	Date(s) administered	Sample size	Margin of error	Nick Begich III (R)	Bill Hill (NP)	Eric Hafner (D)	Jim McDermott (L)	Other	Undecided
AtlasIntel	October 28 – November 1, 2026	522 (LV)	± 4.0%	47%	47%	6%	0%	1% (Note: "Others" with 1%)	–
Data for Progress (D) (Note: First-choice results from a ranked-choice poll)	October 8–16, 2026	694 (LV)	± 4.0%	48%	42%	5%	1%	–	4%
Public Policy Polling (D)	October 14–15, 2026	578 (RV)	–	45%	44%	5%	2%	–	4%
Alaska Survey Research	October 1–3, 2026	1,512 (LV)	± 3.0%	50%	40%	7%	3%	–	–
New York Times/Siena University	September 24 – October 1, 2026	504 (LV)	± 5.1%	47%	35%	8%	5%	–	5%
Fabrizio Ward (R)/ Impact Research (D)	September 8–11, 2026	800 (LV)	± 3.5%	45%	31%	9%	3%	–	11%
Bullfinch Group (Note: Poll sponsored by the Independent Leadership Council)	September 1–6, 2026	820 (LV)	± 3.4%	44%	37%	7%	2%	–	10%
Bullfinch Group	September 1–6, 2026	739 (LV)	–	50%	47%	–	–	3% (Note: 3% exhausted ballots/no further preference)	–
	August 18, 2026	Primary election held							
GBAO (D) (Note: Poll sponsored by Hill's campaign)	August 3–5, 2026	500 (LV)	± 4.4%	46%	42%	–	–	–	12%
Data for Progress (D)	July 28 – August 4, 2026	605 (LV)	± 4.0%	47%	37%	–	–	12% (Note: "I would rank neither" with 12%)	4%
Tavern Research (D)	May 18–27, 2026	452 (LV)	± 7.2%	52%	48%	–	–	–	–
Public Policy Polling (D) (Note: Poll sponsored by Hill's campaign.)	February 11–12, 2026	600 (LV)	± 4.0%	41%	37%	–	–	–	22%

Hypothetical polling

Nick Begich vs. Bill Hill vs. Eric Hafner vs. Clay Strickland

Poll source	Date(s) administered	Sample size	Margin of error	RCV round	Nick Begich III (R)	Bill Hill (NP)	Eric Hafner (D)	Clay Strickland (R)	Undecided / Not Ranked
Alaska Survey Research	August 2–5, 2026	1,371 (LV)	± 3.0%	1	48%	33%	15%	4%	–
Alaska Survey Research	August 2–5, 2026	1,371 (LV)	± 3.0%	2	50%	34%	15%	–	–
Alaska Survey Research	August 2–5, 2026	1,371 (LV)	± 3.0%	3	53.5%	46.5%	–	–	–

Nick Begich vs. Bill Hill vs. John Williams vs. Eric Hafner

Poll source	Date(s) administered	Sample size	Margin of error	RCV round	Nick Begich III (R)	Bill Hill (NP)	John Williams (D)	Eric Hafner (D)	Undecided / Not Ranked
Alaska Survey Research	August 20–23, 2026	1,872 (LV)	± 3.0%	1	51%	39%	6%	5%	–

Nick Begich III vs. Matt Schultz

Poll source	Date(s) administered	Sample size	Margin of error	Nick Begich III (R)	Matt Schultz (D)	Other	Undecided
New York Times/Siena University	June 15–29, 2026	593 (LV)	± 4.9%	51%	39%	1%	9%
Tavern Research (D)	May 18–27, 2026	452 (LV)	± 7.2%	55%	45%	–	–
Public Policy Polling (D)	February 11–12, 2026	600 (LV)	± 4.0%	46%	39%	–	15%
Data for Progress (D)	October 17–23, 2025	823 (LV)	± 3.0%	48%	37%	8% (Note: "I would rank neither" with 8%)	7%

Nick Begich III vs. Mary Peltola

Poll source	Date(s) administered	Sample size	Margin of error	Nick Begich III (R)	Mary Peltola (D)	Other	Undecided
Data for Progress (D)	February 28 – March 7, 2025	1,000 (LV)	± 3.0%	46%	46%	5% (Note: "I would rank neither" with 5%)	3%

Nick Begich III vs. Generic Democrat

Poll source	Date(s) administered	Sample size	Margin of error	Nick Begich III (R)	Generic Democrat (D)	Other	Undecided
Tavern Research (D)	May 18–27, 2026	452 (LV)	± 7.2%	55%	45%	–	–

Generic Republican vs. generic Democrat

Poll source	Date(s) administered	Sample size	Margin of error	Generic Republican	Generic Democrat	Undecided
Data for Progress (D)	July 21–27, 2025	678 (LV)	± 4.0%	48%	38%	13%

=== Results ===
2026 Alaska's at-large congressional district election
Party	Candidate	First choice		Round 1			Round 2			Round 3	
Party	Candidate	Votes	%	Votes	%	Transfer	Votes	%	Transfer	Votes	%
Republican	Nick Begich III (incumbent)	136,337	47.53%	136,658	47.56%	+2,061	138,719	48.71%	+1,627	140,346	51.35%
Independent	Bill Hill	119,826	41.77%	120,156	41.82%	+2,112	122,268	42.93%	+10,693	132,961	48.65%
Democratic	Eric Hafner	22,715	7.92%	22,874	7.96%	+942	23,816	8.36%	-23,816	Eliminated	
Libertarian	James C. "Jim" McDermott	7,543	2.63%	7,649	2.66%	-7,649	Eliminated				
Write-in		439	0.15%	Eliminated							
Total votes		290,323		287,337			284,803			273,307	
Inactive ballots (Note: Includes overvotes, undervotes, and exhausted ballots where another candidate was not ranked.)				2,986		+2,534	5,520		+11,496	17,016	
Turnout										290,323	47.95
Registered voters										605,433	
Republican hold											

== Notes ==
Partisan clients
