= 2026 Alaska gubernatorial election =

- November 3, 2026
- Turnout: 47.95% ▲3.55 pp
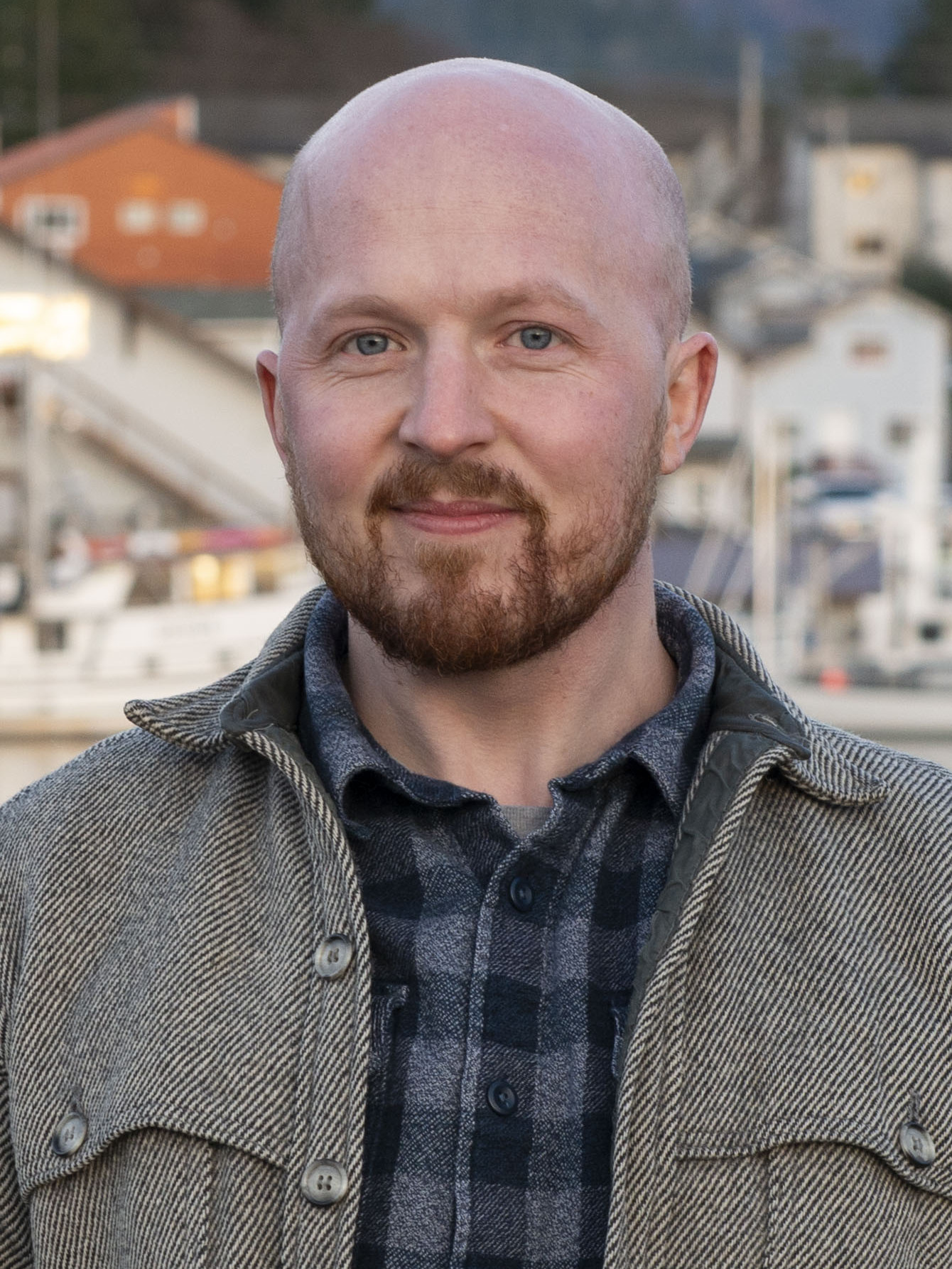

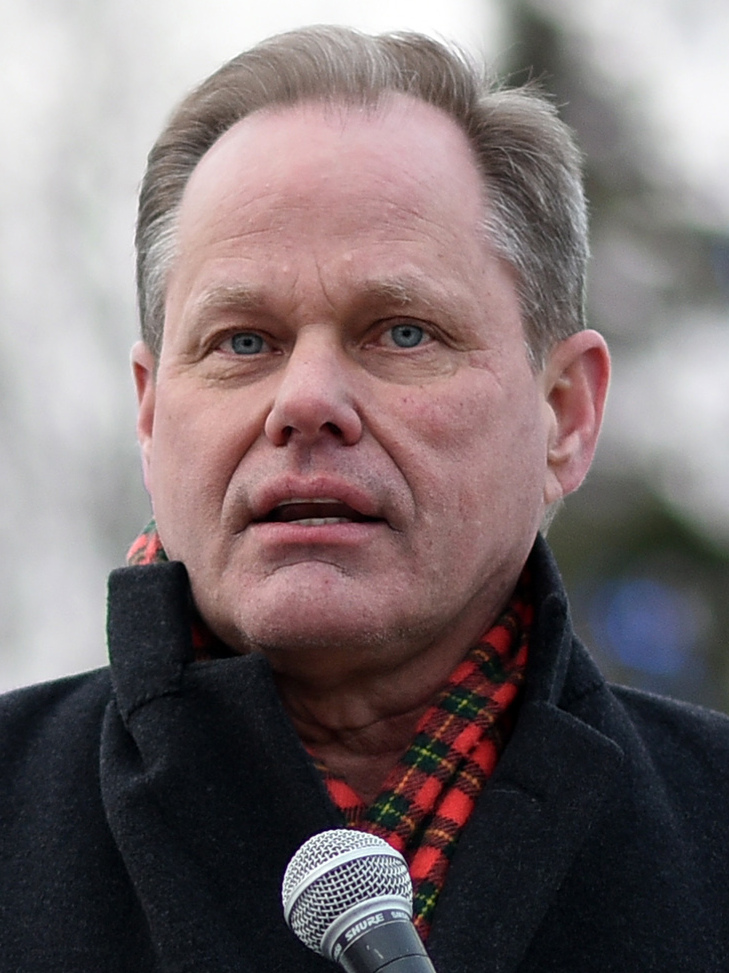

Candidate	Jonathan Kreiss-Tomkins	Bernadette Wilson
Party	Democratic	Republican
Running mate	Zac Johnson	Mike Shower
Popular vote	145,449	79,336
Percentage	51.08%	27.86%
Candidate	Dave Bronson	Treg Taylor
Party	Republican	Republican
Running mate	Josh Church	Candice English
Popular vote	38,767	20,368
Percentage	13.62%	7.15%
- Results by State House District; Kreiss-Tomkins: 30–40% 40–50% 50–60% 60–70% 70–80% Wilson: 30–40% 40–50%
Governor before election
Mike Dunleavy
Republican
Elected Governor
Jonathan Kreiss-Tomkins
Democratic

The 2026 Alaska gubernatorial election took place on November 3, 2026, to elect the next governor and lieutenant governor of Alaska. A nonpartisan top-four primary election occurred on August 18, 2026, in which four candidates advanced to a ranked-choice general election, held using instant-runoff voting. Incumbent governor Mike Dunleavy was term-limited and ineligible to seek a third consecutive term.

Democratic former state representative Jonathan Kreiss-Tomkins won the election with an outright majority in the first-choice vote, becoming the first Democrat to be elected governor of Alaska since Tony Knowles in 1998. Kreiss-Tomkins is only the third Governor of Alaska to be born in the state (after William A. Egan and Bill Walker), and the first to be born in the state after it achieved statehood.

== Candidates ==
=== Republican Party ===
==== Advanced to general ====
- Dave Bronson, former mayor of Anchorage (2021–2024)
  - Running mate: Josh Church, financial professional
- Bernadette Wilson, waste management company founder and conservative activist
  - Running mate: Mike Shower, former minority leader of the Alaska Senate (2025) from district O (2018–2025)
- Treg Taylor, former Alaska Attorney General (2021–2025)
  - Running mate: Candice English, oil and gas support business owner

==== Eliminated in primary ====
- Click Bishop, former state senator from district R (2013–2025) (Note: Also filed paperwork to withdraw after primary)
  - Running mate: Greta Schuerch, member of the NANA Regional Corporation board of directors (Independent)
- Adam Crum, former commissioner of the Alaska Department of Revenue
  - Running mate: Robert Craig, former healthcare executive
- Edna DeVries, mayor of Matanuska-Susitna Borough (2021–present)
  - Running mate: George Hightower, retired physician
- Michael Loren Gilbert
  - Running mate: Timothy Hickel
- Matt Heilala, member of the Alaska State Medical Board (2021–present)
  - Running mate: Jesse Sumner, former state representative from the 28th district (2023–2025)
- Shelley Hughes, former majority leader of the Alaska Senate (2021–2023) from district M (2017–2025)
  - Running mate: Blake Gettys, retired U.S. Air Force brigadier general
- Henry R. "Hank" Kroll, author
  - Running mate: Tommy R. Nicholson III (Independent)
- Lesil McGuire, former state senator from district K (2007–2017) (endorsed Kreiss-Tomkins)
  - Running mate: Elizabeth Rexford, legislative staffer
- James W. "JP4" Parkin, lab technician and retired educator (ran as write-in candidate in the general election)
  - Running mate: Ramadhani "Ram" Greer, general contractor (Democratic)

==== Withdrawn ====
- Nancy Dahlstrom, Lieutenant Governor of Alaska (2022–present) and candidate for Alaska's at-large congressional district in 2024

==== Declined ====
- Lisa Murkowski, U.S. Senator (2002–present) and daughter of former governor Frank Murkowski

==== Fundraising ====
Italics indicate a withdrawn or disqualified candidate

Campaign finance reports as of February 1, 2026
Candidate	Raised	Spent	Cash on hand
Click Bishop (R)	$283,606	$163,347	$130,259
Dave Bronson (R)	$217,284	$87,219	$130,065
Adam Crum (R)	$347,986	$168,245	$179,741
Nancy Dahlstrom (R)	$17,810	$12,930	$4,880
Edna DeVries (R)	$10,986	$5,617	$9,359
Matt Heilala (R)	$1,364,237	$354,757	$1,009,480
Shelley Hughes (R)	$306,510	$147,798	$158,712
Henry Kroll (R)	$0	$0	$0
James Parkin (R)	$1,799	$1,668	$131
Treg Taylor (R)	$880,310	$155,679	$724,631
Bruce Walden (R)	$2,192	$0	$2,192
Bernadette Wilson (R)	$305,985	$241,190	$64,794
Source: Alaska Public Offices Commission

=== Democratic Party ===
==== Advanced to general ====
- Jonathan Kreiss-Tomkins, former state representative from the 35th district (2013–2023)
  - Running mate: Zac Johnson, Anchorage assemblymember for the 6th district (Independent)

==== Withdrew after advancing to general ====
- Tom Begich, former Minority Leader of the Alaska Senate (2019–2023) from district J (2017–2023) and uncle of U.S. Representative Nick Begich III (endorsed Kreiss-Tomkins)
  - Running mate: Julia Hnilicka, former Alaska state director for USDA Rural Development and nominee for Alaska's 6th house district in 2020

==== Withdrawn ====
- Matt Claman, state senator from district H (2023–present) (endorsed Kreiss-Tomkins)
  - Running mate: Sarah Skeel, former chief administrative officer of Providence Alaska Medical Center

==== Declined ====
- Mary Peltola, former U.S. Representative from Alaska's at-large congressional district (2022–2025) (running for U.S. Senate)

==== Fundraising ====
Campaign finance reports as of August 8, 2026
Candidate	Raised	Spent	Cash on hand
Tom Begich (D)	$1,195,970	$1,078,770	$117,199
Jonathan Kreiss-Tomkins (D)	$2,170,998	$1,861,062	$309,935
Source: Alaska Public Offices Commission

=== Independents ===
==== Eliminated in primary ====
- Meda DeWitt, community organizer and traditional healer (ran as write-in candidate in the general election)
  - Running mate: Christopher Steere, Dewitt's campaign manager
- Destry J. Payne Sr., welder-fabricator
  - Running mate: Cliff Silvers, mechanic
- Bill Walker, former governor of Alaska (2014–2018) and candidate for governor in 2010 and 2022
  - Running mate: Randy Hoffbeck, former commissioner of the Alaska Department of Revenue

== Primary election ==
=== Campaign ===
The primary featured a crowded field of 17 candidates. Candidates at times struggled to distinguish themselves, while Alaska's nonpartisan primary and ranked-choice voting system were credited with encouraging more positive campaigning. As a result, candidates often emphasized areas of agreement, particularly with members of their own party.

Republican Bernadette Wilson called on Republican candidates to withdraw if they advanced to the general election but received fewer votes than another Republican, though she was the only candidate to pledge to do so herself. Democrats Tom Begich and Jonathan Kreiss-Tomkins similarly discussed the possibility of one withdrawing after the primary to consolidate Democratic support behind the other.

The race also saw heavy spending. Republicans Treg Taylor and Matt Heilala, the party's two highest-spending candidates, largely self-funded their campaigns. Heilala contributed $1.4 million to his campaign, while Taylor contributed $600,000. Taylor's contribution violated an Alaska campaign finance deadline, though he argued that the restriction was unconstitutional.

Kreiss-Tomkins spent more than any other candidate and reported the largest number of individual Alaskan contributors, although most of his funding came from outside the state, including employees of Anthropic and others connected to the artificial intelligence industry. Begich raised approximately $1.2 million, more than half of which came from two wealthy Alaskan donors.

=== Endorsements ===
Tom Begich (D)

Statewide officials

- Fran Ulmer, former lieutenant governor of Alaska (1994–2002)

Labor unions

- International Brotherhood of Electrical Workers Local 1547 (co-endorsement with Bishop)
- National Education Association-Alaska (co-endorsement with Bishop and Kreiss-Tomkins)

Organizations

- Planned Parenthood Alliance Advocates Alaska
Click Bishop (R)

Labor unions

- Alaska AFL-CIO
- International Brotherhood of Electrical Workers Local 1547 (co-endorsement with Begich)
- National Education Association-Alaska (co-endorsement with Begich and Kreiss-Tomkins)
Dave Bronson (R)

Party chapters

- Alaska Republican Party District 6 (co-endorsement with Hughes and Wilson)
Shelley Hughes (R)

Party chapters

- Alaska Republican Party District 6 (co-endorsement with Bronson and Wilson)
Jonathan Kreiss-Tomkins (D)

Governors

- Tony Knowles, former governor of Alaska (1994–2002)

State legislators

- Forrest Dunbar, state senator from district J (2023–present)
- Jennie Armstrong, former state representative from the 13th district (2023–2025)
- Matt Claman, state senator from district H (2023–present) and withdrawn candidate in this election
- Robyn Frier, state representative from the 40th district (2025–present)
- Zack Fields, state representative from the 20th district (2019–2023) and 17th district (2023–present)
- Rebecca Himschoot, state representative from the 2nd district (2023–present)
- Dan Ortiz, former state representative from the 36th district (2015–2023) and 1st district (2023–2025) (Independent)
- Calvin Schrage, state representative from the 25th district (2021–2023) and the 12th district (2023–Present) (Independent)

Local officials

- Mike Navarre, former mayor of Kenai Peninsula Borough (1996–1999; 2011–2017) and former state representative from the 5A district and 9th district (1985–1996)

Labor unions

- National Education Association-Alaska (co-endorsement with Begich and Bishop)
Bernadette Wilson (R)

U.S. representatives

- Byron Donalds, FL-19 (2021–present)

Statewide officials

- Craig Campbell, former lieutenant governor of Alaska (2009–2010)

Party officials

- Morton Blackwell, RNC committeeman from Virginia (1988–present) and former Reagan White House official

Party chapters

- Alaska Republican Party District 6 (co-endorsement with Bronson and Hughes)

=== Polling ===
Poll source	Date(s) administered	Sample size (Note: Key: A – all adults RV – registered voters LV – likely voters V – unclear)	Margin of error	Tom Begich (D)	Click Bishop (R)	Dave Bronson (R)	Matt Claman (D)	Nancy Dahlstrom (R)	Jonathan Kreiss-Tomkins (D)	Bill Walker (I)	Bernadette Wilson (R)	Other	Undecided
Change Research (D) (Note: Poll sponsored by Kreiss-Tomkins's campaign.)	July 17–19, 2026	604 (LV)	–	17%	4%	6%	–	–	15%	7%	14%	10% (Note: "Another Candidate" with 6%; Adam Crum (R) with 4%)	27%
Alaska Survey Research	June 30 – July 1, 2026	1,528 (RV)	± 2.7%	20%	9%	11%	–	–	12%	9%	15%	24% (Note: Adam Crum (R) with 7%; Shelly Hughes (R) with 5%)	
	June 27, 2026	Claman withdraws from the race											
Public Policy Polling (D)	June 24–25, 2026	529 (LV)	± 4.2%	16%	10%	13%	3%	–	13%	8%	12%	25%	
	June 1, 2026	Dahlstrom withdraws from the race											
	June 1, 2026	Walker enters the race											
Alaska Survey Research	May 14–17, 2026	1,401 (LV)	± 3.0%	21%	10%	11%	7%	6%	8%	–	16%	22%	
Dittman Research (Note: Poll sponsored by Bronson's campaign)	April 27–30, 2026	451 (LV)	–	21%	6%	7%	5%	2%	5%	–	6%	13% (Note: Treg Taylor (R) with 5%; Adam Crum (R) with 4%; Shelly Hughes (R) and Matt Heilala (R) with 2%)	35%
Alaska Survey Research	April 16–19, 2026	1,612 (LV)	± 2.5%	19%	9%	10%	– (Note: All 13 other candidates have less than 9% and more than 0%)	–	–	–	14%	48%	
Alaska Survey Research	March 19–22, 2026	1,061 (LV)	± 3.0%	19%	– (Note: All 13 other candidates have less than 10% and more than 0%)	10%	10%	–	–	–	14%	47%	
Lake Research Partners (D) (Note: Poll sponsored by Begich's campaign.)	February 5–11, 2026	600 (LV)	± 4.0%	22%	6%	8%	6%	5%	9%	–	14%	8% (Note: Shelly Hughes (R) with 4%; Matt Heilala (R) and Treg Taylor (R) with 2%)	23%

Hypothetical polling

with Mary Peltola

Poll source	Date(s) administered	Sample size	Margin of error	Tom Begich (D)	Click Bishop (R)	Adam Crum (R)	Nancy Dahlstrom (R)	Edna DeVries (R)	Mary Peltola (D)	Treg Taylor (R)	Bernadette Wilson (R)	Undecided
Data for Progress (D)	July 21–27, 2025	678 (LV)	± 4.0%	6%	6%	4%	10%	2%	40%	3%	11%	18%

"Republican Primary Poll" (Note: Survey asked only Republican voters. In Alaska, all candidates run on the same ballot in a "blanket primary.")

Poll source	Date(s) administered	Sample size	Margin of error	Nancy Dahlstrom (R)	Mary Peltola (D)	Bernadette Wilson (R)	Other	Undecided
Cygnal (R) (Note: Poll sponsored by the Building Alaska PAC)	July 24–27, 2025	500 (LV)	–	11%	9%	17%	6%	57%

=== Results ===
Results by state house district: Kreiss-Tomkins: 10–20%; 20–30%; 30–40%; 40–50%; Begich: 10–20%; 20–30%; 30–40%; Wilson: 10–20%; Bronson: 10–20%; Bishop: 30–40%; Hughes: 10–20%

Results by precinct: Begich: 10–20%; 20–30%; 30–40%; 40–50%; 50–60%; 70–100%; Kreiss-Tomkins: 10–20%; 20–30%; 30–40%; 40–50%; 50–60%; Wilson: 20–30%; 30–40%; Bronson: 10–20%; 20–30%; Walker: 10–20%; 20–30%; 30–40%; Taylor: 10–20%; 30–40%; Bishop: 10–20%; 20–30%; 30–40%; 40–50%; 50–60%; 70–100%; Crum: 10–20%; Hughes: 10–20%; 20–30%

Top-four primary results
Party	Candidate	Votes	%
Democratic	Jonathan Kreiss-Tomkins Zac Johnson	37,006	22.5
Democratic	Tom Begich (withdrew) Julia Hnilicka (withdrew)	34,172	20.8
Republican	Bernadette Wilson Mike Shower	16,468	10.0
Republican	Dave Bronson Josh Church	13,364	8.1
Republican	Treg Taylor Candice English	11,928	7.3
Republican	Click Bishop (withdrew) Greta Schuerch (withdrew)	11,527	7.0
Republican	Adam Crum Robert Craig	8,922	5.4
Republican	Shelley Hughes Blake Gettys	8,776	5.4
Independent	Bill Walker Randy Hoffbeck	7,341	4.5
Republican	Matt Heilala Jesse Sumner (withdrew)	4,330	2.6
Independent	Meda DeWitt Christopher Steere	4,184	2.5
Republican	Edna DeVries George Hightower	2,167	1.3
Republican	Lesil McGuire Elizabeth Rexford	2,098	1.3
Republican	Michael Loren Gilbert Timothy Hickel	675	0.4
Republican	James W. "JP4" Parkin Ramadhani "Ram" Greer	638	0.4
Independent	Destry J. Payne Sr. Cliff Silvers	372	0.2
Republican	Henry R. "Hank" Kroll Tommy R. Nicholson III	335	0.2
Total votes		164,303	100.0

== General election ==
=== Campaign ===
After initially finishing second in the primary, Begich withdrew and endorsed Kreiss-Tomkins, allowing fifth-place finisher Taylor to advance to the general election. However, the Alaska Public Offices Commission recommended against certifying Taylor's candidacy after finding that his financial disclosure did not substantially comply with state law. On August 31, Lieutenant Governor Nancy Dahlstrom declined to certify Taylor, temporarily elevating his running mate, Candice English, to the gubernatorial nomination; English subsequently selected Taylor's wife, Jodi Taylor, as her running mate. On September 4, Dahlstrom reversed her decision and announced that Taylor would be certified after a preliminary review by the Alaska Department of Law raised questions about whether the financial disclosure requirements had been applied consistently.

In the general election campaign, Taylor softened his messaging and attempted to appeal to independent and Democratic voters. Kreiss-Tomkins pledged that Democrats, Republicans, and independents would be equally represented in his cabinet and emphasized endorsements from moderate Republicans. In contrast, Wilson criticized bipartisanship and said that bipartisan coalitions in the Alaska legislature had been ineffective.

Taylor and Bronson called upon Republican voters to rank all three Republicans in the race, while Wilson urged her supporters not to rank other candidates and renewed her calls for the other Republicans to drop out.

While the three Republican candidates generally agreed on most issues, including opposition to new taxation proposals from Kreiss-Tomkins, Wilson was alone in advocating for a return to paying out full Permanent Fund dividends according to the statutory formula. Incumbent governor Mike Dunleavy had made a similar promise during his 2018 campaign, but his efforts to implement the proposal had been unsuccessful. In fact, dividends reached a record low during Dunleavy's administration. The other candidates argued that following the statutory formula would be unaffordable for the foreseeable future.

The candidates also diverged on the issue of data centers. Bronson and Taylor were generally supportive of data centers, portraying them as an economic opportunity provided they generated their own electricity and did not drive up energy costs. Despite receiving large campaign contributions from donors connected to the artificial intelligence industry, Kreiss-Tomkins advocated for a moratorium on data center construction until a regulatory framework could be developed. He also supported regulation of artificial intelligence more broadly. Wilson also opposed data centers, highlighting their environmental impact and arguing that Kreiss-Tomkins could not be trusted on the issue.

=== Predictions ===
Source	Ranking	As of
The Cook Political Report	Lean D (flip)	October 29, 2026
Decision Desk HQ	Lean D (flip)	November 3, 2026
Fox News	Tossup	November 1, 2026
Inside Elections	Tilt D (flip)	October 29, 2026
NBC News	Lean D (flip)	November 3, 2026
RealClearPolitics	Lean D (flip)	November 1, 2026
Sabato's Crystal Ball	Likely D (flip)	November 2, 2026
Silver Bulletin	Likely D (flip)	November 3, 2026

=== Post-primary endorsements ===
Jonathan Kreiss-Tomkins (D)

U.S. senators

- Lisa Murkowski, Alaska (2002–present) (Republican)

Statewide officials

- Frank Murkowski, former governor of Alaska (2002–2006) and former U.S. senator (1981–2002) (Republican)
- Bill Walker, former governor of Alaska (2014–2018) and primary candidate in this election (Independent)

State legislators

- Jim Duncan, former state representative (1975-1986), Speaker of the House (1981–1982), and state senator (1987–1998)
- Lesil McGuire, former state senator from district K (2007–2017) and former gubernatorial candidate (Republican)
- Rick Halford, former senate president (1993–1994, 2001–2003), state senator (1983–2003), and state representative (1978–1983) (Republican)
- Tom Begich, former senate minority leader (2019–2023) from district J (2017–2023) and former gubernatorial candidate

Individuals

- Julia Hnilicka, former Alaska state director for USDA Rural Development and former lieutenant gubernatorial candidate (Begich's running mate)

Labor unions

- Alaska AFL-CIO
- International Brotherhood of Electrical Workers Local 1547
- International Union of Painters and Allied Trades District Council 5, Alaska Local 1959
- Plumbers & Steamfitters UA Local 367
- Alaska Professional Firefighters Association
- Public Safety Employees Association Local 803
- Teamsters Local 959
- United Auto Workers Region 6 PAC/Alaska Graduate Workers Association
- Western States Carpenters Union

Organizations

- Democrats for Education Reform
- Democratic Governors Association
- Planned Parenthood Alliance Advocates Alaska
- Sealaska Corporation

Political parties

- Alaska Democratic Party

Newspapers

- Anchorage Daily News
Bernadette Wilson (R)

Executive branch officials

- Donald Trump, president of the United States (2017–2021, 2025–present)

U.S. representatives

- Nick Begich III, AK-AL (2025–present)

State legislators

- Shelley Hughes, former majority leader of the Alaska Senate (2021–2023) from district M (2017–2025) and former gubernatorial candidate
Declined to endorse

Statewide officials

- Mike Dunleavy, incumbent governor (2018–present)
- Sarah Palin, former governor of Alaska (2006–2009)
- Sean Parnell, former governor of Alaska (2009–2014)

Party officials

- Carmela Warfield, chair of the Alaska Republican Party

Political parties

- Alaska Republican Party

=== Polling ===
==== Ranked-choice polls ====
Poll source	Date(s) administered	Sample size	Margin of error	RCV round	Bernadette Wilson (R)	Jonathan Kreiss-Tomkins (D)	Dave Bronson (R)	Treg Taylor (R)	Undecided / Not Ranked
Alaska Survey Research	October 23–25, 2026	1,068 (LV)	± 3.5%	1	31%	51%	12%	7%	—
Alaska Survey Research	October 23–25, 2026	1,068 (LV)	± 3.5%	2 (Note: Hypothetical continuation of elimination/distribution even though a candidate already exceeded 50%)	34%	51%	15%	—	—
Alaska Survey Research	October 23–25, 2026	1,068 (LV)	± 3.5%	3	47%	53%	—	—	—
Alaska Survey Research	October 15–18, 2026	1,568 (LV)	± 3.0%	1	30%	50%	12%	8%	—
Alaska Survey Research	October 15–18, 2026	1,568 (LV)	± 3.0%	2	33%	51%	16%	—	—
Alaska Survey Research	October 15–18, 2026	1,568 (LV)	± 3.0%	3	45%	55%	—	—	—
Data for Progress (D)	October 8–16, 2026	694 (LV)	± 4.0%	BA	28%	46%	12%	9%	5% U
Data for Progress (D)	October 8–16, 2026	660 (LV)	± 4.0%	1	29%	49%	12%	9%	5% NR
Data for Progress (D)	October 8–16, 2026	648 (LV)	± 4.0%	2	33%	50%	17%	—	7% NR
Data for Progress (D)	October 8–16, 2026	629 (LV)	± 4.0%	3	47%	53%	—	—	9% NR
Data for Progress (D)	October 8–16, 2026	660 (LV)	± 4.0%	3 (Note: Hypothetical scenario where voters who ranked Dave Bronson or Treg Taylor and whose vote is exhausted when those candidates are eliminated are instead distributed to Bernadette Wilson)	50%	50%	—	—	5% NR
Alaska Survey Research	October 1–3, 2026	1,512 (LV)	± 3.0%	1	27%	48%	15%	10%	—
Alaska Survey Research	October 1–3, 2026	1,512 (LV)	± 3.0%	2	30%	50%	20%	—	—
Alaska Survey Research	October 1–3, 2026	1,512 (LV)	± 3.0%	3	46%	54%	—	—	—
New York Times/Siena University	September 24 – October 1, 2026	504 (LV)	± 5.1%	BA	20%	40%	15%	11%	13% U
New York Times/Siena University	September 24 – October 1, 2026	504 (LV)	± 5.1%	1	24%	46%	17%	13%	—
New York Times/Siena University	September 24 – October 1, 2026	504 (LV)	± 5.1%	2	31%	48%	22%	—	—
New York Times/Siena University	September 24 – October 1, 2026	504 (LV)	± 5.1%	3	48%	52%	—	—	—
Fabrizio Ward (R)/ Impact Research (D) (Note: Poll sponsored by AARP)	September 8–11, 2026	800 (LV)	± 3.5%	BA	20%	40%	14%	7%	18% U
Fabrizio Ward (R)/ Impact Research (D)	September 8–11, 2026	800 (LV)	± 3.5%	1	25%	49%	18%	8%	18% NR
Fabrizio Ward (R)/ Impact Research (D)	September 8–11, 2026	800 (LV)	± 3.5%	2	28%	50%	21%	—	19% NR
Fabrizio Ward (R)/ Impact Research (D)	September 8–11, 2026	800 (LV)	± 3.5%	3	45%	55%	—	—	25% NR

==== First-past-the-post polls ====
Poll source	Date(s) administered	Sample size	Margin of error	Bernadette Wilson (R)	Jonathan Kreiss-Tomkins (D)	Dave Bronson (R)	Treg Taylor (R)	Other	Undecided
AtlasIntel	October 28 – November 1, 2026	522 (LV)	± 4.0%	34%	52%	9%	4%	1%	—
New York Times/Siena University	October 23–30, 2026	610 (LV)	± 5.0%	25%	42%	7%	8%	—	17%
Alaska Survey Research (Note: First-choice results from a ranked-choice poll)	October 15–18, 2026	1,568 (LV)	± 3.0%	30%	50%	12%	8%	—	—
Data for Progress (D)	October 8–16, 2026	694 (LV)	± 4.0%	28%	46%	12%	9%	—	5%
Alaska Survey Research	October 1–3, 2026	1,512 (LV)	± 3.0%	27%	48%	15%	10%	—	—
New York Times/Siena University	September 24 – October 1, 2026	504 (LV)	± 5.1%	20%	40%	14%	7%	—	18%
Cygnal (R)	September 24–27, 2026	502 (LV)	± 4.37%	24%	44%	8%	9%	—	15%
co/efficient (R)	September 14–17, 2026	799 (LV)	± 3.5%	20%	43%	17%	6%	—	14%
Fabrizio Ward (R)/ Impact Research (D)	September 8–11, 2026	800 (LV)	± 3.5%	20%	40%	14%	7%	—	18%

Hypothetical polling

Poll source	Date(s) administered	Sample size	Margin of error	RCV round	Tom Begich (D)	Click Bishop (R)	Adam Crum (R)	Nancy Dahlstrom (R)	Edna DeVries (R)	Mary Peltola (D)	Treg Taylor (R)	Bernadette Wilson (R)
Data for Progress (D)	July 21–27, 2025	584 (LV)	± 4.0%	1	8%	8%	5%	13%	3%	47%	3%	13%
Data for Progress (D)	July 21–27, 2025	581 (LV)	± 4.0%	2	8%	9%	5%	14%	Elim	48%	4%	14%
Data for Progress (D)	July 21–27, 2025	575 (LV)	± 4.0%	3	8%	9%	5%	15%	Elim	48%	Elim	14%
Data for Progress (D)	July 21–27, 2025	567 (LV)	± 4.0%	4	9%	10%	Elim	17%	Elim	49%	Elim	15%
Data for Progress (D)	July 21–27, 2025	562 (LV)	± 4.0%	5	Elim	10%	Elim	19%	Elim	54%	Elim	16%
Data for Progress (D)	July 21–27, 2025	544 (LV)	± 4.0%	6	Elim	Elim	Elim	23%	Elim	58%	Elim	19%
Data for Progress (D)	July 21–27, 2025	491 (LV)	± 4.0%	7	Elim	Elim	Elim	35%	Elim	65%	Elim	Elim
Data for Progress (D)	July 21–27, 2025	498 (LV)	± 4.0%	7 (Note: Hypothetical scenario where voters whose fourth ranking is Click Bishop or Bernadette Wilson and whose vote is exhausted when those candidates are eliminated are instead distributed to Nancy Dahlstrom)	Elim	Elim	Elim	36%	Elim	64%	Elim	Elim
Data for Progress (D)	July 21–27, 2025	539 (LV)	± 4.0%	7 (Note: Hypothetical scenario above while also distributing the vote of all Republican respondents whose vote was exhausted after eliminating 'Not sure' to Nancy Dahlstrom)	Elim	Elim	Elim	41%	Elim	59%	Elim	Elim
Data for Progress (D)	July 21–27, 2025	539 (LV)	± 4.0%	7 (Note: Hypothetical scenario above while also distributing all votes exhausted when a Republican candidate is eliminated to Nancy Dahlstrom)	Elim	Elim	Elim	49%	Elim	51%	Elim	Elim
Data for Progress (D)	July 21–27, 2025	562 (LV)	± 4.0%	7 (Note: Hypothetical scenario above while also eliminating Mary Peltola in the first round)	44%	Elim	Elim	56%	Elim	Elim	Elim	Elim

Nick Begich vs. Mary Peltola

Poll source	Date(s) administered	Sample size	Margin of error	Nick Begich (R)	Mary Peltola (D)	Other	Undecided
Data for Progress (D)	February 28 – March 7, 2025	1000 (LV)	± 3.0%	46%	46%	5% (Note: "I would rank neither" with 5%)	3%

Nancy Dahlstrom vs. Mary Peltola

Poll source	Date(s) administered	Sample size	Margin of error	Nancy Dahlstrom (R)	Mary Peltola (D)	Other	Undecided
Data for Progress (D)	February 28 – March 7, 2025	1000 (LV)	± 3.0%	34%	44%	14% (Note: "I would rank neither" with 14%)	7%

Tom Begich vs. Click Bishop vs. Dave Bronson vs. Bernadette Wilson

Poll source	Date(s) administered	Sample size	Margin of error	Tom Begich (D)	Click Bishop (R)	Dave Bronson (R)	Bernadette Wilson (R)	Undecided
Alaska Survey Research	April 16–19, 2026	1,923 (LV)	± 2.5%	41%	19%	19%	22%	—
Alaska Survey Research	April 16–19, 2026	1,923 (LV)	± 2.5%	44%	25%	—	31%	—
Alaska Survey Research	April 16–19, 2026	1,923 (LV)	± 2.5%	54%	—	—	46%	—
Lake Research Partners (D)	February 5–11, 2026	600 (LV)	± 4.0%	38%	8%	13%	16%	25%

Poll source	Date(s) administered	Sample size	Margin of error	RCV round	Tom Begich (D)	Click Bishop (R)	Dave Bronson (R)	Jonathan Kreiss-Tomkins (D)	Bill Walker (I)	Bernadette Wilson (R)
Alaska Survey Research	June 30 – July 1, 2026	1,528 (LV)	± 2.7%	1	22%	13%	17%	16%	11%	22%
Alaska Survey Research	June 30 – July 1, 2026	1,528 (LV)	± 2.7%	2	25%	16%	18%	18%	Elim	23%
Alaska Survey Research	June 30 – July 1, 2026	1,528 (LV)	± 2.7%	3	29%	Elim	22%	21%	Elim	28%
Alaska Survey Research	June 30 – July 1, 2026	1,528 (LV)	± 2.7%	4	45%	Elim	24%	Elim	Elim	31%
Alaska Survey Research	June 30 – July 1, 2026	1,528 (LV)	± 2.7%	5	51%	Elim	Elim	Elim	Elim	49%

=== Debates and forums ===
2026 Alaska gubernatorial debates and forums (Note: Numerous debates and forums featuring various candidates were also held during the primary campaign.)
No.	Date	Host	Moderator	Link	Democratic	Republican	Democratic	Republican	Republican
Key: P Participant A Absent N Not invited I Invited W Withdrawn									
Key: P Participant A Absent N Not invited I Invited W Withdrawn					Begich	Bronson	Kreiss-Tomkins	Taylor	Wilson
1	Aug. 26, 2026	Alaska Oil and Gas Association	Kati Capozzi	Vimeo	P	P	P	N	P
2	Aug. 28, 2026	Alaska Municipal League			A	P	P	N	A
3	Sep. 9, 2026	Last Frontier Republican Club		Vimeo	W	P	P	P	A
4	Sep. 9, 2026	Kodiak Chamber of Commerce; KMXT (FM)	Gary Stevens	YouTube	W	P	P	P	P
5	Sep. 16, 2026	Alaska Hospital and Healthcare Association	Jared Kosin	Otter.ai (part one); Otter.ai (part two)	W	P	P	P	P
6	Sep. 17, 2026	Chugach Electric Association			W	P	P	P	P
7	Sep. 17, 2026	Commonwealth North	Moira Smith	YouTube	W	P	P	P	A
8	Sep. 18, 2026	Alaska Entrepreneurship Week	Pascual Reig		W	P	P	P (Note: Left before question rounds)	P
9	Sep. 19, 2026	Greater Wasilla Chamber of Commerce	Destiny O'Daniel	YouTube	W	P	P	P	P
10	Sep. 21, 2026	Resource Development Council (Note: With various cohosts)	Connor Hajdukovich	Vimeo	W	P	P	P	P
11	Sep. 21, 2026	Various	Lori Townsend	YouTube	W	P	P	P	P
12	Sep. 22, 2026	Anchorage Rotary Club		Otter.ai	W	P	P	P	P
13	Sep. 23, 2026	Confluence Summit	Heather Handyman	YouTube	W	P	P	A	A
14	Sep. 29, 2026	Southeast Conference			W	P	P	P	A
15	Oct. 1, 2026	Alaska Support Industry Alliance			W	P	P	P	P
16	Oct. 2, 2026	Alaska Power Association		Otter.ai	W	P	P	A	A
17	Oct. 7, 2026	Juneau Chamber of Commerce		Recording	W	P	P	A	P
18	Oct. 8, 2026	Alaska Public Media; KTOO; Alaska's News Source	Lori Townsend; Eric Stone; Wil Courtney	YouTube	W	P	P	P	P
19	Oct. 15, 2026	Alaska Landmine	Jeff Landfield	YouTube	W	P	A	P	A
20	Oct. 23, 2026	Alaska Federation of Natives	Antonia Gonzales		W	P	P	P	A

=== Results ===
2026 Alaska gubernatorial election
Party	Candidate	Votes	%	±%
Democratic	Jonathan Kreiss-Tomkins Zac Johnson	145,449	51.08	+26.86
Republican	Bernadette Wilson Mike Shower	79,336	27.86	N/A
Republican	Dave Bronson Josh Church	38,767	13.62	N/A
Republican	Treg Taylor Candice English	20,368	7.15	N/A
Write-in		825	0.29	−0.01
Total votes		284,745	100.00	
Turnout		290,323	47.95%	+3.55
Registered electors		605,433		
Democratic gain from Republican				

== Analysis ==
This was the first time since 1998 that a Democrat won a gubernatorial election in Alaska. While Alaska uses ranked choice voting, Kreiss-Tomkins reached the 50% threshold to prevent the tabulation of the ranked choice votes from being carried out. However, a FairVote analysis estimates Kreiss-Tomkins would have won by nearly 15% had RCV been carried out.

=== Exit poll ===
2026 Alaska gubernatorial election (CNN)
Demographic subgroup	Kreiss-Tomkins	Bronson	Taylor	Wilson	% of total vote
Ideology
Liberals	96	1	0	3	24
Moderates	68	9	7	16	35
Conservatives	8	25	12	55	41
Party
Democrats	98	1	0	0	17
Republicans	5	27	13	55	34
Independents	64	9	6	20	48
Donald Trump job approval
Approve	4	25	13	58	44
Disapprove	88	5	3	4	54
2024 presidential vote
Kamala Harris	98	1	1	0	39
Donald Trump	6	25	13	55	48
Another candidate	78	15	2	5	4
Did not vote	68	7	6	18	7
Gender
Men	45	16	8	31	51
Women	53	12	7	26	48
Income
$100,000 or more	51	14	7	29	50
$50,000-$99,999	51	14	6	29	31
Less than $50,000	48	15	12	25	19
White born-again or evangelical Christian?
Yes	15	17	12	56	20
No	59	13	6	22	80
Race by gender
White men	45	16	8	31	39
White women	55	12	7	26	35
All other voters	52	14	6	28	25
Age
18–29 years old	63	17	8	13	9
30–44 years old	64	11	5	20	21
45–64 years old	44	15	8	33	36
65 and older	45	14	8	34	33
Area type
Urban	55	16	3	25	21
Suburban	53	16	9	22	24
Rural	48	12	8	32	55
Education
College graduate	62	10	6	22	46
No college degree	41	17	8	34	54
Education by race
White college graduates	65	10	5	20	37
Non-white college graduates	50	11	9	30	9
Whites without college	36	18	10	37	38
Non-whites without college	52	15	5	28	15
Education by gender and race
White women with college degrees	72	7	5	16	18
White women without college degrees	38	17	10	35	17
White men with college degrees	58	13	6	23	19
White men without college degrees	33	19	9	39	21
Voters of color	52	13	6	28	25
Educational attainment
Advanced degree	65	10	6	20	21
Bachelor's degree	60	11	7	23	26
Associate's degree	46	16	5	32	10
Some college	38	20	11	32	25
Never attended college	41	14	7	38	19

== See also ==
- 2026 United States gubernatorial elections
- 2026 Alaska elections

== Notes ==
Partisan clients
