= Zac Johnson =

American politician (born 1981)

Lieutenant Governor-elect of Alaska
- Assuming office December 7, 2026
- Governor: Jonathan Kreiss-Tomkins (elect)
- Succeeding: Nancy Dahlstrom

Member of the Anchorage Assembly from the 6th district Seat K
- Incumbent
- Assumed office April 25, 2023
- Preceded by: Suzanne LaFrance

Personal details
- Born: 1981 (age 44–45) Anchorage, Alaska, U.S.
- Party: Independent
- Education: University of Alaska, Anchorage (BS)

Zachary Hackley Johnson (born 1981) is an American politician who is the lieutenant governor-elect of Alaska. An independent politician, Johnson succeeded Suzanne LaFrance as a member of the Anchorage Assembly from the 6th district, seat K since April 25, 2023. He was the running mate of Democrat Jonathan Kreiss-Tomkins in the 2026 Alaska gubernatorial election.

== Political career ==
In 2023, Johnson ran for the Anchorage Assembly in District 6, which represents the communities of South Anchorage, Turnagain Arm, and Girdwood. He won the seat over conservative pilot Rachel Reis and Libertarian candidate Mikal Insalaco, replacing retiring incumbent Suzanne LaFrance. He won reelection in April 2026 over volunteer Bruce Vergason and geoscientist Janelle Anausuk Sharp.

In July 2026, former state representative Jonathan Kreiss-Tomkins announced Johnson as his running mate in the 2026 Alaska gubernatorial election. They advanced to the general election after placing first in the nonpartisan primary among a field of 17, with 22.5% of the vote.

== Electoral history ==
=== 2023 ===
Anchorage Assembly District 6, Seat K General Election 2023
Candidate	Votes	%
Zac Johnson	7,929	50.52
Rachel Ries	7,110	45.30
Mikel Insalaco	602	3.84
Write-in	53	0.33
Total votes	15,641	100.00

=== 2026 ===
Anchorage Assembly District 6, Seat K General Election 2026
Candidate	Votes	%
Zac Johnson	7,479	47.52
Bruce Vergason	6,355	40.38
Janelle Anausuk Sharp	1,855	11.79
Write-in	53	0.33
Total votes	15,738	100.00

2026 Alaska gubernatorial election
Party	Candidate	Votes	%
Democratic	Jonathan Kreiss-Tomkins Zac Johnson	37,006	22.5
Democratic	Tom Begich (withdrew) Julia Hnilicka (withdrew)	34,172	20.8
Republican	Bernadette Wilson Mike Shower	16,468	10.0
Republican	Dave Bronson Josh Church	13,364	8.1
Republican	Treg Taylor Candice English	11,928	7.3
Republican	Click Bishop (withdrew) Greta Schuerch (withdrew)	11,527	7.0
Republican	Adam Crum Robert Craig	8,922	5.4
Republican	Shelley Hughes Blake Gettys	8,776	5.4
Independent	Bill Walker Randy Hoffbeck	7,341	4.5
Republican	Matt Heilala Jesse Sumner (withdrew)	4,330	2.6
Independent	Meda DeWitt Christopher Steere	4,184	2.5
Republican	Edna DeVries George Hightower	2,167	1.3
Republican	Lesil McGuire Elizabeth Rexford	2,098	1.3
Republican	Michael Loren Gilbert Timothy Hickel	675	0.4
Republican	James W. "JP4" Parkin Ramadhani "Ram" Greer	638	0.4
Independent	Destry J. Payne Sr. Cliff Silvers	372	0.2
Republican	Henry R. "Hank" Kroll Tommy R. Nicholson III	335	0.2
Total votes		164,303	100.0

2026 Alaska gubernatorial election
Party	Candidate	First choice		
Party	Candidate	Votes	%	Transfer
Republican	Dave Bronson; Josh Church			
Republican	Treg Taylor; Candice English			
Republican	Bernadette Wilson; Mike Shower			
Democratic	Jonathan Kreiss-Tomkins; Zac Johnson			
Write-in				
Total votes				
Inactive ballots				

Political offices
Preceded by Nancy Dahlstrom	Lieutenant Governor of Alaska; Taking office 2026	Elect
