= Alaska Senate district E =

Alaskan legislative district

Alaska's E State Senate district
Senator
Cathy Giessel; R–Anchorage
since 2023
- Population: 36,807

Alaska Senate district E is one of 20 districts of the Alaska Senate. It has been represented by Republican Cathy Giessel since 2023. Giessel previously represented District P from 2011 to 2013 and District N from 2013 to 2021. District E is located in southern Anchorage and encompasses the entirety of Alaska's 9th House of Representatives district and 10th House of Representatives district, including part of Anchorage, Turnagain Arm, and Whittier.

From 2013 to 2022, the district covered portions of Southeast Fairbanks Census Area, Matanuska-Susitna Borough, Copper River Census Area, and Chugach Census Area – this area is now encompassed by district O and district R.

== Election results (2022 boundaries) ==
=== 2022 ===
Nonpartisan primary
Party	Candidate	Votes	%
Republican	Cathy Giessel	4,441	35.6
Democratic	Roselynn Cacy	4,195	33.7
Republican	Roger Holland (incumbent)	3,823	30.7
Total votes		12,459	100.00

General election
Party	Candidate	First choice			Round 1			Round 2	
Party	Candidate	Votes	%	Transfer	Votes	%	Transfer	Votes	%
Republican	Cathy Giessel	5,611	33.64	+41	5,652	33.84	+2,229	7,881	55.98
Republican	Roger Holland (incumbent)	5,521	33.10	+11	5,532	33.12	+417	5,949	43.02
Democratic	Roselynn Cacy	5,490	32.91	+28	5,518	33.04	-5,518	Eliminated	
Write-in		58	0.35	-58	Eliminated				
Total votes		16,680			16,702			13,830	
Blank or inactive ballots					735		+2,872	3,607	
Republican hold									

== Election results (2013 boundaries) ==
Map of District E of the Alaska Senate from 2013 to 2022

=== 2018 ===
Republican primary
Party	Candidate	Votes	%
Republican	Mike Shower (incumbent)	3,776	68.09
Republican	Randall Kowalke	1,770	31.91
Total votes		5,546	100

Democratic primary
Party	Candidate	Votes	%
Democratic	Susan Kay	1,041	100.0
Total votes		1,041	100

General election
Party	Candidate	Votes	%
Republican	Mike Shower (incumbent)	11,558	74.10
Democratic	Susan Kay	3,992	25.59
Write-ins	Write-ins	48	0.31
Total votes		15,598	100
Republican hold			

=== 2014 ===
Republican primary
Party	Candidate	Votes	%
Republican	Mike Dunleavy (incumbent)	5,622	100.0
Total votes		5,622	100

General election
Party	Candidate	Votes	%
Republican	Mike Dunleavy (incumbent)	9,058	64.65
Independent	Warren Keogh	4,888	34.89
Write-ins	Write-ins	65	0.46
Total votes		14,011	100

== Election results (2012 boundaries) ==
Map of District E of the Alaska Senate from 2012 to 2013

=== 2012 ===
Republican primary
Party	Candidate	Votes	%
Republican	Charlie Huggins (incumbent)	3,322	100.0
Total votes		3,322	100.0

Democratic primary
Party	Candidate	Votes	%
Democratic	Susan Herman	681	100.0
Total votes		681	100

General election
Party	Candidate	Votes	%
Republican	Charlie Huggins (incumbent)	9,828	77.65
Democratic	Susan Herman	2,790	22.04
Write-ins	Write-ins	39	0.31
Total votes		12,657	100
Republican hold			
