= Carl Gatto =

American politician (1937–2012)

Carl J. Gatto

Member of the Alaska House of Representatives from the 13th district
- In office January 21, 2003 – April 10, 2012
- Preceded by: Scott Ogan
- Succeeded by: Shelley Hughes

Personal details
- Born: December 29, 1937 New York City, New York, U.S.
- Died: April 10, 2012 (aged 74) Seattle, Washington, U.S.
- Party: Republican
- Education: Brooklyn Polytechnic (BS); California State University, San Jose (BA); Northern Arizona University (MS)
- Occupation: Paramedic/Fire Officer

Carl J. Gatto (December 29, 1937 – April 10, 2012) was a Republican member of the Alaska House of Representatives, representing the 13th District since 2002. Before public office Carl Gatto was a paramedic and fire officer for the Anchorage Fire Department.

== Early life ==
Carl J. Gatto was born on December 29, 1937, in New York City. He first attended Brooklyn Technical High School and later earned a Bachelor of Science degree in mechanical engineering from Brooklyn Polytechnic. Gatto went on to study at California State University in San Jose, where he received a Bachelor of Arts in physical science and biology, along with teaching certifications for high school and special education. He later obtained a Master of Science in biology from Northern Arizona University.

After relocating to Alaska in 1968, Gatto continued his education at the University of Alaska Anchorage, where he earned an Associate of Arts in paramedicine and completed Fire Instructor certifications at levels I, II, and III. His early professional background included work as a military jet engineer at General Electric, contributing to the development of military aircraft engines.

== Political career ==
Gatto was a politician of the Republican Party. He was first elected to the Alaska House of Representatives in 2002 and took office in 2003. He served as Chair of the Military & Veterans' Affairs Special Committee, and was a member of the Judiciary Committee, State Affairs Committee, Administrative Regulation Review Committee and the Legislative Council. He also served on the Military & Veterans' Affairs, Natural Resources and the Revenue Finance Subcommittees, for the 26th Legislature.

Gatto received several awards in recognition of his service, including the Defender of Democracy Award (2004), the Frontiersman's Most Trusted Elected Official (2006), and Ag Legislator of the Year (2007). Governor Sean Parnell credited him for his dedication to education, veterans' issues, and public safety.

In 2011, Gatto introduced a bill in the Alaska House of Representatives that aimed to restrict the collective bargaining rights of many public employees. The proposed legislation would have limited bargaining to wages only, removing the ability to negotiate over hours, benefits, and working conditions. Firefighters, police officers, and emergency medical technicians were exempted from the bill, as they are legally barred from striking under Alaska law. Gatto stated that the bill was modeled on similar legislation passed in Wisconsin earlier that year and said it was intended to help curb state spending.

== Later life ==
Gatto was married to Cathy and had four children: Kip, Antonia, Samantha and Gabriel. Gatto died on April 10, 2012, in Seattle, after suffering from prostate cancer and kidney failure.
