= Bill Thomas (Alaska politician) =

American politician

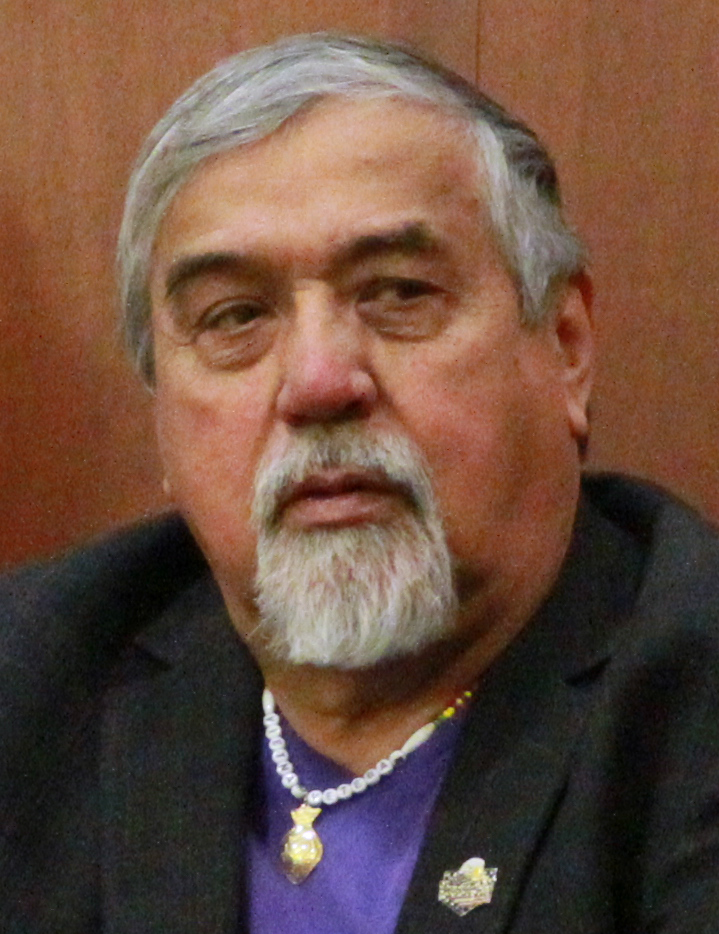
- Thomas in 2019

Member of the Alaska House of Representatives from the 5th district
- In office January 10, 2005 – January 14, 2013
- Preceded by: Albert Kookesh
- Succeeded by: Jonathan Kreiss-Tomkins (34th district); Pete B. Higgins (5th district)

Personal details
- Born: June 1, 1947 (age 79) Haines, Territory of Alaska
- Party: Republican
- Spouse: Joyce Marie Thomas
- Children: 5
- Education: University of Alaska
- Profession: Commercial fisherman

William A. Thomas Jr. (born June 1, 1947) is a businessman, commercial fisherman, and politician from the U.S. state of Alaska. From 2005 to 2013, he served as a Republican member of the Alaska House of Representatives from the 5th District, comprising scattered rural and semi-rural communities throughout Southeast Alaska and stretching westward to Prince William Sound. Thomas was in the majority for his entire tenure in the House and was the chairman of many committees. He gained a seat on the powerful House Finance Committee during his second term and eventually co-chaired the committee. After redistricting, he lost reelection in 2012 by 32 votes to 23-year-old Jonathan Kreiss-Tomkins, a political newcomer who left Yale University in New Haven, Connecticut to run.

== Early life ==
William A. Thomas Jr. was born in Haines, Territory of Alaska on June 1, 1947, and is a lifelong resident of Haines and the surrounding Chilkat Valley. He is descended from the Tlingit natives of nearby Klukwan, a village. Speaking before a Native organization in Juneau about his origins, Thomas once said "And the Thomas? That came from California".

Bill Thomas graduated from Haines High School in Haines in 1965. Soon afterwards, he briefly attended the University of Alaska in Fairbanks before joining the U.S. Army for two years. While in the Army, he served six months in Vietnam in 1968 during the Vietnam War.

== Business career ==
Bill Thomas began commercial fishing for a living ca. 1970, and continued in that occupation. He has mostly run gillnets and longlines. Thomas has been the chairman and CEO of his village's Native corporation, Klukwan, Inc. The position led to him serving on the board of directors in a number of the corporation's subsidiaries.

== Political career ==
=== Early political career ===
Thomas began working as a lobbyist in Juneau ca. 1991, mostly representing small community concerns throughout Southeast Alaska. He was on the Haines Borough assembly for four years and the school board for the same amount of time. In 2004, Democrat Georgianna Lincoln, who represented the sprawling, rural District C in the Alaska Senate (Lincoln hailed from the Yukon River village of Rampart), did not seek reelection. Albert Kookesh, a 5th District member of the Alaska House of Representatives filed to run for the Senate, eventually winning. Thomas ran for the 5th District House seat, citing his experience as a lobbyist as being beneficial to the position. He won election in 2004 by 59 votes over Tim June, a fellow commercial fisherman from Haines, who was active in environmental and watershed issues for quite some time. Thomas was reelected mostly easily thereafter, including defeating June by a margin of approximately 61 to 38 percent in 2008.

=== Alaska House of Representatives ===
==== 24th Alaska State Legislature ====
In the 24th Alaska State Legislature, Thomas served as co-chair of the House Community and Regional Affairs Committee, as well as co-chair of the Fisheries Committee. He was on the Education, Military and Veterans' Affairs and the Transportation Committees in the House.

2007-2008

- Member, Finance Committee

2005-2006

- Commerce, Community & Economic Development
- Fish & Game
- Transportation

2007-2008

- Chair, Administration
- Chair, Fish & Game

He served as co-chair of the Finance Committee and was a member of the Legislative Budget & Audit Committee. He chaired the Governor and the Legislature Finance Subcommittees for the 27th Legislature.

=== 2012 election loss ===
Due to an Alaskan Supreme Court order, the redistricting board redrew the district lines for the 2012 election based on state constitutional requirements. Major changes were proposed to the Southeast region, including Thomas' district. A proposed plan combined the 5th District with Juneau, the state capital directly to the south. Constituents from the Haines Borough objected to the new map and Mayor Stephanie Scott said, "we do not believe that we are socio-economically integrated with the Mendenhall Valley, we don't have the same concerns, the same needs." Jonathan Kreiss-Tomkins of Sitka was the Democratic challenger to Thomas.

After a recount, Kreiss-Tomkins subsequently won by 32 votes against Thomas. As ballot-counting continued beyond election day, the lead went back and forth and even tied at one point.
