= 2016 Alaska Senate election =

- November 8, 2016

10 of 20 seats in the Alaska Senate 11 seats needed for a majority
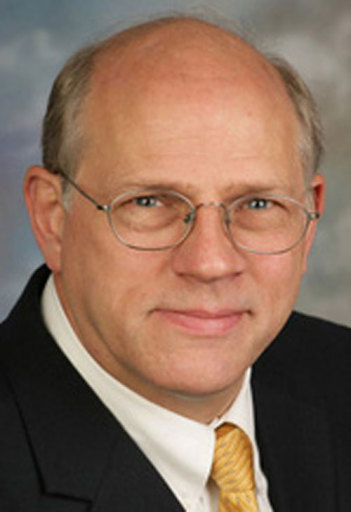

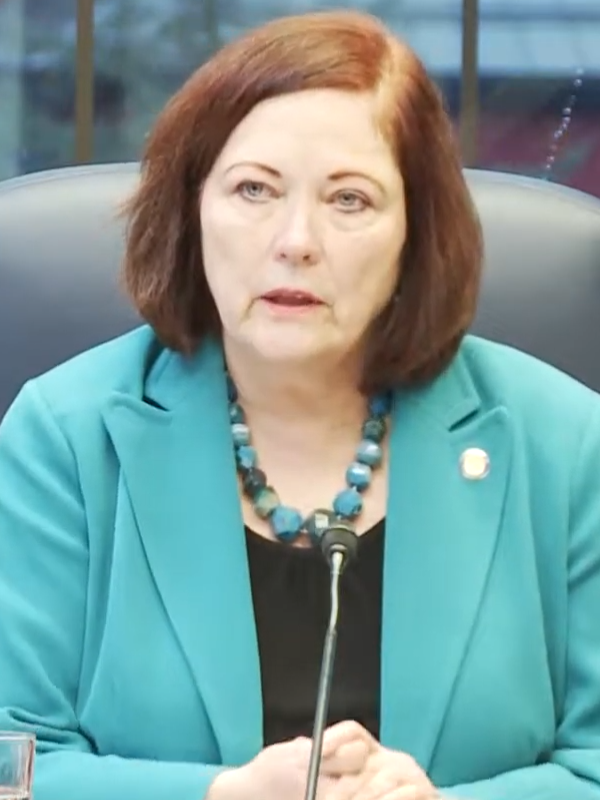
	Majority party	Minority party
Leader	John Coghill	Berta Gardner
Party	Republican	Democratic
Leader since	January 15, 2013	January 17, 2015
Leader's seat	District O	District I
Seats before	14	6
Seats after	14	6
Seat change	Steady	Steady
Popular vote	80,123	36,138
Percentage	59.96%	27.05%
- Results: Democratic hold Republican hold No election
President pro tempore before election
Peter Micciche
Republican
President pro tempore-designate
Peter Micciche
Republican

The 2016 Alaska Senate election were held on Tuesday, November 8, 2016, with the primary election on August 16, 2016. Voters in the 10 districts of the Alaska Senate elected their representatives. The elections coincided with the elections for other offices, including for U.S. President and the state assembly.

In Alaska, congressional and state-level elections use a top-four primary system. This means all candidates compete in one primary election, and the four who receive the most votes — no matter their political party — move on to the general election.

== Overview ==
2016 Alaska Senate election General election — November 8, 2016
Party	Votes	Percentage	Not up	Contested	Before	After	+/–
Republican	80,123	59.96%	7	7	14	14	Steady
Democratic	36,138	27.05%	3	3	6	6	Steady
Independent	14,610	10.93%	0	3	0	0	Steady
Write-ins	2,749	2.05%	0	10	0	0	Steady

== Predictions ==
Source	Ranking	As of
Governing	Likely R	October 12, 2016

== Results ==
=== District B ===
2016 Alaska Senate district B election
Party	Candidate	Votes	%
Republican	John Coghill (incumbent)	8,429	52.96%
Democratic	Luke Hopkins	7,336	46.09%
Write-ins	Write-ins	151	0.95%
Total votes		15,916	100%

=== District D ===
2016 Alaska Senate district D election
Party	Candidate	Votes	%
Republican	David S. Wilson	11,689	96.44%
Write-ins	Write-ins	431	3.56%
Total votes		12,120	100%

=== District F ===
2016 Alaska Senate district F election
Party	Candidate	Votes	%
Republican	Shelley Hughes	12,284	71.73%
Independent	Tim Hale	4,750	27.74%
Write-ins	Write-ins	92	0.54%
Total votes		17,126	100%

=== District H ===
2016 Alaska Senate district H election
Party	Candidate	Votes	%
Democratic	Bill Wielechowski (incumbent)	6,125	56.56%
Republican	Kevin D. Kastner	4,674	43.16%
Write-ins	Write-ins	30	0.28%
Total votes		10,829	100%

=== District J ===
2016 Alaska Senate district J election
Party	Candidate	Votes	%
Democratic	Tom Begich (incumbent)	8,103	93.49%
Write-ins	Write-ins	564	6.51%
Total votes		8,667	100%

=== District L ===
2016 Alaska Senate district L election
Party	Candidate	Votes	%
Republican	Natasha von Imhof	7,645	51.81%
Democratic	Forrest J. McDonald	5,971	40.46%
Independent	Tom Johnson	1,088	7.37%
Write-ins	Write-ins	53	0.36%
Total votes		14,757	100%

=== District N ===
2016 Alaska Senate district N election
Party	Candidate	Votes	%
Republican	Cathy Giessel (incumbent)	9,570	51.90%
Independent	Vince Beltrami	8,772	47.57%
Write-ins	Write-ins	98	0.53%
Total votes		18,440	100%

=== District P ===
2016 Alaska Senate district P election
Party	Candidate	Votes	%
Republican	Gary Stevens (incumbent)	12,950	96.40%
Write-ins	Write-ins	484	3.60%
Total votes		13,434	100%

=== District R ===
2016 Alaska Senate district R election
Party	Candidate	Votes	%
Republican	Bert Stedman (incumbent)	12,882	95.73%
Write-ins	Write-ins	574	4.27%
Total votes		13,456	100%

=== District T ===
2016 Alaska Senate district T election
Party	Candidate	Votes	%
Democratic	Donny Olson (incumbent)	8,603	96.94%
Write-ins	Write-ins	272	3.06%
Total votes		8,875	100%
