= KMXT =

KMXT may refer to:

- KMXT (FM), a radio station (100.1 FM) licensed to serve Kodiak, Alaska, United States
- KMXT-LP, a defunct low-power television station (channel 9) formerly licensed to serve Kodiak
