= Scott Ogan =

American politician and businessman

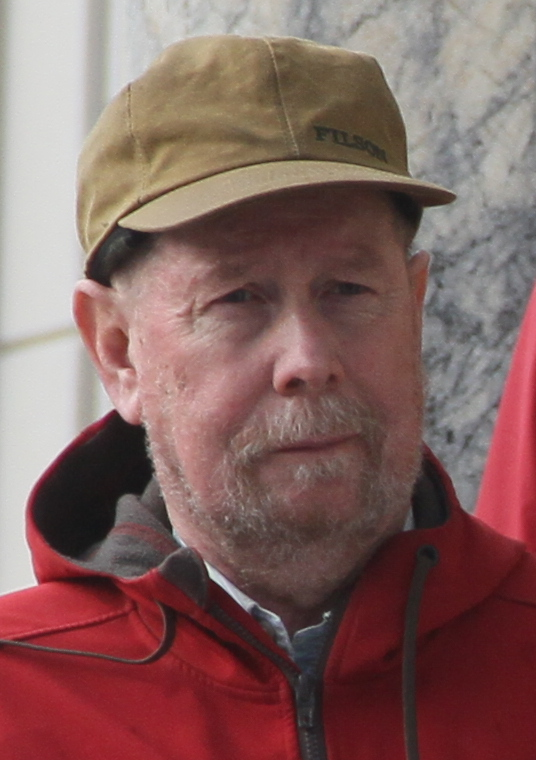

Scott Ogan (born May 3, 1952) is an American Republican politician and businessman.

== Life and career ==
Born in Columbus, Ohio, Ogan graduated from Seacrest High School, Delray Beach, Florida in 1970. In 1975, Ogan moved to Anchorage, Alaska and settled in Palmer, Alaska in 1982. He was the owner of Mountain Woodcrafters, an architectural millwork business.

== Politics ==
From 1995 to 2001, Ogan served in the Alaska House of Representatives and was a Republican. He then served in the Alaska State Senate from 2001 until 2004. He was hired as a consultant at $40,000 per year for Evergreen Resources, Inc, of Denver, Colorado. This was perceived by voters to be a conflict of interest while in the Alaska Legislature and recall efforts were launched. One day before recall, he resigned in August 2004.

== Personal life ==
He is married and has two children.
