= Jonathan Kreiss-Tomkins =

Governor-elect of Alaska (born 1989)

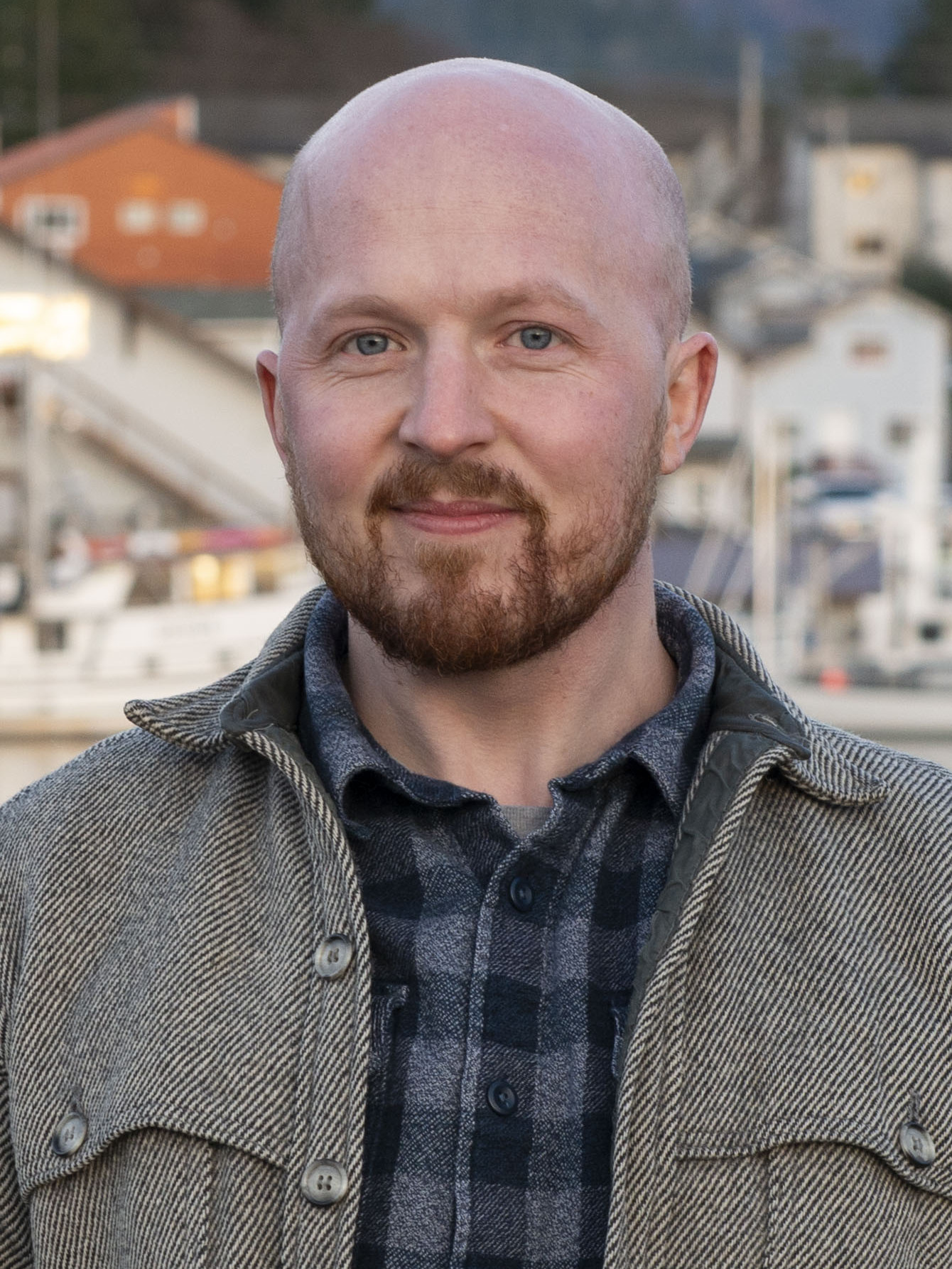
- Kreiss-Tomkins in 2026

Governor-elect of Alaska
- Assuming office December 7, 2026
- Lieutenant: Zac Johnson (elect)
- Succeeding: Mike Dunleavy

Member of the Alaska House of Representatives from the 35th district
- In office January 15, 2013 – January 17, 2023
- Preceded by: Bill Thomas (redistricted)
- Succeeded by: Rebecca Himschoot (redistricted)

Personal details
- Born: Jonathan Septer Kreiss-Tomkins; February 7, 1989 (age 37) Sitka, Alaska, U.S.
- Party: Democratic
- Education: Yale University (attended)
- Website: Campaign website

Jonathan Septer Kreiss-Tomkins (born February 7, 1989), also known by his initials as JKT, is an American politician who is the governor-elect of Alaska. A member of the Democratic Party, he served as a member of the Alaska House of Representatives from the 35th district from 2013 to 2023.

Born and raised in Sitka, Kreiss-Tomkins attended Yale University until his election to the Alaska House of Representatives in 2012. His district encompassed many Southeast island communities, including Hoonah, Sitka, Kake, Klawock, Craig, Angoon and Petersburg. He was elected governor of Alaska in 2026, defeating three Republican opponents. Upon taking office, he will become the state's first Democratic governor since Tony Knowles in 1998, the youngest governor in Alaska history, the first governor born in Alaska after statehood, and the youngest serving governor in the United States.

== Early life and education ==
Kreiss-Tomkins in September 2006

Kreiss-Tomkins was born on February 7, 1989, in Sitka, Alaska. His mother, Connie Kreiss, worked as a family doctor. He graduated from Sitka High School as an Eagle Scout. He attended Yale University but dropped out to run for the Alaska House of Representatives in 2012.

== Alaska House of Representatives ==
=== 2012 election ===
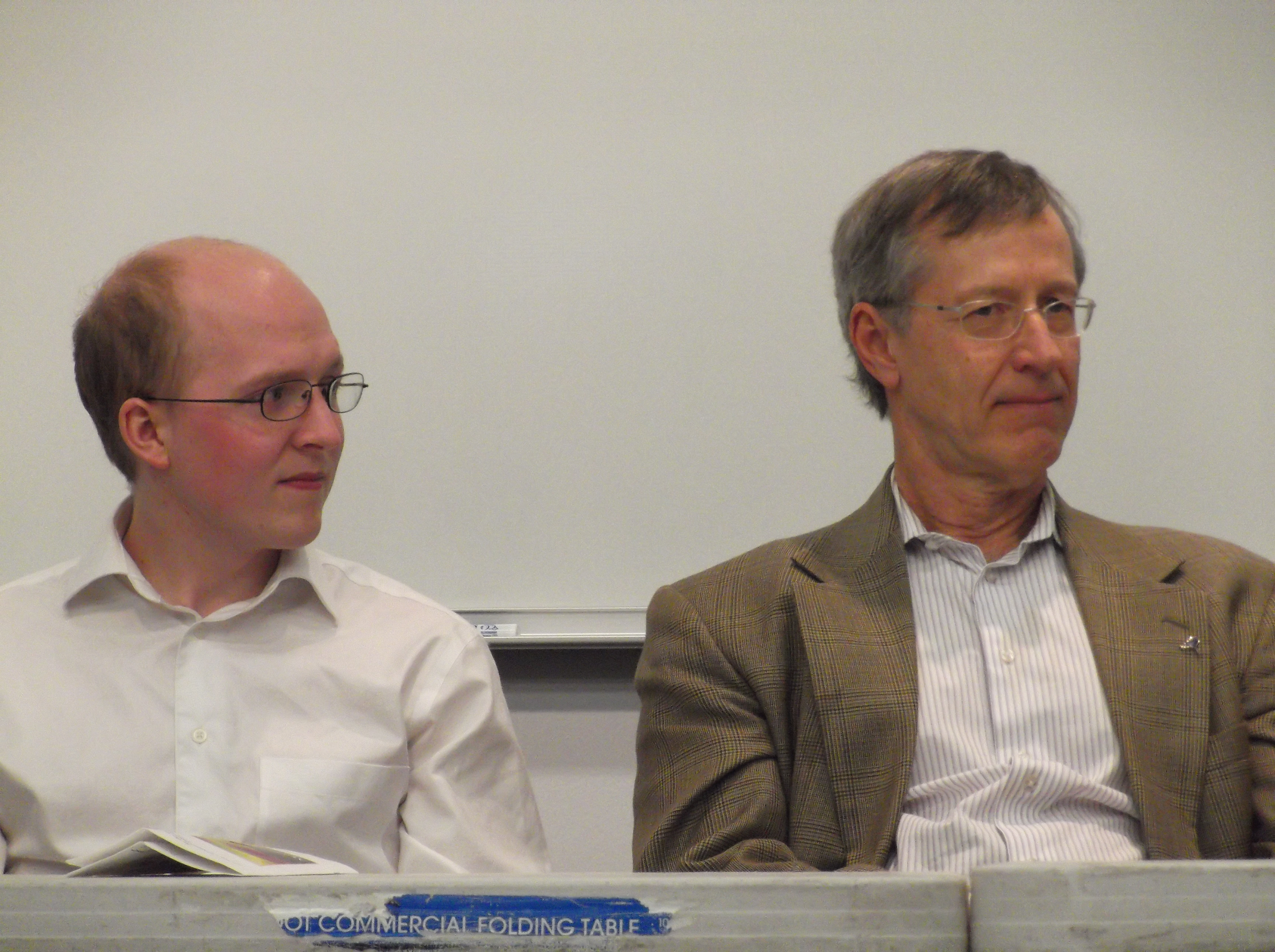
Kreiss-Tomkins and Terry Gardiner during a panel discussion at the University of Alaska Fairbanks in March 2013

Due to the 2010 census redistricting, Bill Thomas, a state representative since 2004, was redrawn into a slightly altered district. Kreiss-Tomkins's hometown of Sitka fell into the 34th district, and no other Democratic candidates filed to run in the primary, so he decided to run for the seat. He dropped out of Yale University after three years to do so.

The race was very close, and Kreiss-Tomkins won with 50.12% of the vote. After a recount that decreased his margin of victory from 34 votes to 32, the race was called on December 3, 2012.

=== 2014 election ===
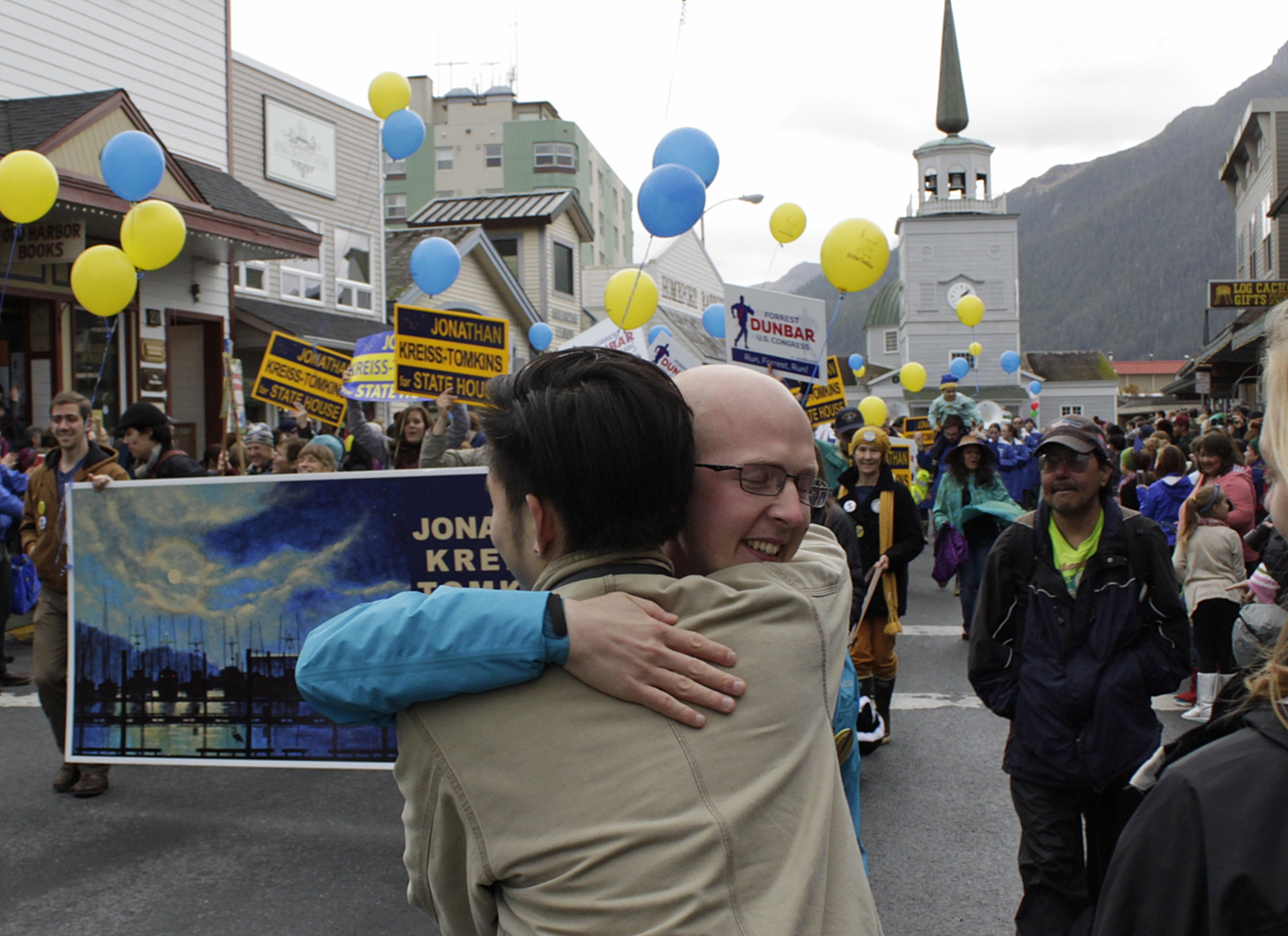
Kreiss-Tomkins, campaigning for reelection in October 2014 during the Alaska Day Parade

In the 2014 midterm elections, Kreiss-Tomkins was reelected with 60% of the vote (3,393 votes to 2,288). His opponent was Petersburg Republican, Steven Samuelson, who had lost twice before to Peggy Wilson of Wrangell during the primaries. Kreiss-Tomkins was elected in a slightly altered district (renumbered as Alaska House of Representatives District 35) that now included Petersburg and the northern end of Prince of Wales Island, but no longer covered Haines or Metlakatla.

=== Committees ===
For the 30th legislature, Kreiss-Tomkins was a member of the following committees:

- House State Affairs (chair)
- House Community & Regional Affairs
- House Fisheries
- House Judiciary

=== Legislation ===
Kreiss-Tomkins introduced House Bill 216, which recognized 20 Alaskan Native languages as official state languages alongside English. The bill was passed into law in April 2014.

== Governor ==
==== 2026 Alaska gubernatorial campaign ====
On February 4, 2026, Kreiss-Tomkins announced his candidacy for governor of Alaska in 2026.

Kreiss-Tomkins spent the most money of any candidate during the primary campaign and reported the largest number of individual Alaskan contributors, but raised most of his money from donors outside Alaska, including employees of Anthropic and others tied to the artificial intelligence industry.

Kreiss-Tomkins placed first in the nonpartisan primary with 22.5% of the vote, ahead of fellow Democrat Tom Begich with 20.8%. Begich subsequently withdrew from the election and endorsed Kreiss-Tomkins.

Kreiss-Tomkins won the November 3 general election with 50.8% of the first-choice votes, becoming Alaska's first Democratic gubernatorial nominee to win an election since Tony Knowles in 1998, its youngest governor ever elected, and its third governor born in the state. He said he planned to form an administration of Democrats, Republicans and independents, and he is set to be sworn in as governor on December 7, 2026.

== Personal life ==
As a freshman at Sitka High School in 2003, Kreiss-Tomkins attracted national attention as a major online organizer for Howard Dean's presidential campaign. Kreiss-Tomkins, under the account Jonathan.s.kt, made over 13,000 edits to Wikipedia from 2005 to 2011.

Kreiss-Tomkins is a long-distance runner, winning the Alpine Adventure Race in 2009 and placing second in the Coyote Two Moon ultramarathon in 2010. While attending Yale, Kreiss-Tomkins was organizer for Harriers of the Night, a running club whose members met weekly at midnight to run from the Yale Women's Table to East Rock and back.

Kreiss-Tomkins is also a mountaineer, and, in 2009, climbed the highest volcano in the world, which is the Argentine and Chilean Ojos del Salado, to conclusively measure its height against a neighbouring peak on the Chilean side.

Kreiss-Tomkins founded Outer Coast College and the Alaska Fellows Program. In 2020, he co-founded Covid Act Now.

Party political offices
| Preceded by Les Gara | Democratic nominee for Governor of Alaska; 2026 | Most recent |
Political offices
| Preceded by Mike Dunleavy | Governor of Alaska; Taking office 2026 | Elect |
