= Alaska Senate district M =

Alaskan legislative district

Alaska's M State Senate district
Senator
Cathy Tilton; R–Wasilla
since 2025
- Population: 37,629

Alaska Senate district M is one of 20 districts of the Alaska Senate. It has been represented by Republican Cathy Tilton since 2025. Tilton was appointed to the seat after Shelley Hughes resigned to focus on her campaign for governor in the 2026 election. District M is located in the Mat-Su Valley and encompasses the entirety of Alaska's 25th and 26th House of Representatives districts, including Palmer, Butte, and Gateway.

== Election results (2022 boundaries) ==
=== 2022 ===
Nonpartisan primary
Party	Candidate	Votes	%
Republican	Shelley Hughes (incumbent)	7,707	75.7
Democratic	Jim Cooper	2,479	24.3
Total votes		10,186	100.00

General election
Party	Candidate	Votes	%
Republican	Shelley Hughes (incumbent)	11,257	75.8
Democratic	Jim Cooper	3,561	24.0
Write-in	Write-ins	32	0.2
Total votes		14,850	100.0
Republican hold			

== Election results (2013 boundaries) ==
Map of District M of the Alaska Senate from 2013 to 2022

=== 2020 (special) ===
After the death of Sen. Chris Birch in August 2019, Governor Mike Dunleavy appointed state representative Josh Revak to the Senate the following month.

Republican primary
Party	Candidate	Votes	%
Republican	Josh Revak (incumbent)	2,499	66.2
Republican	Ray Metcalfe	911	24.2
Republican	Harold Borbridge	362	9.6
Total votes		3,772	100.0

Democratic primary
Party	Candidate	Votes	%
Democratic	Anita Thorne	2,732	87.5
Democratic	Nicholas Willie	389	12.5
Total votes		3,121	100.0

Thorne withdrew from the election without naming a replacement.

Special election
Party	Candidate	Votes	%
Republican	Josh Revak (incumbent)	10,390	57.6
Independent	Andy Holleman	7,596	42.1
Write-in	Write-ins	55	0.3
Total votes		18,041	100.0
Republican hold			

=== 2018 ===
Republican primary
Party	Candidate	Votes	%
Republican	Chris Birch	3,144	77.90
Republican	Bekah Halat	892	22.10
Total votes		4,036	100

Democratic primary
Party	Candidate	Votes	%
Democratic	Janice Park	1,738	100.0
Total votes		1,738	100

General election
Party	Candidate	Votes	%
Republican	Chris Birch	8,665	58.48
Democratic	Janice Park	6,110	41.23
Write-ins	Write-ins	43	0.29
Total votes		14,818	100
Republican hold			

=== 2014 ===
Republican primary
Party	Candidate	Votes	%
Republican	Kevin Meyer (incumbent)	5,654	100.0
Total votes		5,654	100

Democratic primary
Party	Candidate	Votes	%
Democratic	Felix E. Rivera	2,701	100.0
Total votes		2,701	100

General election
Party	Candidate	Votes	%
Republican	Kevin Meyer (incumbent)	9,909	69.71
Democratic	Felix E. Rivera	4,239	29.82
Write-ins	Write-ins	66	0.46
Total votes		14,214	100
Republican hold			

== Election results (2012 boundaries) ==
Map of District M of the Alaska Senate from 2012 to 2013

=== 2012 ===
Republican primary
Party	Candidate	Votes	%
Republican	Anna Fairclough	5,008	100.0
Total votes		5,008	100

Democratic primary
Party	Candidate	Votes	%
Democratic	Bettye Davis (incumbent)	1,442	52.49
Democratic	Harry Crawford	1,305	47.51
Total votes		2,747	100

General election
Party	Candidate	Votes	%
Republican	Anna Fairclough	11,012	62.12
Democratic	Bettye Davis (incumbent)	6,676	37.66
Write-ins	Write-ins	38	0.21
Total votes		17,726	100
Republican gain from Democratic			
