= Alaska Senate district O =

Alaskan legislative district

Alaska's O State Senate district
Senator
George Rauscher; R–Wasilla
since 2025
- Population: 37,516

Alaska Senate district O is one of 20 districts of the Alaska Senate. It has been represented by Republican George Rauscher since November of 2025 after filling the vacancy left by Mike Shower, who resigned to run for lieutenant governor in the 2026 gubernatorial election. District O is located in the Mat-Su Valley and encompasses the entirety of Alaska's 29th House of Representatives district and 30th House of Representatives district, including Valdez, Houston, and Big Lake.

From 2013 to 2022, the district covered a portion of Alaska south of Anchorage - this area is now encompassed by district D.

== Election results (2022 boundaries) ==
=== 2022 ===
Nonpartisan primary
Party	Candidate	Votes	%
Republican	Doug Massie	5,007	53.9
Republican	Mike Shower (incumbent)	4,288	46.1
Total votes		9,295	100.00

General election
Party	Candidate	Votes	%
Republican	Mike Shower (incumbent)	7,396	51.8
Republican	Doug Massie	6,712	47.0
Write-in	Write-ins	169	1.2
Total votes		14,277	100.0
Republican hold			

== Election results (2013 boundaries) ==
Map of District O of the Alaska Senate from 2013 to 2022

=== 2018 ===
Republican primary
Party	Candidate	Votes	%
Republican	Peter Micciche (incumbent)	2,944	50.62
Republican	Ronald Gillham	2,872	49.38
Total votes		5,816	100

General election
Party	Candidate	Votes	%
Republican	Peter Micciche (incumbent)	9,617	66.82
Write-ins	Write-ins	4,776	33.18
Total votes		14,393	100
Republican hold			

=== 2014 ===
Republican primary
Party	Candidate	Votes	%
Republican	Peter Micciche (incumbent)	6,688	100.0
Total votes		6,688	100

General election
Party	Candidate	Votes	%
Republican	Peter Micciche (incumbent)	11,306	76.22
Independent	Eric D. Treider	3,441	23.20
Write-ins	Write-ins	86	0.58
Total votes		14,833	100
Republican hold			

== Election results (2012 boundaries) ==
Map of District O of the Alaska Senate from 2012 to 2013

=== 2012 ===
Republican primary
Party	Candidate	Votes	%
Republican	Peter Micciche	3,963	58.62
Republican	Thomas Wagoner (incumbent)	2,797	41.38
Total votes		6,760	100

General election
Party	Candidate	Votes	%
Republican	Peter Micciche	12,947	94.61
Write-ins	Write-ins	738	5.39
Total votes		13,685	100
Republican hold			
