= Alaska Senate district K =

Alaskan legislative district

Alaska's K State Senate district
Senator
Bill Wielechowski; D–Anchorage
since 2023
- Population: 36,699

Alaska Senate district K is one of 20 districts of the Alaska Senate. It has been represented by Democrat Bill Wielechowski since 2023. Wielechowski previously represented District J from 2007–2013 and District H from 2013–2023. District K is located in Anchorage and encompasses the entirety of Alaska's 21st House of Representatives district and 22nd House of Representatives district, including Muldoon.

== Election results (2022 boundaries) ==
=== 2022 ===
Nonpartisan primary
Party	Candidate	Votes	%
Democratic	Bill Wielechowski (incumbent)	4,131	56.6
Republican	John Cunningham	3,171	43.4
Total votes		7,302	100.00

General election
Party	Candidate	Votes	%
Democratic	Bill Wielechowski (incumbent)	6,267	58.0
Republican	John Cunningham	4,504	41.7
Write-in	Write-ins	35	0.3
Total votes		10,806	100.0
Democratic hold			

== Election results (2013 boundaries) ==
Map of District K of the Alaska Senate from 2013 to 2022

=== 2018 ===
Republican primary
Party	Candidate	Votes	%
Republican	Mia Costello (incumbent)	3,076	100.0
Total votes		3,076	100

Democratic primary
Party	Candidate	Votes	%
Democratic	Sam Cason	2,127	100.0
Total votes		2,127	100

General election
Party	Candidate	Votes	%
Republican	Mia Costello (incumbent)	8,389	57.01
Democratic	Sam Cason	6,281	42.69
Write-ins	Write-ins	44	0.30
Total votes		14,714	100
Republican hold			

=== 2014 ===
Republican primary
Party	Candidate	Votes	%
Republican	Mia Costello	5,602	100.0
Total votes		5,602	100

Democratic primary
Party	Candidate	Votes	%
Democratic	Clare Ross	3,629	100.0
Total votes		3,629	100

General election
Party	Candidate	Votes	%
Republican	Mia Costello	8,529	56.50
Democratic	Clare Ross	6,531	43.26
Write-ins	Write-ins	36	0.24
Total votes		15,096	100
Republican gain from Democratic			

== Election results (2012 boundaries) ==
Map of District K of the Alaska Senate from 2012 to 2013

=== 2012 ===
Republican primary
Party	Candidate	Votes	%
Republican	Lesil McGuire (incumbent)	2,203	56.04
Republican	Jeff Landfield	1,728	43.96
Total votes		3,931	100

Democratic primary
Party	Candidate	Votes	%
Democratic	Roselynn Cacy	1,502	100.0
Total votes		1,502	100

General election
Party	Candidate	Votes	%
Republican	Lesil McGuire (incumbent)	9,291	66.02
Democratic	Roselynn Cacy	4,694	33.35
Write-ins	Write-ins	88	0.63
Total votes		14,073	100
Republican hold			
