= Alaska Senate district J =

Alaskan legislative district

Alaska's J State Senate district
Senator
Forrest Dunbar; D–Anchorage
since 2023
- Population: 36,482

Alaska Senate district J is one of 20 districts of the Alaska Senate. It has been represented by Democrat Forrest Dunbar since 2023. District J is located in Anchorage and encompasses the entirety of Alaska's 19th House of Representatives district and 20th House of Representatives district, including Mountain View and the University of Alaska Anchorage.

== Election results (2022 boundaries) ==
=== 2024 ===
Nonpartisan primary
Party	Candidate	Votes	%
Democratic	Forrest Dunbar (incumbent)	2,253	72.3
Independent	Cheronda Smith (Note: Listed on the ballot as "Undeclared")	863	27.7
Total votes		3,116	100.0

General election
Party	Candidate	Votes	%
Democratic	Forrest Dunbar (incumbent)	7,292	69.83
Independent	Cheronda Smith	3,022	28.94
Write-in		129	1.24
Total votes		10,443	100.0
Democratic hold			
Coalition hold			

=== 2022 ===
Nonpartisan primary
Party	Candidate	Votes	%
Democratic	Forrest Dunbar	2,947	49.4
Republican	Andrew Satterfield	1,904	31.9
Democratic	Geran Tarr	916	15.3
Democratic	Drew Cason (withdrew)	201	3.4
Total votes		5,968	100.00

General election
Party	Candidate	Votes	%
Democratic	Forrest Dunbar	4,306	50.0
Republican	Andrew Satterfield	2,813	32.7
Democratic	Geran Tarr	1,443	16.8
Write in	Write-ins	45	0.5
Total votes		8,607	100.00
Democratic gain from Republican			

== Election results (2013 boundaries) ==
Map of District J of the Alaska Senate from 2013 to 2022

=== 2020 ===
Democratic primary
Party	Candidate	Votes	%
Democratic	Tom Begich (incumbent)	1,739	50.2
Total votes		1,739	100.0

General election
Party	Candidate	Votes	%
Democratic	Tom Begich (incumbent)	9,235	92.6
Write-in	Write-ins	734	7.4
Total votes		9,969	100.0
Democratic hold			

=== 2016 ===
Democratic primary
Party	Candidate	Votes	%
Democratic	Tom Begich (incumbent)	1,629	62.46
Democratic	Ed Wesley	979	37.54
Total votes		2,608	100

General election
Party	Candidate	Votes	%
Democratic	Tom Begich (incumbent)	8,103	93.49
Write-ins	Write-ins	564	6.51
Total votes		8,667	100
Democratic hold			

== Election results (2012 boundaries) ==
Map of District J of the Alaska Senate from 2012 to 2013

=== 2012 ===
Republican primary
Party	Candidate	Votes	%
Republican	Bob Bell	2,622	60.53
Republican	Liz Vazquez	1,710	39.47
Total votes		4,332	100

Democratic primary
Party	Candidate	Votes	%
Democratic	Hollis French (incumbent)	2,284	100.0
Total votes		2,284	100

General election
Party	Candidate	Votes	%
Democratic	Hollis French (incumbent)	7,593	50.01
Republican	Bob Bell	7,542	49.68
Write-ins	Write-ins	47	0.31
Total votes		15,182	100
Democratic hold			
