= Alaska Senate district H =

Alaskan legislative district

Alaska's H State Senate district
Senator
Matt Claman; D–Anchorage
since 2023
- Population: 36,350

Alaska Senate district H is one of 20 districts of the Alaska Senate. It has been represented by Democrat Matt Claman since 2023. District H is located in Anchorage and encompasses the entirety of Alaska's 15th House of Representatives district and 16th House of Representatives district, including Sand Lake, Campbell Lake, and Anchorage Airport.

== Election results (2022 boundaries) ==
=== 2024 ===
Nonpartisan primary
Party	Candidate	Votes	%
Democratic	Matt Claman (incumbent)	4,036	60.1
Republican	Thomas McKay (withdrew)	1,393	20.7
Republican	Liz Vazquez	1,287	19.2
Total votes		6,716	100.0

General election
Party	Candidate	Votes	%
Democratic	Matt Claman (incumbent)	9,924	55.24
Republican	Liz Vazquez	7,989	44.47
Write-in		53	0.3
Total votes		17,966	100.0
Democratic hold			
Coalition hold			

=== 2022 ===
Nonpartisan primary
Party	Candidate	Votes	%
Democratic	Matt Claman	6,022	52.6
Republican	Mia Costello (incumbent)	5,424	47.4
Total votes		11,446	100.00

General election
Party	Candidate	Votes	%
Democratic	Matt Claman	7,868	51.8
Republican	Mia Costello (incumbent)	7,271	47.9
Write-in	Write-ins	51	0.3
Total votes		15,190	100.0
Democratic gain from Republican			

== Election results (2013 boundaries) ==
Map of District H of the Alaska Senate from 2013 to 2022

=== 2020 ===
Republican primary
Party	Candidate	Votes	%
Republican	Madeleine Gaiser	1,874	100.0
Total votes		1,874	100.0

Democratic primary
Party	Candidate	Votes	%
Democratic	Bill Wielechowski (incumbent)	2,218	100.0
Total votes		2,218	100.0

General election
Party	Candidate	Votes	%
Democratic	Bill Wielechowski (incumbent)	7,297	57.8
Republican	Madeline Gaiser	5,318	42.1
Write-in	Write-ins	19	0.1
Total votes		12,634	100.0
Democratic hold			

=== 2016 ===
Republican primary
Party	Candidate	Votes	%
Republican	Kevin Kastner	1,353	100.0
Total votes		1,353	100

Democratic primary
Party	Candidate	Votes	%
Democratic	Bill Wielechowski (incumbent)	1,137	100.0
Total votes		1,137	100

General election
Party	Candidate	Votes	%
Democratic	Bill Wielechowski (incumbent)	6,125	56.56
Republican	Kevin D. Kastner	4,674	43.16
Write-ins	Write-ins	30	0.28
Total votes		10,829	100
Democratic hold			

== Election results (2012 boundaries) ==
Map of District H of the Alaska Senate from 2012 to 2013

=== 2012 ===
Republican primary
Party	Candidate	Votes	%
Republican	Don Smith	1,348	60.42
Republican	Clint Hess	883	39.58
Total votes		2,231	100

Democratic primary
Party	Candidate	Votes	%
Democratic	Berta Gardner	2,348	100.0
Total votes		2,348	100

General election
Party	Candidate	Votes	%
Democratic	Berta Gardner	6,950	59.23
Republican	Don Smith	4,730	40.31
Write-ins	Write-ins	54	0.46
Total votes		11,734	100
Democratic hold			
