= Shelley Hughes =

American politician (born 1958)

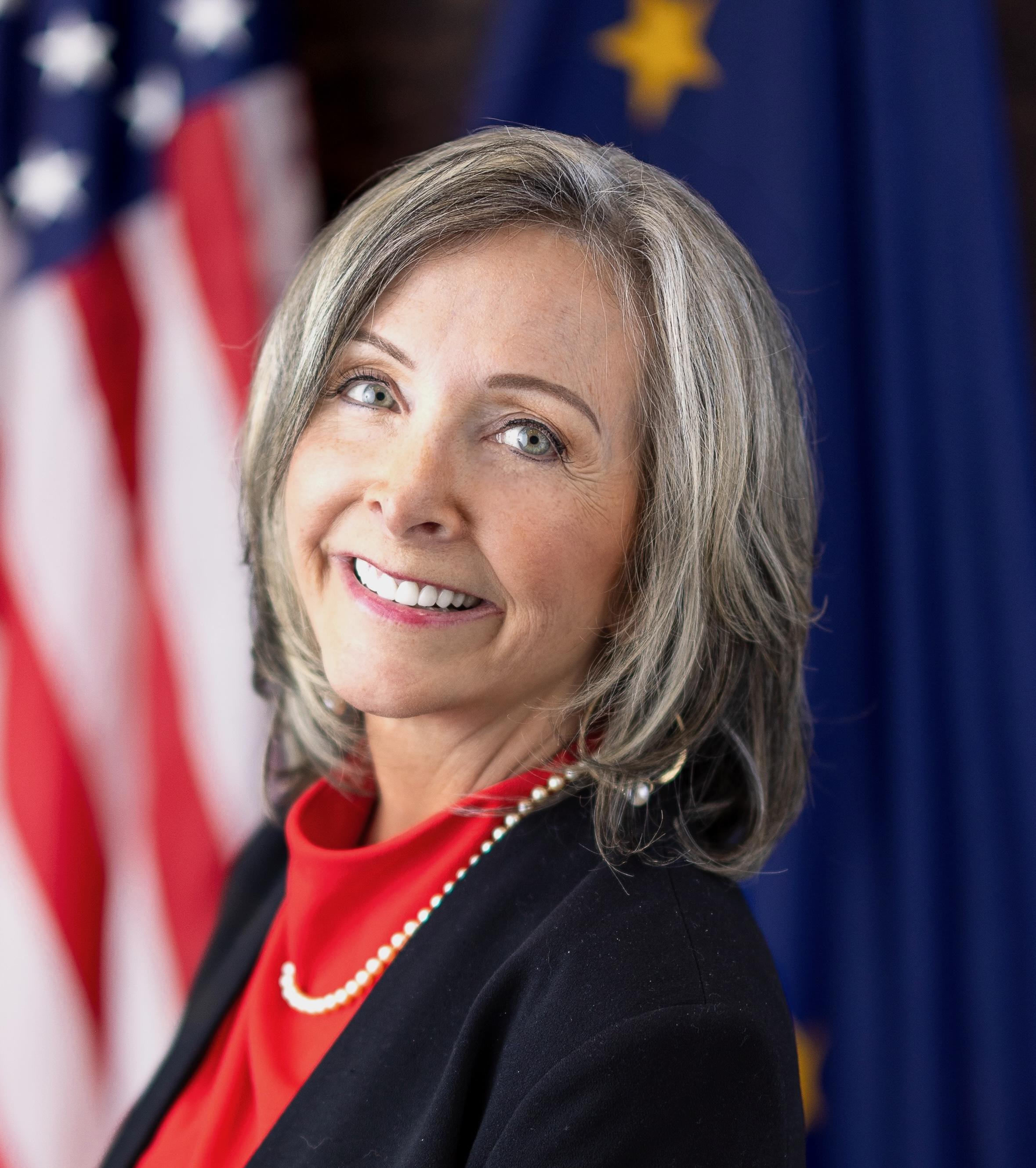
- Hughes in 2025

Minority Leader of the Alaska Senate
- In office January 17, 2023 – January 21, 2025
- Preceded by: Tom Begich
- Succeeded by: Mike Shower

Majority Leader of the Alaska Senate
- In office January 19, 2021 – January 17, 2023
- Preceded by: Lyman Hoffman
- Succeeded by: Cathy Giessel

Member of the Alaska Senate
- In office January 22, 2017 – November 14, 2025
- Preceded by: Bill Stoltze
- Succeeded by: Cathy Tilton
- Constituency: District F (2017–2023); District M (2023–2025)

Member of the Alaska House of Representatives
- In office January 18, 2013 – January 22, 2017
- Preceded by: Carl Gatto (District 13, redistricted)
- Succeeded by: DeLena Johnson
- Constituency: District 8 (2013–2015); District 11 (2015–2017)

Personal details
- Born: January 6, 1958 (age 68) Canton, Ohio, U.S.
- Party: Republican
- Education: Cuyahoga Community College (attended); University of Alaska, Anchorage (BA)
- Website: Campaign website

Shelley Hughes (born January 6, 1958) is an American politician who served as a Republican member of the Alaska Senate from 2017 to 2025. Hughes represented Palmer and other parts of the southern Matanuska-Susitna Borough. She was a member of the Alaska House of Representatives from January 18, 2013, until January 22, 2017.

== Career ==
Hughes has an AA from Cuyahoga Community College and a BA from the University of Alaska.

=== Alaska House of Representatives ===
Hughes was appointed to the Alaska State House of Representatives by Governor Sean Parnell, succeeding the late Representative Carl Gatto, who died on April 10, 2012. Hughes was then elected to the Alaska House of Representatives in 2012, beating Daniel Hamm in the primary election.

=== Alaska Senate ===
Hughes was first elected to the Alaska Senate in its 2016 election. In 2021, she was chosen to be the majority leader of the Alaska Senate. She resigned from the Senate in November 2025 in order to focus on her gubernatorial campaign.

==== Health care ====
In September 2021, Hughes was part of a panel of Alaska legislators focused on health care. Hughes argued that Alaska was "the highest cost location on the globe" for the cost of drug and medical treatment, and said she was looking at pharmacy benefit management and increased price transparency as ways to keep costs down.

==== Transgender athletes ====
In May 2021, Hughes introduced a bill into the Alaska Senate that would ban transgender women and girls from playing in women's sports. The bill required that public schools, or private schools with teams that compete against public schools, have gender-segregated sporting teams and that any participant on the girls' team "must be female, based on the participant's biological sex." Because the bill was introduced in the final few weeks of the legislative session, Hughes announced that she would push for it in the next legislative session instead.

== Personal life ==
Hughes had been married to her husband, Roger Hughes, for 48 years when he died on May 23, 2026. He had served in the a Vietnam War as a combat medic and later worked as a physician's assistant in civilian life. The couple has four grown children and 12 grandchildren.

== Electoral history ==
=== 2020 ===
2020 Alaska Senate election, District F
Primary election
Party	Candidate	Votes	%
Republican	Shelley Hughes	4,759	100.0%
Total votes		4,759	100.0%
General election
Republican	Shelley Hughes (incumbent)	14,751	71.3
Democratic	Jim Cooper (Note: Independent candidate with Democratic nomination)	4,904	23.7
Libertarian	Gavin Christiansen	998	4.8
Write-in	Write-ins	29	0.1
Total votes		20,682	100.0
Republican hold			

=== 2016 ===
2016 Alaska Senate election, District F
Primary election
Party	Candidate	Votes	%
Republican	Shelley Hughes	2,186	48.09%
Republican	Adam Crum	1,885	41.47%
Republican	Steve St. Clair	475	10.45%
Total votes		4,546	100.0%
General election
Republican	Shelley Hughes	12,284	69.69%
Independent	Tim Hale	4,750	27.7%
Write-in	Write-ins	92	0.54%
Total votes		10,829	100.0%

=== 2014 ===
2014 Alaska House of Representatives election, District 11
Primary election
Party	Candidate	Votes	%
Republican	Shelley Hughes	3,402	100.0%
Total votes		3,402	100.0%
General election
Republican	Shelley Hughes	5,268	69.69%
Democratic	Pete LaFrance	2,275	30.10%
Write-in	Write-ins	16	0.21%
Total votes		7,559	100.0%

=== 2012 ===
2012 Alaska House of Representatives election, District 8
Primary election
Party	Candidate	Votes	%
Republican	Shelley Hughes	1,819	71.9%
Republican	Daniel H. Hamm	709	28.1%
Total votes		2,522	100.0
General election
Republican	Shelley Hughes	6,183	95.6%
Write-in	Write-ins	282	4.4%
Total votes		6,465	100.0

== Notes ==
Alaska Senate
Preceded by Lyman Hoffman	Majority Leader of the Alaska Senate; 2021–2023	Succeeded by Cathy Giessel
Preceded by Tom Begich	Minority Leader of the Alaska Senate; 2023–2025	Succeeded by Mike Shower
