= KMXT (FM) =

Coordinates: 57.7890°N 152.4344°W

- Kodiak, Alaska; United States
- Broadcast area: South Central Alaska
- Frequency: 100.1 (MHz) (HD Radio)
- Branding: 100.1 KMXT

Programming
- Format: Public Radio
- Subchannels: HD2: Classical music; HD3: Public news/talk
- Affiliations: National Public Radio; Alaska Public Radio Network; BBC World Service

Ownership
- Owner: Kodiak Public Broadcasting Corp.
- Sister stations: KODK

Technical information
- Licensing authority: FCC
- Facility ID: 35339
- Class: A
- ERP: 271 watts
- HAAT: 311 meters (1,020 ft)

Links
- Public license information: Public file; LMS
- Webcast: Listen Live
- Website: kmxt.org

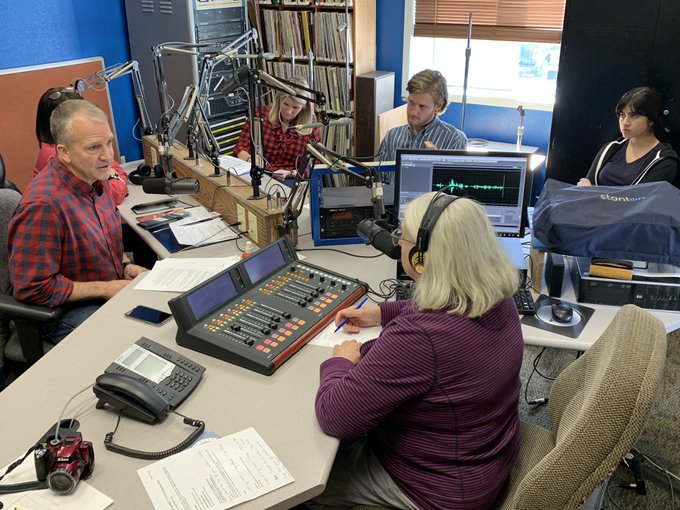
Senator Dan Sullivan on the air at the KMXT studios in 2019.

KMXT (100.1 FM) is an NPR–member non-commercial radio station in Kodiak, Alaska, United States. In addition to its NPR membership, KMXT is also affiliated with the Alaska Public Radio Network and the BBC World Service. It also airs many hours of locally originated news, talk and music programming, and relies heavily on non-paid citizen volunteers to host numerous shows.

== HD programming ==
Currently KMXT broadcasts one analog and three digital signals:

- KMXT-HD1 rebroadcasts the programming from the analog signal.
- KMXT-HD2 classical and jazz.
- KMXT-HD3 KMX3 is a mono news and talk channel.

An HD Radio receiver is required to pick up the digital channels. KMXT also streams its analog signal over the web.

== Translators ==
In addition to five low-powered, separate-frequency translators, one low-powered booster also extends coverage. Boosters are licensed on the same frequency as the parent station but at a different location. They are given the same callsign as the parent station with a number added to differentiate the transmitter site.

Broadcast translator for KMXT
Call sign	Frequency	City of license	FID	ERP (W)	Class	FCC info	Notes
K269AY	101.7 FM	Akhiok, Alaska	35345	9	D	LMS	—
K269AX	101.7 FM	Karluk, Alaska	35343	9	D	LMS	—
K269AW	101.7 FM	Larsen Bay, Alaska	35346	9	D	LMS	—
K269AZ	101.7 FM	Old Harbor, Alaska	35340	9	D	LMS	—
K220AU	91.9 FM	Port Lions, Alaska	35344	9	D	LMS	—
