= Mike Shower =

American politician (born 1968)

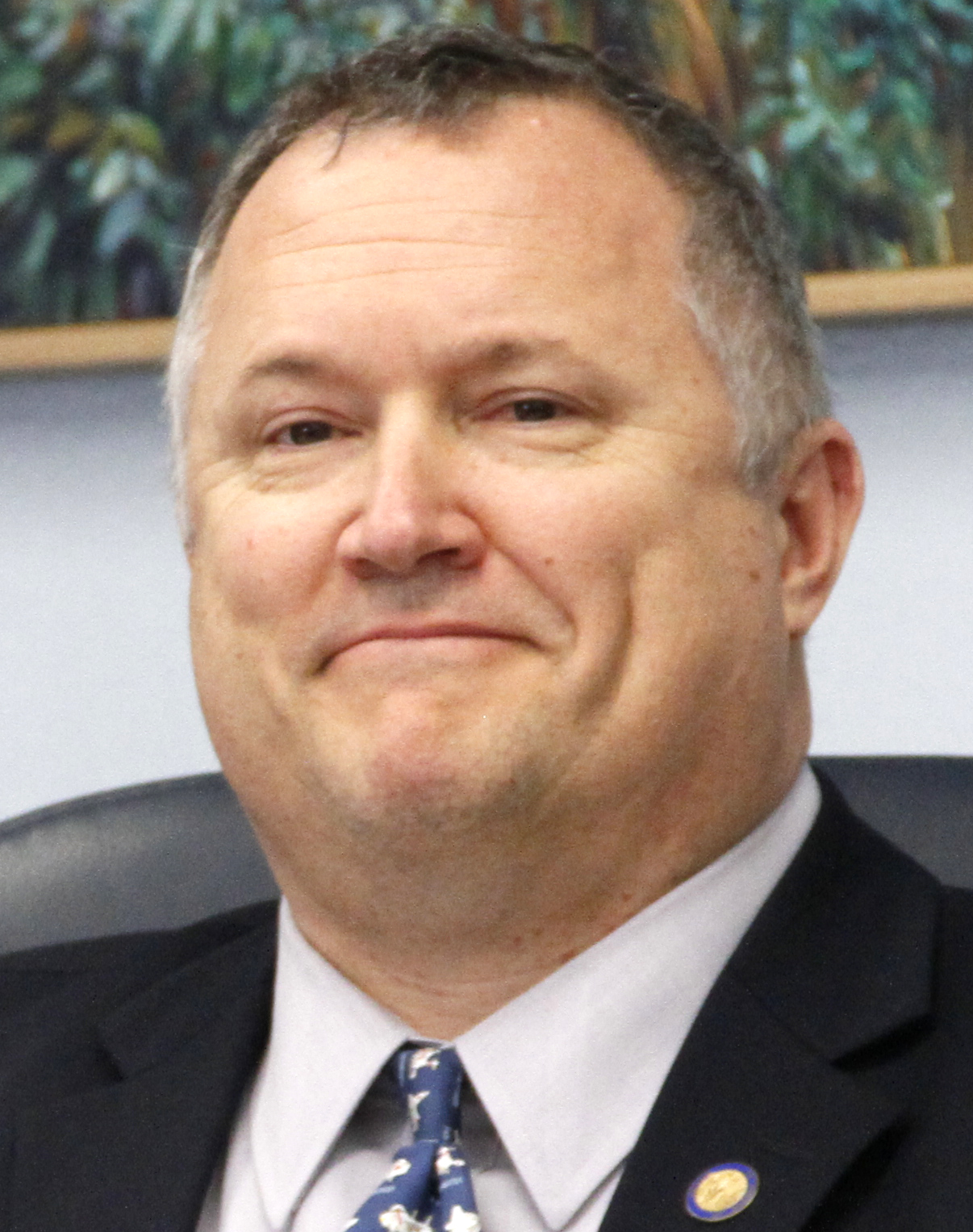
- Shower in 2019

Minority Leader of the Alaska Senate
- In office January 21, 2025 – November 3, 2025
- Preceded by: Shelley Hughes
- Succeeded by: Mike Cronk

Member of the Alaska Senate
- In office February 22, 2018 – November 3, 2025
- Appointed by: Bill Walker
- Preceded by: Mike Dunleavy
- Succeeded by: George Rauscher
- Constituency: District E (2018–2023); District O (2023–2025)

Personal details
- Born: Michael Karl Shower; February 14, 1968 (age 58) Bradenton, Florida, U.S.
- Party: Republican
- Spouse: Michelle Braun
- Education: United States Air Force Academy (BS); Touro University, California (MBA)

Military service
- Allegiance: United States
- Branch/service: United States Air Force
- Years of service: 1990–2010
- Rank: Lieutenant Colonel

Michael Karl "Dozer" Shower (born February 14, 1968) is an American politician and a former Republican member of the Alaska State Senate, serving from 2018 to 2025. Shower was appointed by Governor Bill Walker to fill a vacancy created by Mike Dunleavy, who resigned in order to focus on his run for governor. He represented Valdez and several rural communities in the Matanuska-Susitna Borough, including Willow, Houston, Big Lake, and Sutton. He resigned from the chamber in November 2025 after being named as a lieutenant gubernatorial candidate in the 2026 election.

Shower became a resident of Alaska in 1993. He is an Air Force veteran and a pilot for FedEx. Shower has an MBA from Touro University (in the San Francisco Bay area). He reached the rank of lieutenant colonel as a pilot in the U.S. Air Force, piloting F-15C Eagles and F-22 Raptors.

Alaska Senate
Preceded by Shelley Hughes	Minority Leader of the Alaska Senate; 2025	Succeeded by Mike Cronk
