= Alaska State Senate =

Upper house of the Alaska Legislative

Coordinates: 58.302198°N 134.410467°W

- Alaska State Legislature

Type
- Type: Upper house
- Term limits: None

History
- New session started: January 21, 2025

Leadership
- President: Gary Stevens (R-C) since January 17, 2023
- Majority Leader: Cathy Giessel (R-C) since January 17, 2023
- Minority Leader: Mike Cronk (R) since December 16, 2025

Structure
- Seats: 20
- Political groups: Majority coalition: Democratic (9); Republican (5); Minority caucus: Republican (6)
- Length of term: 4 years
- Authority: Article 2, Alaska Constitution
- Salary: $50,400/year + per diem ($200/day, in session)

Elections
- Voting system: Nonpartisan blanket primary / Ranked-choice voting (Since 2022)
- Last election: November 5, 2024 (10 seats: B, D, F, H, J, L, N, P, R, T)
- Next election: November 3, 2026 (10 seats: districts A, C, E, G, I, K, M, O, Q, S)
- Redistricting: Alaska Redistricting Board

Meeting place
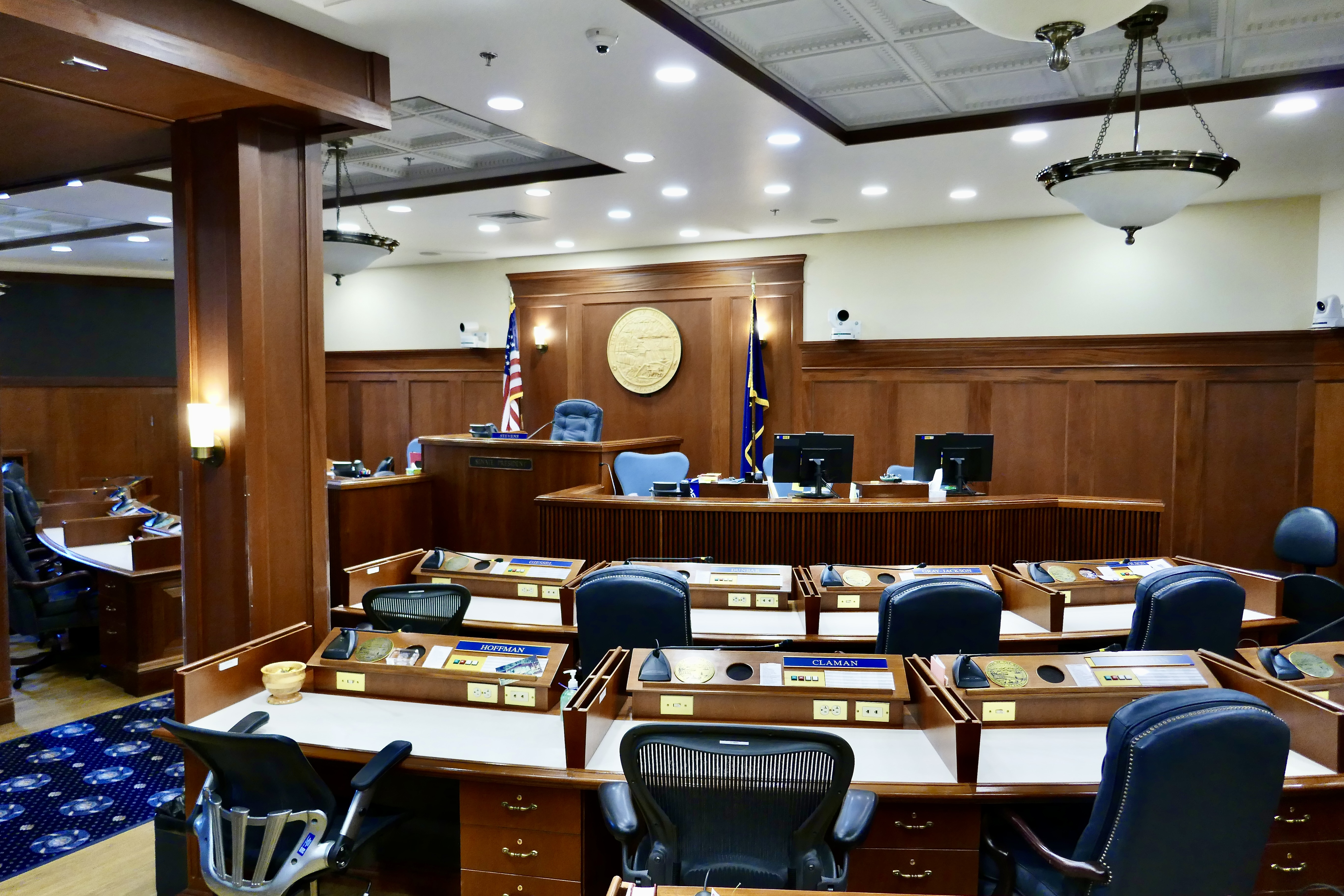
- State Senate Chamber; Alaska State Capitol; Juneau, Alaska

Website
- Alaska State Senate

Rules
- Alaska State Legislature Uniform Rules

The Alaska State Senate is the upper house in the Alaska State Legislature, the state legislature of the U.S. state of Alaska. It convenes in the Alaska State Capitol in Juneau, Alaska and is responsible for making laws and confirming or rejecting gubernatorial appointments to the state cabinet, commissions and boards.

With just twenty members, the Alaska Senate is the smallest state legislative chamber in the United States. Its members serve four-year terms and each represent an equal number of districts with populations of approximately 36,804 people, per 2020 census figures. They are not subject to term limits.

== Powers and legislative process ==
The Alaska Senate shares the responsibility for making laws in the state of Alaska with the Alaska House of Representatives. Bills are developed by staff from bill requests and information from the bill's sponsor. Bills undergo three or four readings during the legislative process. After the first reading, they are assigned to committee. Committees can amend measures or hold legislation and prevent it from reaching the Senate floor. Once a committee has weighed in on a piece of legislation, the bill returns to the floor for second hearing and a third hearing, which happens just before the floor vote on it.

Once passed by the Senate, a bill is sent to the opposite legislative house for consideration. If approved, without amendment, it is sent to the governor. If there is amendment, however, the Senate may either reconsider the bill with amendments or ask for the establishment of a conference committee to work out differences in the versions of the bill passed by each chamber. Once a piece of legislation approved by both houses is forwarded to the governor, it may either be signed or vetoed. If it is signed, it takes effect on the effective date of the legislation. If it is vetoed, lawmakers in a joint session may override the veto with a two-thirds majority vote (three-fourths majority is required if it is an appropriations bill).

For gubernatorial nominees requiring confirmation, the Alaska Senate sits in joint session with the Alaska House and the two bodies vote together on confirmation, with each representative and senator having one vote.

== Committees ==
Current committees include:

- Education
- Judiciary
- Resources
- State Affairs
- Transportation
- Committee On Committees
- Community & Regional Affairs
- World Trade
- Labor & Commerce
- Rules
- Health & Social Services
- Finance
- Corrections
- Court System
- Military & Veterans' Affairs
- Labor & Workforce Development
- Governor
- Health & Social Services
- Environmental Conservation
- Public Safety
- Commerce, Community & Economic Dev
- Natural Resources
- Administration
- Law
- Fish & Game
- Education & Early Development
- Revenue
- Transportation & Public Facilities
- University Of Alaska
- Legislature

== Current composition ==
Affiliation	Party (Shading indicates majority caucus)				Total	Vacant
Affiliation	Democratic		Republican		Total	Vacant
End 29th legislature	5	1	14		20	0
30th legislature	5	1	14		20	0
31st Legislature	6	1	13		20	0
32nd Legislature	6	1	13		20	0
33rd Legislature	9		8	3	20	0
Begin 34th Legislature	9		5	6	20	0
November 3, 2025 (Note: Mike Shower resigned on November 3, 2025.)	9		5	5	19	1
November 14, 2025 (Note: Shelley Hughes resigned on November 14, 2025.)	9		5	4	18	2
November 29, 2025 (Note: George Rauscher and Cathy Tilton were confirmed to succeed Shower and Hughes respectively.)	9		5	6	20	0
Latest voting share	70%			30%		

Past partisan compositions can be found on Political party strength in Alaska.

== Membership ==
=== Qualifications and terms ===
Senators must be a qualified voter and resident of Alaska for no less than three years, and a resident of the district from which elected for one year immediately preceding filing for office. A senator must be at least 25 years old at the time the oath of office is taken.

Senators may expel a member with the concurrence of two-thirds of the membership of the body. This has happened only once in Senate history. On February 5, 1982, the Senate of the 12th Legislature expelled Bethel senator George Hohman from the body. Hohman was convicted of bribery in conjunction with his legislative duties on December 24, 1981, and had defiantly refused to resign from his seat. Expulsion was not a consideration during the 2003–2010 Alaska political corruption probe, as Ben Stevens and John Cowdery were the only Senators who were subjects of the probe and neither sought reelection in 2008.

Legislative terms begin on the second Monday in January following a presidential election year and on the third Tuesday in January following a gubernatorial election. The term of senators is four years and half of the senators are up for election every two years.

=== Leadership ===
The President of the Senate presides over the body, appointing members to all of the Senate's committees and joint committees, and may create other committees and subcommittees if desired. Unlike many other states, the Lieutenant Governor of Alaska does not preside over the Senate. Instead, the Lieutenant Governor oversees the Alaska Division of Elections, fulfilling the role of Secretary of State. Only two other states, Hawaii and Utah, have similar constitutional arrangements for their lieutenant governors. The other partisan Senate leadership positions, such as the Majority and Minority leaders, are (usually) elected by their respective party caucuses to head their parties in the chamber.

==== Current leadership ====
Position	Name	Party	Caucus	District
President	Gary Stevens	Rep	Majority	C
Majority Leader	Cathy Giessel	Rep	Majority	E
Minority Leader	Mike Cronk	Rep	Minority	R

=== Members of the 34th Senate ===
Alaska State Senate 34th Alaska State Legislature, 2025–2026
District	Name	Party	Caucus	Residence	Start	Next Election
A	Bert Stedman	Rep	Majority	Sitka	2003 (Note: Senator was originally appointed)	2026
B	Jesse Kiehl	Dem	Majority	Juneau	2019	2028
C	Gary Stevens	Rep	Majority	Kodiak	2003	2026
D	Jesse Bjorkman	Rep	Majority	Nikiski	2023	2028
E	Cathy Giessel	Rep	Majority	Anchorage	2023 (2011–2021)	2026
F	James Kaufman	Rep	Minority	Anchorage	2023	2028
G	Elvi Gray-Jackson	Dem	Majority	Anchorage	2019	2026
H	Matt Claman	Dem	Majority	Anchorage	2023	2028
I	Löki Tobin	Dem	Majority	Anchorage	2023	2026
J	Forrest Dunbar	Dem	Majority	Anchorage	2023	2028
K	Bill Wielechowski	Dem	Majority	Anchorage	2007	2026
L	Kelly Merrick	Rep	Majority	Eagle River	2023	2028
M	Cathy Tilton	Rep	Minority	Wasilla	2025	2026
N	Robert Yundt	Rep	Minority	Wasilla	2025	2028
O	George Rauscher	Rep	Minority	Sutton	2025	2026
P	Scott Kawasaki	Dem	Majority	Fairbanks	2019	2028
Q	Robert Myers	Rep	Minority	North Pole	2021	2026
R	Mike Cronk	Rep	Minority	Tok	2025	2028
S	Lyman Hoffman	Dem	Majority	Bethel	1995	2026
T	Donny Olson	Dem	Majority	Golovin	2001	2028

== See also ==
- Alaska House of Representatives
- Alaska State Capitol
- List of Alaska State Legislatures
- Impeachment in Alaska
