= Alaska Attorney General =

US state official

- Incumbent; Cori Mills; Acting since May 14, 2026
- Member of: Government of Alaska
- Reports to: Governor of Alaska
- Appointer: Governor of Alaska
- First holder: George B. Grigsby
- Succession: Second
- Website: law.state.ak.us

The Alaska attorney general is the chief legal advisor to the government of the State of Alaska and to its governor. The attorney general is appointed by the governor and confirmed by the Alaska Legislature. The position has existed since the early days of the Territory of Alaska, though it was an elected rather than an appointed position prior to statehood. The attorney general also serves as the Commissioner of the Alaska Department of Law, and is the only commissioner of a principal department of Alaska state government not referred to as "Commissioner" in normal usage.

== List of attorneys general ==
In the earliest days of the Alaska Territory, the Territorial Counsel served as the de facto attorney general. Only one person, John H. Cobb, served in this position. The 2nd Alaska Territorial Legislature in 1915 created the Office of the Attorney General, to become effective after the 1916 general election. The attorney general's position was an elected position during the entirety of territorial days, as opposed to under statehood, in which it has been a position appointed by the governor since 1959. The following is a list of attorneys general in Alaska.

=== Alaska Territory ===
Name	Image	Term of office	Governor(s)
George Barnes Grigsby		1916–1919	Strong, Riggs
Jeremiah C. Murphy		1919–1920	Riggs
John Rustgard		1920–1933	Riggs, Bone, Parks
James S. Truitt		1933–1941	Troy, Gruening
Henry Roden		1941–1945	Gruening
Ralph Julian Rivers		1945–1949	Gruening
J. Gerald Williams		1949–1959	Gruening, Heintzleman, Stepovich

=== State of Alaska ===
Name	Image	Term of office	Governor(s)
John Rader		1959–1960	Egan
Ralph E. Moody		1960–1962	Egan
George N. Hayes		1962–1964	Egan
Warren C. Colver		1964–1966	Egan
Donald A. Burr		1966–1967	Hickel
Edgar Paul Boyko		1967–1968	Hickel
G. Kent Edwards		1968–1970	Hickel
G. Kent Edwards		1968–1970	Miller
John E. Havelock		1970–1973	Egan
Norman C. Gorsuch		1973–1974	Egan
Avrum M. Gross		1974–1980	Hammond
Wilson L. Condon		1980–1982	Hammond
Norman C. Gorsuch		1982–1985	Sheffield
Harold M. Brown		1985–1986	Sheffield
Grace Berg Schaible		1987–1989	Cowper
Douglas Baily		1989–1990	Cowper
Charlie Cole		1991–1994	Hickel
Bruce Botelho		1994–2002	Hickel
Bruce Botelho		1994–2002	Knowles
Gregg Renkes		2002–2005	Murkowski
David W. Márquez		2005–2006	Murkowski
Talis J. Colberg		2006–2009	Palin
Dan Sullivan		2009–2010	Palin
Dan Sullivan		2009–2010	Parnell
John J. Burns		2010–2012	Parnell
Michael Geraghty		2012–2014	Parnell
Craig W. Richards		2014–2016	Walker
Jahna Lindemuth		2016–2018	Walker
Kevin Clarkson		2018–2020	Dunleavy
Ed Sniffen (acting)		2020–2021	Dunleavy
Treg Taylor		2021–2025	Dunleavy
Stephen J. Cox (acting)		2025–2026	Dunleavy
Cori Mills (acting)		2026–present	Dunleavy
