= Alaska Highway Veterans =

Segregated group of 4,000 African American soldiers and engineers

The Alaska Highway Veterans is a group of roughly 4,000 segregated African American soldiers in the United States Army Corps of Engineers who helped build the Alaska Highway in 1942. The highway's successful construction is seen by many as an important factor in the 1948 decision to desegregate the military.

== History ==
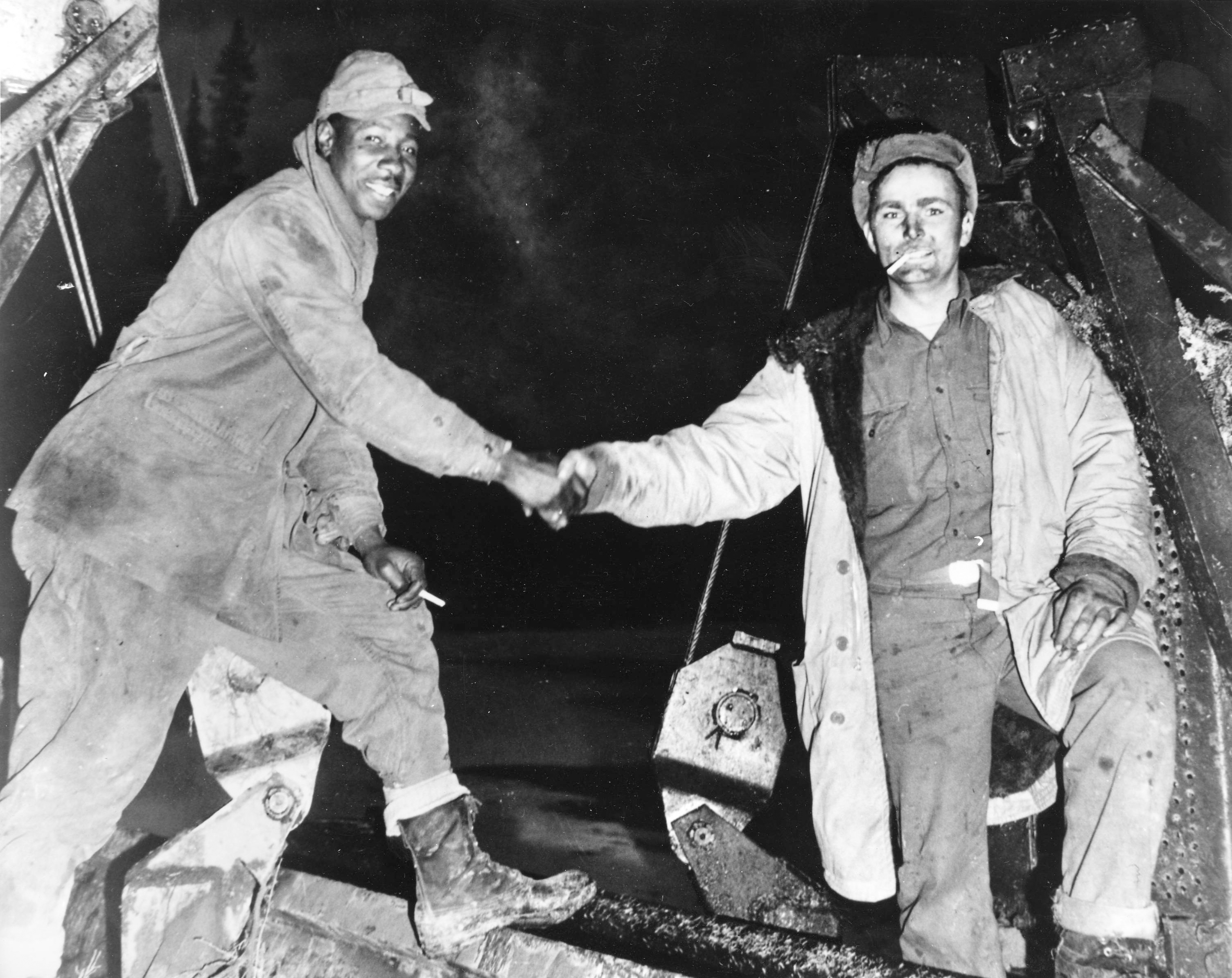
An African American soldier of the Alaska Highway Veterans shaking the hand of a fellow soldier, meeting in the middle after completing construction of the Alaska Highway.

The directive to construct the Alaska Highway was authorized by President Franklin D. Roosevelt in February 1942. At the time, the majority of the Army's engineers were assigned elsewhere as part of the World War II effort. Although many in the military during that period viewed African American engineers as less skilled, the lack of resources prompted the employment of regiments of African American engineers on the project. A total of 11,000 troops worked on the highway's construction, segregated into three African American regiments and four white regiments.

The project concluded on October 25, 1942, with an African American soldier and a white soldier shaking hands as the final link of the highway was completed. In 2017, Governor Bill Walker of Alaska signed Senate Bill 46 into law commemorating the contribution of the Alaska Highway Veterans. Upon the bill's signing, Walker stated, "It’s not my words. It’s the federal government’s words that this highway really was the road to civil rights."
