= Jahna Lindemuth =

American politician

31st Attorney General of Alaska
- In office August 8, 2016 – December 5, 2018
- Governor: Bill Walker
- Preceded by: Jim Clark (Acting)
- Succeeded by: Kevin Clarkson

Personal details
- Born: Jahna Marie McGranahan; October 3, 1969 (age 56) Anchorage, Alaska, U.S.
- Party: Independent
- Education: University of Alaska, Anchorage (BS); University of California, Berkeley (JD)

Jahna Lindemuth (born October 3, 1969) is an American attorney who served as the 31st Alaska Attorney General. Lindemuth was appointed by Alaska Governor Bill Walker on June 28, 2016, following the resignation of previous Attorney General Craig Richards.

== Career ==
Prior to her appointment as Alaska Attorney General, Lindemuth was Managing Partner of the Anchorage office of Dorsey & Whitney. In January, 2016, Lindemuth spoke to the media as a representative of Dorsey & Whitney, following the deliberate crash of an Alaska Civil Air Patrol plane into the firms downtown Anchorage offices. The crash was determined to be an act of suicide by the husband of a member of the firm.

Lindemuth was actively involved in the defense of the Fairbanks Four. She helped gain the men's freedom after they spent many years in prison for a murder conviction in which they were not guilty.

== See also ==
- List of female state attorneys general in the United States

Legal offices
Preceded by Jim Clark; Acting	Attorney General of Alaska; 2016–2018	Succeeded by Kevin Clarkson
