= Ed Sniffen =

American lawyer

Acting Attorney General of Alaska
- In office August 25, 2020 – January 30, 2021
- Governor: Mike Dunleavy
- Preceded by: Kevin Clarkson
- Succeeded by: Treg Taylor

Personal details
- Born: Clyde Edward Sniffen Jr.
- Education: Willamette University (JD)

Clyde "Ed" Sniffen Jr. is an American attorney who served as acting Alaska attorney general from August 25, 2020, to January 30, 2021, in the administration of Republican Governor Mike Dunleavy. Sniffen had assumed office after the resignation of his predecessor, Kevin Clarkson, amid allegations of texting with an employee of the governor's office. Sniffen resigned in January 2021 after allegations of the existence of an inappropriate relationship with a 17-year-old high school girl whom he coached in 1991 surfaced. Prosecutors formally charged Sniffen with three counts of sexual abuse of a minor in connection with the allegations in Alaska on May 27, 2022.

== Career ==
Sniffen earned a Juris Doctor from the Willamette University College of Law. After graduating from law school, he worked as a private attorney. He joined the office of the Alaska Attorney General in 2000, specializing in antitrust and consumer protection litigation. Prior to serving as acting Attorney General, Sniffen served as assistant attorney general, deputy attorney general, and chief of staff to his predecessor, Kevin Clarkson.

Sniffen, who had previously served as deputy Attorney General, succeeded Kevin Clarkson, who resigned from office after allegations of Clarkson's texting with an employee in the governor's office who was not a subordinate.

=== Attorney general of Alaska ===
Sniffen served in an acting capacity while the governor searched for a permanent replacement. Alaska Governor Mike Dunleavy designated Sniffen as his permanent nominee for Attorney General on January 18, 2021, subject to confirmation by the legislature. However, on January 30, Sniffen withdrew his nomination due to allegations that he had an inappropriate relationship with a 17-year-old girl in 1991, who is now in her late 40s. The woman lived with Sniffen for a period of years after she turned 18.

== Personal ==
His marriage to Stacy Steinberg was dissolved in May 2000. They had no children.

Legal offices
Preceded by Kevin Clarkson	Attorney General of Alaska; Acting; 2020–2021	Succeeded by Treg Taylor
