= Richard K. Allen =

American lawyer

District Attorney of Anchorage
- In office October 17, 2017 – December 18, 2018
- Appointed by: Jahna Lindemuth
- Preceded by: Clint Campion
- Succeeded by: John Novak

Personal details
- Born: c. 1974 (age 50–51); Fairbanks, Alaska, U.S.
- Education: University of Texas at San Antonio (BA); University of Idaho (JD)

Richard K. Allen is an American attorney who served as district attorney of Anchorage, Alaska. He was appointed to the position in October 2017, replacing Clint Campion, who resigned on October 6, 2017, citing personal reasons.

== Early life and education ==
Allen was born and raised in Fairbanks, Alaska. During high school, he spent one year as an exchange student in Johannesburg. He graduated with a degree in political science from the University of Texas at San Antonio in 1996 and received a Juris Doctor from University of Idaho College of Law in 2000.

== Career ==
Allen worked in private practice from September 2000 to December 2003.

Allen began his career in Alaska in 2004 as an assistant district attorney in the Palmer District Attorney office. In 2011, Allen became director of the Office of Public Advocacy (OPA) within the Alaska Department of Administration.

Allen resigned as Anchorage district attorney in December 2018 at the request of Attorney General Kevin G. Clarkson, who replaced Lindemuth the same month, and returned to the Palmer District Attorney's Office. He was succeeded by John Novak, a former assistant district attorney in Anchorage.
