= Cori Mills =

American lawyer

Acting Attorney General of Alaska
- Incumbent
- Assumed office May 14, 2026
- Governor: Mike Dunleavy
- Preceded by: Stephen J. Cox (acting)

Personal details
- Party: Republican
- Education: Scripps College (BA); University of the Pacific (JD)

Cori Mills is an American attorney who has served as the attorney general of Alaska since May 2026.

== Education ==
Mills holds a bachelor’s degree in political science from Scripps College and a Juris Doctor degree from McGeorge School of Law.

== Career ==
Prior to her government career, Mills spent four years working in environmental law in Sacramento, California.

Mills has worked in the Alaska Department of Law since 2012. In 2021, she was appointed deputy attorney general. In May 2026, Governor Mike Dunleavy named Mills acting attorney general, succeeding Stephen J. Cox.

== Personal life ==
Mills is married and has two children. Her family resides in Juneau.

Legal offices
Preceded by Stephen J. Cox; Acting	Attorney General of Alaska; Acting; 2026–present	Incumbent
