= Stephen J. Cox =

American lawyer

Steve Cox
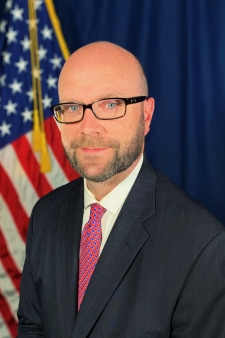
- Official portrait, 2020

Acting Attorney General of Alaska
- In office August 29, 2025 – May 14, 2026
- Governor: Mike Dunleavy
- Preceded by: Treg Taylor
- Succeeded by: Cori Mills (acting)

United States Attorney for the Eastern District of Texas
- In office June 1, 2020 – January 20, 2021
- President: Donald Trump
- Preceded by: Joseph D. Brown
- Succeeded by: Nicholas Ganjei (acting)

Personal details
- Born: 1977 or 1978 (age 48–49)
- Party: Republican
- Education: Texas A&M University (BS); University of Houston (JD)

Stephen J. Cox (born August 2, 1977) is an American lawyer who has served as Counsel to Alaska Governor Mike Dunleavy since May 2026. He previously served as the 28th Alaska Attorney General from August 29, 2025, until May 14, 2026, when the Alaska Legislature failed to confirm him in a 29–31 vote. Cox previously served as the United States Attorney for the Eastern District of Texas after being appointed by U.S. Attorney General Bill Barr and in senior positions at the United States Department of Justice. Before joining Alaska state government, he worked in the private sector, most recently as a senior vice president and chief legal and strategy officer at Bristol Bay Industrial.

During his tenure as attorney general, Cox described an agenda centered on public safety, consumer protection, constitutional liberties—especially “First Freedoms”—and increasing Alaska's energy and economic-development potential. His tenure included a state-local Quality of Life Initiative in Anchorage, several consumer-protection initiatives, implementation of Governor Dunleavy's regulatory-reform program, resource and navigability litigation, and participation in multistate constitutional litigation. Cox also began what he called a Counter-China Initiative aimed at applying state consumer-protection and regulatory authority to risks involving Chinese-connected products, technology, infrastructure and financial services.

His appointment became the subject of an unusually contentious confirmation process. Democrats in the Legislature objected to aspects of his nationally focused litigation, including briefs involving birthright citizenship, and questioned other policy decisions made during his tenure; supporters pointed to his public-safety work and argued that federal constitutional cases could directly affect Alaska. After his tenure as Attorney General, Dunleavy appointed Cox as the first Counsel to the Governor and named Cox’s Deputy Attorney General Cori Mills as acting attorney general.

== Early Life, Education, and Legal Career ==
Cox graduated from Texas A&M University in 2000 with a Bachelor of Science in computer science and from the University of Houston Law Center in 2006 with a Juris Doctor degree, summa cum laude. After graduating from law school, Cox was a law clerk to judge James Larry Edmondson of the U.S. Court of Appeals for the Eleventh Circuit.

Cox graduated from Texas A&M University in 2000 with a Bachelor of Science in computer science and from the University of Houston Law Center in 2006 with a Juris Doctor degree, summa cum laude. He subsequently clerked for James Larry Edmondson of the U.S. Court of Appeals for the Eleventh Circuit.

Earlier in his career, Cox worked in the federal government, including as a senior adviser to the director of U.S. Immigration and Customs Enforcement. He also worked with the William H. Webster Commission that reviewed the FBI's handling of intelligence relating to the 2009 Fort Hood shooting. He later entered private practice, working on white-collar investigations, regulatory matters, compliance and related litigation.

During the first Trump administration, Cox served at the Department of Justice as deputy associate attorney general and chief of staff in the Office of the Associate Attorney General. His responsibilities included corporate-enforcement policy, regulatory reform, and matters involving financial and health-care fraud. He also served as executive director of the Department's regulatory-reform task force. In 2020, he became United States Attorney for the Eastern District of Texas, serving until the change of presidential administrations in January 2021. Cox subsequently worked in the private sector. Immediately before his Alaska appointment, he was senior vice president and chief legal and strategy officer at Bristol Bay Industrial, an investment platform of Bristol Bay Native Corporation. When Governor Mike Dunleavy appointed him attorney general in August 2025, Cox told Alaska Public Media that he had worked on Alaska-related matters since 2011.

== Attorney General of Alaska ==
Dunleavy announced Cox's appointment on August 28, 2025, with the appointment effective the following day. Because Alaska cabinet officials are subject to legislative confirmation, Cox served while his confirmation remained pending.

In public remarks, Cox described four principal areas of emphasis: public safety, consumer protection, protecting what he called “First Freedoms,” and “unleashing” Alaska's economic or energy potential. Legislative material from early 2026 also records Cox describing increased investment and Alaska's development potential as a priority.

== Public Safety ==
One of Cox's principal public-safety projects was the Quality of Life Initiative, a state-local effort in Anchorage developed over several months in late 2025 and publicly announced by Dunleavy during his January 2026 State of the State address. Associated Press reporting described the initiative as a partnership between state and municipal officials directed at recurring quality-of-life offenses, including repeat retail theft, public drug activity, illegal camping and related public disorder, while also increasing coordination on drug interdiction and violent crime.

A central feature was closer coordination between the Department of Law, Anchorage municipal prosecutors, the Anchorage Police Department and other state agencies. The arrangement included cross-designating municipal prosecutors so they could pursue state felony cases in circumstances in which repeat retail theft or related conduct crossed state-law thresholds. Alaska News Source later reported that Cox and Anchorage Municipal Attorney Eva Gardner described the initiative as an effort to make fuller use of existing criminal-law tools against repeat offenders.

The initiative also placed emphasis on drug interdiction in a state where a limited number of air and transportation routes serve as major gateways into remote communities. In early 2026, Cox wrote Alaska Airlines chief executive Ben Minicucci about reports that company policies discouraged employees from voluntarily cooperating with law enforcement in drug-trafficking or other investigations. In the letter, Cox sought greater real-time cooperation in response.

== Consumer Protection ==
Under Cox’s leadership, the Department of Law increased the consumer-protection agenda. For example, in January 2026 it announced a statewide grocery-pricing compliance initiative involving announced and unannounced price checks to determine whether advertised or posted grocery prices corresponded with prices charged at checkout.

In March, the Department sued six online charitable-fundraising or financial-technology platforms—GoFundMe, PayPal, Charity Navigator, JustGiving, Pledge.to and Network for Good. The State alleged that the companies had created fundraising pages associated with Alaska charities without the charities' knowledge or consent and had solicited donations in ways that could implicate Alaska's charitable-solicitation and consumer-protection laws.The Alaska Story, in reporting on the suits, noted the contrast between GoFundMe’s effort to facilitate donations to Alaska nonprofits and earlier controversies in which the platform had removed certain conservative-linked fundraising campaigns.

Later that month, Alaska resolved a consumer-protection case against Swickard automobile dealerships. The State had alleged that dealerships advertised unavailable vehicles or prices that were not honored and imposed undisclosed dealer add-ons. The settlement provided for a $1 million civil penalty with $200,000 of that penalty suspended on the condition that the defendants avoid specified future violations.

The Department also questioned automatic “round-up” charitable programs used by electric utilities. An October 2025 consumer alert argued that automatically enrolling customers unless they opted out raised both consumer-consent concerns and potential compelled-speech or compelled-subsidy questions. The Department did not characterize participation in charitable giving itself as unlawful; its objection centered on automatic enrollment without affirmative consent.

In June 2026, after Cox had moved to the Governor’s Office, Alaska joined the Federal Trade Commission and the states of Texas, Iowa and Nebraska in litigation against the World Professional Association for Transgender Health. The complaint alleged deceptive representations concerning gender-related medical treatment for minors. The case was filed during Mills’s tenure as acting attorney general.

== Counter China Initiative ==
During his tenure as Attorney General, Cox began what he called a Counter-China Initiative. He described the project as examining how state consumer-protection, licensing and regulatory authorities could respond to risks associated with products, technology, financial services, data and infrastructure connected to the People's Republic of China. National Review reported on the initiative as an effort to use ordinary state consumer-protection powers as an additional means of addressing national-security concerns involving China. After becoming Counsel to the Governor, Cox told the bipartisan Congressional-Executive Commission on China that he intended to continue that work.

At a June 4, 2026 Commission hearing, Cox specifically discussed Airwallex, a cross-border payment company whose relationship to China had been questioned by U.S. Senator Tom Cotton. Cox said that he shared concerns about potential access to sensitive American financial information and had begun discussions in Alaska about whether state regulators should scrutinize foreign-adversary-connected money transmitters more closely. A video clip of the testimony circulated publicly afterward.

The initiative also included concerns about Chinese-manufactured vaping products sold in the United States without federal authorization, with Alaska participating in efforts directed at the consumer-protection and public-health implications of those products.

== Constitutional Liberties ==
Cox used the phrase “First Freedoms” to describe a portion of his agenda involving speech, religion and related constitutional rights. One concrete application was the Department's utility round-up policy. The Department argued that requiring customers to take affirmative steps to avoid making charitable contributions could raise First Amendment concerns as well as ordinary consumer-consent issues.

Cox also objected after copies of the U.S. Constitution distributed at an Anchorage School District event were accompanied by a disclaimer distancing the district from the material. The district subsequently apologized, characterized the incident as a mistake, and said it would take steps to prevent a recurrence.

Alaska also co-led with Iowa a multistate amicus brief in litigation involving Connecticut public- school teacher Marisol Arroyo-Castro, who challenged school officials’ restrictions on her display of a crucifix and other religious expression. The case raised First Amendment questions concerning religious expression by public employees in schools.

Cox also participated in national constitutional litigation through multistate amicus briefs and other filings. The amicus briefs became a central subject of his confirmation hearings, with Democratic legislators arguing that the Department was devoting too much attention to disputes arising outside Alaska, while Cox and his supporters maintained that federal appellate precedents could affect Alaska regardless of where a case originated.

== Regulatory and resource policy ==
In September 2025, Cox announced the Department of Law's role in implementing Dunleavy's Administrative Order 360, a government-wide regulatory-review program. The order called for executive agencies to inventory discretionary regulatory requirements, establish reduction targets and participate in an annual unified regulatory plan. The Department also reviewed nonbinding guidance, FAQs and informal agency policies—material the administration referred to as “regulatory dark matter”—to determine whether agencies were effectively imposing requirements without formal rulemaking. The initiative also included permitting reform and public-comment procedures.

Cox's tenure also included litigation concerning Alaska's claims to submerged lands beneath navigable waters. In December 2025, the Department announced resolution of a long-running dispute concerning the Fortymile River, describing the agreement as recognition of Alaska's statehood-era rights to submerged lands under navigable portions of the river.

Cox also advocated limiting the ability of states and local governments to use tort litigation to influence national energy policy. In an opinion essay first published in the Washington Post and later republished in Alaska, he argued that climate-related litigation such as the litigation involving Chevron and Plaquemines Parish raised federalism and extraterritoriality concerns. That argument formed part of Alaska's broader participation in multistate litigation involving energy development and federal-state authority.

In April 2026, Cox joined attorneys general from other states in a letter to Fitch Ratings questioning the use of environmental, social and governance factors in credit-rating practices. The letter argued that ESG-related assessments could create legal or policy concerns when they affected states or companies engaged in conventional energy development.

Cox also sent letters to major insurers questioning underwriting policies that restricted coverage for Arctic and fossil-fuel development. The letters argued that insurance restrictions could affect projects in Alaska even after federal policy reopened areas such as the Arctic National Wildlife Refuge to development. Fox News reported on the initiative and the administration’s contention that private underwriting policies were being used to influence energy policy.

== Outside Counsel Changes ==
Cox also changed Alaska's use of outside plaintiffs' firms in major contingency-fee litigation. Reuters reported in January 2026 that Alaska terminated Baron & Budd for cause from litigation involving PFAS chemicals, citing what the State said were contractual conflict issues. Baron & Budd disputed that it had violated its obligations.

The termination followed Cox's October 2025 decision to end the State's relationship with Motley Rice in opioid litigation. The State asserted that confidentiality or conflict provisions had been violated. Reuters described the Baron & Budd decision as the second such termination under Cox.

== Investigative Grand Juries and Originalism ==
In 2026, Cox publicly addressed a long-running dispute over Alaska's investigative-grand-jury process and the procedures governing citizen requests for grand-jury investigations. In an essay published during the rulemaking controversy, he described his understanding of the attorney general's legal responsibilities and argued that the issue should be resolved through constitutional text, legal history, separation-of-powers principles and the governing court rules.

Cox also participated in a May 2026 Federalist Society program on originalism and state constitutions with jurists and academics including Notre Dame law professor Richard Garnett. The program included discussion of originalist approaches to Alaska constitutional questions.

== Confirmation ==
Cox underwent legislative hearings during the 2026 session as lawmakers considered his confirmation. The proceedings became unusually contentious, with Democratic legislators examining both Alaska-specific management questions and the Department's participation in national constitutional litigation.

Critics focused in part on the number and subject matter of multistate briefs joined during Cox's tenure. Senator Löki Tobin cited a brief supporting federal restrictions on birthright citizenship as an example of what she characterized as attention to national political disputes rather than Alaska matters. Senate President Gary Stevens also cited the birthright-citizenship filing in explaining his opposition.

Another subject of questioning was Cox’s appointment of a solicitor general from outside Alaska. The appointee had previously served as a deputy solicitor general in Indiana and an assistant solicitor general in Kentucky. During Senate Judiciary proceedings, Tobin questioned why Cox had not recruited locally and raised Alaska-based legal-education options as an alternative.

Lawmakers also questioned legal advice surrounding Alaska's agreement to provide the U.S. Department of Justice with an unredacted voter-registration file. Civil-rights organizations later challenged the disclosure in federal court, alleging violations of privacy and due-process protections. State officials defended the sharing as lawful under Alaska statutes. Opposition outside the Legislature included public advocacy by Anchorage attorney Scott Kendall, former Democratic Alaska Attorney General Bruce Botelho, and blogger Dermot Cole. Kendall argued in a January 2026 Anchorage Daily News opinion essay that Cox was devoting too much attention to national conservative litigation rather than Alaska matters. Botelho also publicly opposed Cox’s confirmation, including in interviews and legislative advocacy. Cole published numerous blog posts criticizing Cox’s record and urging legislators not to confirm him.

Cox's supporters argued that nationally decided constitutional and administrative-law cases often have direct consequences for Alaska. Representative Kevin McCabe defended Cox as carrying out the Governor's policy priorities, while Representative Julie Coulombe pointed to Cox's role in connecting state resources to Anchorage's retail-theft, disorder and drug- interdiction efforts. Representative Andrew Gray, who opposed confirmation, said after the vote that his objection concerned Cox's fit for Alaska rather than Cox personally.

On May 14, 2026, the Legislature rejected Cox's confirmation by a vote of 29–31. Alaska Public Media reported that it was only the second time in state history that the Legislature had rejected an appointment at the commissioner level. Most Democratic and independent legislators voted against Cox.

== Counsel to the Governor ==
Minutes after the confirmation vote, Dunleavy appointed Cox Counsel to the Governor and elevated his Deputy Attorney General Cori Mills to serve as acting attorney general. The Governor's Office said Cox would advise the governor on legal, regulatory and constitutional matters and would continue working directly with the Department of Law and other executive agencies on policy initiatives, legislation, and executive actions. Mills assumed management of the Department’s day-to-day activities as acting attorney general.

Blogger Dermot Cole, a frequent critic of Cox during the confirmation process, characterized the arrangement differently. On the day of the confirmation vote, Cole wrote that he believed Dunleavy intended Cox to continue as a “shadow attorney general” who would instruct Mills “about what to do.” Cole continued to refer to Cox as a “shadow attorney general” in subsequent posts concerning Cox’s involvement in Department of Law matters.

In June 2026, appearing before the Congressional-Executive Commission on China in his new capacity, Cox said he was continuing the Counter-China work he had begun as attorney general. The Commission introduced him as Counsel to the Governor and described his Alaska work as including public safety, consumer protection and risks associated with the People's Republic of China.

Cox also participated in a White House roundtable concerning fraud with the Vice President and state attorneys general. Cox publicly described his participation in the meeting on social media.

The Department subsequently continued several initiatives that had begun during Cox’s tenure, including multistate amicus litigation. On the consumer-protection front, for example, Alaska joined the Federal Trade Commission and the states of Texas, Iowa and Nebraska in suing the World Professional Association for Transgender Health, alleging deceptive representations relating to gender-related medical treatment for minors.

In July 2026, the Municipality of Anchorage announced a $191 million settlement ending long- running Port of Alaska litigation involving the federal government. Alaska News Source reported that Mayor Suzanne LaFrance described it as the largest settlement in the city’s history.

Legal offices
Preceded by Treg Taylor	Attorney General of Alaska; Acting; 2025–2026	Succeeded by Cori Mills; Acting
