= Kevin Clarkson =

American attorney

Kevin G. Clarkson
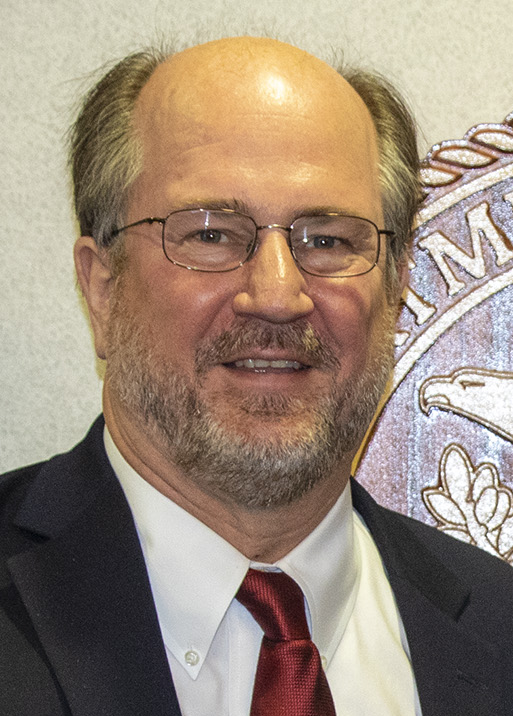

32nd Attorney General of Alaska
- In office December 5, 2018 – August 25, 2020
- Governor: Mike Dunleavy
- Preceded by: Jahna Lindemuth
- Succeeded by: Ed Sniffen (acting)

Personal details
- Born: April 27, 1959 (age 67)
- Party: Republican
- Education: Oregon State University (BA); Willamette University (JD)

Kevin G. Clarkson (born April 27, 1959) is an American attorney from the state of Alaska who was the 32nd Alaska Attorney General from 2018 to 2020.

== Early life and career ==
After earning a Bachelor of Arts degree from Oregon State University, Clarkson graduated cum laude from the Willamette University College of Law in 1985. He worked for the law firm Perkins Coie from 1985 to 1995 and for Brena, Bell & Clarkson, P.C. from 1985 to 2018.

During his career, Clarkson applied several times to fill judicial vacancies, including a 2016 bid for Alaska Supreme Court. Upon review by the Alaska Judicial Council, Clarkson often received the lowest overall rankings in surveys from attorneys who had direct experience with him. In 2016, his score indicated “insufficient qualifications for this position.”

== Alaska Attorney General ==
Governor Mike Dunleavy appointed him as Alaska's attorney general on December 5, 2018. He was confirmed by the Alaska Legislature on April 17, 2019.

=== Texting and Resignation ===
In August 2020, Clarkson was placed on administrative leave by the Alaska State Human Resources Department, with Ed Sniffen being delegated his authority. According to investigations by media organizations, a junior state employee had complained about 558 text messages Clarkson had sent to her during March 2020. In the text messages, he had asked the woman to come to his house at least 18 times. Many of these requests were punctuated with the kiss emoji and comments about the woman's beauty. He resigned from his post on August 25, 2020. Deputy Attorney General Ed Sniffen served as acting Attorney General, pending Dunleavy's selection of a permanent replacement. Ed Sniffen resigned after allegations of him having an affair with a 17-year-old in 1991. Treg Taylor was then appointed.

Legal offices
Preceded by Jahna Lindemuth	Attorney General of Alaska; 2018–2020	Succeeded by Ed Sniffen; Acting
