= Edgar Paul Boyko =

American politician

Edgar Paul Boyko (October 19, 1918 – January 1, 2002) was an Austrian-born Alaskan attorney. He served as Attorney General for the State of Alaska under the administration of Governor Walter Hickel from 1967 to 1968.

== Biography ==
Edgar Boyko was born in Vienna, Austria, on October 19, 1918, to Myron David, an eye doctor, and Florence Boyko, an opera singer. He attended the University of Vienna, but after the German annexation of Austria in 1938, he moved to Scotland. Boyko completed a degree in chemistry at St. Andrews University where he married his high school girlfriend Blanka Kohn. In 1939, the couple emigrated to the United States, where Boyko worked several jobs before receiving a law degree from the University of Maryland in 1945.

Boyko moved to Alaska in 1952 to work as an attorney for the Bureau of Land Management. The next year, he entered private practice, eventually practicing law in both Alaska and California. He became known for mounting daring defenses in difficult cases, as well as for his theatrical and idiosyncratic style. Boyko said a trial should be a performance for the jury. He wore a pinstripe suit, a vest and gold jewelry, and in later years added a cane. He was known to use astrology in the process of jury selection.

In 1956, Boyko defended Jack Marler, a former Internal Revenue Service agent accused of tax evasion. Despite a prosecution by later-Senator Ted Stevens, Marler was acquitted on a defense of "no taxation without representation", with Boyko citing the Territory of Alaska's lack of representation in the U.S. Congress.

Boyko was appointed Attorney General for Alaska during the first administration of Governor Walter J. Hickel, from 1967 to 1968. Boyko helped to form the Governor's Task Force on Native Land Claims which led to the passage of the Alaska Native Claims Settlement Act in 1971

Back in private practice, Boyko's clients included Wesley Ladd (brought into the Boyko office by Boyko associate Robert T. Stange who was at one point called as a prosecution witness), accused in the 1972 murder of Ferris Rezk. Ladd was acquitted despite eyewitness testimony but later charged with the 1973 murder of Johnny Rich, who had testified for the prosecution in the Rezk case. When Ladd called Boyko/Stange to represent him in the Rich case, Boyko responded, "Sorry, only one miracle per customer."

Boyko wrote a newspaper column and hosted a radio talk show, both called The Roar of the Snow Tiger, which offered his political views and commentary. Boyko was a lifelong Democrat, but in 1990 he joined the Alaskan Independence Party (AIP) to assist former governor Walter Hickel in taking over AIP's spot on the ballot and winning the governorship.

After suffering a series of strokes in 1998, Boyko moved to the Seattle area in 1999. He died January 1, 2002, in a Des Moines, Washington hospital.

Legal offices
Preceded by Donald A. Burr	Attorney General of Alaska; 1967–1968	Succeeded by G. Kent Edwards
