= Craig W. Richards =

American lawyer

Craig Richards
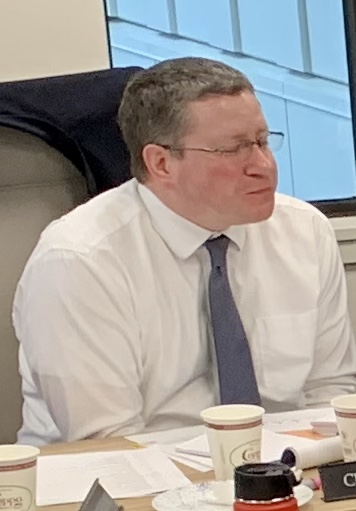

30th Attorney General of Alaska
- In office December 1, 2014 – June 23, 2016
- Governor: Bill Walker
- Preceded by: Michael Geraghty
- Succeeded by: Jim Clark (Acting)

Personal details
- Born: 1975 (age 50–51) Marietta, Georgia, U.S.
- Party: Republican
- Children: 1 son
- Education: University of Virginia (BS); Duke University (MBA); Washington and Lee University (JD)

Craig W. Richards (born 1975) was the Attorney General of Alaska. He was nominated for the position by his former law partner, Governor Bill Walker in December 2014.

Richards was born in Fairbanks, Alaska. He received a degree in finance from the University of Virginia and an MBA from Duke University. He received his JD from Washington and Lee University School of Law. He clerked for United States District Court judge Ralph Beistline. Richards was an associate at the law firm Wohlforth, Vassar, Johnson & Brecht in Anchorage before joining the firm that later became Walker Richards with Bill Walker. He is experienced with oil and gas and taxation and represented municipalities in litigation over the assessment of the Trans-Alaska Pipeline System. Walker Richards represented the city of Valdez and secured over $1B in tax revenue for municipalities and the State of Alaska.

Richards was nominated for Attorney General of Alaska by Walker in December 2014. Richards announced his resignation as Attorney General on June 23, 2016, with the resignation effective immediately. Governor Bill Walker accepted his resignation, and thanked Richards for his service to the State of Alaska.

Legal offices
Preceded by Michael Geraghty	Attorney General of Alaska; 2014–2016	Succeeded by Jim Clark; Acting
