= Michael Geraghty =

American lawyer

29th Attorney General of Alaska
- In office April 10, 2012 – December 2, 2014
- Governor: Sean Parnell
- Preceded by: John Burns
- Succeeded by: Craig W. Richards

Personal details
- Born: Michael C. Geraghty; July 21, 1952 (age 74) Fairbanks, Alaska
- Party: Republican
- Spouse: Mishel Geraghty
- Children: Five
- Relatives: Jim Matherly (nephew)
- Education: University of Hawaii (B.A.); Santa Clara University School of Law (J.D.)
- Occupation: Lawyer

Michael C. Geraghty (born July 21, 1952) is an American lawyer who served as the attorney general of Alaska from 2012 until 2014. He was nominated for this position by Governor Sean Parnell, confirmed by the Alaska Senate and sworn in on April 10, 2012.

Prior to his appointment as AG, Geraghty was a lawyer in private practice. Geraghty is also a commissioner with the National Conference of Commissioners on Uniform State Laws.

Geraghty was born in Fairbanks, Alaska. He received his undergraduate degree in political science from the University of Hawaii in 1974 and his J.D. from the Santa Clara University School of Law in 1978. He is married with five children and lives in Anchorage, Alaska.

Political offices
Preceded by John J. Burns	Attorney General of Alaska; 2012–2014	Succeeded by Michael C. Geraghty
