= John Rustgard =

American politician from Alaska (1863–1950)

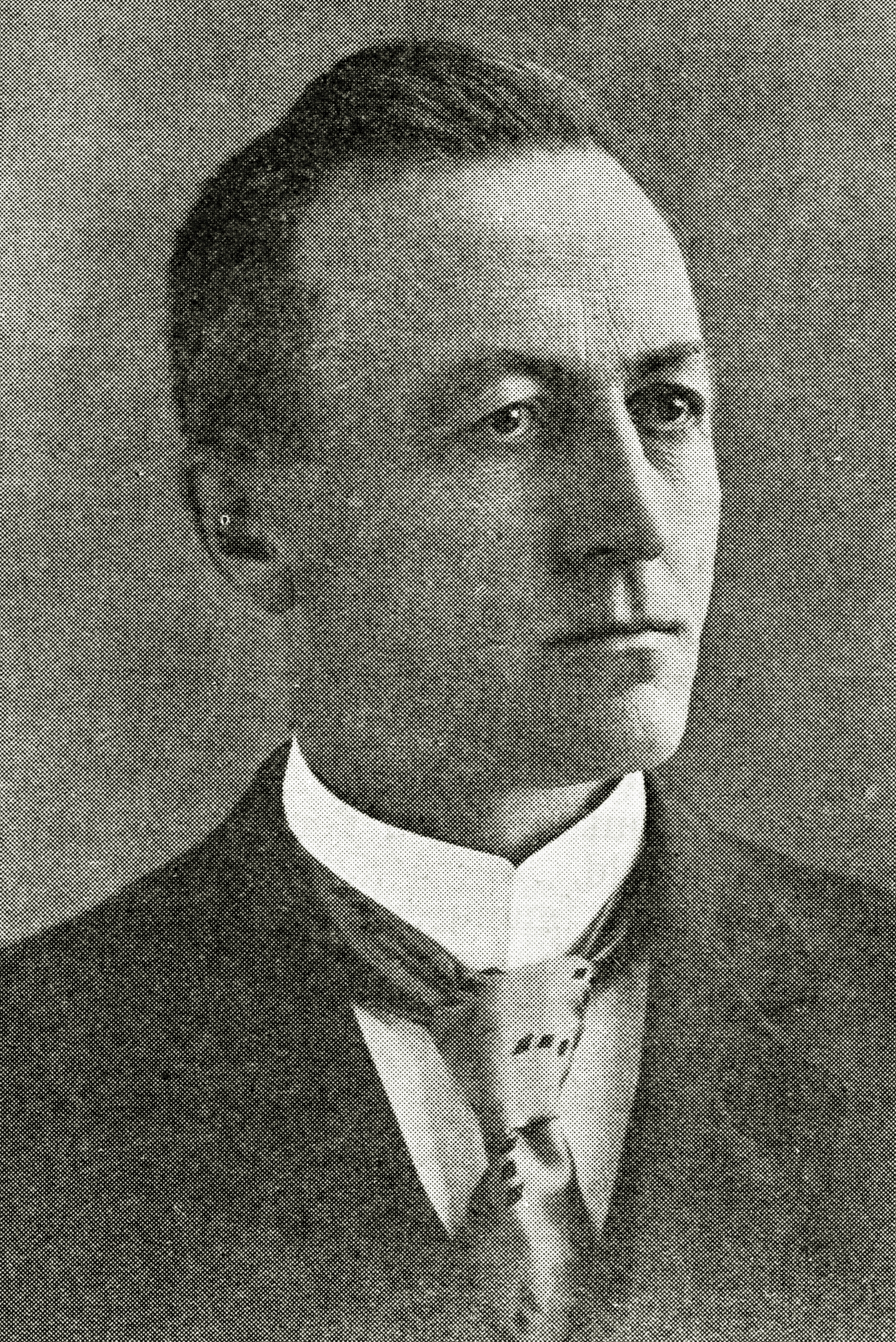

3rd Attorney General of the Alaska Territory
- In office 1920–1933
- Governor: Thomas Riggs Jr. Scott Cordelle Bone; George Alexander Parks
- Preceded by: Jeremiah C. Murphy
- Succeeded by: James S. Truitt

Mayor of Nome
- In office April 27, 1902 – May 23, 1904
- Preceded by: W. H. Bard
- Succeeded by: H. P. King

Nome City Attorney
- In office 1900–1909

U.S. District Attorney in the First Judicial Division
- In office 1910–1914

Personal details
- Born: 1863 Beitstad, Norway
- Died: February 12, 1950 (aged 86–87) Babson Park, Florida, U.S.
- Political party: Republican
- Education: University of Minnesota

John Rustgard (October 21, 1863 – February 12, 1950) was a Norwegian-American lawyer and politician who served as the 3rd Attorney General of the Alaska Territory as a member of the Republican party from 1920 to 1933. He remains the longest serving attorney general of Alaska to date.

== Early life ==
John Rustgard was born in Beitstad, Norway in 1863. He left Norway as a cabin boy on a clipper ship, and ended up settling in Minnesota. Rustgard attended school in Red Wing, Minnesota and earned a law degree from the University of Minnesota in 1890. Afterward, Rustgard worked in Minneapolis as a schoolteacher from 1890 to 1892 before practicing law from 1892 to 1900. He married Alice Jane Adeane in 1902 and stayed with her until her death in 1924 before remarrying with Josephine Michaelson.

== Political career ==
John Rustgard moved to Nome, Alaska in 1900, where he practiced law and became the City attorney for Nome for two terms until 1908. He also served a single term as Mayor of Nome from 1902 to 1904. Rustgard moved to Juneau in 1908 and served as the U.S. District Attorney in the First Judicial Division from 1910 to 1914 before returning to practice private law. In 1920, Rustgard was elected as the 3rd Attorney General of the Alaska Territory, a position to which he would get re-elected twice and serve until 1933 under three different Governors. Rustgard also ran in the Republican Primary for the office of Delegate to the U.S. House of Representatives from Alaska Territory's at-large district, but lost to James Wickersham. During his time in Alaska, Rustgard also became a miner on the Seward Peninsula.

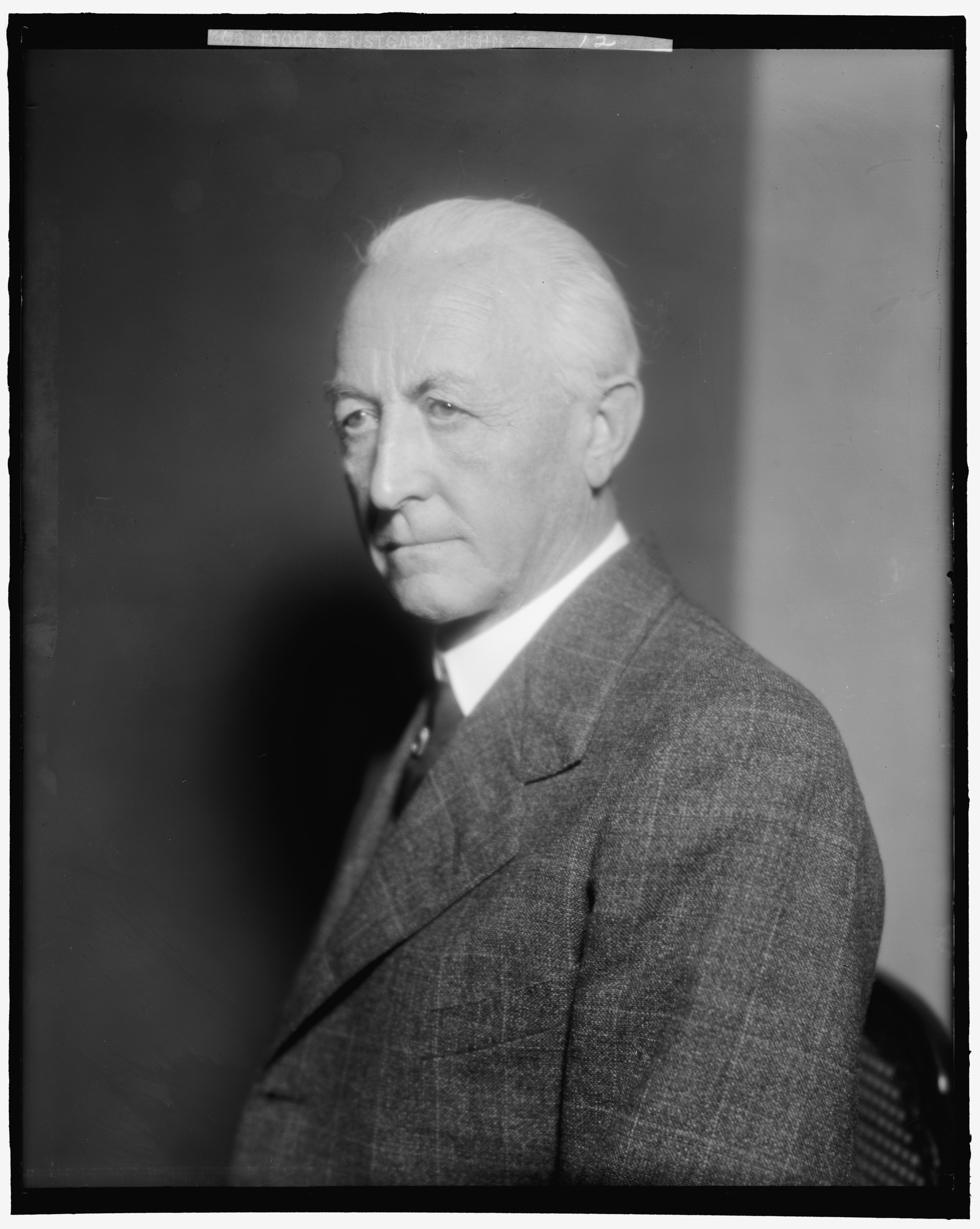
John Rustgard in 1905.

== Later life and death ==
Following the end of his term as state Attorney General in 1933, Rustgard spent 18 months in Europe before retiring to Babson Park, Florida in 1936. Rustgard wrote a number of books, including: The problem of poverty (1936), Sharing the wealth (1937) and The bankruptcy of liberalism (1942). He also spent a great amount of time on the subject of sociology. Rustgard died at his home, Villa Sorgenfri, in Babson Park, Florida on February 12, 1950, he lies buried at Oaklawn Cemetery in Winter Haven, Florida.

Political offices
| Preceded by W. H. Bard | Mayor of Nome; 1902-1904 | Succeeded by H. P. King |
| Preceded by Jeremiah C. Murphy | Attorney General of the Alaska Territory; 1920-1933 | Succeeded by James S. Truitt |
