= Treg Taylor =

American attorney and former Attorney General of Alaska (born 1976)

33rd Attorney General of Alaska
- In office January 30, 2021 – August 29, 2025; Acting: January 30, 2021 – May 11, 2021
- Governor: Mike Dunleavy
- Preceded by: Ed Sniffen (acting)
- Succeeded by: Stephen J. Cox (acting)

Personal details
- Born: Tregarrick Taylor; May 19, 1976 (age 50)
- Party: Republican
- Spouse: Jodi Taylor
- Children: 6
- Education: Brigham Young University (BA, JD)
- Website: Campaign website

Tregarrick R. "Treg" Taylor (born May 19, 1976) is an American lawyer who was the Alaska attorney general from 2021 to 2025. He succeeded Ed Sniffen, who resigned after being appointed to the position two weeks before. Taylor is a candidate in the 2026 Alaska gubernatorial election. He was disqualified due to failure to comply with financial disclosure requirements, but this was later reversed.

== Education ==
Taylor briefly attended the United States Air Force Academy. He graduated from Brigham Young University (BYU) in 2001 with a Bachelor of Arts degree in political science and from BYU's J. Reuben Clark Law School in 2004 with a Juris Doctor.

== Career ==
In 2016, Taylor was an unsuccessful candidate for a seat in the Anchorage Municipal Assembly. Taylor has served as the deputy attorney general of Alaska for the civil division. Taylor assumed office as Alaska attorney general in an acting capacity January 30, 2021. He was confirmed to the position by the Alaska Legislature on May 11, 2021.

Taylor supported the Pebble Mine proposal and expressed opposition to the federal government's decision to block the project.

During Taylor’s tenure as attorney general, Alaska’s overall crime rate reached a forty-year low, according to the Alaska Department of Public Safety. State officials attributed the decline in part to coordinated efforts between the Department of Law, state troopers, and local prosecutors to strengthen case management and improve victim support services. Reported sexual assault rates declined by roughly twenty percent during the same period, continuing a trend that had begun in the early 2020s.

Taylor also helped secure more than $100 million in opioid settlement funds from major pharmaceutical distributors and manufacturers. The money was designated for addiction recovery, prevention, and rehabilitation programs across Alaska. Under Taylor’s direction, the Department of Law worked with the Alaska Mental Health Trust Authority and state health agencies to oversee the distribution of settlement funds to local treatment providers.

Throughout his tenure, Taylor pursued litigation against the Biden administration. He filed or joined lawsuits opposing several federal initiatives, including new restrictions on oil and gas development on federal lands, a COVID-19 vaccine mandate for federal contractors, and revisions to Title IX regulations expanding protections for transgender students and athletes. In each case, Taylor argued that the federal government had exceeded its authority and infringed on state sovereignty.

Taylor also represented Alaska’s government in several environmental and natural resource cases. He defended the state’s position in litigation concerning the Willow Project, a large-scale oil development in the National Petroleum Reserve Alaska, and that Alaska had jurisdiction over fisheries management within the state.

=== 2026 gubernatorial campaign ===
Taylor announced his campaign for Governor of Alaska on September 16, 2025, after resigning as Attorney General on August 29. He spent heavily on his own campaign during the primary, but appeared to violate Alaska campaign finance law by exceeding a legal limit on donations to one's one campaign in the month before an election. Taylor argued that the regulation was unconstitutional, but did not challenge it in court.

Taylor placed fifth in the nonpartisan primary with 7.3% of the vote, putting him in a position to advance to the general election following the withdrawal of Democratic candidate Tom Begich. However, the Alaska Public Offices Commission (APOC) recommended against certifying Taylor's candidacy after he failed to properly list the full names of his tenants in financial disclosures despite months of requests to do so. Alaska lieutenant governor Nancy Dahlstrom subsequently announced on August 31 she would follow the recommendation and refuse to certify Taylor's candidacy, disqualifying him from the race. This decision would elevate Taylor's running mate—businesswoman Candice English—to gubernatorial candidate, provided she named a running mate of her own.

English named Taylor's wife, Jodi, as her running mate for the general election. Jodi Taylor—a co-owner of properties with her husband—also failed to provide the full names of their tenants on her financial disclosures.

On September 4, Dahlstrom reversed course and announced that she would certify Treg Taylor to appear on the general election ballot. Dahlstrom cited an analysis from the Alaska Department of Law and concerns of selective scrutiny and enforcement by APOC.

On October 6, Taylor agreed to pay a $1,087.50 fine to APOC to settle a separate complaint regarding his failure to provide sufficient detail about payments to consulting businesses.

== Personal life ==
Before his appointment as attorney general by Governor Mike Dunleavy, Taylor practiced private law in Anchorage.

Taylor and his wife, Jodi, have six children and live in Anchorage.

Legal offices
Preceded by Ed Sniffen; Acting	Attorney General of Alaska; 2021–2025	Succeeded by Stephen J. Cox; Acting
