= Bill Walker (American politician) =

American attorney and politician (born 1951)

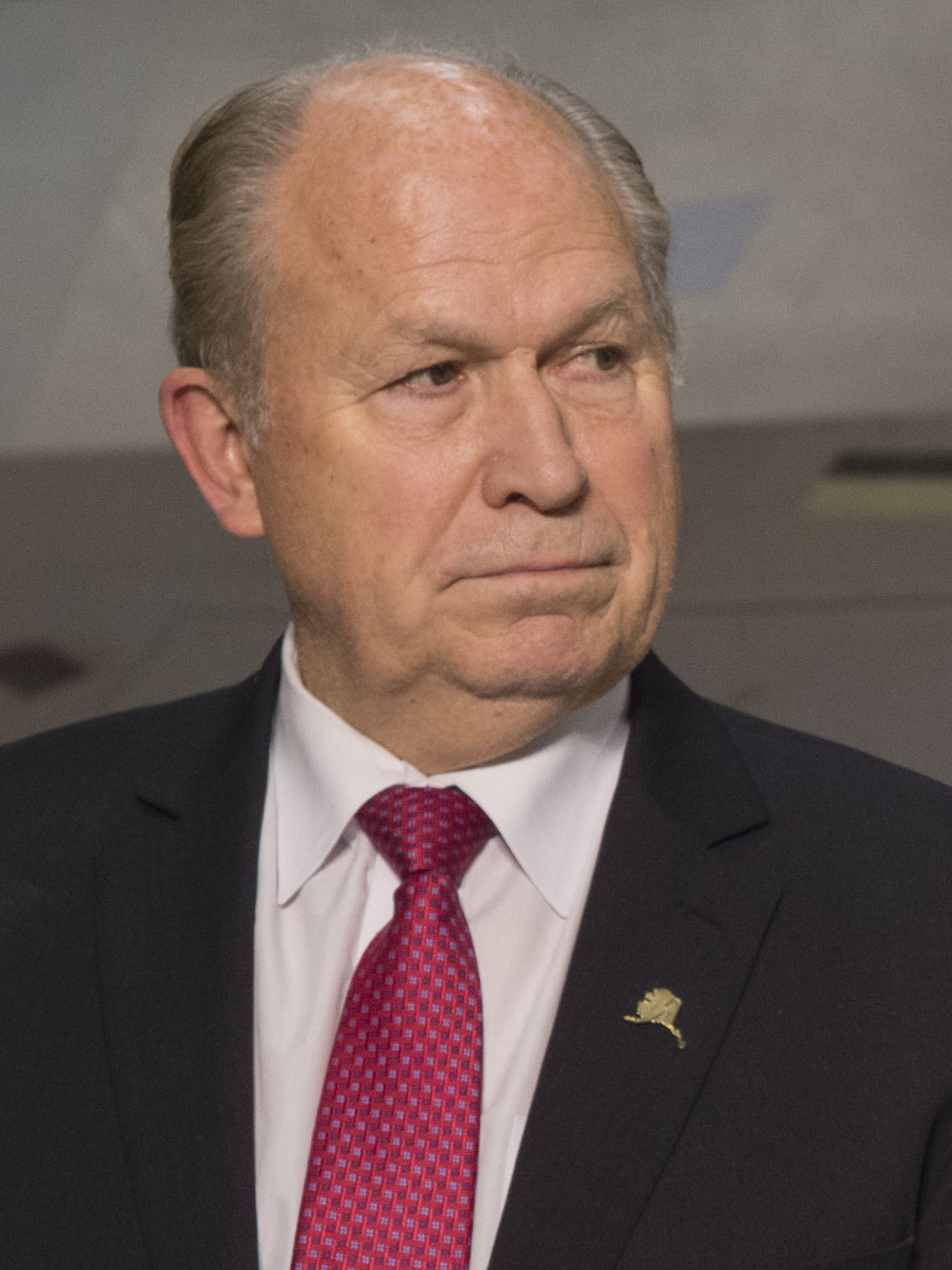
- Walker in 2018

11th Governor of Alaska
- In office December 1, 2014 – December 3, 2018
- Lieutenant: Byron Mallott; Valerie Davidson
- Preceded by: Sean Parnell
- Succeeded by: Mike Dunleavy

Mayor of Valdez
- In office 1979–1980
- Preceded by: Mac MacDonald
- Succeeded by: Stephen McAlpine

Personal details
- Born: William Martin Walker; April 16, 1951 (age 75) Fairbanks, Alaska Territory, U.S.
- Party: Republican (before 2014); Independent (2014–present)
- Spouse: Donna Walker
- Children: 4
- Education: Lewis and Clark College (BS); Seattle University (JD)

William Martin Walker (born April 16, 1951) is an American attorney and politician who served as the 11th governor of Alaska, from 2014 to 2018. He was the second Alaska-born governor, after William A. Egan.

Walker was born in Fairbanks to Frances (Park) and businessman Ed Walker; he was raised in Delta Junction and Valdez, Alaska. He obtained a J.D. degree from Seattle University and served as mayor, city councilor, and city attorney for Valdez, and as general counsel for the Alaska Gasline Port Authority. Walker ran for governor of Alaska in the Republican Party primary election in 2010, losing to incumbent Sean Parnell.

Walker ran as an independent in the 2014 election, merging his campaign with that of Democratic nominee Byron Mallott, who became Walker's running mate. Both candidates' prior respective running mates withdrew from the race and the Walker/Mallott ticket defeated Parnell and his running mate, former Anchorage mayor Dan Sullivan. Walker ran for reelection in 2018, but facing low polling numbers and Lieutenant Governor Mallott's resignation, he dropped out of the race on October 19, 2018, and endorsed Democrat Mark Begich. Walker ran in the 2022 election as an independent, but finished in third behind Republican incumbent Mike Dunleavy and Democratic candidate Les Gara. He ran again in the 2026 election, but placed ninth in the primary election and did not advance to the general election.

== Early life and education ==
Walker was born in Fairbanks, Alaska, and raised in the small, rural interior city of Delta Junction and the port of Valdez on Prince William Sound. He was the fourth child of Alaskan pioneers Frances (Park) and Ed Walker. During World War II, Ed was an Alaskan Scout with Castner's Cutthroats in the Aleutian Islands and Frances worked on the Alaska-Canadian Highway. During the 1964 Alaska earthquake, which severely damaged Valdez, the family lost most of their personal and business possessions. At the age of 12, Walker became a janitor to help his family.

Walker graduated from Valdez High School in 1969. He received his B.S. in business management from Lewis & Clark College in 1973 and his J.D. from the University of Puget Sound School of Law (now Seattle University School of Law) in 1983. Walker worked in his family's construction business as a carpenter, laborer, and teamster on the Trans-Alaska Pipeline, which helped him pay for his education.

== Career ==
From 1977 to 1979, Walker served on the Valdez city council. He later was elected mayor of Valdez, serving from 1979 through 1980. At 27, he was Valdez's youngest mayor.

Walker and his wife, Donna, owned a law firm; he became a prominent oil and gas attorney. The firm represented the city of Valdez and the Alaska Gasline Port Authority. Walker "represented the city of Valdez in lawsuits that charged [oil] companies with lowballing the property tax valuation of the industry-owned Trans-Alaska pipeline system". He also attempted to build a gas pipeline in Alaska.

== Governor of Alaska (2014–2018) ==
=== Elections ===
==== 2010 ====
Walker challenged incumbent governor Sean Parnell as well as Gerald L. Heikes, Merica Hlatcu, Sam Little, and Ralph Samuels in the Republican Party primary election on August 24, 2010. Walker finished second, with 33.95% of the vote, while Parnell won the nomination with 49.49%. The general election was held on November 2, 2010 and Parnell defeated his Democratic opponent, Ethan Berkowitz.

==== 2014 ====
In 2013, Walker announced his intention to run in the 2014 gubernatorial election as a Republican. Later that year, he decided to run as a nonpartisan candidate instead, taking the advice and encouragement he had received prior to his 2010 campaign from former Alaska governor Wally Hickel.

Walker selected Craig Fleener, a former Deputy Commissioner of the Alaska Department of Fish and Game, to run for lieutenant governor on his ticket. He campaigned on a centrist platform, mixing traditionally conservative and liberal positions. Walker opposed the construction of the Pebble Mine and acknowledged the existence of climate change and the need to adopt energy policies to help mitigate its harmful effects, but supported increasing oil and gas pipeline capacities and new drilling for petroleum in the Arctic National Wildlife Refuge. He also supported gun rights, a degree of state sovereignty for Alaska, and the Medicaid expansion made possible by the Affordable Care Act.

On September 2, 2014, Walker held a press conference with Byron Mallott, the Democratic nominee for governor, announcing that they would merge their campaigns, with Mallott replacing Fleener as Walker's running mate. Mallott's Democratic running mate, attorney and State Senator Hollis French, also stepped aside, leaving no official Democratic candidate in the election. Before their announcement the merger was met with resistance from the Alaska Republican Party, but it was ruled valid by the Alaska Supreme Court.

Walker led in polls taken weeks before the November 4 general election. Parnell was widely criticized for his support of billions in unpopular tax reductions for the petrochemical industry and the development of a scandal featuring five years of alleged cover-ups of rampant sexual abuse, cronyism, corruption and whistleblower suppression in the Alaska National Guard, for which Parnell served as Commander in Chief. Following Election Day, the race was considered too close to call. On November 7, Walker and Mallott held a 3,165-vote lead. On November 14, after Walker and Mallott extended their lead to 4,634 votes, media outlets called the race. Two days later, Parnell conceded.

==== 2018 ====
Walker sought reelection in 2018. He initially ran with incumbent lieutenant governor Byron Mallott as his running mate, but after a revelation of inappropriate comments, Mallott resigned on October 16. He was replaced by State Health and Social Services Commissioner Valerie Davidson, who was sworn in the same day. Though Davidson replaced Mallott as Walker's running mate, Mallott remained on the ballot. On October 19, facing low polling numbers, Walker suspended his campaign and endorsed the Democratic candidate, Mark Begich. Begich lost by 7.03% to Republican nominee Mike Dunleavy. Despite his withdrawal, Walker received 2.03% of the vote.

==== 2022 ====
On August 17, 2021, Walker announced his candidacy in the 2022 gubernatorial election as an independent. As his running mate he named Heidi Drygas, who served as his commissioner of the Department of Labor and Workforce Development from 2014 to 2018. He lost the election to Republican incumbent Mike Dunleavy.

==== 2026 ====
Walker ran for governor again in the 2026 election with Randy Hoffbeck as his running mate. He finished with 4.5% in the blanket primary and did not advance to the general election.

=== Tenure ===
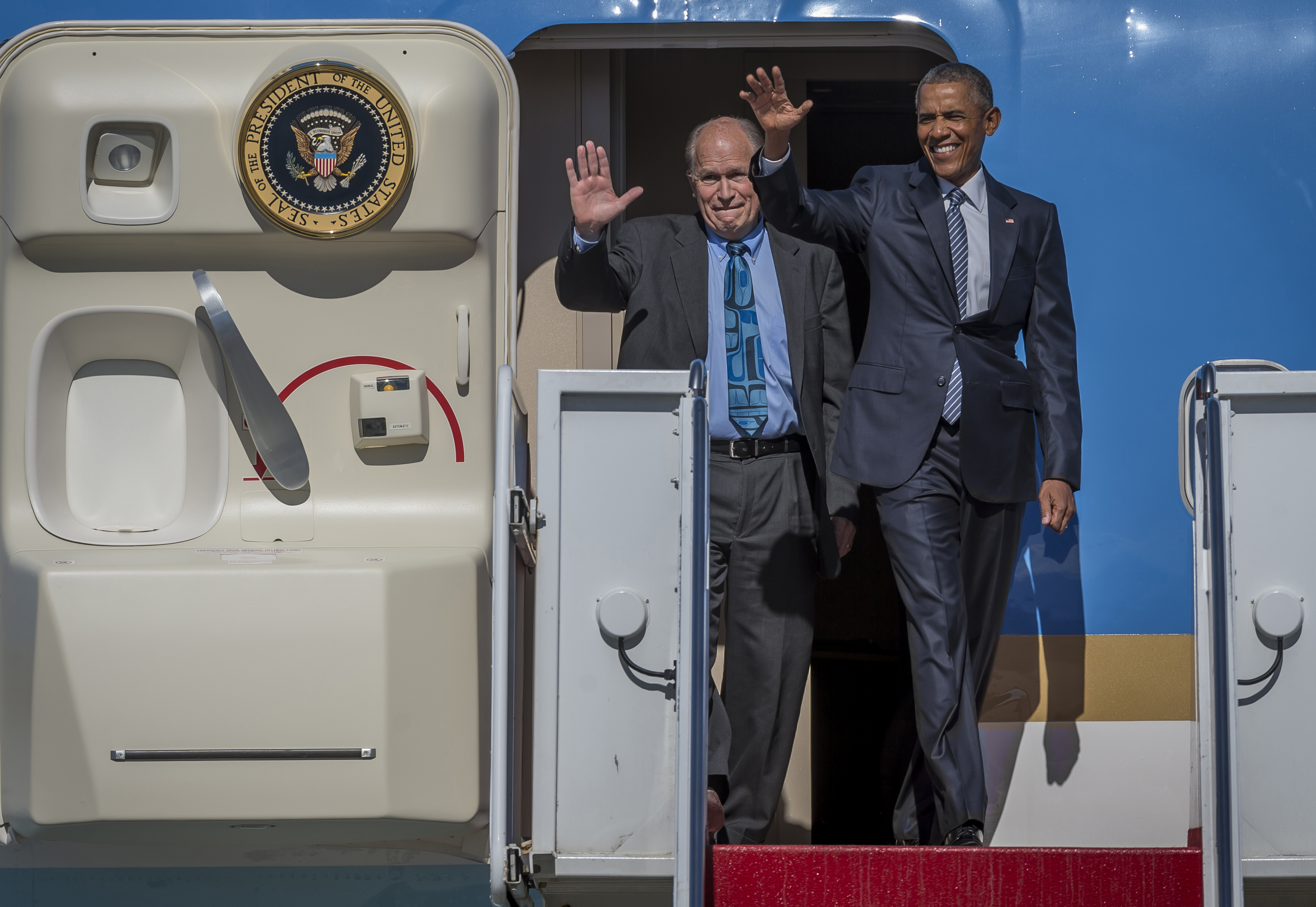
Walker with President Barack Obama in 2015

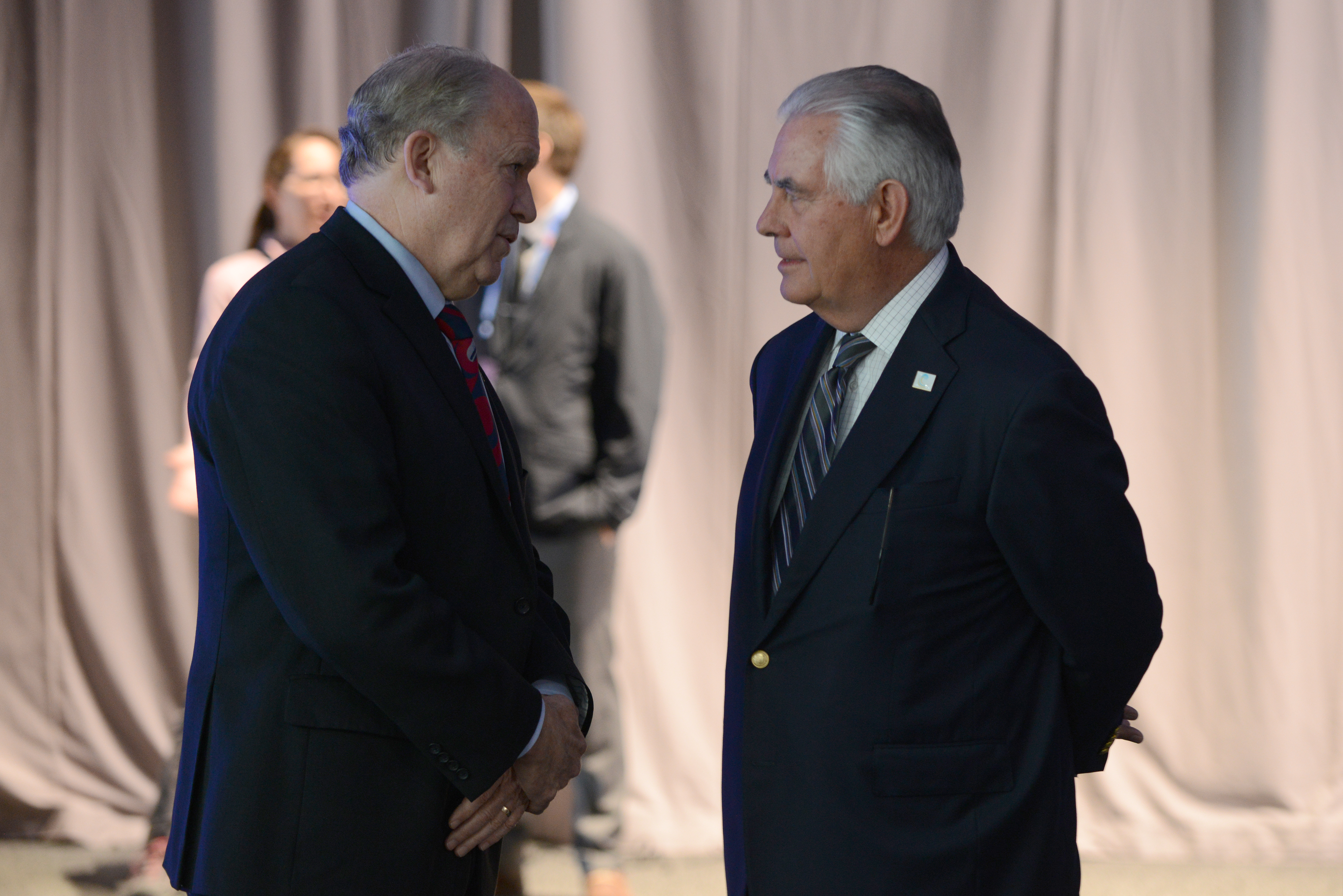
Walker and U.S. Secretary of State Rex Tillerson at the Arctic Council Ministerial Meeting, May 2017

Walker took the oath of office on December 1, 2014. He faced a Republican-controlled legislature, but the Republican majorities were not enough to override a gubernatorial veto. With the Republican legislature opposed to Walker's attempts to expand Medicaid, Walker decided to use his executive authority to do so.

In 2015, due to low oil prices, Alaska anticipated a $4 billion budget deficit. Budget cuts and raised taxes were proposed to reduce it. In December 2015, Walker proposed reinstating a statewide income tax as well as reducing annual payments to qualified state residents from the Alaska Permanent Fund. His June 2016 partial veto of legislation pertaining to the APF resulted in annual payments to state residents being cut by more than half. The New Yorker later wrote that this "deeply unpopular" move "doomed" Walker's chances of reelection.

In July 2018, Walker signed into law a legislative ethics bill. The bill prevented a stronger ballot measure, which would have prohibited foreign corporations from donating to statewide campaign candidates, from appearing on the fall ballot.

In September 2018, the office of Anchorage District Attorney Richard K. Allen entered into a controversial plea bargain in the case of a former FAA air traffic controller who allegedly kidnapped a native Alaskan woman, choked her until she passed out and then masturbated over her. In response to citizen outrage at the reduced sentence, Walker issued a statement saying that the sentence was insufficient and that he would propose legislation making unwanted contact with semen a sex crime.

Lieutenant Governor Byron Mallott resigned on October 16, 2018, citing "inappropriate comments" that he and Walker did not detail. A new lieutenant governor, Alaska Health and Social Services Commissioner Valerie Davidson, was sworn in.

== Personal life ==
Before becoming governor and moving to Juneau, Walker and his wife Donna resided in Anchorage. As of 2017, the couple had two sons, two daughters, and five grandchildren.

In November 2016, Walker announced that he had developed prostate cancer, for which he would have routine, out-patient surgery the following month.

== Electoral history ==
2010 Alaska gubernatorial Republican primary election
Party	Candidate	Votes	%
Republican	Sean Parnell (inc.)	54,125	49.49
Republican	Bill Walker	35,734	33.95
Republican	Ralph Samuels	15,376	14.05
Republican	Sam Little	1,661	1.54
Republican	Merica Hlatcu	626	0.56
Republican	Gerald L. Heikes	460	0.40
Total votes		107,982	100

2014 Alaska gubernatorial election
Party	Candidate	Votes	%	±%
Independent	Bill Walker/Byron Mallott	134,658	48.1%	+48.1%
Republican	Sean Parnell (inc.)/Dan Sullivan	128,435	45.9%	−13.22%
Libertarian	Carolyn Clift/Andrew C. Lee	8,985	3.21%	+2.16%
Constitution	J. R. Myers/Maria Rensel	6,987	2.5%	+2.5%
Write-ins	Others	893	0.32%	−0.04%
Majority		6,223	2.22%	
Turnout		279,958	55%	

2018 Alaska gubernatorial election
Party	Candidate	Votes	%	±%
Republican	Mike Dunleavy/Kevin Meyer	145,631	51.44%	+5.56%
Democratic	Mark Begich/Debra Call	125,739	44.41%	+44.41%
Independent	Bill Walker (inc.)/Byron Mallott (Note: Byron Mallott was replaced by Valerie Davidson on October 16 but Mallott remained on the ballot.)	5,757	2.03%	−46.07%
Libertarian	William Toien/Carolyn Clift	5,402	1.91%	−1.30%
Write-in		605	0.21%	−0.11%
Total votes		283,134	100.00%	N/A
Turnout		284,891	49.82%	
Registered electors		571,851		
Republican gain from Independent				

2022 Alaska gubernatorial election Top-four primary
Party	Candidate	Votes	%
Republican	Mike Dunleavy (incumbent); Nancy Dahlstrom	76,534	40.43
Democratic	Les Gara; Jessica Cook	43,660	23.06
Independent	Bill Walker; Heidi Drygas	43,111	22.77
Republican	Charlie Pierce; Edie Grunwald	12,458	6.58
Republican	Christopher Kurka; Paul Hueper	7,307	3.86
Independence	John Howe; Shellie Wyatt	1,702	0.90
Republican	Bruce Walden; Tanya Lange	1,661	0.88
Libertarian	William S. Toien; Shirley Rainbolt	1,381	0.73
Republican	David Haeg; Waynette Coleman	1,139	0.60
Independent	William Nemec; Ronnie Ostrem	347	0.18
Total votes		188,626	100.00

2022 Alaska gubernatorial election
Party	Candidate	Votes	%	±%
Republican	Mike Dunleavy (incumbent); Nancy Dahlstrom	132,632	50.29%	−1.15%
Democratic	Les Gara; Jessica Cook	63,851	24.21%	−20.20%
Independent	Bill Walker; Heidi Drygas	54,668	20.73%	+18.70%
Republican	Charlie Pierce; Edie Grunwald (withdrew) (Note: Suspended her campaign and endorsed Dunleavy on October 25, 2022 after allegations of sexual harassment against Pierce but remained on the ballot.)	11,817	4.48%	N/A
Write-in		784	0.30%	+0.09%
Total votes		263,752	100.0%	
Turnout		266,472	44.33%	−5.49%
Registered electors		601,161		
Republican hold				

2026 Alaska gubernatorial election Top-four primary
Party	Candidate	Votes	%
Democratic	Jonathan Kreiss-Tomkins Zac Johnson	37,006	22.5
Democratic	Tom Begich (withdrew) Julia Hnilicka (withdrew)	34,172	20.8
Republican	Bernadette Wilson Mike Shower	16,468	10.0
Republican	Dave Bronson Josh Church	13,364	8.1
Republican	Treg Taylor Candice English	11,928	7.3
Republican	Click Bishop (withdrew) Greta Schuerch (withdrew)	11,527	7.0
Republican	Adam Crum Robert Craig	8,922	5.4
Republican	Shelley Hughes Blake Gettys	8,776	5.4
Independent	Bill Walker Randy Hoffbeck	7,341	4.5
Republican	Matt Heilala Jesse Sumner (withdrew)	4,330	2.6
Independent	Meda DeWitt Christopher Steere	4,184	2.5
Republican	Edna DeVries George Hightower	2,167	1.3
Republican	Lesil McGuire Elizabeth Rexford	2,098	1.3
Republican	Michael Loren Gilbert Timothy Hickel	675	0.4
Republican	James W. "JP4" Parkin Ramadhani "Ram" Greer	638	0.4
Independent	Destry J. Payne Sr. Cliff Silvers	372	0.2
Republican	Henry R. "Hank" Kroll Tommy R. Nicholson III	335	0.2
Total votes		164,303	100.0

== See also ==
- List of mayors of Valdez, Alaska

== Notes ==
Footnotes

Party political offices
Preceded by Byron Mallott; Withdrew	Democratic nominee for Governor of Alaska; Endorsed; 2014	Succeeded by Mark Begich
Political offices
Preceded by Sean Parnell	Governor of Alaska; 2014–2018	Succeeded by Mike Dunleavy
U.S. order of precedence (ceremonial)
Preceded by Sean Parnell as Former Governor	Order of precedence of the United States; Within Alaska	Succeeded by Jack Markell as Former Governor
Preceded by Sean Parnell as Former Governor	Order of precedence of the United States; Outside Alaska	Succeeded by John Waiheʻe as Former Governor
