= Mike Dunleavy (politician) =

Governor of Alaska since 2018

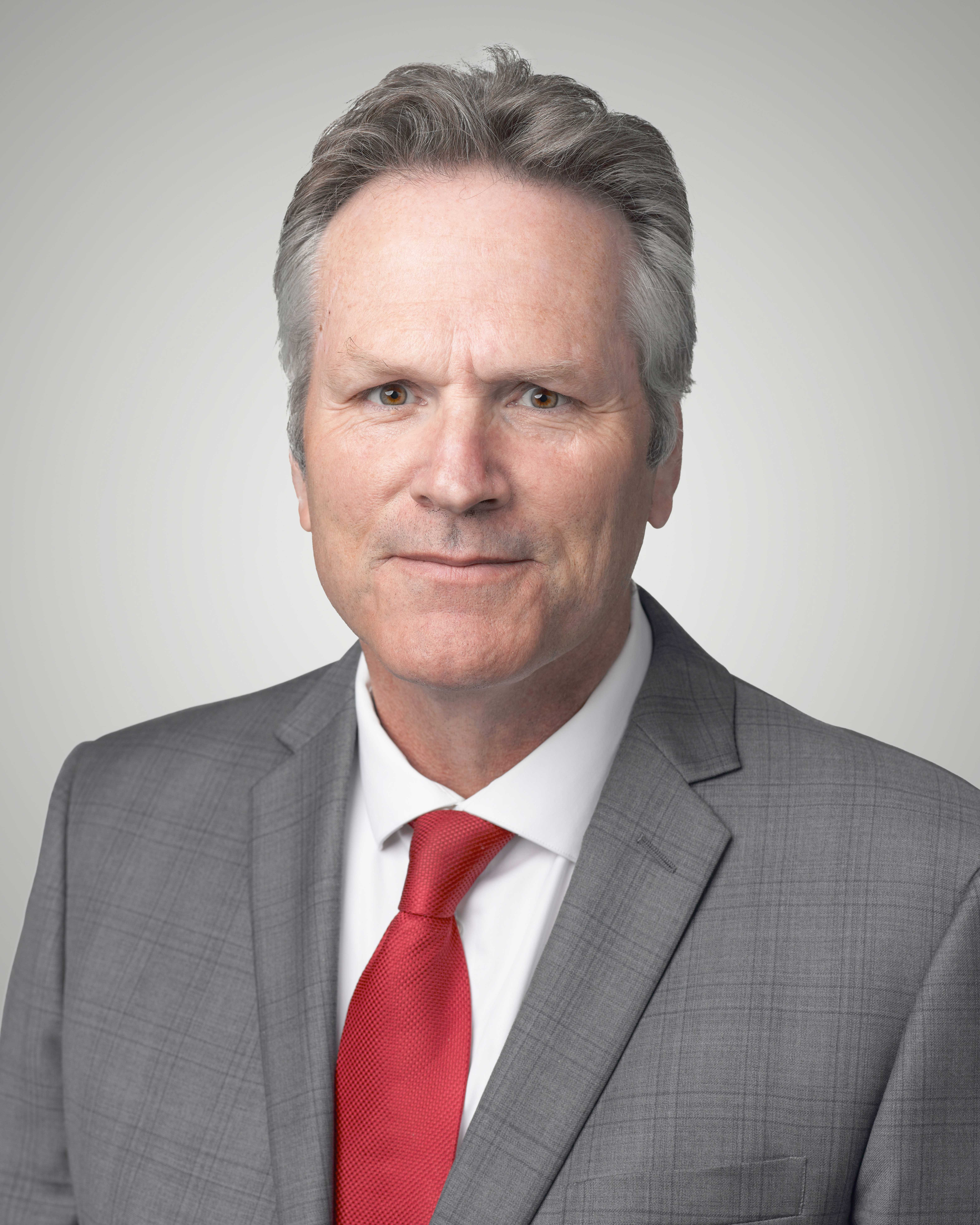
- Official portrait, 2022

12th Governor of Alaska
- Incumbent
- Assumed office December 3, 2018
- Lieutenant: Kevin Meyer; Nancy Dahlstrom
- Preceded by: Bill Walker

Member of the Alaska State Senate
- In office January 15, 2013 – January 15, 2018
- Preceded by: Linda Menard
- Succeeded by: Mike Shower
- Constituency: D district (2013–2015); E district (2015–2018)

Personal details
- Born: Michael James Dunleavy; May 5, 1961 (age 65) Scranton, Pennsylvania, U.S.
- Party: Republican
- Spouse: Rose Newlin
- Children: 3
- Education: Misericordia University (BA); University of Alaska Fairbanks (MEd)
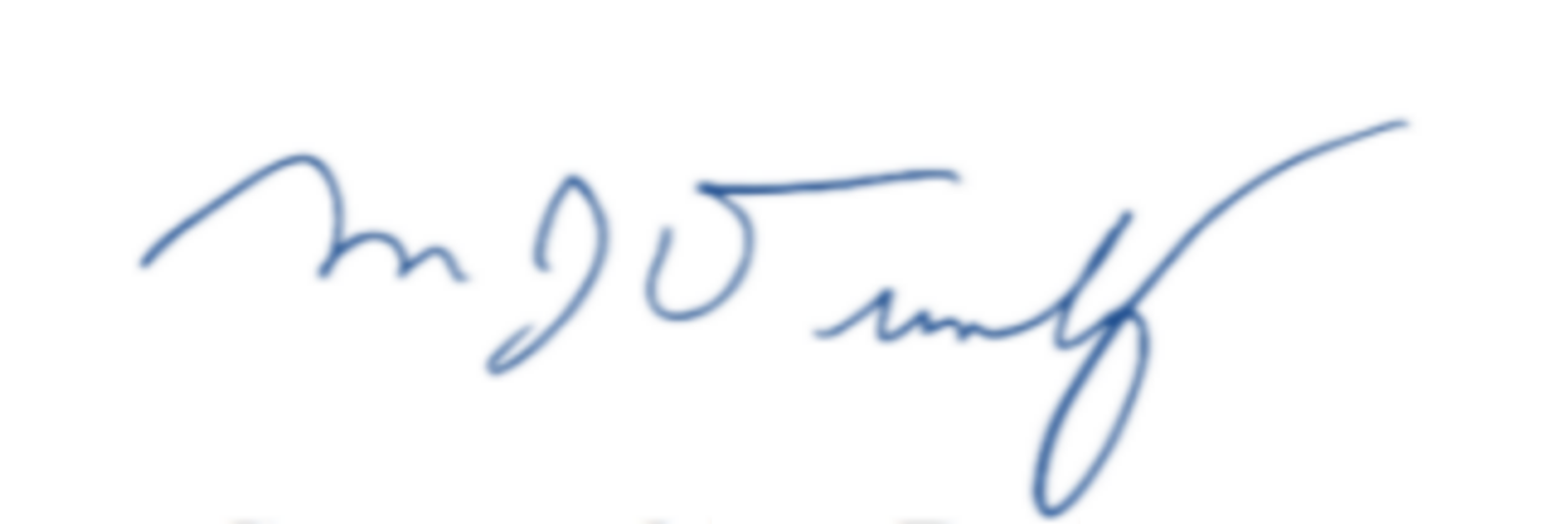
- Signature
- Website: Office website
- Dunleavy's voice Dunleavy on telehealth deregulation Recorded July 16, 2020

Michael James Dunleavy (born May 5, 1961) is an American politician and educator serving since 2018 as the 12th governor of Alaska. A member of the Republican Party, he served from 2013 to 2018 as a member of the Alaska Senate. He defeated former U.S. senator Mark Begich in the 2018 gubernatorial election after incumbent governor Bill Walker dropped out of the race, and was reelected in 2022.

In 2024, Dunleavy was elected chairman of the Interstate Oil and Gas Compact Commission.

In 2026, President Donald Trump appointed Dunleavy to a seat on the United States Arctic Research Commission.

== Early life, education, and teaching career ==
Dunleavy was born and raised in Scranton, Pennsylvania. After graduating from Scranton Central High School in 1979, he earned a Bachelor of Arts in history at Misericordia University in 1983. In 1983, he moved to Alaska and his first job was at a logging camp in Southeast Alaska. Later, Dunleavy earned his master's degree in education from the University of Alaska Fairbanks. He spent nearly two decades in northwest Arctic communities working as a teacher, principal, and superintendent. Dunleavy's wife, Rose, is from the Kobuk River Valley community of Noorvik. They have three children, who were raised in both rural and urban Alaska. In 2004, Dunleavy and his family moved to Wasilla, where he owned an educational consulting firm and worked on a number of statewide educational projects. Before his election to the Alaska Senate, Dunleavy served on the board of the Matanuska-Susitna Borough School District, including two years as its president.

== State legislative career ==
Dunleavy defeated incumbent state senator Linda Menard (redistricted from District G) in the District D August 28, 2012, Republican primary with 2,802 votes (57.42%). He was unopposed in the November 6 general election and won with 11,724 votes (94.24%) against write-in candidates.

Dunleavy represented District D from 2013 to 2014, before redistricting placed him in District E, where he continued to serve until resigning in January 2018 to run for governor.

Dunleavy held various committee positions during his first term. He served as chair of the Senate Labor & Commerce Committee, co-chair of the Trans-Alaska Pipeline System (TAPS) Throughput Special Committee, vice-chair of the Senate Education Committee, the Senate Finance Committee, and a member of the Legislative Council.

Dunleavy also chaired the Senate Environmental Conservation Finance Subcommittee and the Fish & Game Finance Subcommittee, and served on Legislative Budget & Audit and World Trade committees in his first term.

As co‑chair of the Trans‑Alaska Pipeline System (TAPS) Throughput Special Committee, Dunleavy oversaw hearings on oil and gas bills such as SB 21 (a ConocoPhillips-supported oil tax credit bill).

In 2014, Dunleavy ran unopposed in the Republican primary election on August 19. He defeated Democratic nominee Warren Keogh in the November general election with 64.65% of the vote.

During his second term, Dunleavy chaired the Education Committee and was a member of the Finance Committee and the Special Committee on Federal Overreach.

Dunleavy introduced multiple bills and resolutions to expand and enhance public charter schools, correspondence study programs, tax credits for educational contributions, and a constitutional amendment for the use of public education. He was successful with legislation in his second term, establishing Alaska's parental bill of rights.

In 2013, Dunleavy sponsored legislation to create Alaska's correspondence school allotment program, SB100. This program allowed parents of students enrolled in correspondence (homeschool) programs to use state education funds, called "allotments", for educational materials and services from public, private, or religious organizations. The legislation was passed in 2014 via an omnibus education package, HB278. Dunleavy's initiative aimed to increase educational flexibility for families, enabling them to tailor their children's education to better meet individual needs.

== Governor of Alaska ==
=== Elections ===
==== 2018 ====
In 2017, Dunleavy announced he would run for governor in 2018 but abandoned the race in September 2017, citing heart problems. In December 2017 he announced his return to the race. He resigned his Senate seat effective January 15, 2018, to focus on his campaign. Retired United States Air Force lieutenant colonel Mike Shower was chosen as his successor by Governor Bill Walker and confirmed by the Alaska Senate caucus after numerous replacement candidates were rejected.

==== 2022 ====
In August 2021, Dunleavy announced his candidacy for reelection in 2022. He was reelected with 50.3% of the vote, becoming the first incumbent Republican governor of Alaska to be reelected since Jay Hammond in 1978 and the first Alaska governor of any political affiliation to be reelected since Tony Knowles in 1998.

=== Tenure ===
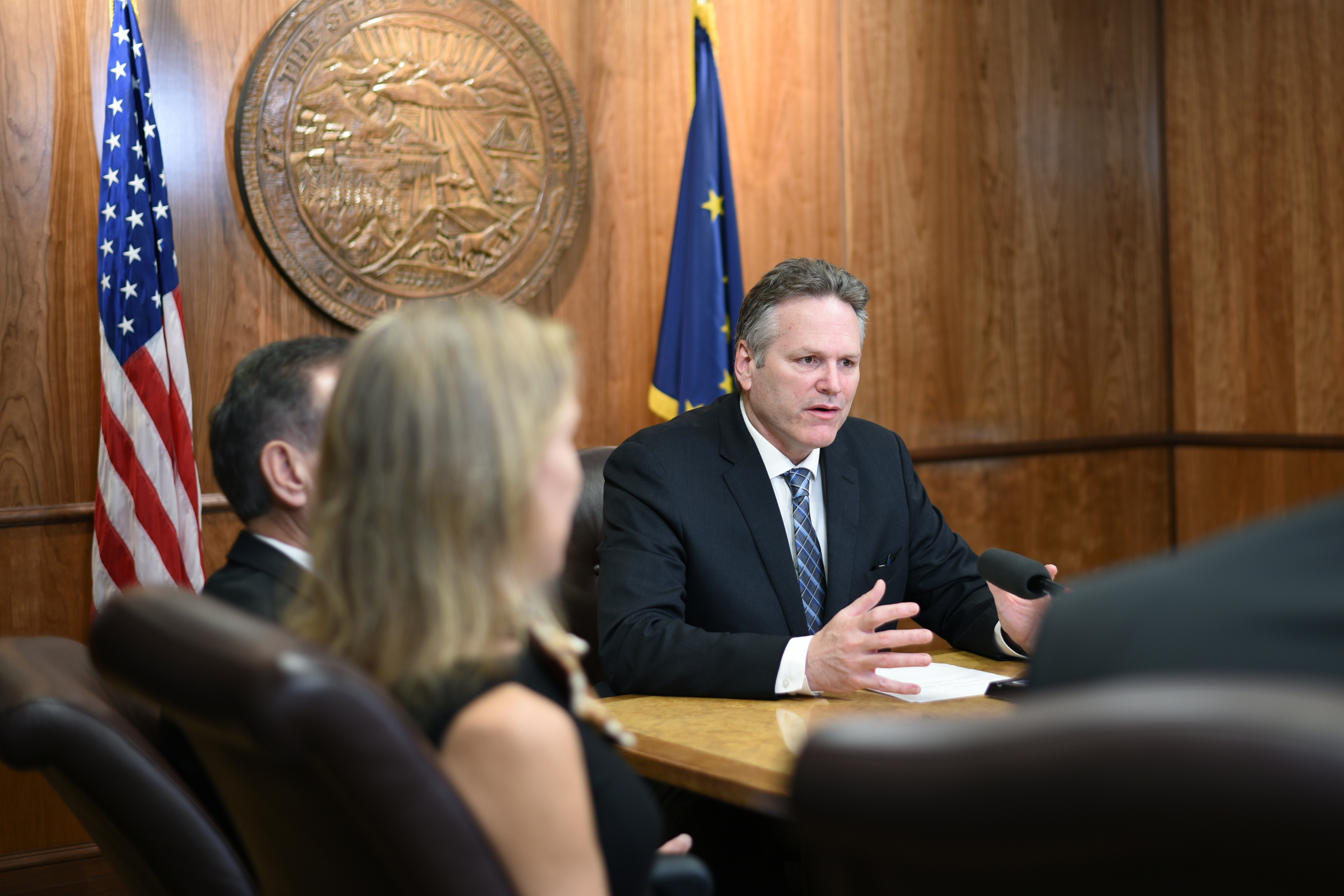
Dunleavy speaking in the governor's office, accompanied by members of his administration, on May 15, 2019.

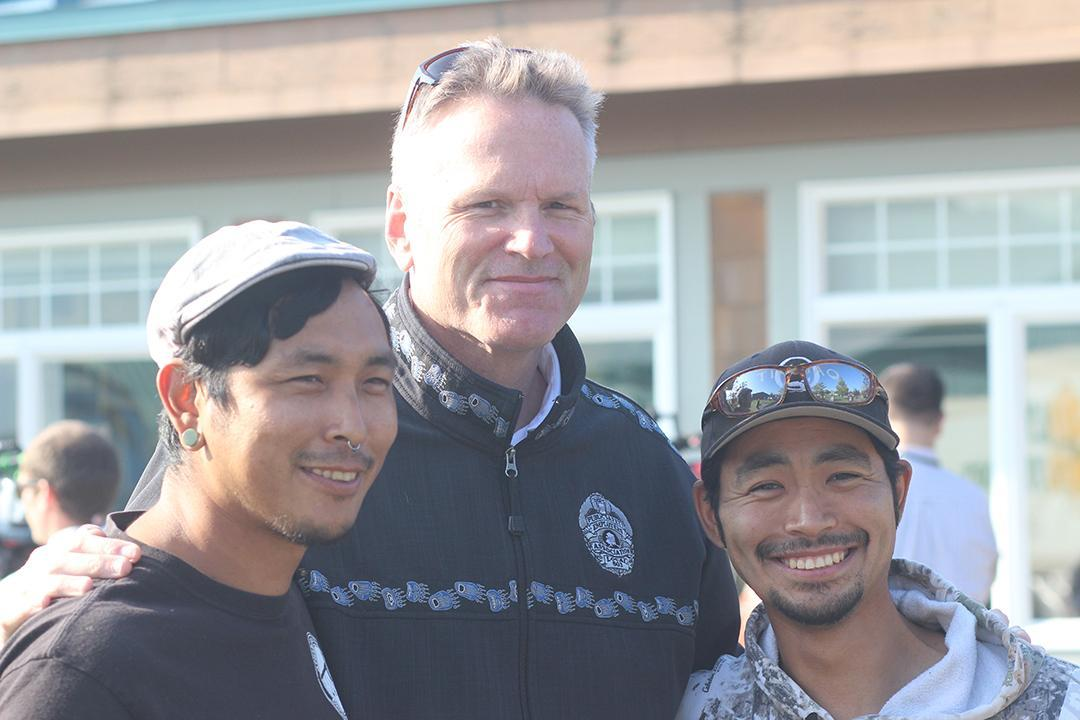
Dunleavy meeting with residents at a meeting regarding the Deshka Landing Fire in 2019.

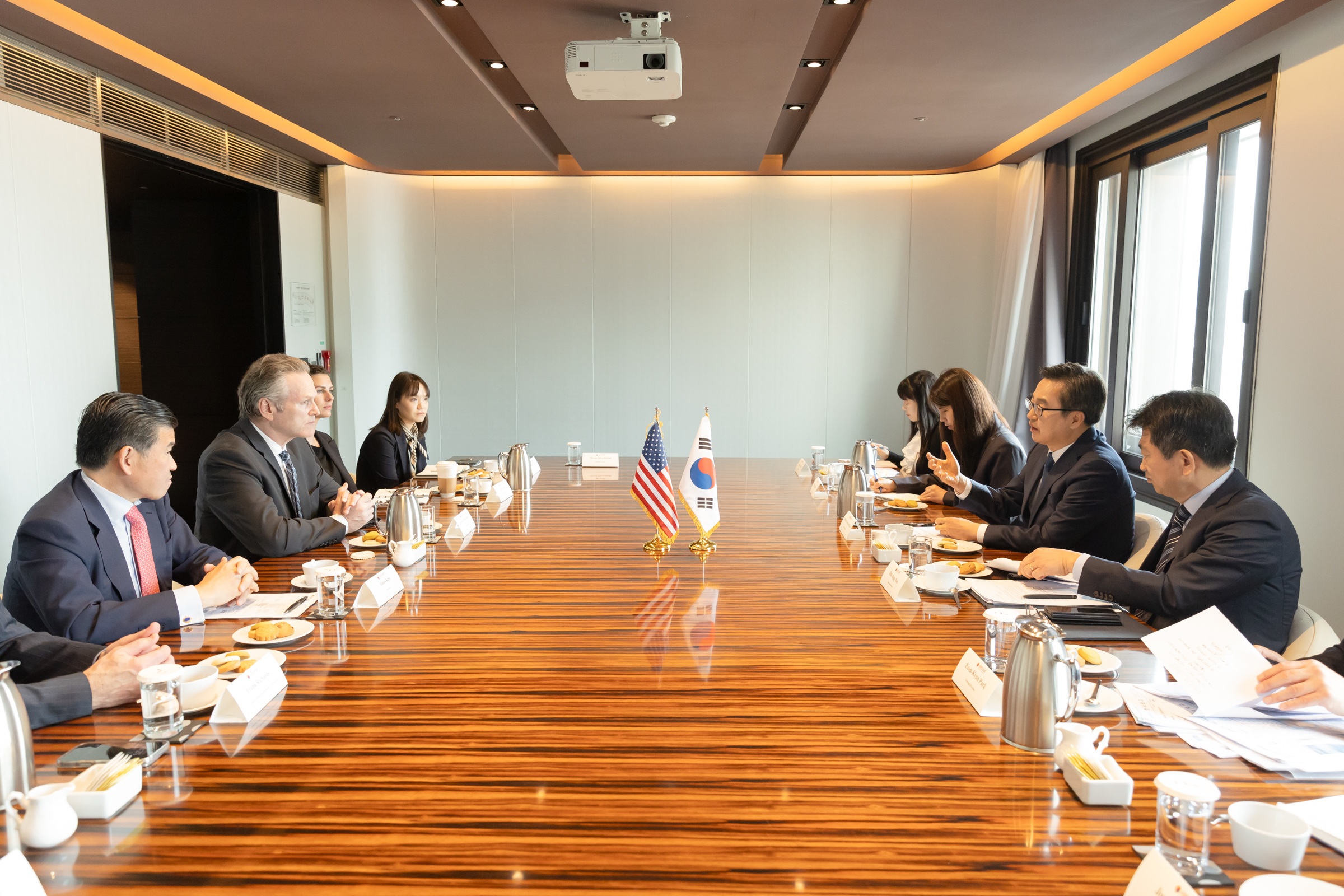
Dunleavy meeting with South Korea's Gyeonggi Province Governor Kim Dong-yeon in March 2025.

Dunleavy and Kevin Meyer were the Republican nominees for governor and lieutenant governor of Alaska, respectively, and were elected in the November 2018 general election. Dunleavy was sworn in on December 3, 2018. He appointed Kevin Clarkson to be Alaska attorney general. In 2021, Lieutenant Governor Kevin Meyer announced that he would not seek reelection. Dunleavy picked Nancy Dahlstrom as his running mate in the 2022 election.

==== Natural disasters and response ====
===== 2018 earthquake =====
A massive 7.1 magnitude earthquake struck Southcentral Alaska on November 30, 2018, three days before Dunleavy took office, causing significant damage throughout the region. Within hours, he and his team assessed the situation at the State Emergency Operations Center (SEOC) alongside the outgoing administration of Governor Bill Walker. On December 31, Dunleavy returned to the State Emergency Operations Center to personally thank the SEOC staff for their service.

On January 3, 2019, Dunleavy requested a Presidential Major Disaster Declaration for federal assistance to Alaska. He thanked President Donald Trump for approving the request for disaster assistance on January 31. Dunleavy sponsored the Disaster Relief Act of 2019 during the legislative session to assist with response, recovery, and relief efforts after the earthquake. The bill passed the legislature and was signed into law on April 5, 2019. Dunleavy said: "This bill is going to be very important for Alaska – Southcentral Alaska – to make sure we get our bridges and roads up to speed. As springtime continues to uncover potential infrastructure issues, this relief money is going to help tremendously."

===== Wildfires =====
In August 2019, Dunleavy issued a disaster declaration as a result of multiple wildfires in Alaska. 2.6 million acres burned that summer. "This declaration frees up financial assistance to help the victims of these devastating fires begin to rebuild their lives as quickly as possible", he said.

===== Typhoon Halong =====
In October 2025, the remnants of Typhoon Halong struck Western Alaska as a powerful extratropical cyclone, bringing hurricane-force winds and record storm surge to the Yukon–Kuskokwim Delta. The storm killed one woman in Kwigillingok, left two people missing, and displaced more than 1,500 residents, with the predominantly Yup'ik villages of Kipnuk and Kwigillingok hardest hit.

Dunleavy issued a state disaster declaration on October 9 for areas threatened by the storms, and amended it as conditions worsened to encompass the affected areas of the Yukon–Kuskokwim Delta. "Every effort will be made to help those hit by this storm", he said. Under his declaration, the State Emergency Operations Center was elevated to its highest response level, and Dunleavy directed the Alaska National Guard and the Alaska Organized Militia to support search-and-rescue and evacuation operations, which moved residents from flooded villages to Bethel and then to Anchorage in what state officials called the largest mass evacuation in Alaska history.

At a news conference in Anchorage on October 13, Dunleavy pledged sustained assistance, saying the state would "continue to help, not just today, tomorrow, but weeks and months on". He toured Kipnuk and Kwigillingok on October 17, calling Kipnuk "a disaster area" where homes were "tossed everywhere".

On October 16, Dunleavy submitted a request to President Trump for a Presidential Major Disaster Declaration covering both the Yukon–Kuskokwim region and storm-affected areas of northwestern Alaska, saying that many residents would not be able to return to their communities for more than 18 months. Trump approved the declaration on October 22, announcing $25 million in federal aid; Dunleavy said it authorized a 100% federal cost share for all categories of assistance for an initial 90 days. He called the declaration "instrumental for ongoing response and recovery efforts" and thanked Trump and his administration. In early November, with repair and debris-removal work paused for winter, Dunleavy signed a 30-day extension of the state declaration, with the recovery effort set to resume in spring 2026 in coordination with federal agencies, tribal organizations, and local partners.

==== Relationship with legislature ====
During Dunleavy's first six years as governor, at least one house of the Alaska Legislature had been led by Republicans. But during the 34th legislature, when both houses were controlled by a Democratic-led bipartisan coalition, Dunleavy vetoed more than one quarter of the bills the legislature passed, breaking the state record for most vetoes in a single legislative term.

==== Budget ====
On June 28, 2019, Dunleavy exercised line-item veto authority as governor to make cuts of $433 million, including a cut of $130 million (41%) of state contributions to the University of Alaska. He also vetoed $335,000 from the budget of the Alaska Supreme Court on the grounds that the Court had held that the state was constitutionally required to fund elective abortions.

In September 2020, Dunleavy agreed to reimburse the state $2,800 for allegedly partisan advertisements that were paid for with state funds. He did not admit wrongdoing, but said it was the state's best interest to resolve the allegations. On September 6, 2022, a complaint was filed alleging that Dunleavy's campaign was paying staffers with state funds.

In 2023, one of Dunleavy's advisors, Jeremy Cubas, resigned after inflammatory statements he made on his podcast became common knowledge.

==== Job approval ====
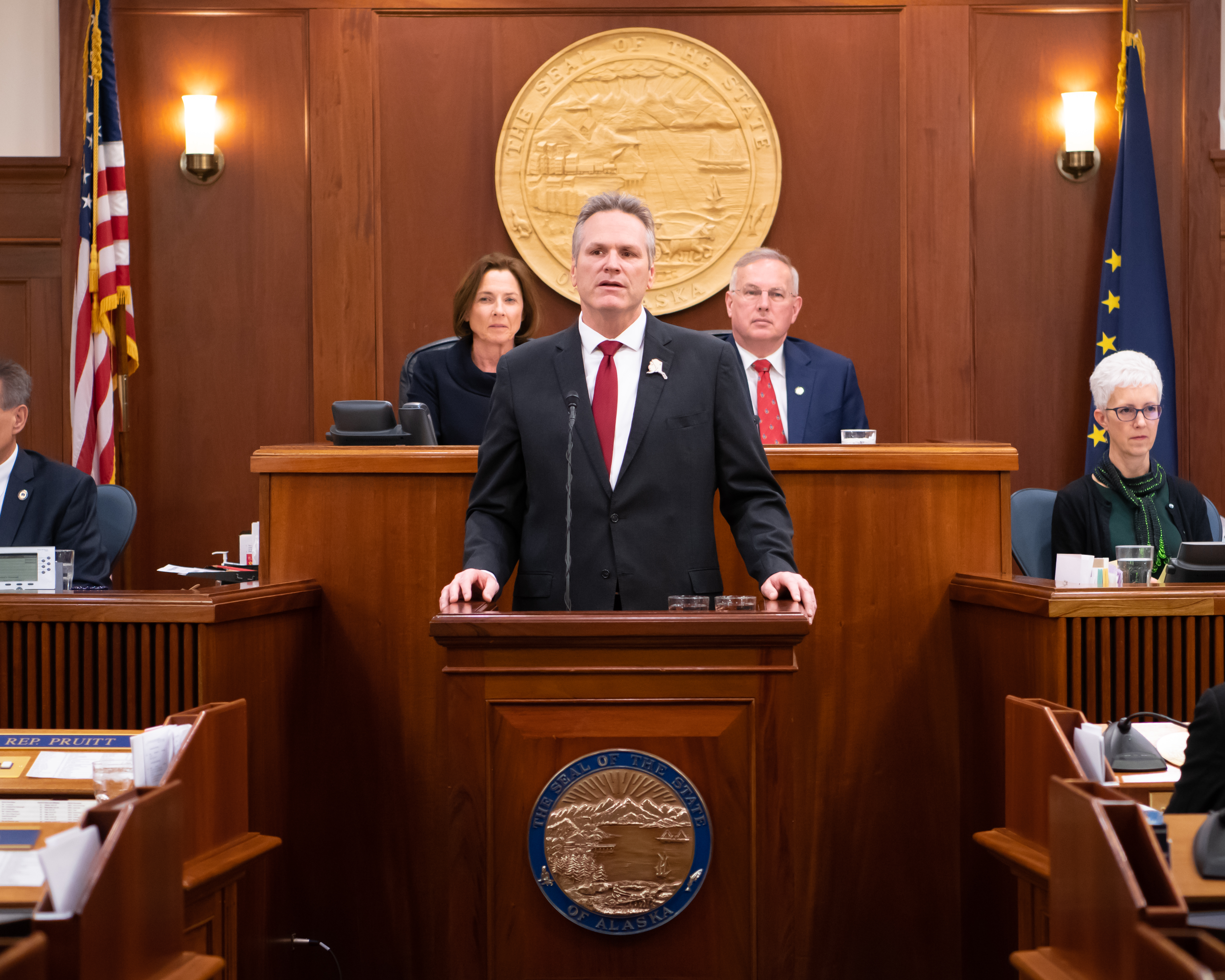
Governor Mike Dunleavy's State of the State before the Alaska State Legislature in 2020

A 2021 Morning Consult poll listed Dunleavy among the top 16 most popular governors in the United States.

In 2023, a Morning Consult poll showed Dunleavy as the fifth-most popular governor, with a job approval rating of 63%.

==== Recall attempt ====
On July 15, 2019, an effort to recall Dunleavy began after a public backlash over his cuts to public assistance, education and the University of Alaska ($135 million cut to state funding, about a 41% reduction). It was the second recall petition against a governor in Alaska history, the first being the failed petition against Governor Wally Hickel. Had the recall election been successful, Lieutenant Governor Kevin Meyer would have become governor.

To have the petition certified by the Division of Elections, the petitioners were first required to submit 28,501 signatures (approximately 10% of the voting population in Alaska's last general election). On September 5, 2019, volunteers submitted 49,006 petition signatures. On November 4, 2019, the Division of Elections declined to certify the recall petition after the Alaska attorney general Kevin Clarkson, a Dunleavy appointee, issued a legal opinion. Clarkson acknowledged that the petitioners had submitted enough signatures and paid the necessary fees, but asserted that "the four allegations against the governor 'fail to meet any of the listed grounds for recall—neglect of duty, incompetence, or lack of fitness'". The petitioners said they would appeal the division's decision.

In January 2020, Anchorage Superior Court Judge Eric Aarseth rejected the division's decision not to certify the recall petition. The state appealed Aarseth's ruling to the Alaska Supreme Court, which on May 8 affirmed that the recall effort could proceed.

The "Recall Dunleavy" effort failed to submit enough signatures to trigger a recall election in November 2020 or in 2021. Dunleavy won a second term as governor in November 2022 as part of the usual electoral process, making him the first governor to be reelected since Tony Knowles in 1998, and the first Republican governor to be reelected since Jay Hammond in 1978.

== Foreign trade and international affairs ==
=== Alaska LNG and the China negotiations ===
When Dunleavy took office in December 2018, the Alaska Gasline Development Corporation (AGDC), a state corporation created to advance the proposed Alaska LNG Project, was in negotiations with a Chinese state-owned consortium. In November 2017, under Governor Bill Walker, AGDC had signed a nonbinding joint development agreement in Beijing with Sinopec, Bank of China, and CIC Capital (an investment arm of the China Investment Corporation), in the presence of President Trump and Chinese President Xi Jinping.

After taking office, Dunleavy did not pursue the Chinese framework. AGDC instead sought partnerships directly with North Slope producers and other international buyers, and the joint development agreement was not extended. AGDC later conducted a public solicitation for a new lead developer and on January 6, 2025, announced an exclusive framework agreement to privately develop the project; the developer, initially unnamed, was confirmed within days to be Glenfarne Group. AGDC and Glenfarne signed binding definitive agreements on March 27, 2025, under which Glenfarne became majority owner and lead developer, acquiring a 75% stake in 8 Star Alaska, the AGDC subsidiary holding the project's assets, while the state retained 25%.

=== Trade mission to Japan ===
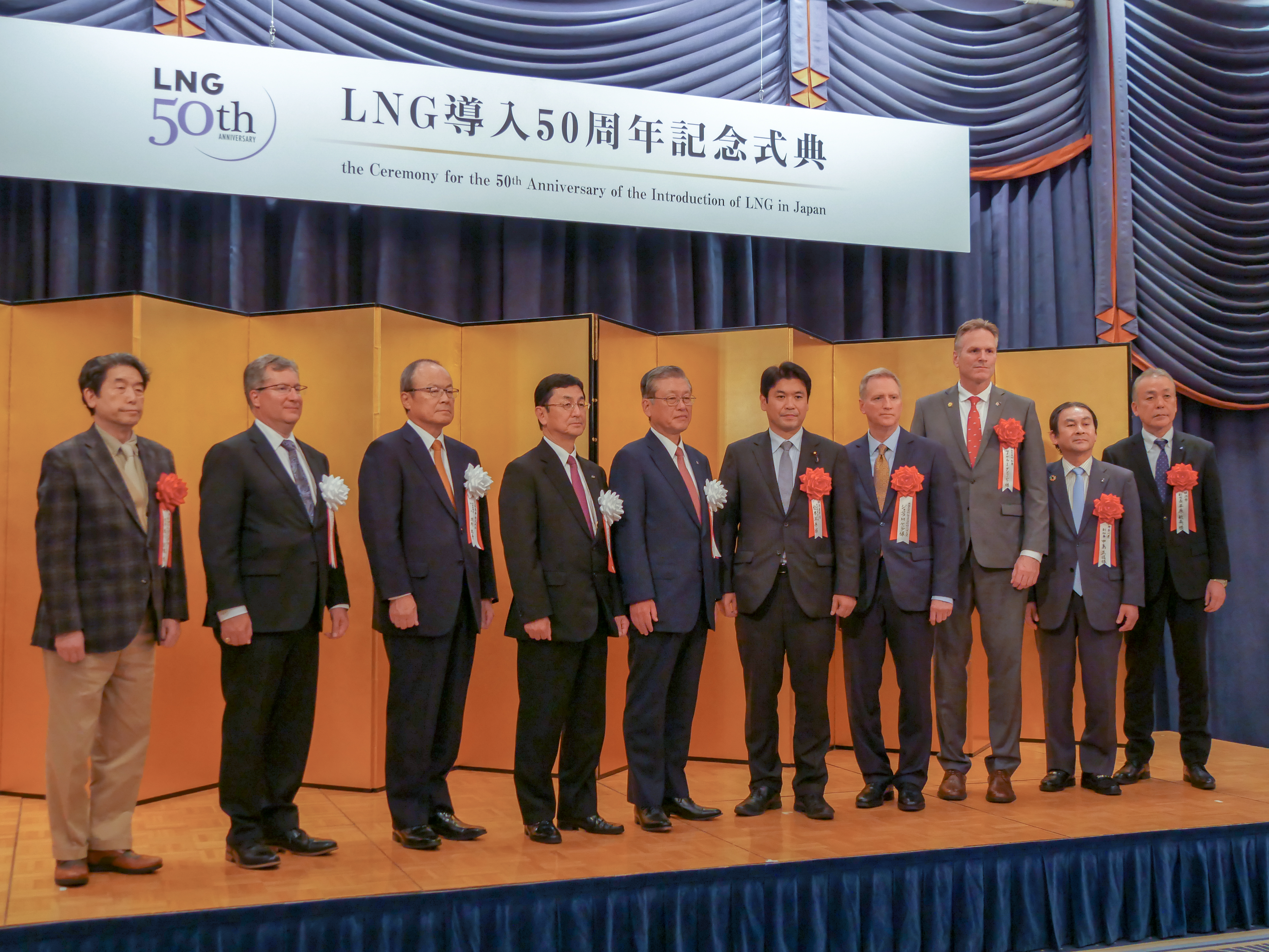
Alaska Governor Michael J. Dunleavy pictured here with representatives of ConocoPhillips, Mitsubishi, TOGAS, and JERA, the original Alaska LNG Project partners involved with the first shipment of Alaska LNG to Japan.

Dunleavy's first trade mission as governor was to Japan in November 2019, timed to coincide with the 50th anniversary of the first Alaska LNG shipment, which had been delivered from the Kenai LNG terminal to the Negishi LNG Receiving Terminal near Tokyo in November 1969. On November 6, Dunleavy toured the Negishi terminal and met with executives from Tokyo Gas.

== Political positions ==
=== Economy and workforce development ===
In 2020, Dunleavy established the Alaska Development Team to promote business growth and attract new investments to the state. The team aims to facilitate business operations in Alaska and encourage companies to invest in industries like oil and gas, mining, tourism, commercial fishing, and aerospace.

In 2023, Dunleavy issued Administrative Order 343 to address workforce shortages by removing four-year degree requirements for most state jobs. This initiative aimed to expand employment opportunities and increase workforce flexibility. "If we're going to address our labor shortage, we have to recognize the value that apprenticeships, on-the-job training, military training, trade schools and other experience provides applicants. If a person can do the job, we shouldn't be holding anyone back just because they don't have a degree."

==== Alaska LNG Project ====
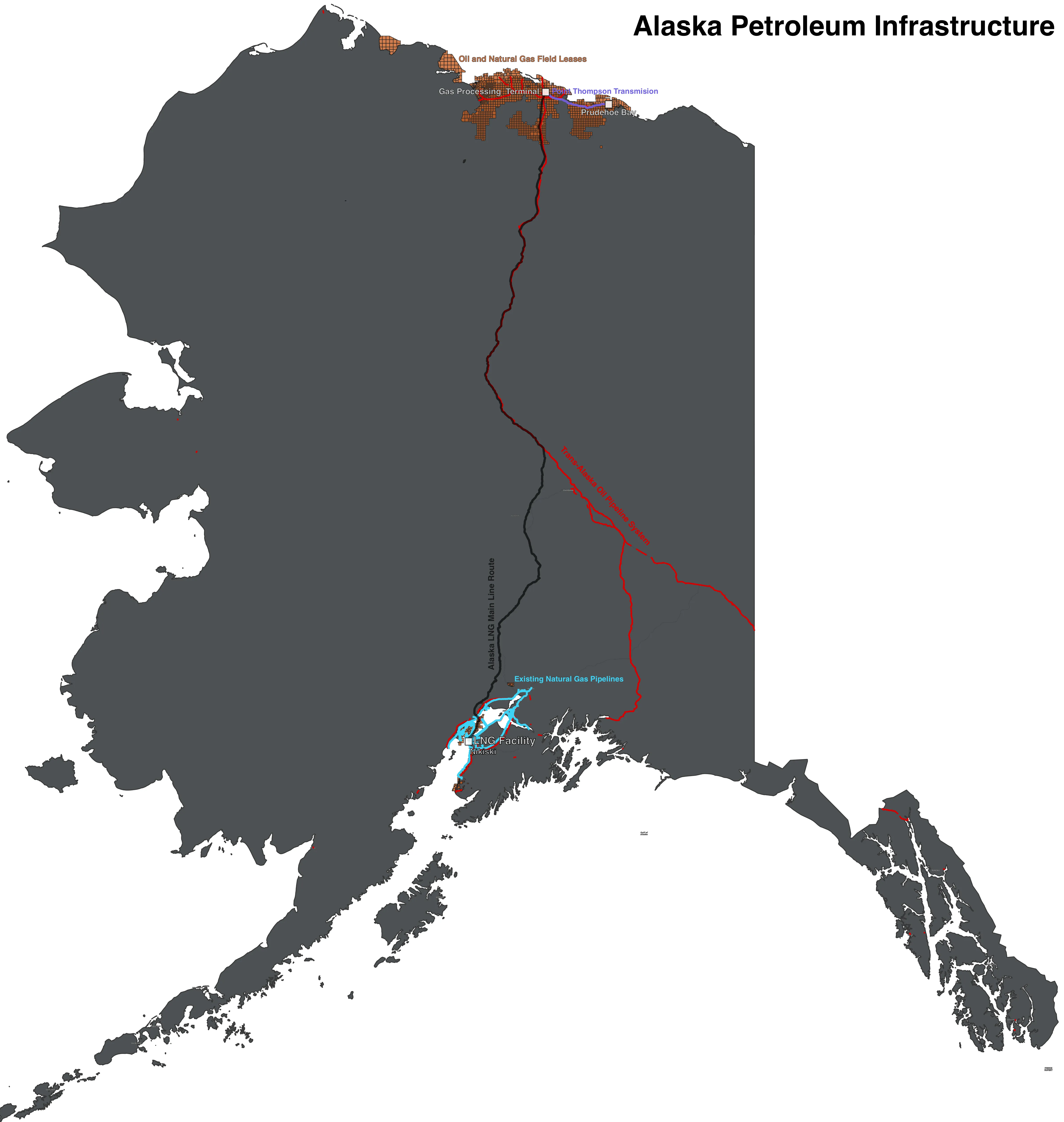
Alaska oil and natural gas pipelines, and proposed natural gas pipelines.

Dunleavy's administration has made significant efforts to enhance Alaska's economy and workforce development. One major initiative is the advancement of the Alaska LNG Project, which aims to build an 800-mile pipeline to transport liquefied natural gas (LNG) from the North Slope to southern Alaska for export, with potential markets in Asia. "The Alaska LNG project is well positioned for Alaska to realize the decades-old dream of bringing our natural gas off the North Slope for the benefit of Alaskans and worldwide markets", Dunleavy said.

In 2022, Alaska officials, including Dunleavy, the head of the state's gas line agency, and U.S. Senator Dan Sullivan, met with Japanese energy representatives to promote the Alaska LNG project in Tokyo. U.S. Ambassador to Japan Rahm Emanuel convened the meeting to discuss the prospect of exporting liquefied natural gas from Alaska's North Slope to Japan.

In 2024, an independent report by Wood Mackenzie estimated that the pipeline project could stimulate industrial demand, reduce emissions, and provide long-term economic benefits to Alaska. The report also concluded that the delivered cost of gas via the pipeline would likely be lower than LNG imports, especially when considering the potential for additional industrial demand.

In March 2025, Dunleavy announced significant progress on the Alaska LNG Project to transport natural gas from the North Slope to global markets. The state reached a definitive agreement with Glenfarne Group, a private energy infrastructure firm, granting it a 75% ownership stake in 8 Star Alaska—the entity managing the project. Glenfarne will lead the development through to construction and operation, with the State of Alaska retaining a 25% share. The project encompasses an 807-mile pipeline, a liquefaction facility in Nikiski capable of exporting up to 20 million tons of LNG annually, and a carbon capture plant designed to sequester 7 million tons of carbon dioxide each year. During a press conference in Tokyo, part of a broader Asian tour to secure investment and buyers, Dunleavy highlighted a non-binding letter of intent from Taiwan's CPC Corporation to purchase 6 million tons of LNG annually and potentially invest in the project. Discussions with officials and business leaders in South Korea and Japan also indicated interest, though no binding agreements were reached. Dunleavy emphasized the project's potential to enhance energy security for both Alaska and its Asian partners, aiming for a final investment decision by the end of 2025 and operations to commence by 2030.

=== Education ===
==== Alaska Reads Act ====
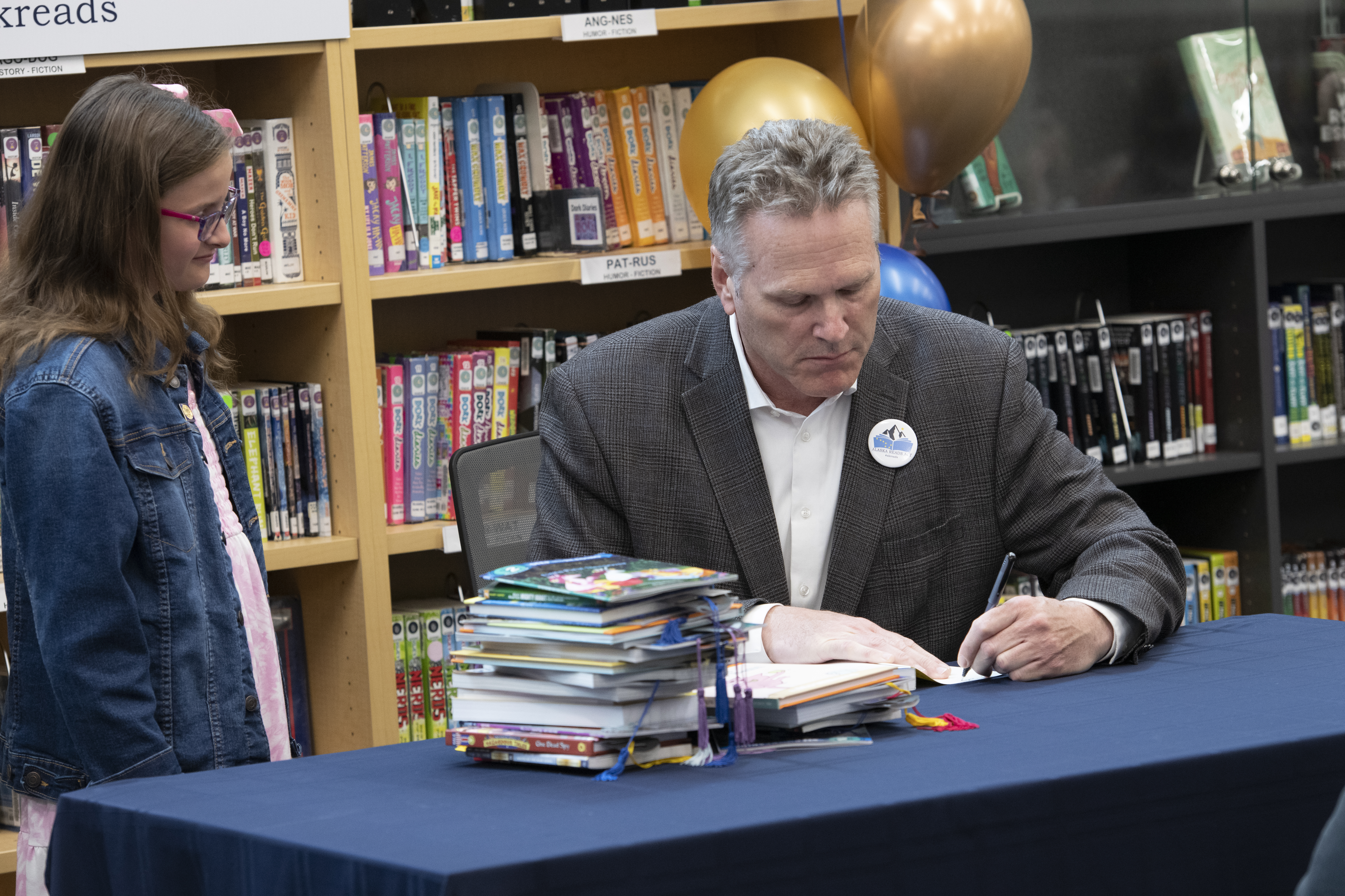
Governor Mike Dunleavy during the ceremony celebrating the Alaska Reads Act signed into law

In 2020, Dunleavy announced a bipartisan initiative called the Alaska Reads Act, which "focused on enhancing interventions for struggling readers and offering targeted school-improvement in the state's lowest performing schools". The Alaska Reads Act aimed to improve reading for kindergarten through third-grade students with a reading intervention program, teacher training, and data reporting requirements. Dunleavy worked with State Senator Tom Begich to introduce the bill. The Alaska Legislature passed the Alaska Reads Act in May 2022. Implementation of the program began in 2023. Program outcomes in 2024 showed improvement. At the beginning of the school year, 41% of students reached early literacy benchmarks. By the end of the year, this figure increased to 57%. Among kindergartners, the proficiency rate rose from 24% at the start of the year to 60% by the year's end. Dunleavy issued the statement, "I'm encouraged by the improvements Alaska's students are already experiencing because of the Alaska Reads Act, as these results are beginning to show, when we implement effective education reform, Alaska's students are capable of success."

=== COVID-19 ===
On March 11, 2020, Dunleavy's office declared a state of emergency to ensure all entities had the necessary response resources a day before the first case arrived via a foreign national in Anchorage. Two days later, Dunleavy ordered public schools to close from March 16 to 30. That April, Dunleavy activated the State Emergency Operations Center under Alaska's Department of Military and Veterans Affairs. Joint Task Force-Alaska was stood up to provide a coordinated effort for the Alaska Army and Air National Guard, the Alaska State Defense Force, and the Alaska Naval Militia to support the state.

On May 19, Dunleavy announced the lifting of all state mandates for businesses and public gatherings, keeping only a mandatory (but unenforced) quarantine period for persons coming from out of state. A month later, Dunleavy announced a new extension of the two-week quarantine measure that required visitors to Alaska to present a negative test for the virus if they were not willing to self-quarantine for two weeks.

In April 2021, Dunleavy announced that Alaska would offer free vaccinations to tourists at major airports starting June 1, as part of the United States' vaccination campaign. That October, Dunleavy refused to issue another COVID-19 disaster declaration, thinking it unnecessary. "Exercising the Disaster Act does not give our team any more health tools than what they need and are using right now", he said, adding, "Masking is, as I have stated, a local issue best left to local leaders." Dunleavy later clarified that he didn't endorse mask or vaccine mandates but wouldn't ban them either. The next month, he ordered state agencies to ignore federal vaccine mandates, arguing that they were "unconstitutional" and "completely unnecessary" and claiming that Alaska had handled COVID better than nearly every other state.

=== Abortion ===
Dunleavy opposes abortion. In July 2019, he vetoed $334,700 for the state to pay for abortions from the court system's budget. The Dunleavy administration wrote, "The legislative and executive branch are opposed to state-funded elective abortions; the only branch of government that insists on state-funded elective abortions is the Supreme Court." A year later, Anchorage Superior Court Judge Jennifer S. Henderson ruled that Dunleavy's vetoes in 2019 and 2020 were unconstitutional and violated the separation of powers doctrine: "In spite of this Court's faith that the Alaska judiciary remains independent and committed to its essential function of deciding cases according to the rule of law, the Court must unfortunately conclude that in vetoing funds appropriated to the State appellate courts in express retaliation against the Alaska Supreme Court for its legal decision-making, the Governor violated the separation of powers doctrine."

=== Alaska Permanent Fund Dividend ===
As a candidate and governor, Dunleavy advocated for the Alaska Permanent Fund Dividend (PFD), consistently pushing for full statutory payments to Alaskans. The Alaska Permanent Fund is a state-owned investment fund established in 1976 to invest surplus revenue from Alaska's oil and gas reserves. The PFD is an annual payout from the fund's earnings to eligible Alaska residents. During Governor Bill Walker's administration, the payments were reduced through the legislative budget process. A fundamental change in how the payouts were conducted resulted in smaller checks.

In 2019, Dunleavy introduced bills to restore the dividends and repay Alaskans for the previous reduced payments, saying, "The PFD must be paid out according to the law, Alaskans must be paid back what the governor arbitrarily took from them, and future actions involving the PFD must be approved by voters." In 2020, he submitted a budget amendment to the legislature to fully fund the 2019 dividend.

Dunleavy also submitted bills to establish a PFD Land Voucher program to allow Alaska residents to receive land vouchers worth twice the value of a dividend for purchasing state land. This initiative aimed to promote land ownership among residents and enhance state revenue.

Despite legislative resistance, Dunleavy continued to advocate higher dividends. In 2021, he proposed an amendment to the Alaska Constitution to guarantee the dividend's payment by using a formula. By 2022, with oil revenues rising to unexpected levels, a $3,700 PFD was proposed to give immediate economic relief to Alaskans facing high inflation and fuel costs. Revenue forecasts suggested that the state could afford significant PFD payments while maintaining budget surpluses and savings.

=== Environment ===
Dunleavy rejects the scientific consensus on climate change. In February 2019, he abolished Alaska's climate change task force, a team instated by Bill Walker, calling it unnecessary.

In September 2019, during a meeting at the International Forum of Sovereign Wealth Funds with Mark Gordon, Dunleavy said that warming the Arctic could be good for Alaska, believing that it could create further business opportunities. In October 2019, Dunleavy clashed with Representative Alexandria Ocasio-Cortez on Twitter over the Green New Deal proposal, saying that the Green New Deal would impact our civilization as we know it.

=== Energy and natural resources ===
In September 2020, Dunleavy expressed support for renewable energy ideas: "I know there's a view on the part of some that a Republican governor that is supportive of Alaska's resource extraction industries, including those around fossil fuels, would not want anything to do with renewables" and "It makes total sense to explore pumped hydro, using wind as a main source of energy and the reservoir as the batteries."

In February 2022, Dunleavy denounced the Biden administration's request for suspension of the Ambler Road Project: "The Biden Administration has opened yet another front in its war on Alaska. You would think President Biden would want to improve access to American sources of copper and other strategic minerals that are needed in our combined efforts to increase renewables. Instead, actions like this only serve to push development to Third World nations that don't have the environmental ethic that Alaskans have. This pendulum swing away from the last federal administration's approval disregards extensive environmental studies and widespread social engagement while creating instability in long-term investment."

Dunleavy has encouraged the United States Environmental Protection Agency to approve the permit for Pebble Mine, which other Alaska politicians oppose because it would threaten the fishery of Bristol Bay.

==== Alaska Sustainable Energy Conference ====
In May 2022, Dunleavy sponsored the first annual Alaska Sustainable Energy Conference in Anchorage. Over 80 speakers, including policymakers and experts, discussed strategies to harness Alaska's renewable energy resources and achieve energy independence. Over 500 people attended. On the conference's first day, Dunleavy signed into law a nuclear microreactor bill intended to create low-cost, reliable power for communities, remote villages, and resource development projects, and reduce reliance on volatile energy sources.

==== Carbon offset markets ====
In 2023, Dunleavy introduced a legislative package to diversify Alaska's revenue through carbon markets alongside existing oil and gas revenues and the Alaska Permanent Fund. The legislation, signed into law on May 23, established rules for storing carbon dioxide underground and initiated a carbon offsets program. This initiative aimed to complement existing industries, not replace them.

"This bill specifically creates new authorities for State agencies to license, lease, and administer the State's pore space for geological storage; administer pipeline infrastructure for transportation of captured carbon to geological storage facilities and administer injection wells and carbon storage facilities; and protect correlative rights of all subsurface owners."

==== Unlocking Alaska Initiative ====
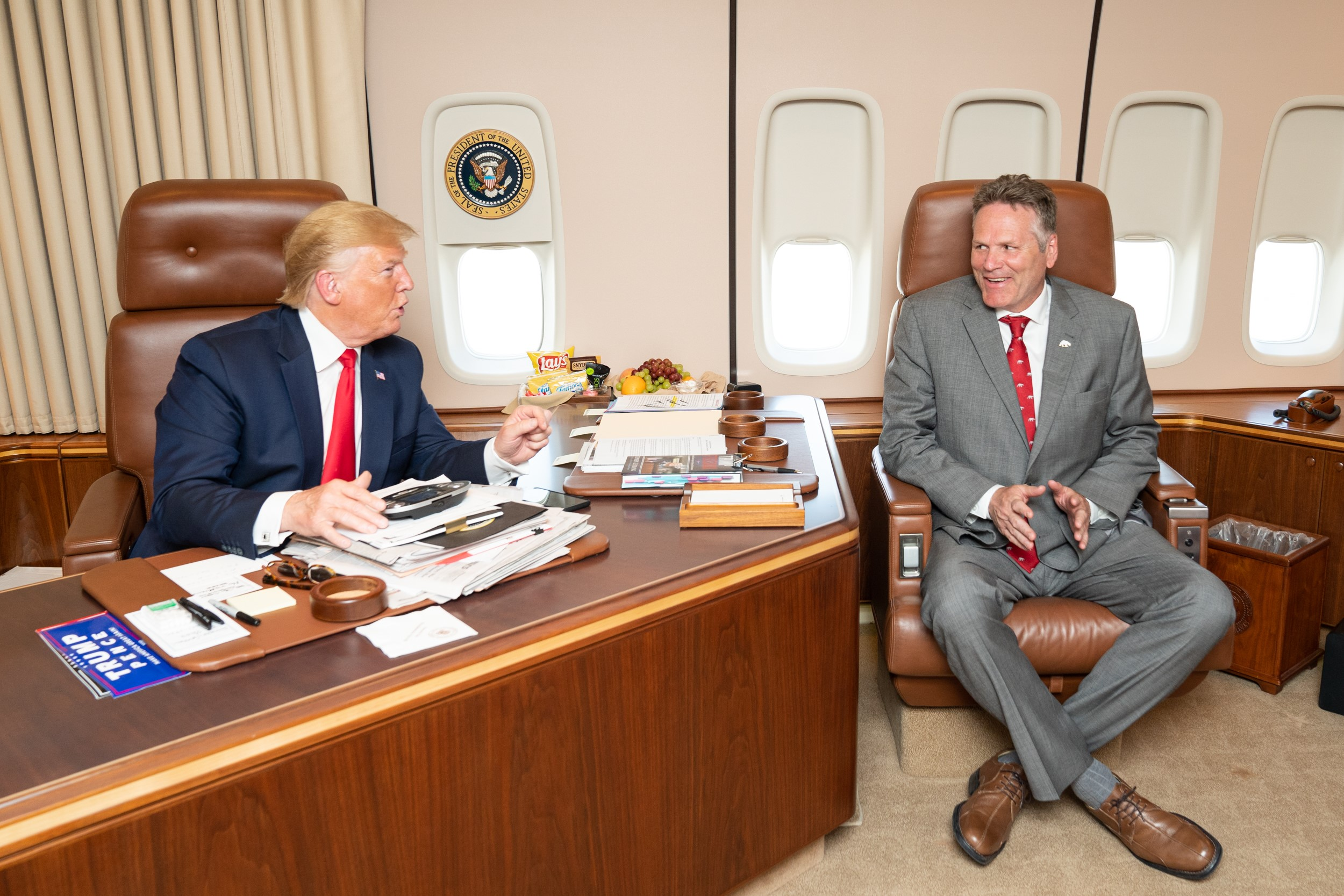
Governor Dunleavy with President Donald Trump

Dunleavy's administration took several initiatives to assert state control over federal lands and waters. These efforts aimed to reduce federal overreach and increase Alaska's autonomy in managing its natural resources. In March 2021, Dunleavy announced the "Unlocking Alaska" initiative to assert state control over approximately 800,000 miles of Alaska's navigable rivers, lakes, and tidelands. This move aimed to end decades of federal obstruction and delay in recognizing Alaska's ownership of these waters, and to enforce state rights promised under the Alaska Statehood Act. The initiative was inspired by the Supreme Court decision Sturgeon v. Frost, which affirmed Alaska's authority over its navigable waters within federal conservation units. Dunleavy emphasized reducing federal interference and enhancing state management for economic use and recreational access. He took legal and administrative actions, including a lawsuit against the federal government, issuing trespass notices, and sending cease-and-desist letters to federal agencies such as the Forest Service and the National Park Service.

Dunleavy's "Unlocking Alaska" initiative was boosted when the Interior Board of Land Appeals upheld Alaska's ownership of 7,552 acres of submerged lands under the Kuskokwim River. This decision validated the state's long-standing claims under the Equal Footing Doctrine and the Submerged Lands Act. The state had initially applied for a recordable disclaimer of interest, which the Bureau of Land Management denied. The appeal's success supported further actions by Alaska to assert land rights and challenge federal overreach. "The essential legal principles supporting Alaska's win in this case are the same ones underlying my 'Unlocking Alaska' Initiative", Dunleavy said. "While it's taken nearly six years, the Interior Department has acknowledged that the U.S. Constitution and federal law make it clear Alaska owns submerged lands in Alaska."

=== Criminal justice ===
From 2019 to 2023, Alaska's crime rate dropped about 31%. During the same period, violent crime dropped by 15.9%.

==== Repeal of SB91 and other initiatives ====
Dunleavy's campaign platform focused on repealing and replacing Senate Bill 91 (SB91), a comprehensive criminal justice reform act signed into law by Governor Bill Walker on July 11, 2016. SB91 implemented recommendations from a 2015 Alaska Criminal Justice Commission report to reform Alaska's parole and pretrial systems, generally lowering criminal punishments for nonviolent offenses. But the implementation of SB91 coincided with a spike in crime, leading to concern and anger among many Alaskans. This rise in crime was largely attributed to the reforms SB91 introduced.

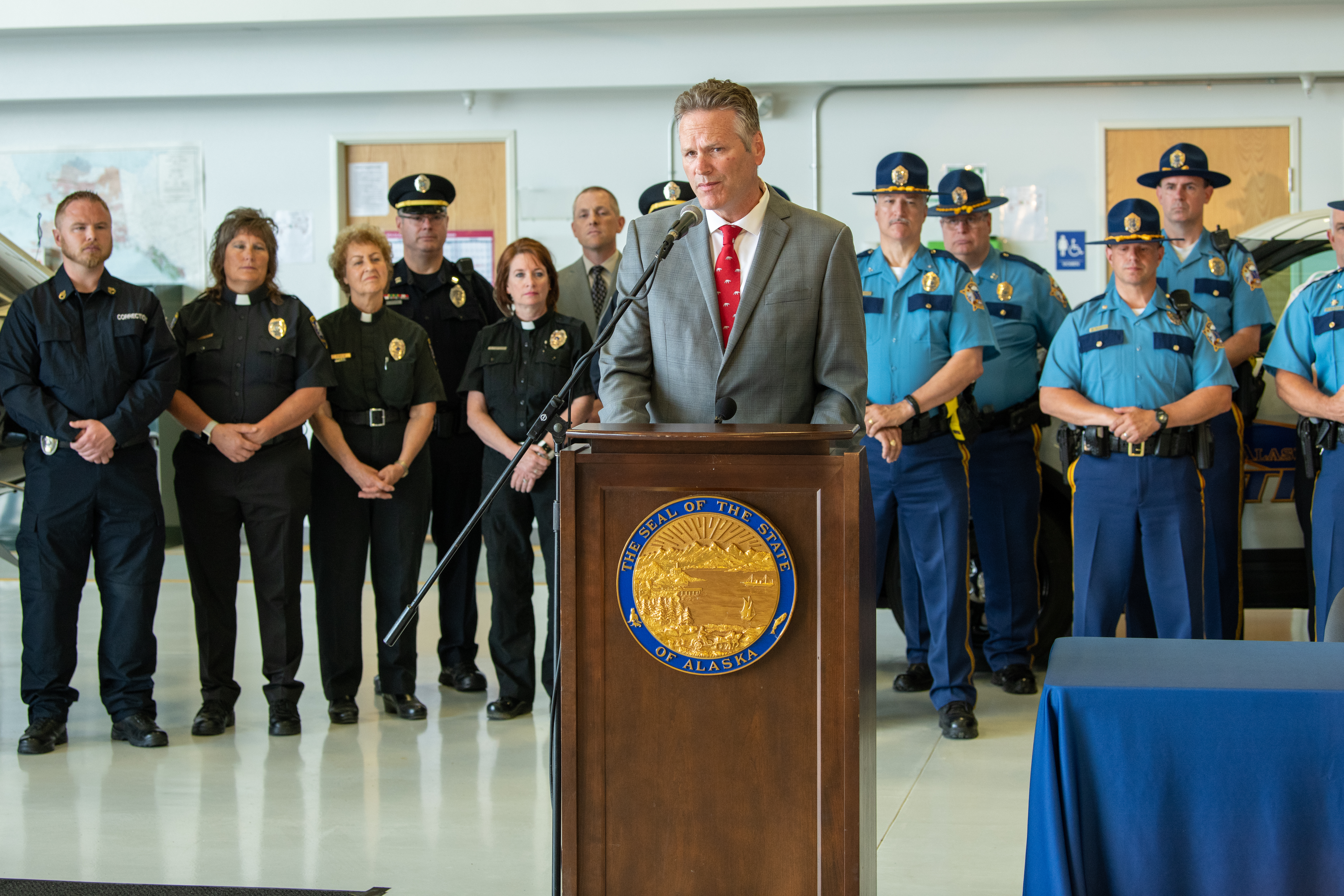
Governor Mike Dunleavy during the bill signing ceremony for HB49

In January 2019, Dunleavy announced that he would repeal and replace SB91 and declare "war on criminals" by proposing four bills that would increase criminal penalties for sexual offenses; reverse a range of reductions to sentences; add a new category of crime called terroristic threatening; increase bail and give judges more discretion in how people charged with crimes are released before trials; and reduce the use of parole. He said, "If you are a criminal, this is the beginning of the end for your activities", and "If you're going to assault people—if you're going to engage in sexual assaults, physical assaults—this is going to be a very unsafe place for you. We're not going to tolerate it at all." One of these bills, House Bill 49 (HB49), passed the legislature and repealed many reforms made in 2016. On Twitter, Dunleavy posted, "Public safety has been priority # 1 for my admin, I'm pleased the House has passed legislation to repeal the failed SB91 & replace it with common sense crime laws that will give police, judges, & prosecutors the tools they need to address the crime wave in Alaska." He signed HB49 into law on July 8, 2019.

In 2024, Dunleavy signed a comprehensive crime bill aimed at improving public safety. The legislation targets issues like fentanyl, child exploitation, and human trafficking, while enhancing protections for crime victims. It includes stricter penalties for drug-related deaths, updates the sex offender registry, and introduces new crimes, such as assaulting someone in a child's presence.

=== Public safety ===
==== Staffing and vacancies ====
From the start of his tenure, Dunleavy's administration, along with the legislature, steadily increased the number of budgeted law enforcement positions, reflecting a commitment to strengthening public safety. In fiscal year 2019, the state allocated funding for 387 positions, which grew each year, reaching 444 budgeted positions by fiscal year 2025—a 14.7% increase over the period.

==== Sexual assault rape kits ====
In 2021, Dunleavy's administration announced that thousands of unprocessed sexual assault kits had been cleared. In 2016, it was discovered that there was a significant backlog of SAR kits. Dunleavy said, "We've put in place internal steps to prevent this kind of backlog from ever happening again and added resources to the State crime lab to ensure every kit is tested within 90 days or sooner." His initiative included the use of software and a tracking database to allow survivors and agencies involved in sexual assault response to track the status and location of sexual assault examination kits.

==== George Floyd ====
In May 2020, after the murder of George Floyd, Dunleavy called the act "horrific" and thanked Alaskans for their peaceful protests. "People absolutely have the right to protest: This is America", Dunleavy said. "What occurred in Minneapolis when Mr. Floyd was killed in that police action, we all know is terrible." But Dunleavy expressed concern that the protests in Alaska could spread COVID-19, noting that any events that combine people being in close proximity with singing and shouting can spread the virus. He emphasized advice from state officials that people at gatherings wear face masks or stay at least 6 to 10 feet away from others.

=== Second Amendment ===
Dunleavy advocated for Alaskans' Second Amendment right to bear arms while campaigning and during his tenure. He was endorsed by the NRA Political Victory Fund in 2018 and 2022.

In 2022, Dunleavy applauded a Supreme Court decision that struck down New York's firearm licensing policy as unconstitutional, calling it a significant win for the Second Amendment and law-abiding Americans.

In 2023, he supported and signed into law House Bill 61, a bill to block state and local officials from closing gun stores during disasters declared by the governor unless such closures apply to all other businesses. This marked the first major pro-Second Amendment legislation passed in Alaska. "This bill reflects the constitutional right Alaskans have to keep and bear arms by protecting access to both firearms and ammunition when Alaskans need it the most", Dunleavy said.

=== Immigration ===
In May 2022, Dunleavy expressed opposition to the termination of Title 42 by the Centers for Disease Control: "The Termination Order is detrimental to the states tasked with enforcing immigration standards, and it is not logically appropriate" and "This policy runs contrary to the Biden Administration's other declarations because it is expressly premised on the decrease of COVID-19, but the Administration has ignored these facts by enforcing mandatory vaccination and mask mandates."

=== Voting rights ===
In January 2022, Dunleavy called on legislators to "improve election integrity" by prohibiting automatic voter registration, tracking absentee balloting, requiring signature verification, and implementing voter roll maintenance, saying, "We just want to make sure that as we move forward in Alaska that our concerns, our worries, are taken care of."

== Electoral history ==
2018 Republican primary results
Party	Candidate	Votes	%
Republican	Mike Dunleavy	43,802	61.5
Republican	Mead Treadwell	22,780	32.0
Republican	Michael Sheldon	1,640	2.3
Republican	Merica Hlatcu	1,064	1.5
Republican	Thomas Gordon	884	1.4
Republican	Gerald Heikes	499	0.7
Republican	Darin Colbry	416	0.6
Total votes		71,195	100.0

2018 Alaska gubernatorial election
Party	Candidate	Votes	%	±%
Republican	Mike Dunleavy	145,631	51.44%	+5.56%
Democratic	Mark Begich	125,739	44.41%	+44.41%
Independent	Bill Walker (inc.) (withdrawn)	5,757	2.03%	−46.07%
Libertarian	William Toien	5,402	1.91%	−1.30%
Write-in		605	0.21%	-0.11%
Total votes		283,134	100.0%	N/A
Republican gain from Independent				

Primary election results
Party	Candidate	Votes	%
Republican	Mike Dunleavy (incumbent); Nancy Dahlstrom	76,534	40.43
Democratic	Les Gara; Jessica Cook	43,660	23.06
Independent	Bill Walker; Heidi Drygas	43,111	22.77
Republican	Charlie Pierce; Edie Grunwald	12,458	6.58
Republican	Christopher Kurka; Paul Hueper	7,307	3.86
Independence	John Howe; Shellie Wyatt	1,702	0.90
Republican	Bruce Walden; Tanya Lange	1,661	0.88
Libertarian	William S. Toien; Shirley Rainbolt	1,381	0.73
Republican	David Haeg; Waynette Coleman	1,139	0.60
Independent	William Nemec; Ronnie Ostrem	347	0.18
Total votes		188,626	100.00

<meta /> <meta />

2022 Alaska gubernatorial election
Party	Candidate	Votes	%	±%
Republican	Mike Dunleavy (incumbent); Nancy Dahlstrom	132,632	50.29%	−1.15%
Democratic	Les Gara; Jessica Cook	63,851	24.21%	−20.20%
Independent	Bill Walker; Heidi Drygas	54,668	20.73%	+18.70%
Republican	Charlie Pierce; Edie Grunwald (withdrew) (Note: Suspended her campaign and endorsed Dunleavy on October 25, 2022 after allegations of sexual harassment against Pierce but remained on the ballot.)	11,817	4.48%	N/A
Write-in		784	0.30%	+0.09%
Total votes		263,752	100.0%	
Turnout		266,472	44.33%	−5.49%
Registered electors		601,161		
Republican hold				

== Notes ==
Party political offices
Preceded by Sean Parnell	Republican nominee for Governor of Alaska; 2018, 2022	Succeeded by Bernadette Wilson
Political offices
Preceded by Bill Walker	Governor of Alaska; 2018–present	Incumbent
U.S. order of precedence (ceremonial)
Preceded by JD Vance as Vice President	Order of precedence of the United States; Within Alaska	Succeeded by Mayor of city in which event is held
Preceded by JD Vance as Vice President	Order of precedence of the United States; Within Alaska	Succeeded by Otherwise Mike Johnson as Speaker of the House
Preceded by Katie Hobbs as Governor of Arizona	Order of precedence of the United States; Outside Alaska	Succeeded by Josh Green as Governor of Hawaii
