= 2026 Alaska Senate election =

2026 Alaska Senate elections
- November 3, 2026

10 of 20 seats in the Alaska Senate 11 seats needed for a majority

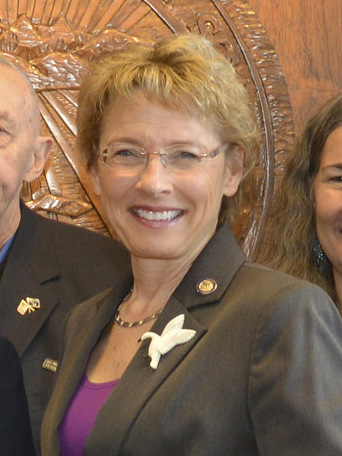

	Majority party	Minority party	Third party
Leader	Mike Cronk	Cathy Giessel (Note: Giessel, a Republican, was selected as majority leader under a Democratic-led coalition)
Party	Republican	Democratic	Independent
Leader since	December 16, 2025	January 17, 2023
Leader's seat	R–Tok	E–Anchorage
Last election	11 seats, 63.76%	9 seats, 27.55%	0 seats, 3.45%
Seats before	11	9 (Note: All Democrats and five Republicans form a governing coalition)	0
Seats after	11	8	1
Seat change	Steady	▼1	▲1
Seats up	6	4
- Democratic incumbent Democratic incumbent retiring Republican incumbent Republican incumbent retiring
Senate President before election
Gary Stevens
Republican (coalition)
Elected Senate President
TBD

The 2026 Alaska Senate elections took place on November 3, 2026, with the primary elections being held on August 18, 2026. State senators serve four-year terms in the Alaska State Senate, with half of the seats up for election every two years. The A, C, E, G, I, K, M, O, Q, and S districts are up for election.

== Predictions ==
Source	Ranking	As of
Sabato's Crystal Ball	Lean Coalition	January 22, 2026
State Navigate	Safe Coalition	October 14, 2026

== Overview ==
=== Primary election ===
Primary election – August 18, 2026
Party	Votes	%	Candidates	Advancing to general	Seats contesting
Republican	42,380	61.06%	15	14	7
Democratic	22,761	32.79%	7	7	7
Independent	4,269	6.15%	4	3	2
Totals	69,410	100.0%	26	24	—

=== General election ===
General election – November 3, 2026
Party	Candidates	Seats contesting	Seats won (Note: preliminary results as of 16 November 2026)	First preference votes	%
Republican	14	7	4	73574	
Democratic	7	7	3	40016	
Independent	3	2		4719	
Undeclared			0	2760	
Totals	24	—			100.0%

== Summary of results ==
District	2024 pres.	Incumbent	Party	Elected senator	Party
A	R +8.0	Bert Stedman	Rep	Bert Stedman	Rep
C	R +14.8	Gary Stevens†	Rep	Louise Stutes	Rep
E	R +0.1	Cathy Giessel	Rep	Cathy Giessel	Rep
G	D +11.1	Elvi Gray-Jackson	Dem	Elvi Gray-Jackson	Dem
I	D +14.6	Löki Tobin	Dem	Löki Tobin	Dem
K	D +5.5	Bill Wielechowski	Dem	Bill Wielechowski	Dem
M	R +44.4	Cathy Tilton	Rep	Ryan Berry	Rep
O	R +44.8	George Rauscher	Rep	George Rauscher	Rep
Q	R +35.0	Robert Myers Jr.	Rep	Frank Tomaszewski	Rep
S	D +2.2	Lyman Hoffman†	Dem	Bryce Edgmon	Ind

== Outgoing incumbents ==
=== Retirements ===
1. District C: Gary Stevens (R-C.) is retiring.
2. District Q: Robert Myers Jr. (R-M.) is retiring.
3. District S: Lyman Hoffman (D-C.) is retiring.

=== Resigned before end of term ===
1. District M: Shelley Hughes (R-M.) resigned on November 14, 2025, to focus on running for governor. Governor Mike Dunleavy appointed Cathy Tilton to replace her.
2. District O: Mike Shower (R-M.) resigned on November 3, 2025, to focus on running for lieutenant governor. Governor Mike Dunleavy appointed George Rauscher to replace him.

== Detailed Results ==
=== District A ===
Incumbent coalition Republican Bert Stedman is seeking re-election unopposed. After the election, Stedman announced he was unlikely to remain a member of the majority coalition in the upcoming legislature.

general election
Party	Candidate	Votes	%
Republican	Bert Stedman (incumbent)	5,851	100.0
Total votes		5,851	100.0

=== District C ===
Incumbent coalition Republican and senate president Gary Stevens has declined to seek re-election. Republican Louise Stutes, who is part of the bipartisan coalition in the State House, is running to succeed Stevens, with Stevens endorsing Stutes' campaign.

Primary election
Party	Candidate	Votes	%
Republican	Louise Stutes	4,321	49.4
Republican	Heath Smith	3,304	37.7
Republican	Carrie Harris	1,128	12.9
Total votes		8,753	100.0

=== District E ===
Incumbent coalition Republican Cathy Giessel is running for re-election.

Primary election
Party	Candidate	Votes	%
Republican	Cathy Giessel (incumbent)	5,945	62.0
Republican	Gretchen Stoddard	1,890	19.7
Republican	Leo Schafer (withdrew)	952	9.9
Republican	Jace White	798	8.3
Total votes		9,585	100.0

=== District G ===
Incumbent Democrat Elvi Gray-Jackson is seeking re-election. Nonpartisan candidate Nicholas Danger has filed to run against Gray-Jackson.

Primary election
Party	Candidate	Votes	%
Democratic	Elvi Gray-Jackson (incumbent)	4,558	69.1
Independent	Nicholas Danger	2,039	30.9
Total votes		6,597	100.0

=== District I ===
Incumbent Democrat Löki Tobin is seeking re-election unopposed.

Primary election
Party	Candidate	Votes	%
Democratic	Löki Tobin (incumbent)	3,871	100.0
Total votes		3,871	100.0

=== District K ===
Incumbent Democrat Bill Wielechowski is seeking re-election unopposed.

Primary election
Party	Candidate	Votes	%
Democratic	Bill Wielechowski (incumbent)	4,890	100.0
Total votes		4,890	100.0

=== District M ===
Incumbent Republican Cathy Tilton is running for re-election. She was first appointed on November 26, 2025, after Shelley Hughes resigned to focus on her gubernatorial campaign.

Primary election
Party	Candidate	Votes	%
Republican	Cathy Tilton (incumbent)	3,610	42.0
Democratic	Pat Chesbro	2,683	31.2
Republican	Ryan Berry	2,038	23.7
Republican	Zane Vrvilo	255	3.0
Total votes		8,586	100.0

=== District O ===
Incumbent Republican George Rauscher has filed paperwork to run for re-election. He was first appointed on November 26, 2025, after Mike Shower resigned to focus on his gubernatorial campaign.

Primary election
Party	Candidate	Votes	%
Republican	George Rauscher (incumbent)	3,524	38.8
Republican	Ryan Sheldon	2,779	30.6
Democratic	Peter Bauer	2,777	30.6
Total votes		9,080	100.0

=== District Q ===
Incumbent Republican Robert Myers Jr. is not seeking re-election.

Primary election
Party	Candidate	Votes	%
Republican	Frank Tomaszewski	5,055	60.9
Democratic	William Hunt	3,246	39.1
Total votes		8,301	100.0

=== District S ===
Incumbent coalition Democrat Lyman Hoffman has declined to seek re-election. Independent and Speaker of the Alaska House of Representatives Bryce Edgmon is running to succeed Hoffman.

Primary election
Party	Candidate	Votes	%
Independent	Bryce Edgmon	1,475	37.9
Republican	Darren Morgan Deacon	930	23.9
Democratic	WG Guy	736	18.9
Independent	Rick Robb	446	11.4
Independent	Wayne Morgan	309	7.9
Total votes		3,896	100.0
