= Alaska Senate district S =

Alaskan legislative district

Alaska's S State Senate district
Senator
Lyman Hoffman; D–Bethel
since 2003
- Population: 36,079

Alaska Senate district S is one of 20 districts of the Alaska Senate. It has been represented by Democrat Lyman Hoffman since 2003. Hoffman previously represented District M from 1991–1993 and District T from 1995–2003. District T is located in Southwest Alaska and encompasses the entirety of Alaska's 37th House of Representatives district and 38th House of Representatives district, including the Aleutian Islands, Bethel, and Bristol Bay.

== Election results (2022 boundaries) ==
=== 2022 ===
Nonpartisan primary
Party	Candidate	Votes	%
Democratic	Lyman Hoffman (incumbent)	2,386	66.2
Veterans of Alaska	Willy Keppel	1,217	33.8
Total votes		3,603	100.00

General election
Party	Candidate	Votes	%
Democratic	Lyman Hoffman (incumbent)	4,436	64.7
Veterans of Alaska	Willy Keppel	2,378	34.7
Write-in	Write-ins	40	0.6
Total votes		6,854	100.0
Democratic hold			

== Election results (2013 boundaries) ==
Map of District S of the Alaska Senate from 2013 to 2022

=== 2018 ===
Democratic primary
Party	Candidate	Votes	%
Democratic	Lyman Hoffman (incumbent)	1,968	100.0
Total votes		1,968	100

General election
Party	Candidate	Votes	%
Democratic	Lyman Hoffman (incumbent)	8,175	95.36
Write-ins	Write-ins	398	4.64
Total votes		8,573	100
Democratic hold			

=== 2014 ===
Democratic primary
Party	Candidate	Votes	%
Democratic	Lyman Hoffman (incumbent)	3,334	100.0
Total votes		3,334	100

General election
Party	Candidate	Votes	%
Democratic	Lyman Hoffman (incumbent)	8,727	96.28
Write-ins	Write-ins	337	3.72
Total votes		9,064	100
Democratic hold			

== Election results (2012 boundaries) ==
Map of District S of the Alaska Senate from 2012 to 2013

=== 2012 ===
Democratic primary
Party	Candidate	Votes	%
Democratic	Lyman Hoffman (incumbent)	1,955	100.0
Total votes		1,955	100

General election
Party	Candidate	Votes	%
Democratic	Lyman Hoffman (incumbent)	8,194	95.07
Write-ins	Write-ins	425	4.93
Total votes		8,619	100
Democratic hold			

== List of senators representing the district ==
Senators	Party	Years served	Electoral history	Area represented
Albert Adams (Kotzebue)	Democratic	1989 – January 15, 2001		
Donny Olson (Golovin)	Democratic	January 15, 2001 – January 14, 2003	Elected in 2001. Redistricted to District T.	
Lyman Hoffman (Bethel)	Democratic	January 14, 2003 – present	Redistricted from District T and re-elected in 2002. Re-elected in 2006. Re-elected in 2010. Re-elected in 2014. Re-elected in 2018. Re-elected in 2022.	Southwest Alaska
