= Alaska Senate district G =

Alaskan legislative district

Alaska's G State Senate district
Senator
Elvi Gray-Jackson; D–Anchorage
since 2023
- Population: 36,398

Alaska Senate district G is one of 20 districts of the Alaska Senate. It has been represented by Democrat Elvi Gray-Jackson since 2023. Gray-Jackson previously represented District I from 2019-2023. District G is located in Anchorage and encompasses the entirety of Alaska's 13th House of Representatives district and 14th House of Representatives district, including Spenard.

== Election results (2022 boundaries) ==
=== 2022 ===
Nonpartisan primary
Party	Candidate	Votes	%
Democratic	Elvi Gray-Jackson (incumbent)	4,552	57.5
Republican	Marcus Sanders	3,365	42.5
Total votes		7,917	100.0

General election
Party	Candidate	Votes	%
Democratic	Elvi Gray-Jackson (incumbent)	6,325	56.5
Republican	Marcus Sanders	4,832	43.1
Write-in	Write-ins	42	0.4
Total votes		11,199	100.0
Democratic hold			

== Election results (2013 boundaries) ==
Map of District G of the Alaska Senate from 2013 to 2022

=== 2018 ===
Republican primary
Party	Candidate	Votes	%
Republican	Lora Reinbold	2,807	58.21
Republican	Dan Saddler	2,015	41.79
Total votes		4,822	100

Democratic primary
Party	Candidate	Votes	%
Democratic	Oliver Schiess	1,137	100.0
Total votes		1,137	100

General election
Party	Candidate	Votes	%
Republican	Lora Reinbold	8,257	62.39
Democratic	Oliver Schiess	4,911	37.11
Write-ins	Write-ins	66	0.50
Total votes		13,234	100
Republican hold			

=== 2014 ===
Republican primary
Party	Candidate	Votes	%
Republican	Anna Fairclough (incumbent)	5,700	100.0
Total votes		5,700	100

Democratic primary
Party	Candidate	Votes	%
Democratic	Jim Arlington	1,740	100.0
Total votes		1,740	100

General election
Party	Candidate	Votes	%
Republican	Anna Fairclough (incumbent)	9,897	77.10
Democratic	Jim Arlington	2,878	22.42
Write-ins	Write-ins	61	0.48
Total votes		12,836	100
Republican hold			

== Election results (2012 boundaries) ==
Map of District G of the Alaska Senate from 2012 to 2013

=== 2012 ===
Republican primary
Party	Candidate	Votes	%
Republican	Bob Roses	2,044	100.0
Total votes		2,044	100

Democratic primary
Party	Candidate	Votes	%
Democratic	Bill Wielechowski (incumbent)	1,655	100.0
Total votes		1,655	100

2012 Alaska Senate district G election
Party	Candidate	Votes	%
Democratic	Bill Wielechowski (incumbent)	6,378	56.02
Republican	Bob Roses	4,977	43.72
Write-ins	Write-ins	30	0.26
Total votes		11,385	100
Democratic hold			
