= Shriners College Classic =

College Baseball Tournament

- Formerly: Astros College Classic (2001-02); Minute Maid Park College Classic (2003-07); Houston College Classic (2008-15)
- Sport: College baseball
- Founded: 2001
- No. of teams: 6
- Venue: Daikin Park
- Broadcasters: Space City Home Network; MLB Network
- Website: https://www.astros.com/collegeclassic

The Shriners Hospitals for Children College Classic is an annual six-team college baseball tournament held in Houston and hosted by the Astros Foundation. The 15th annual tournament was held at Minute Maid Park in March 2015. It was initially called Astros College Classic from 2001 through 2002, the Minute Maid Park College Classic from 2003 through 2007, and the Houston College Classic from 2008 through 2015. In December 2015, the Astros Foundation and Shriners Hospitals for Children announced a multi-year naming rights agreement for the tournament, rebranding the event the Shriners Hospitals for Children College Classic.

As part of the agreement with Shriners Hospitals for Children, the Astros Foundation announced that the 2016 Shriners Hospitals for Children College Classic would be nationally televised for the first time in history on MLB Network.

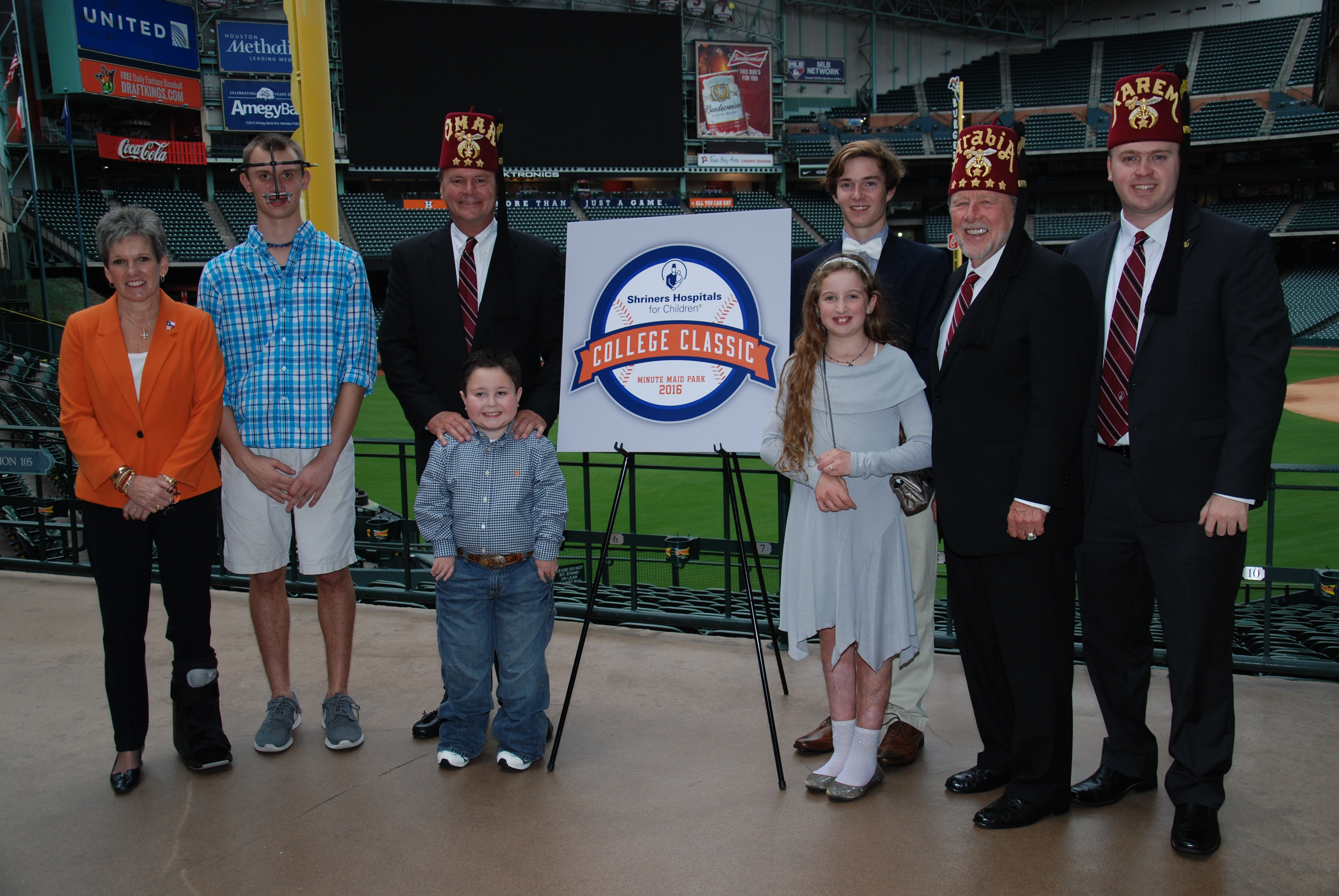
In December 2015, the Astros Foundation and Shriners Hospitals for Children announced a multi-year naming rights agreement for the Shriners Hospitals for Children College Classic at Minute Maid Park.

The College Classic is seen as the start of the college baseball season in Texas. At the end of the tournament, a Most Outstanding Player and an All-Tournament Team are announced.

The event is normally held in early March.

The 2020 edition of the event happened before the breakout of the COVID-19.

== Competitors ==
The Houston Cougars of the Big 12 and the Rice Owls of The American, who hold a rivalry, compete in the tournament annually. The other four teams invited to the tournament alternate by year.

"The intensity level is higher in practice because you know you're going to play quality people. I don't have to do much motivation to get the guys up to play three teams like this and in Minute Maid Park -- it's a major league park and guys are excited."

— Rod Delmonico, coach of the Tennessee Volunteers

Often, teams competing in the Classic are highly ranked. In 2002, the Classic involved three teams that ended the preceding season ranked in the top 25 of the Baseball Weekly/ESPN, Baseball America, and Collegiate Baseball year-end polls: the Rice Owls, Texas Tech Red Raiders, and Baylor Bears. The 2005 Classic included four top ranked teams: the #11 Baylor Bears, #13 Texas A&M Aggies, #19 Rice Owls, and #23 Oklahoma State Cowboys. Collegiate Baseball ranked all six teams competing in the 2007 Classic: they ranked the Rice Owls the top team in college baseball, and also ranked the #8 Vanderbilt Commodores, #14 Arizona State Sun Devils, #21 Baylor Bears, and #33 Houston Cougars. The Texas Longhorns and Rice Owls participated in the Classic when they won the College World Series championship in 2002 and 2003, respectively. The Texas Tech Red Raiders have appeared in the Houston College Classic seven times: in 2001, 2002, 2004, 2006, 2008, 2010, and 2012.

=== 2018 ===
For the 2018 classic, three SEC teams, Kentucky, Mississippi State, and Vanderbilt will be matched against three local universities: Houston, Sam Houston State and Louisiana. The three SEC teams played each of the three local teams once.

=== By Year ===
Year	Teams
2001	Baylor, Houston, Rice, Texas, TCU, Texas Tech
2002	Baylor, Houston, Louisiana, Rice, Texas, Texas A&M, TCU, Texas Tech
2003	Alabama, Baylor, Houston, Louisiana, Rice, Texas A&M
2004	Houston, Kansas State, Ohio State, Rice, Texas, Texas Tech
2005	Baylor, Houston, Oklahoma State, Rice, Tennessee, Texas A&M
2006	Houston, Rice, Texas, TCU, Texas Tech, Tulane
2007	Arizona State, Baylor, Houston, Rice, Texas A&M, Vanderbilt
2008	Houston, Oklahoma, Rice, Tennessee, Texas, Texas Tech
2009	Baylor, Houston, Rice, Texas A&M, UC Irvine, UCLA
2010	Houston, Missouri, Rice, Texas, TCU, Texas Tech
2011	Baylor, Houston, Kansas State, Rice, Texas A&M, Utah
2012	Arkansas, Houston, Rice, Tennessee, Texas, Texas Tech
2013	Baylor, California, Houston, North Carolina, Rice, Texas A&M
2014	Houston, Rice, Sam Houston State, Texas, TCU, Texas Tech
2015	Baylor, Hawaii, Houston, LSU, Nebraska, Texas A&M
2016	Arkansas, Houston, Louisiana, Rice, TCU, Texas Tech
2017	Baylor, LSU, Ole Miss, Texas A&M, TCU, Texas Tech
2018	Houston, Kentucky, Louisiana, Mississippi State, Sam Houston State, Vanderbilt
2019	Baylor, Houston, Rice, Texas A&M, TCU, Texas State
2020	Arkansas, Baylor, LSU, Missouri, Oklahoma, Texas
2021	Rice, Sam Houston State, Texas A&M–Corpus Christi, TCU, Texas State, Texas Tech
2022	Baylor, LSU, Oklahoma, Tennessee, Texas, UCLA
2023	Louisville, Michigan, Rice, Texas A&M, TCU, Texas Tech
2024	Houston, Louisiana, LSU, Texas, Texas State, Vanderbilt
2025	Arizona, Mississippi State, Oklahoma State, Rice, Tennessee, Texas A&M
2026	Baylor, Coastal Carolina, Ohio State, Ole Miss, Texas, UTSA

== Most Outstanding Players ==
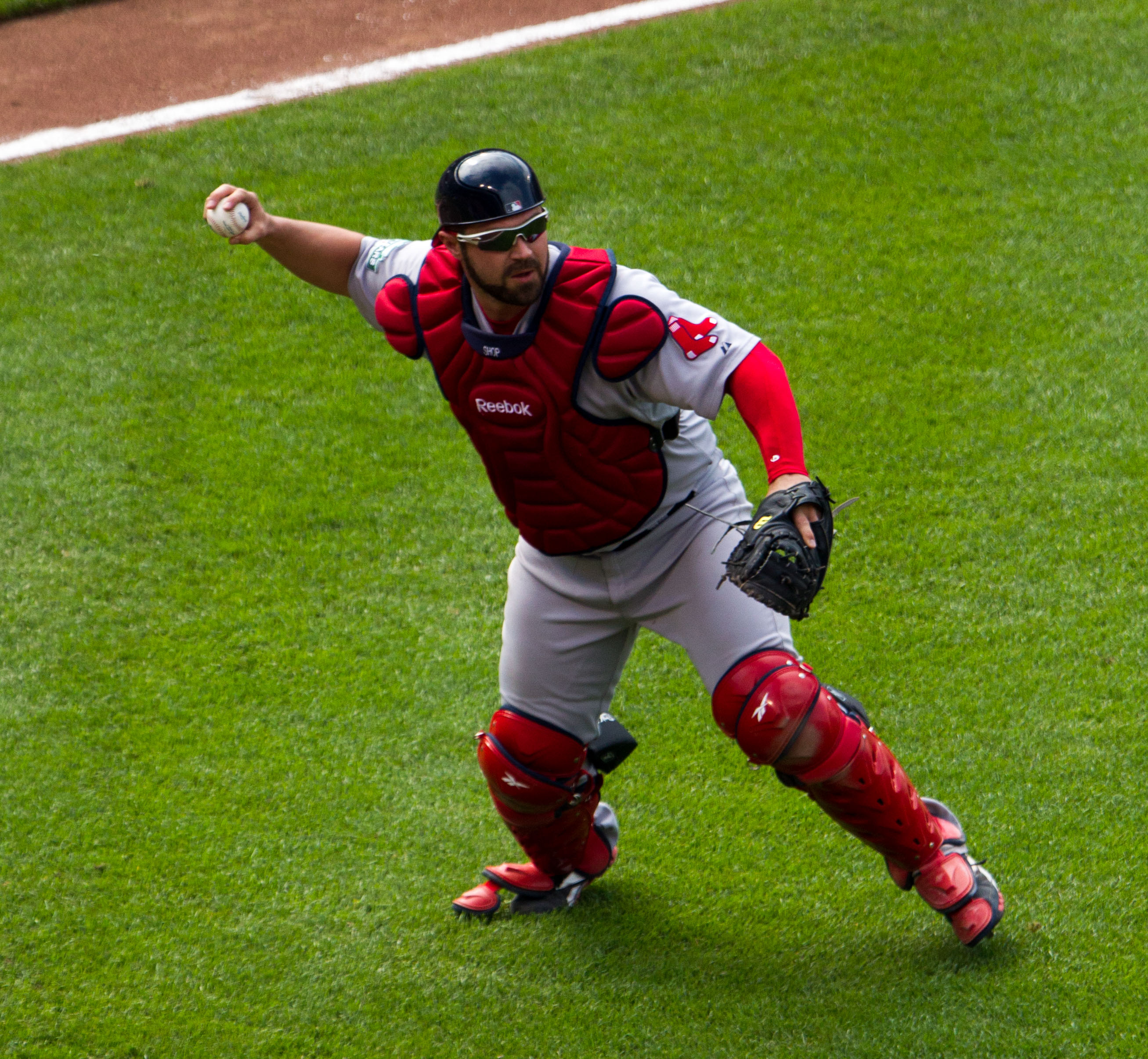
Kelly Shoppach was the tournament's first MVP

Year	Winner	Team	Position	Ref
2001	Kelly Shoppach	Baylor	Catcher	
2002	Tim Hartshorn	Baylor	Outfielder	
2003	Michael Griffin	Baylor	Outfielder	
2004	Seth Johnston	Texas	Third baseman	
2005	Josh Geer	Rice	Pitcher	
2006	Brad Lincoln	Houston	Pitcher	
2007	Matt Spencer	Arizona State	Outfielder	
2008	Diego Seastrunk	Rice	Catcher	
2009	Ryan Berry	Rice	Pitcher	
2010	Bryan Holaday	TCU	Catcher	
2011	Austin Kubitza	Rice	Pitcher	
2012	Jordan Stephens	Rice	Pitcher	
2013	Cal Towey	Baylor	Third baseman	
2014	Aaron Garza	Houston	Pitcher	
2015	Grayson Long	Texas A&M	Pitcher	
2016	Michael Bernal	Arkansas	Shortstop	
2017	Luken Baker	TCU	First baseman	
2018	Luke Heyer	Kentucky	Third baseman	
2019	Nicholas Fraze	Texas State	Pitcher	
2020	Dane Acker	Oklahoma	Pitcher	
2021	Russell Smith	TCU	Pitcher	
2022	Tyler Thomas	Baylor	Pitcher	
2023	Jack Payton	Louisville	Catcher	
2024	Chase Mora	Texas State	Second baseman	
2025	Gavin Kilen	Tennessee	Second baseman	

== Teams by number of appearances ==
Team	Appearances	Years
Houston	19	2024, 2019, 2018, 2016, 2015, 2014, 2013, 2012, 2011, 2010, 2009, 2008, 2007, 2006, 2005, 2004, 2003, 2002, 2001
Rice	19	2025, 2023, 2021, 2019, 2016, 2014, 2013, 2012, 2011, 2010, 2009, 2008, 2007, 2006, 2005, 2004, 2003, 2002, 2001
Baylor	14	2026, 2022, 2020, 2019, 2017, 2015, 2013, 2011, 2009, 2007, 2005, 2003, 2002, 2001
Texas	12	2026, 2024, 2022, 2020, 2014, 2012, 2010, 2008, 2006, 2004, 2002, 2001
Texas A&M	12	2025, 2023, 2019, 2017, 2015, 2013, 2011, 2009, 2007, 2005, 2003, 2002
Texas Tech	12	2023, 2021, 2017, 2016, 2014, 2012, 2010, 2008, 2006, 2004, 2002, 2001
TCU	10	2023, 2021, 2019, 2017, 2016, 2014, 2010, 2006, 2002, 2001
Louisiana	5	2024, 2018, 2016, 2003, 2002
LSU	5	2024, 2022, 2020, 2017, 2015
Tennessee	5	2025, 2022, 2012, 2008, 2005
Arkansas	3	2020, 2016, 2012
Oklahoma	3	2022, 2020, 2008
Sam Houston State	3	2021, 2018, 2014
Texas State	3	2024, 2021, 2019
Vanderbilt	3	2024, 2018, 2007
Kentucky	2	2018, 2011
Missouri	2	2020, 2010
UCLA	2	2022, 2009
Mississippi State	2	2025, 2018
Ohio State	2	2026, 2004
Oklahoma State	2	2025, 2005
Ole Miss	2	2026, 2017
Alabama	1	2003
Arizona	1	2025
Arizona State	1	2007
California	1	2013
Coastal Carolina	1	2026
Hawaii	1	2015
Kansas State	1	2004
Louisville	1	2023
Michigan	1	2023
Nebraska	1	2015
North Carolina	1	2013
Texas A&M–Corpus Christi	1	2021
Tulane	1	2006
UC Irvine	1	2009
Utah	1	2011
UTSA	1	2026

== See also ==
- Silver Glove series
- Liberty Bell Classic
- State Farm College Baseball Showdown
