= Alaska Senate district I =

Alaskan legislative district

Alaska's I State Senate district
Senator
Löki Tobin; D–Anchorage
since 2023
- Population: 36,226

Alaska Senate district I is one of 20 districts of the Alaska Senate. It has been represented by Democrat Löki Tobin since 2023. District I is located in Anchorage and encompasses the entirety of Alaska's 17th House of Representatives district and 18th House of Representatives district, including Downtown Anchorage, Government Hill, and Joint Base Elmendorf–Richardson.

== Election results (2022 boundaries) ==
=== 2022 ===
Nonpartisan primary
Party	Candidate	Votes	%
Democratic	Löki Tobin	3,435	68.0
Independent	Heather Herndon	1,615	32.0
Total votes		5,050	100.0

General election
Party	Candidate	Votes	%
Democratic	Löki Tobin	5,011	66.4
Independent	Heather Herndon	2,428	32.2
Write-in	Write-ins	105	1.4
Total votes		7,544	100.0
Democratic hold			

== Election results (2013 boundaries) ==
Map of District I of the Alaska Senate from 2013 to 2022

=== 2018 ===
Republican primary
Party	Candidate	Votes	%
Republican	Jim Crawford	1,709	100.0
Total votes		1,709	100

Democratic primary
Party	Candidate	Votes	%
Democratic	Elvi Gray-Jackson	2,141	100.0
Total votes		2,141	100

General election
Party	Candidate	Votes	%
Democratic	Elvi Gray-Jackson	6,724	59.90
Republican	Jim Crawford	4,462	39.75
Write-ins	Write-ins	39	0.35
Total votes		11,225	100
Democratic hold			

=== 2014 ===
Democratic primary
Party	Candidate	Votes	%
Democratic	Berta Gardner (incumbent)	3,426	100.0
Total votes		3,426	100

General election
Party	Candidate	Votes	%
Democratic	Berta Gardner (incumbent)	8,769	92.76
Write-ins	Write-ins	684	7.24
Total votes		9,453	100
Democratic hold			

== Election results (2012 boundaries) ==
Map of District I of the Alaska Senate from 2012 to 2013

=== 2012 ===
Republican primary
Party	Candidate	Votes	%
Republican	Paul Kendall	1,294	100.0
Total votes		1,294	100

Democratic primary
Party	Candidate	Votes	%
Democratic	Johnny Ellis (incumbent)	2,498	100.0
Total votes		2,498	100

General election
Party	Candidate	Votes	%
Democratic	Johnny Ellis (incumbent)	6,818	67.87
Republican	Paul Kendall	3,190	31.75
Write-ins	Write-ins	38	0.38
Total votes		10,046	100
Democratic hold			
