= Senator Begich (disambiguation) =

Mark Begich (born 1962) is a former United States Senator from Alaska. Senator Begich may also refer to:

- Nick Begich Sr. (1932–1972), member of the Alaska State Senate, father of the United States Senator
- Tom Begich (born 1960), member of the Alaska State Senate, brother of the United States Senator
