= Daikin Park =

Baseball stadium in Houston, Texas

- The Ice Box

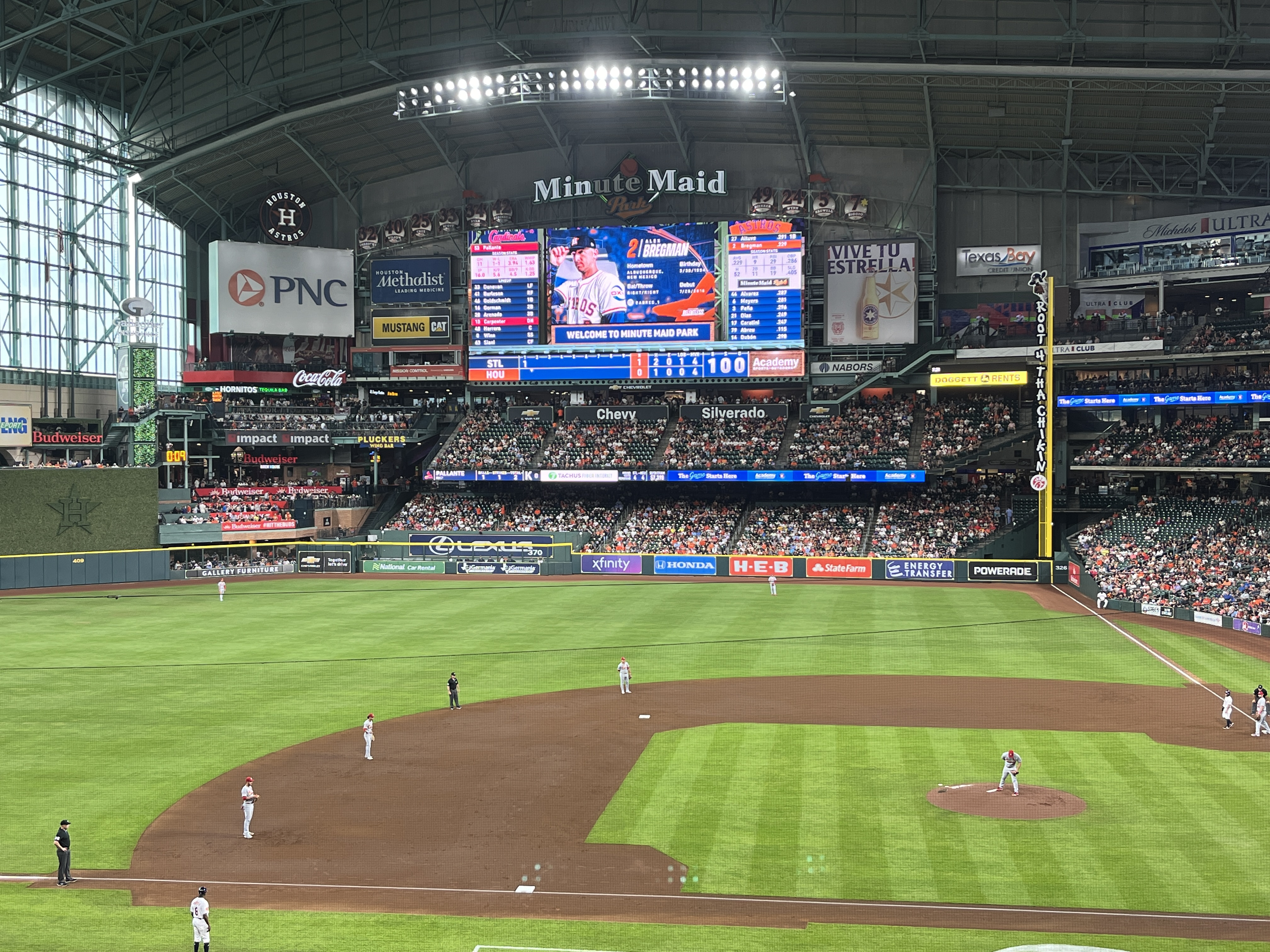
- Daikin Park (as Minute Maid Park) in 2024

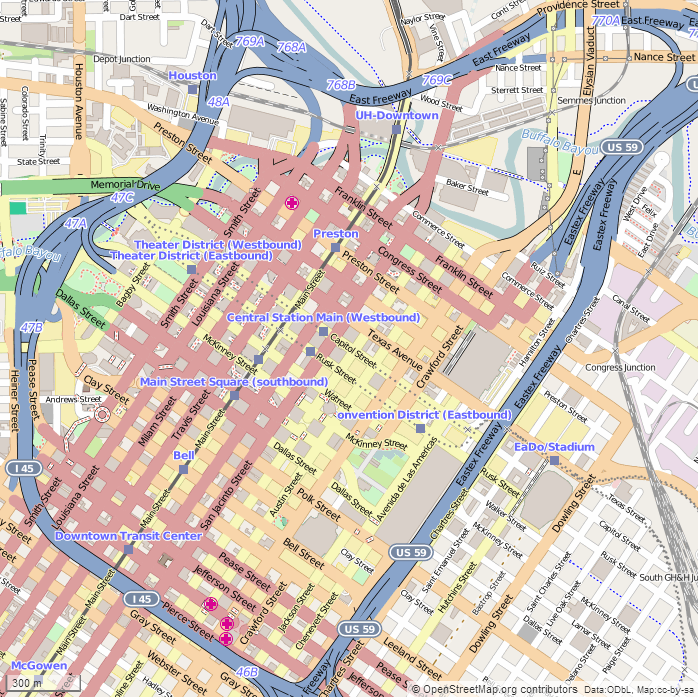
- Location in Houston Location in Texas Location in the United States
- Former names: The Ballpark at Union Station (planning phase); Enron Field (2000–2002); Astros Field (February–July 2002); Minute Maid Park (July 2002–2024)
- Address: 501 Crawford Street
- Location: Houston, Texas, U.S.
- Coordinates: 29°45′25″N 95°21′20″W
- Owner: Harris County-Houston Sports Authority
- Operator: Harris County-Houston Sports Authority
- Capacity: 41,168 (2017–present); 41,676 (2016); 41,574 (2015); 42,060 (2013–2014); 40,981 (2012); 40,963 (2011); 40,976 (2006–2010); 40,950 (2000–2005)
- Roof: Retractable
- Surface: Platinum TE Paspalum (grass)
- Scoreboard: 54 feet (16.5 m) high by 124 feet (37.8 m) wide
- Record attendance: 44,203, September 26, 2001
- Field size: Left field – 315 feet (96.0 m); Left-center – 366 feet (111.6 m); Left-center (deep) – 399 feet (121.6 m); Center field – 409 feet (124.7 m); Right-center (deep) 408 feet (124.4 m); Right-center – 370 feet (112.8 m); Right field – 326 feet (99.4 m); Backstop – 49 feet (15 m)
- Public transit: METRORail: (at Convention District); METRO bus: 3, 6, 11, 20, 30, 37, 48, 50, 77, 137, 163, 236, 255, 256, 257
- Parking: Estimated 25,000 total spots within walking distance

Construction
- Groundbreaking: November 1, 1997
- Opened: March 30, 2000; 26 years ago (exhibition); April 7, 2000; 26 years ago (regular season)
- Renovated: 2010 (offseason), 2017 (offseason)
- Cost: US$250 million ($467 million in 2025 dollars)
- Architects: HOK Sport; Molina & Associates
- Project managers: Schindewolfe and Associates
- Structural engineer: Walter P Moore
- Services engineers: M-E Engineers, Inc. (Bowl); Uni-Systems, Inc. (Roof)
- General contractor: Brown & Root/Barton Malow/Empire Joint Venture

Tenant
- Houston Astros (MLB) (2000–present)

Website
- mlb.com/astros/ballpark

Daikin Park (originally Enron Field and formerly Astros Field and Minute Maid Park) is a retractable roof stadium in Houston, Texas, United States. It opened in 2000 and is the home ballpark of the Houston Astros of Major League Baseball (MLB). The ballpark has a seating capacity of 41,168, which includes 5,197 club seats and 63 luxury suites, with a natural grass playing field. It was built as a replacement for the Astrodome, the first domed baseball/football stadium, which opened in 1965.

== History ==
Former logo of Minute Maid Park

=== Union Station and pre-ballpark era ===
In 1909, during the time when West End Park was Houston's premier residential area, the Houston Belt and Terminal Railway Company commissioned the design of a new union station for the city from New York City–based architects Warren and Wetmore. The location called for the demolition of several structures of Houston prominence. Horace Baldwin Rice's residence and Adath Yeshurun Congregation's synagogue among other structures were removed.

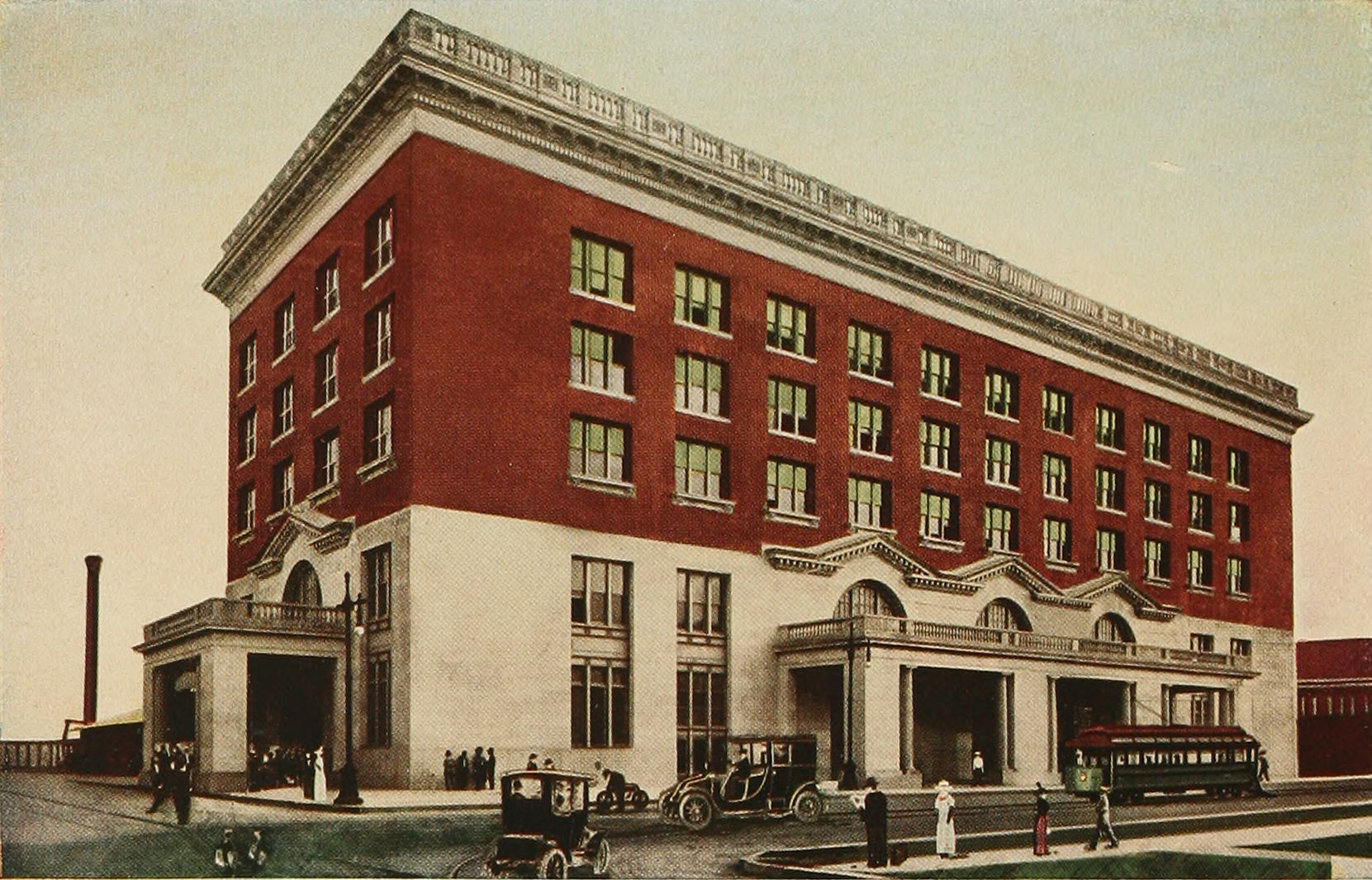
An illustration of Union Station, 1913

With an original estimated cost of US$1 million, Union Station was constructed by the American Construction Company for an eventual total of five times that amount. Exterior walls were constructed of granite, limestone, and terracotta, while the interior used an extensive amount of marble. It was completed and opened on March 1, 1911. At the time, Houston, with 17 railways, was considered the main railroad hub of the Southern United States. This is also evident by the Seal of Houston, which prominently features a locomotive. Two more floors were added the following year.

The station served as the main inter-city passenger terminal for Houston for over seven decades thereafter. Passenger rail declined greatly after World War II, and the last regularly scheduled train, the Lone Star, moved its service to Houston's current Amtrak station on July 31, 1974. With this move, the building became only office space for the HB&T as well as the Missouri Pacific Railroad. On November 10, 1977, the building was added to the National Register of Historic Places by the National Park Service.

=== Planning and funding ===
In August 1995, Astros owner Drayton McLane, then leasing the Astrodome from Harris County, commented to the Houston Chronicle that he was not in the market for a new ballpark. In reference to Pittsburgh's Three Rivers Stadium and Cincinnati's Riverfront Stadium, McLane noted, "... I remember when those were built in the 1970s and those were as good a stadiums as there were. They were the most modern stadiums in the world, and now they're saying they're all bad. That they can't make a go of it without a new stadium. It helps, but there are other things involved."

Later in 1995, Houston's NFL franchise and joint-tenant of the Astrodome, the Houston Oilers, announced they were leaving for Nashville in order to have a new stadium built for the team there. Citing a lack of adequate luxury boxes, in October, Astros vice-president Bob McClaren claimed that renovations to the Astrodome would help increase revenue. Drayton McLane pointed toward Astrodome renovations as necessary, saying, "It's 30 years old and not a lot of money has been spent to remodel it." According to the organization, the team was in danger of being sold to a Virginia businessman who was expected to move the Astros to the Washington D.C. area because of poor revenue.

In June 1996, University of Houston alumnus, BMC Software and San Diego Padres owner, John J. Moores, who wanted to own the next NFL franchise in Houston, met with Texas State Senator Mario Gallegos, Jr., and other local Hispanic leaders in regard to the future of a football-only Astrodome and a new baseball-only ballpark in downtown Houston. Meanwhile, Harris County Judge Robert Eckels pieced together a plan to build a new ballpark next to the Astrodome in the Astrodomain. The Astros echoed the Astrodomain location sentiment because they believed construction time would be shorter. Eckels, who convinced then Mayor Bob Lanier of the lack of viability for the ballpark in a downtown location, was quoted as saying, "They keep telling me about these miracles in other cities, but it doesn't work in Houston [...] If we are going to put this stadium some place, let's stick with a proven place." This plan was considered to be nearly finalized when the Astros and Harris County agreed to a US$250 million county-funded stadium whose overrun costs would be funded by the Astros.

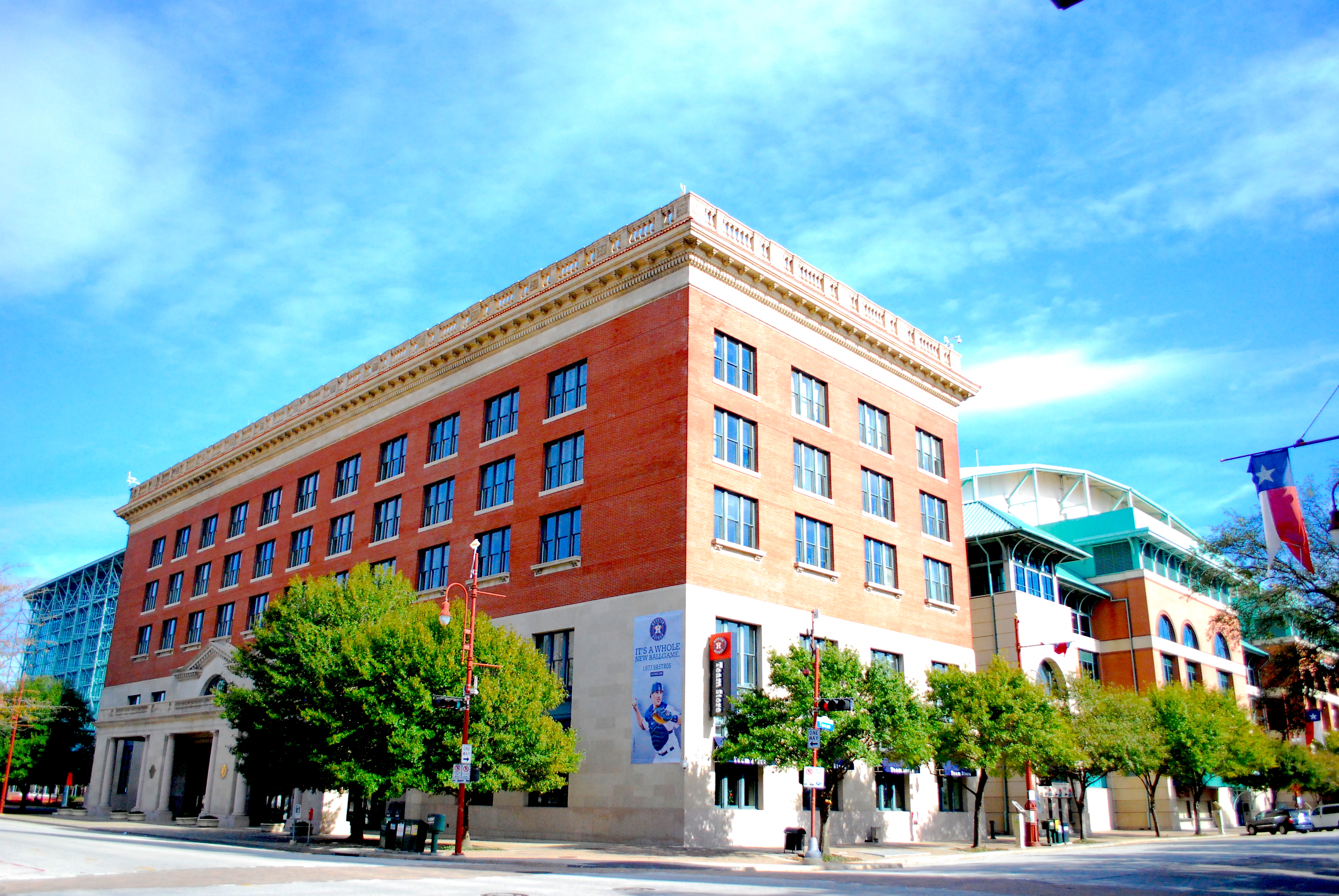
Exterior of Daikin Park at the intersection of Crawford Street and Texas Avenue

In August 1996, Houston's Union Station received a US$2 million grant from the Texas Transportation Commission for renovation in a separate project. Plans for the new ballpark's location drastically changed by September mostly in response to Enron Chairman Kenneth Lay's input and pledge to substantially contribute to funding if placed downtown. It was at this time where the Union Station location was proposed by Lay. Upon an agreement among all of the leadership entities, the idea of a retractable roof stadium was confirmed for the new ballpark. A November referendum was planned for Harris County residents to approve the deal.

The Harris County referendum that took place on November 5, 1996, to help fund the ballpark passed by a narrow margin of 51% to 49%. In response to the referendum, during the 75th Texas Legislature Texas State Senator John Whitmire of Houston sponsored a bill supported by five of the six area Harris County senators that would create the Harris County-Houston Sports Authority. With companion House Bill 92 authored by Houston-born Representative Kim Brimer voted upon and adopted by both chambers, the authorization for creation of a sports authority was approved. It was signed into law by Governor George W. Bush on June 2, 1997. The Harris County-Houston Sports Authority would assist in financing for the new ballpark as well as allow for renovation of the Astrodome by allowing for special county-wide taxation of rental cars, tickets, parking, and hotel use.

In June 1997, with the ability to create a sports authority signed into law, concurrent votes of the Harris County Commissioners' Court and the Houston City Council to establish the Harris County-Houston Sports Authority on effective September 1, 1997. Its chairman and 12 other directors were jointly appointed by the Mayor of Houston and Harris County Judge. The institution remains in existence today.

The ballpark was named "Enron Field" after a $100 million, 30-year naming rights deal was made with Enron on April 7, 1999. After the Enron scandal of 2001, the Astros and the now-bankrupt Enron came to an agreement to end the deal and rename the stadium in February 2002.

=== Design and construction ===
Early stadium sketches from Kansas City-based HOK Sport (now Populous) using the working title "The Ballpark at Union Station" were released to the public on October 11, 1996, where Astros President Tal Smith was open about his suggestions for the stadium including the location of the flagpole in center field and a traditional dirt path from the pitcher's mound to home plate. While the dirt path was not implemented, the flagpole idea became known as "Tal's Hill" and remained a signature feature of the ballpark until 2016.

The design of the new park integrated the former Union Station building's main concourse, reutilizing the space for a clubhouse, cafe, team store, and office space. A large model train was also included within the park's design as an homage to the station.

In late 1997, it was announced that local Brown & Root would manage construction of the stadium, while Populous with Walter P. Moore would design it. The electrification of the park's retractable roof was developed by VAHLE, Inc.

Groundbreaking for Enron Field was on October 30, 1997. Its groundbreaking ceremony was attended by Enron CEO Kenneth Lay, Houston Mayor Bob Lanier, Astros owner Drayton McLane, Harris County Judge Robert Eckles, Harris County Commissioner El Franco Lee, and Harris County-Houston Sports Authority Chairman Jack Rains.

Statues of longtime Astros players Jeff Bagwell and Craig Biggio are located in the exterior of the ballpark in a plaza area. The two former teammates are depicted playing baseball with each other. The plaza also displays pennants for all Astros division and league championships, as well as their World Series titles. There are also several plaques to commemorate notable Astros and their achievements.

=== Opening and current use ===
The ballpark was first inaugurated with a preseason game against the New York Yankees on March 30, 2000, with naming rights sold to the Houston energy and financial trading company Enron in a 30-year, $100 million deal. However, Astros management faced a public relations problem when the energy corporation went bankrupt in 2001 due to a financial scandal. Quickly wanting to distance themselves from Enron, Astros ownership asked to prematurely end naming rights, but Enron refused. On February 5, 2002, Astros ownership filed a motion with the court overseeing the company's bankruptcy to force Enron to make an immediate decision on the matter. By February 27, the two entities agreed to end the naming rights, and settled with the Astros paying $2.1 million to Enron. Without a naming rights agreement in place, the ballpark became officially known as "Astros Field".

The Astros sold naming rights of the ballpark in 2002 to locally based Coca-Cola subsidiary Minute Maid for $100 million over 30 years. Its official name was then changed to "Minute Maid Park".

On January 1, 2025, the stadium was renamed to Daikin Park after Japanese conglomerate Daikin, which owns Waller-based air conditioning manufacturer Goodman Global, agreed to acquire the stadium's naming rights. The agreement is seen to run through 2039.

=== Alterations ===
In 2004, the Astros launched Wi-Fi throughout the ballpark, allowing fans to use the Internet while attending a game for a fee. In addition, the ballpark was the first major sports facility to use a separate video board exclusively for closed captioning for the hearing impaired of PA system and video board content, rather than appearing along the bottom of the main board.

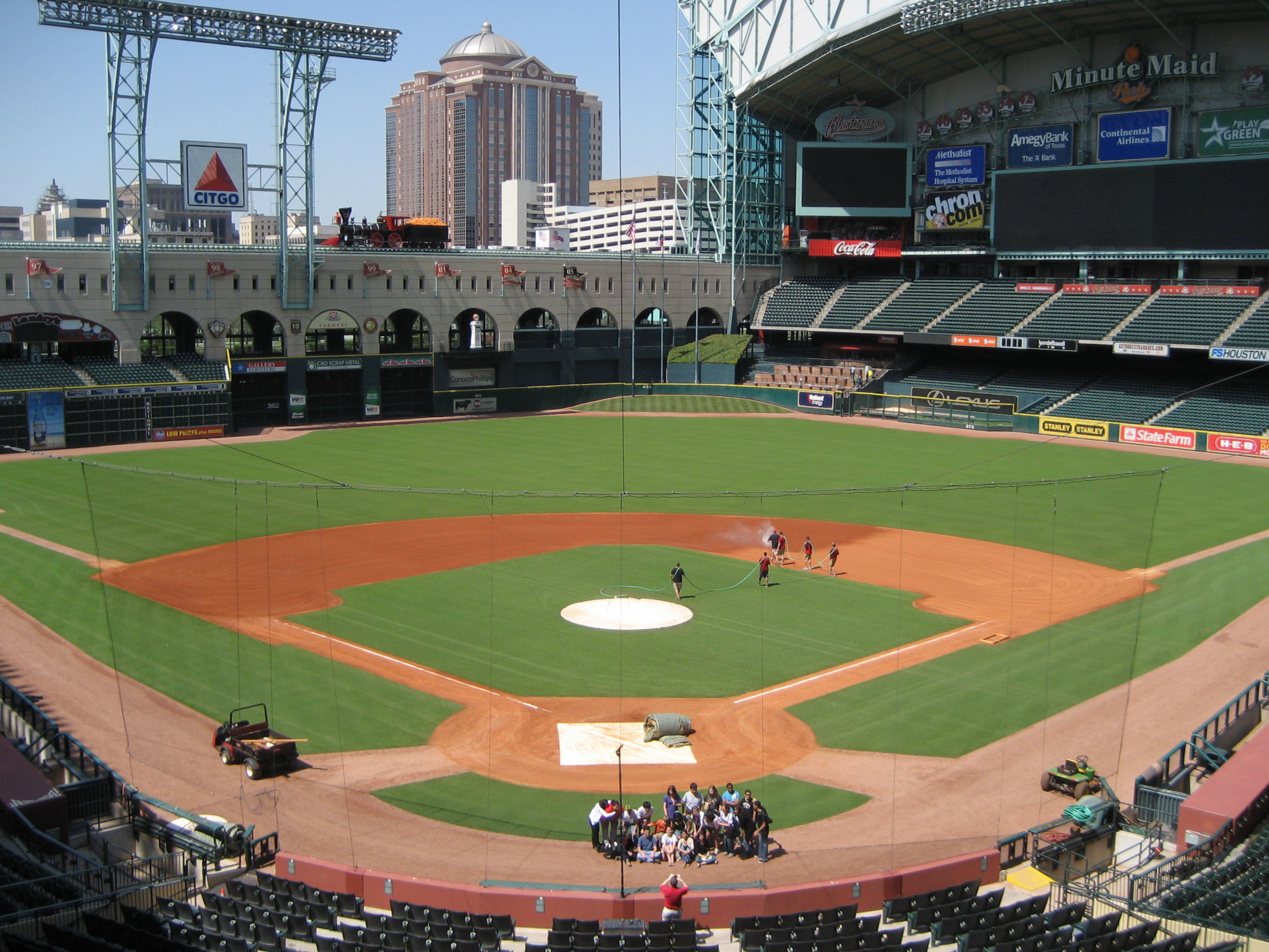
The ballpark in 2010, prior to its 2011 right field alterations

In 2006, the Chick-fil-A cows were unveiled on the foul poles, saying EAT MOR FOWL, and the cows have Astros caps on. If an Astros player hits the pole, all fans in attendance get a coupon for a free chicken sandwich from Chick-fil-A. Hunter Pence is the first and second Astros player to ever hit the left field "Fowl Pole" when he did it twice in the 2007 season. Ty Wigginton became the third Astro to hit the left field pole on September 16, 2007. Kazuo Matsui hit the right field foul pole on August 3, 2009, with a two-run homer in the sixth inning to beat the Giants. Carlos Lee hit the left field pole on July 28, 2010, giving the Astros an 8–1 win against the Cubs. Two days later, Jeff Keppinger hit the left field pole to help the Astros win, 5–0, against the Brewers. In the 2023 Major League Baseball postseason (October 7th, 2023), Yordan Alvarez hit a solo home run to the right field pole which made the game 6-4.

After the 2008 season, the Astros' groundskeepers began installing 2.3 acres (9,300 m^{2}) of a new turfgrass playing surface at Minute Maid Park. The Astros also became one of the first to use the new Chemgrass, later known as AstroTurf after its first well-publicized use at the Houston Astrodome in 1966.

In honor of longtime Astros broadcaster Milo Hamilton, the City of Houston officially renamed a portion of the Ballpark District to the "Hall of Fame District", and the portion of Hamilton Avenue that runs within that district to "Milo Hamilton Way" on April 8, 2009.

For the 2011 season, the park added a large Daktronics HD screen nicknamed "El Grande" replacing the original one in right field. At 54 feet (16 m) high and 124 feet (38 m) wide, it is the fourth largest scoreboard in Major League Baseball, behind T-Mobile Park (home of the Seattle Mariners), Progressive Field (home of the Cleveland Guardians), and Kaufmann Stadium (home of the Kansas City Royals). The old screen was taken out and replaced by billboards. Additionally, a smaller HD screen was added on the far left field wall. The ring of advertisement screens around the park were replaced in favor of HD ribbon boards.

After the Astros reverted to their original colors and logo in 2013, much of Minute Maid Park was repainted to navy and orange from brick red. Signs with the previous logo and colors were also replaced. More than 4,500 US gallons (17,000 L) of paint were used and over 1,000 signs were replaced.

In June 2015 the Astros announced Tal's Hill would be removed in a major renovation project during the 2015-2016 offseason, to be replaced with additional seating, concessions, and escalators for fans. This would result in center field dimensions of 436 feet (then the longest in MLB) being reduced to 409 feet. In addition, seating sections 256, 257, and 258 in the outfield mezzanine would be removed. However, the project had to be postponed due to the Astros' unexpected American League Wild Card championship and subsequent postseason appearance, along with the stadium's offseason event schedule. The renovation was completed during the 2016-2017 offseason. The flagpoles became out of play.

In April 2022, Daikin Park, then Minute Maid Park, received Amazon's "Just Walk Out" technology for two of its concession stands, becoming the first MLB stadium to incorporate cashierless stores.

=== Major events ===
- On October 9, 2005, Minute Maid Park hosted the then-longest postseason game in Major League Baseball history, both in terms of time and number of innings. The Astros defeated the Atlanta Braves 7–6 in a game lasting 18 innings, which took 5 hours and 50 minutes to play. The time record was beaten by Game 3 of the 2018 World Series, which went 18 innings and lasted 7 hours and 20 minutes.
- On October 25, 2005, Minute Maid Park hosted the first World Series game ever played in Texas, and the longest World Series game ever played, which the Astros lost to the eventual World Series champion Chicago White Sox 7–5 in 14 innings; this game lasted 5 hours and 41 minutes. The following night, the White Sox won their third title—and first in 88 years—at Minute Maid Park.
- On September 30, 2007, in Craig Biggio's last game of his career, Minute Maid Park hit the highest attendance in its 8-year history by selling 43,823 tickets, 107% of its capacity.
- On April 5, 2010, Opening Day of 2010, Minute Maid Park surpassed its highest attendance total once again by selling 43,836 tickets, 13 more tickets than its previous record.
- The Astros transferred to the American League for the 2013 season, resulting in the designated hitter rule coming into effect at Minute Maid Park. The last pitcher to bat at an MLB game in Houston was Astros pitcher Bud Norris until May 11, 2021, when Shohei Ohtani of the Los Angeles Angels started on the mound and batted second in the lineup.
- In his third start as an Astro, pitcher Mike Fiers threw the stadium's first no-hitter in a 3–0 victory over the Los Angeles Dodgers on August 21, 2015.
- In late October 2017 the Astros hosted three World Series games against the Los Angeles Dodgers. The Astros would go on to win the 2017 World Series, winning 2 of 3 games in Houston and 2 of 4 games in Los Angeles.
- In late October 2019, the Astros hosted four games of the World Series versus the Washington Nationals. While the Astros won all three away games, they lost all four games played at Minute Maid Park.
- It was one of two hosts (Globe Life Field being the other) for the 2020 NLDS. Atlanta swept Miami 3–0 to advance to the NLCS.
- Three games of the 2021 World Series were held at Minute Maid Park, with the Braves winning Games 1 and 6 (they also won Games 3 and 4 at Truist Park in Atlanta) to claim their fourth World Series championship. Houston's only home victory came in Game 2.
- Games 1, 2 and 6 of the 2022 World Series were held at Minute Maid Park. The Astros won their second World Series championship in Game 6, marking the third time a World Series championship was hoisted at the park and the first time the Astros won on their home field. Houston also won Game 2, as well as two of three games at Citizens Bank Park against the Philadelphia Phillies.
- All games in Pool B and two quarterfinal games of the 2026 World Baseball Classic took place at the stadium.

== Non-baseball events ==
=== Soccer ===
While primarily a baseball venue, Daikin Park can adequately host sports such as soccer and both codes of rugby. The venue can also play host to large-scale music concerts. It is not large enough to comfortably accommodate American football. However, the opening of BBVA Compass Stadium four blocks southeast on Texas Avenue for MLS's Houston Dynamo FC in 2012 has effectively made its use for future soccer games moot.

Its debut as a soccer venue happened during the 2006 edition of the CONCACAF Champions Cup. The stadium hosted the first leg of the quarterfinal between Portmore United F.C. of Jamaica (the "home" team) and Club América of Mexico.

Date	Winning team	Result	Losing team	Tournament	Spectators
February 22, 2006	(Mexico) Club América	2–1	(Jamaica) Portmore United F.C.	2006 CONCACAF Champions' Cup Quarterfinal	12,988

=== Professional wrestling ===
Minute Maid Park hosted the 2020 WWE Royal Rumble on January 26, one of WWE's four annual flagship professional wrestling events. This was the first time it has hosted a WWE pay-per-view event. The venue is scheduled to host 2026 WWE Survivor Series: WarGames on November 28, another one of the promotion's four annual flagship professional wrestling events.

=== Concerts ===
Paul McCartney, RBD, Jay-Z, Beyoncé, Taylor Swift, Eagles, Madonna, Bad Bunny, Lady Gaga and Red Hot Chili Peppers have all performed at Daikin Park.

Date	Artist	Opening act(s)	Tour / concert name	Attendance	Revenue	Notes
April 21, 2007	Jimmy Buffett	Robert Earl Keen	Bama Breeze Tour	—	—	Sonny Landreth was a guest. Michael Utley was not at the show due to minor surgery. Mac McAnally filled in on keyboards.
November 16, 2008	Madonna	Paul Oakenfold	Sticky & Sweet Tour	41,498 / 41,498	$5,170,100	
November 5, 2011	Taylor Swift	Needtobreathe; David Nail; Adam Brand	Speak Now World Tour	42,095 / 42,095	$3,435,756	Nelly was the special guest.
November 14, 2012	Paul McCartney	DJ Chris	On the Run Tour	38,036 / 38,036	$4,478,038	
July 18, 2014	Beyoncé; Jay-Z	—	On the Run Tour	40,103 / 40,103	$5,235,438	
September 9, 2015	Taylor Swift	Vance Joy; Shawn Mendes	The 1989 World Tour	40,122 / 40,122	$5,202,196	Originally planned to take place on October 13, but was moved backwards to avoid any potential scheduling conflict with the Houston Astros potentially making the 2015 Major League Baseball postseason. Wiz Khalifa was the special guest.
June 15, 2018	The Eagles	Chris Stapleton	North American Tour 2018	—	—	
November 3, 2018	Ed Sheeran	Snow Patrol; Lauv	÷ Tour	39,354 / 39,354	$3,985,595	
July 29, 2021	Green Day; Fall Out Boy; Weezer	The Interrupters	Hella Mega Tour	31,182 / 36,785	$2,852,741	
August 19, 2022	Def Leppard; Mötley Crüe	Poison; Joan Jett; Classless Act	The Stadium Tour	39,247 / 39,247	$5,435,060	
September 1, 2022	Bad Bunny	Alesso	World's Hottest Tour	83,518 / 83,518	$19,557,149	
September 2, 2022	Bad Bunny	Alesso	World's Hottest Tour	83,518 / 83,518	$19,557,149	
September 13, 2022	Lady Gaga	—	The Chromatica Ball	33,779 / 33,779	$4,004,039	
September 23, 2022	Billy Joel	—	Billy Joel In Concert	—	—	
May 25, 2023	Red Hot Chili Peppers	The Strokes; Thundercat	Global Stadium Tour	—	—	
June 24, 2023	Romeo Santos	—	Fórmula, Vol. 3: La Gira	—	—	
August 27, 2023	RBD	—	Soy Rebelde Tour	41,100 / 41,100	$9,991,784	
September 27, 2023	P!nk	Grouplove; KidCutUp; Brandi Carlile	Summer Carnival	40,093 / 40,093	$4,786,791	
September 28, 2023	Guns N' Roses	Alice In Chains	Guns N' Roses 2023 Tour	—	—	
November 18, 2023	Morgan Wallen	Hardy; Ernest; Bailey Zimmerman	One Night At A Time World Tour	—	—	Rescheduled from May 26, 2023 for health reasons.
August 14, 2024	Def Leppard; Journey	Steve Miller Band	The Summer Stadium Tour	—	—	
August 24, 2024	Chris Stapleton	Miranda Lambert; Grace Potter	Chris Stapleton's All-American Road Show Tour	—	—	
September 8, 2025	Chris Brown	Summer Walker; Bryson Tiller	Breezy Bowl XX Tour	40,340 / 40,340	$8,273,801	
August 6, 2027	Slipknot	Bring Me The Horizon; Polyphia	(sic)est Stadium Tour	/		

=== TV ===
The nationally syndicated TV talk show Rachael Ray held a mass wedding at the park following Hurricane Ike for 40 couples who were unable to get married after a company they paid to hold the weddings went bankrupt. Comedian Jeffrey Ross served as best man for all 40 couples. The ceremony was aired as part of a special episode of the talk show on November 21, 2008.

=== Other events ===
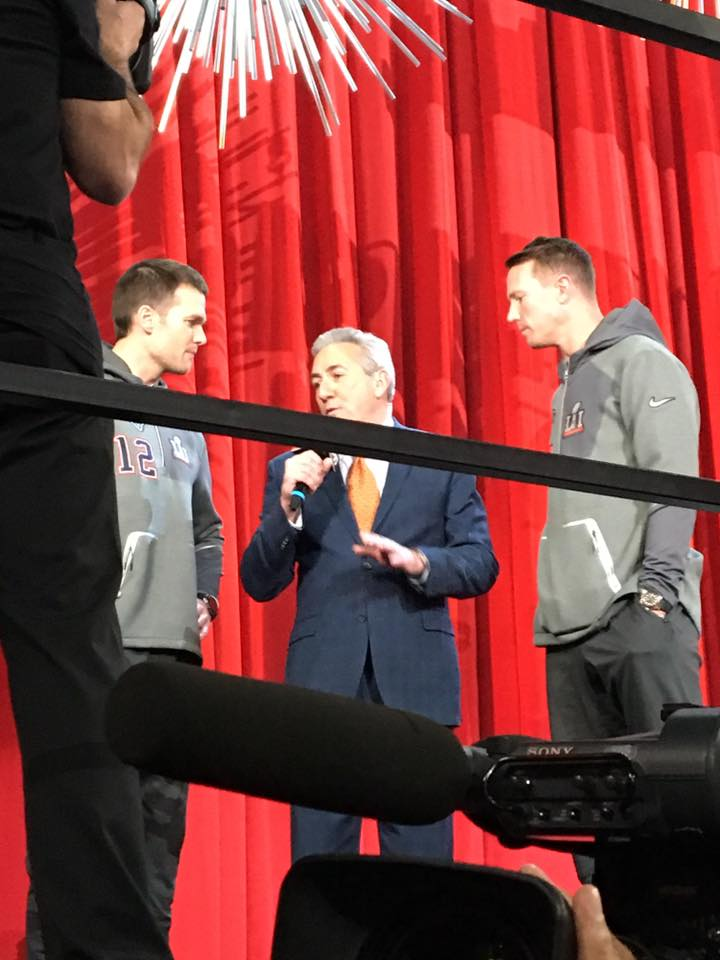
ESPN's Sal Paolantonio talking to Tom Brady and Matt Ryan at Super Bowl LI Opening Night

The stadium also is the host of the Houston College Classic college baseball tournament, part of the winter fan festival held in February. The tournament features local schools the University of Houston and Rice University every year, a pair of major conference schools, alternating between Big 12 members Texas Tech University and Baylor University and SEC members University of Texas at Austin and Texas A&M University, as well as two other teams from around the country.

On May 9, 2015, Canelo Alvarez fought James Kirkland in the first boxing match fought in the stadium. Alvarez defeated Kirkland via knockout in the third round.

The University of Houston–Downtown also holds their commencement ceremony in Daikin Park.

Minute Maid Park hosted a cricket match on November 11, 2015, the second in a series of three Cricket All-Stars matches played by retired greats of the game. Shane Warne's Warne's Warriors clinched the series 2–0. Keeping with the naming conventions from the previous match at Minute Maid Park, the ends were named after Nolan Ryan and José Cruz, two players that have their numbers retired by the Astros.

On January 30, 2017, the stadium hosted Super Bowl Opening Night for Super Bowl LI at nearby NRG Stadium.

From 2017 until 2020, the park hosted the final rounds of the Houston leg of the FIRST Championship. To avoid damaging the field while the Astros were in season, the competition fields were built on a stage over the infield dirt between first and third base.

== Features ==
=== Tal's Hill ===
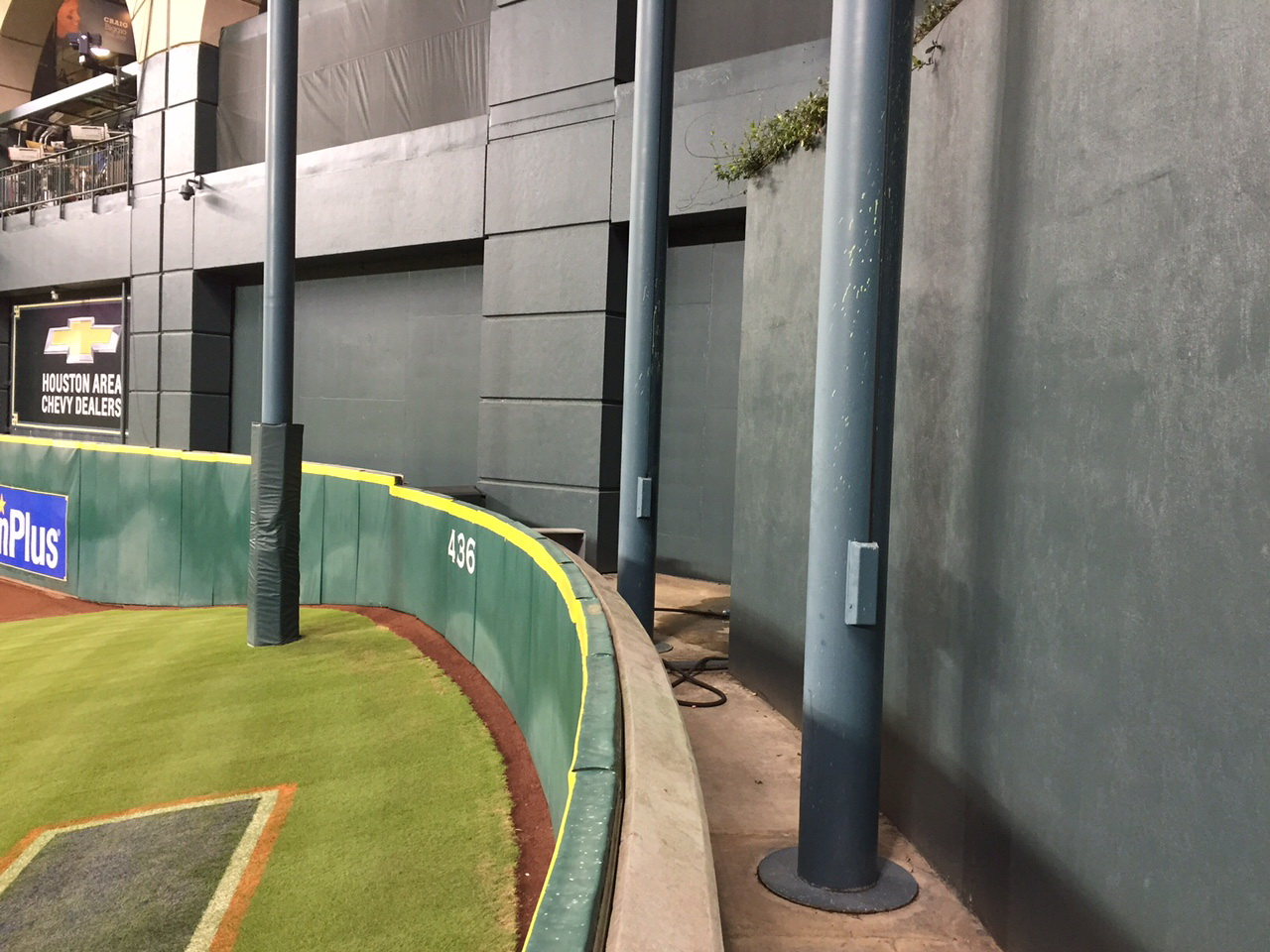
Tal's Hill and the flagpole

Until 2017, center field featured a 90-foot (27 m) wide incline called Tal's Hill, named for former team president Tal Smith. The incline was inspired by similar features that used to exist at Crosley Field and Fenway Park. There was a flagpole in play on the incline, an element inspired by Yankee Stadium before its remodeling in the mid-'70s, and Tiger Stadium as well. Milwaukee Brewers player Richie Sexson once hit a ball off the flagpole. There was a mark there until the 2011 season, when the pole was repainted. The hill and the flagpole were scheduled to be removed following the 2015 season, but remained in place due to an unexpected playoff run.

While Crosley Field's infamous left field terrace, which was half as steep (only 15°) as Tal's Hill (30°), was a natural feature of the site on which the park was located, Tal's Hill was purely decorative. On June 4, 2015, the Astros announced that they would be removing Tal's Hill as part of a $15 million renovation for the 2016 season. The center field fence was to be moved in from 436 feet (133 m) (which from 2000 to 2016 was the longest in baseball) to 409 feet (125 m) from home plate, but the center field renovations were delayed until after the 2016 season, due at least in part to the 2015 playoffs cutting into planned construction time.

=== Union Station ===
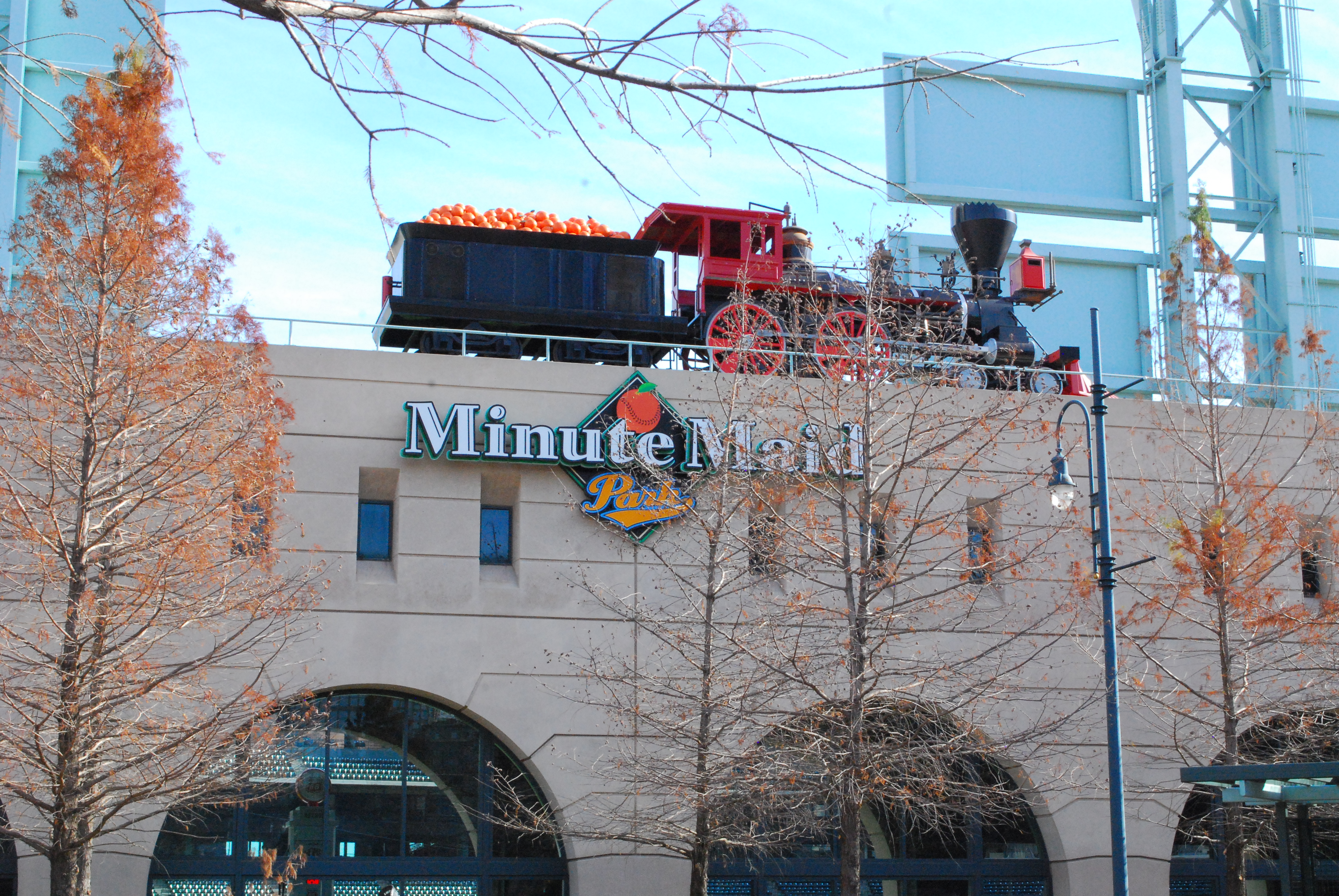
Daikin Park's 4-4-0 locomotive is visible from the exterior of the ballpark.

The largest entrance to the park is inside what was once Houston's Union Station, and the left-field side of the stadium features a railway as homage to the site's history. The train moves along an 800-foot (240 m) length of track on top of the length of the exterior wall beyond left field when the Astros take the field during the first inning, when an Astros player hits a home run, and when the Astros win a game. It is driven by Bobby Vásquez, who goes by the name Bobby Dynamite. The train is an upscaled replica of the General 4-4-0 and is pulled by a cable which is operated by the driver. The engine's tender used to be filled with giant oranges in reference to Minute Maid's most famous product, orange juice, but now features giant baseballs when Daikin's naming rights started in 2025. Prior to Minute Maid buying the stadium's naming rights, the tender was filled with logs.

In a challenge to home run hitters, former Astros owner Drayton McLane's office window, located in the old Union Station and directly above the Crawford Boxes, is made of glass and a sign below the window is marked 422 ft (129 m) from home plate.

=== Crawford Boxes ===
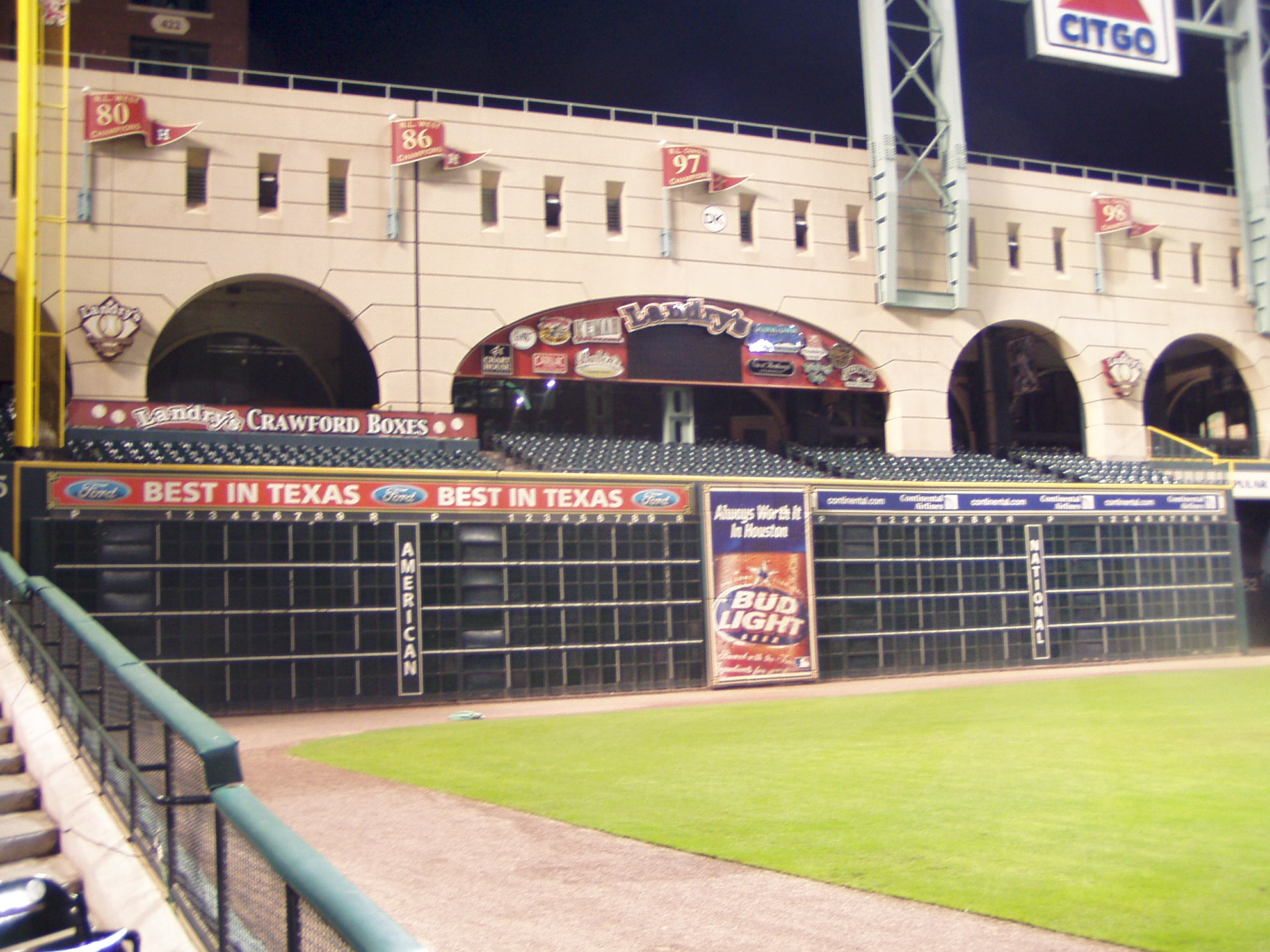
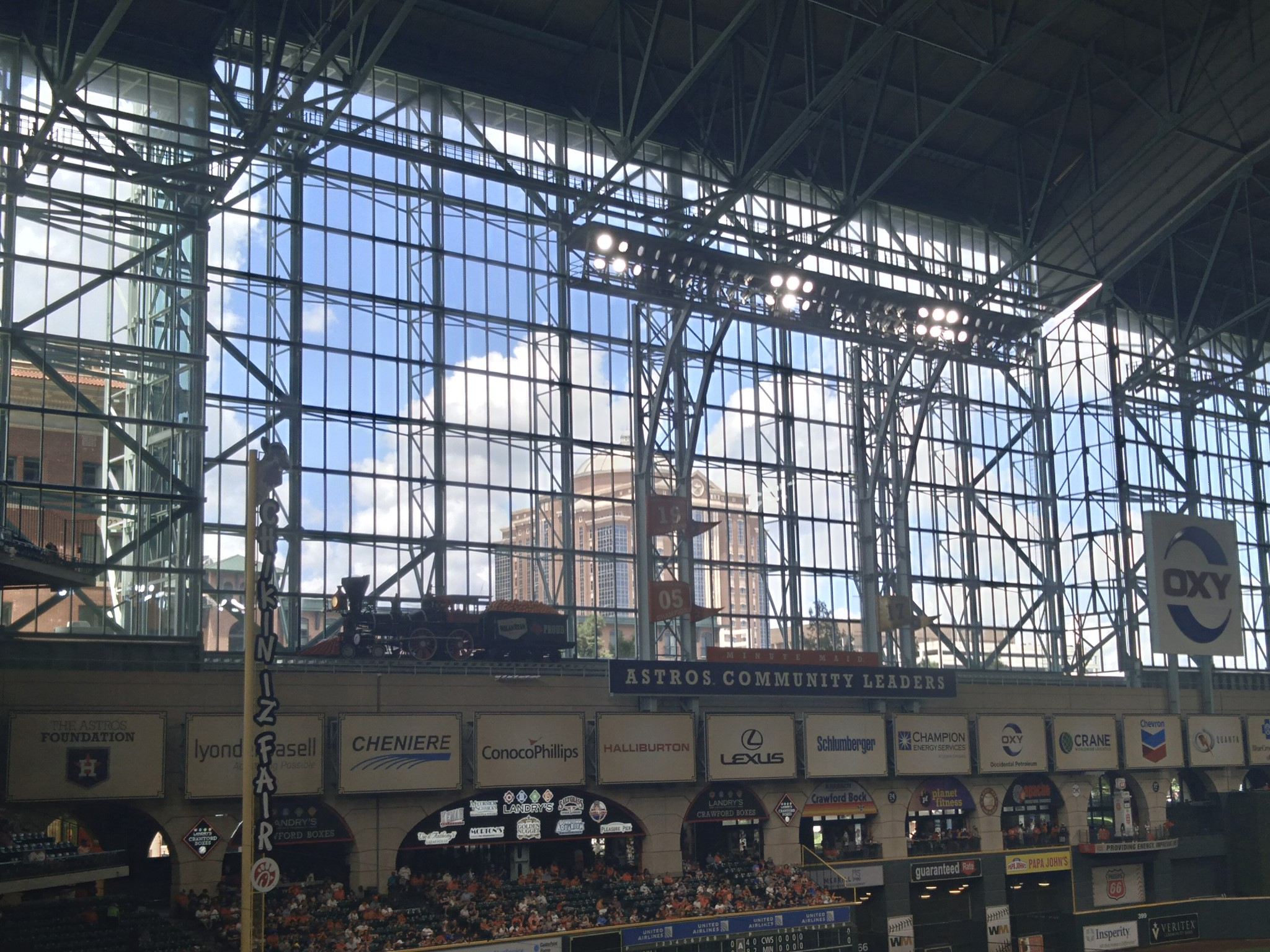
View of Crawford Boxes in its original incarnation in 2006 (left) and from renovations done in the 2010s (2021). Division pennants were moved higher up around the park while world and league championship pennants fly right above the Crawford Boxes. The foul pole was also decorated with a promotional deal with Chick-fil-A to go along with other promotions involving community leaders.

The Crawford Boxes are a section of seating in Daikin Park running parallel to Crawford Street in downtown Houston, Texas. They are located in left field and span sections 100 through 104 (with all but the last in fair territory).

The home-plate-to-fence measurement there is only 315 feet (96 meters), one of the shortest in Major League Baseball. Home runs must clear a 19-foot wall in front of the elevated boxes which houses the hand-operated out-of-town scoreboard, displaying the day's other games.

Landry's, a restaurant group, had bought the naming rights to the Crawford Boxes in 2003, which ran various promotions for its restaurants there.

=== Other features ===
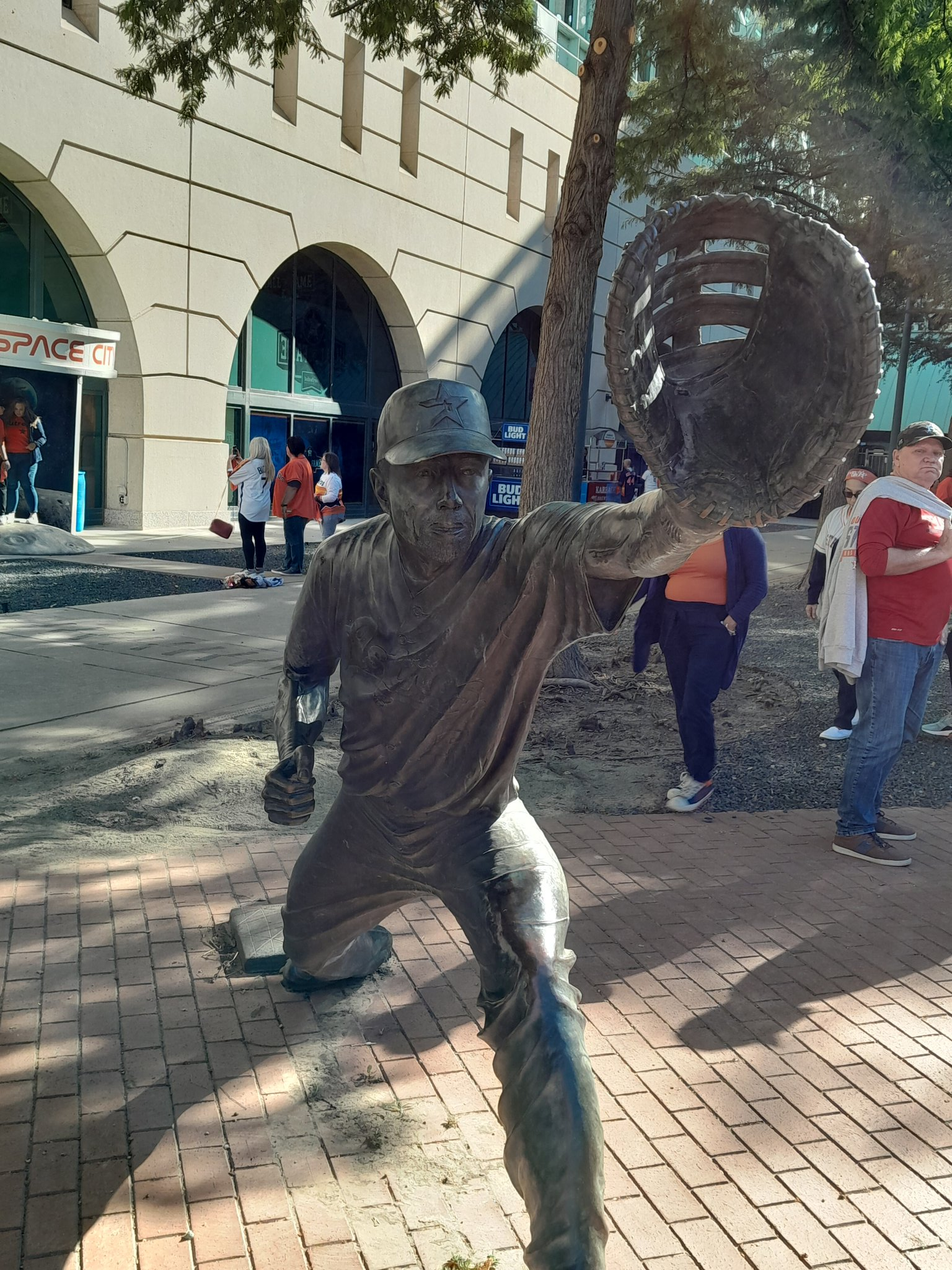
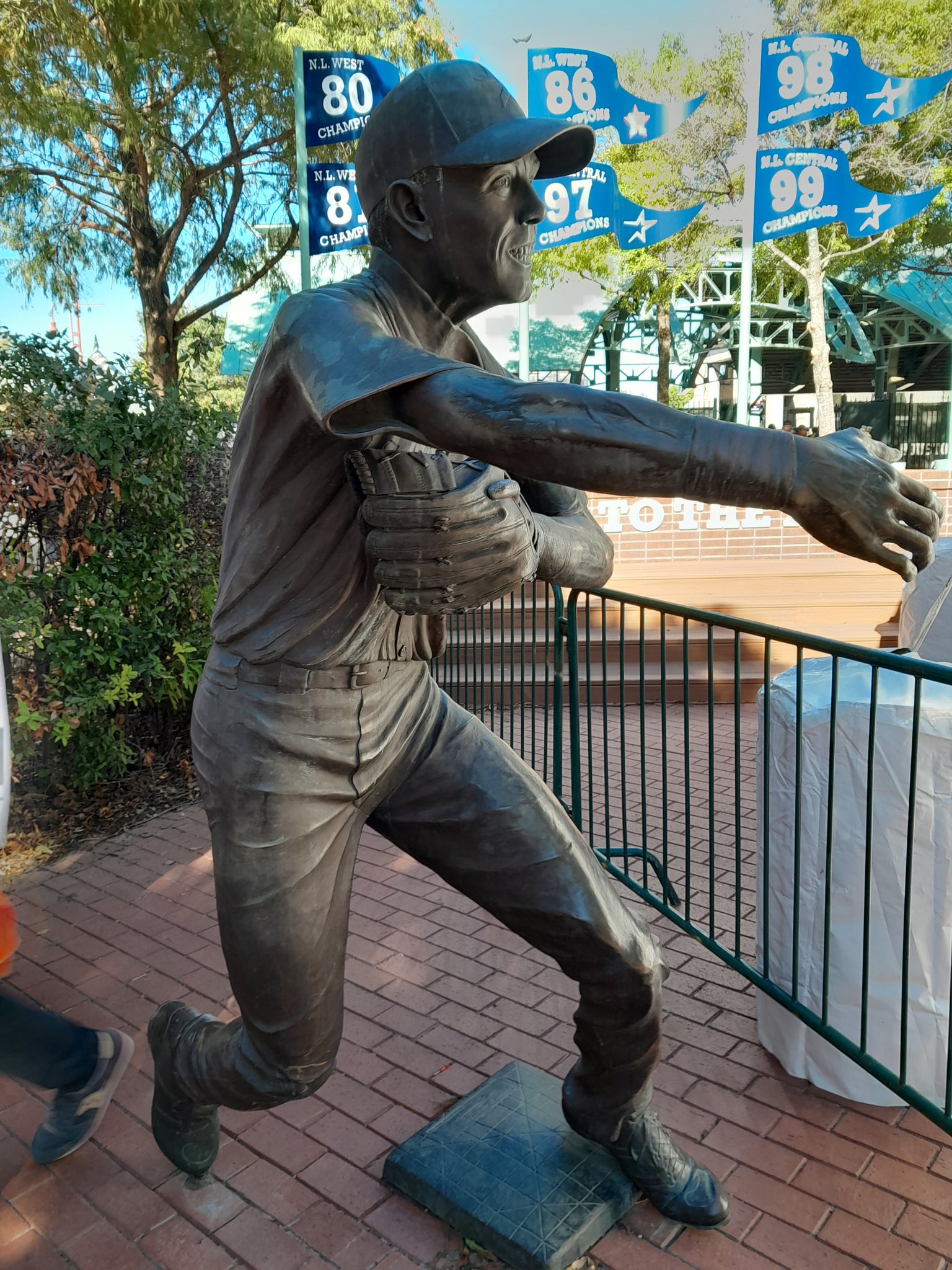
Statues of Jeff Bagwell (left) and Craig Biggio (right) are located near the front of Daikin Park.

Games are typically played with the roof open only in April and May before the Houston summer heat arrives. In the first twenty seasons of the park (2000-2019), the Astros played 1,614 games at home and played with the roof closed for the whole game for 1,103 of them (for the 2017-2019 postseason games alone, they played all home games with the roof closed).

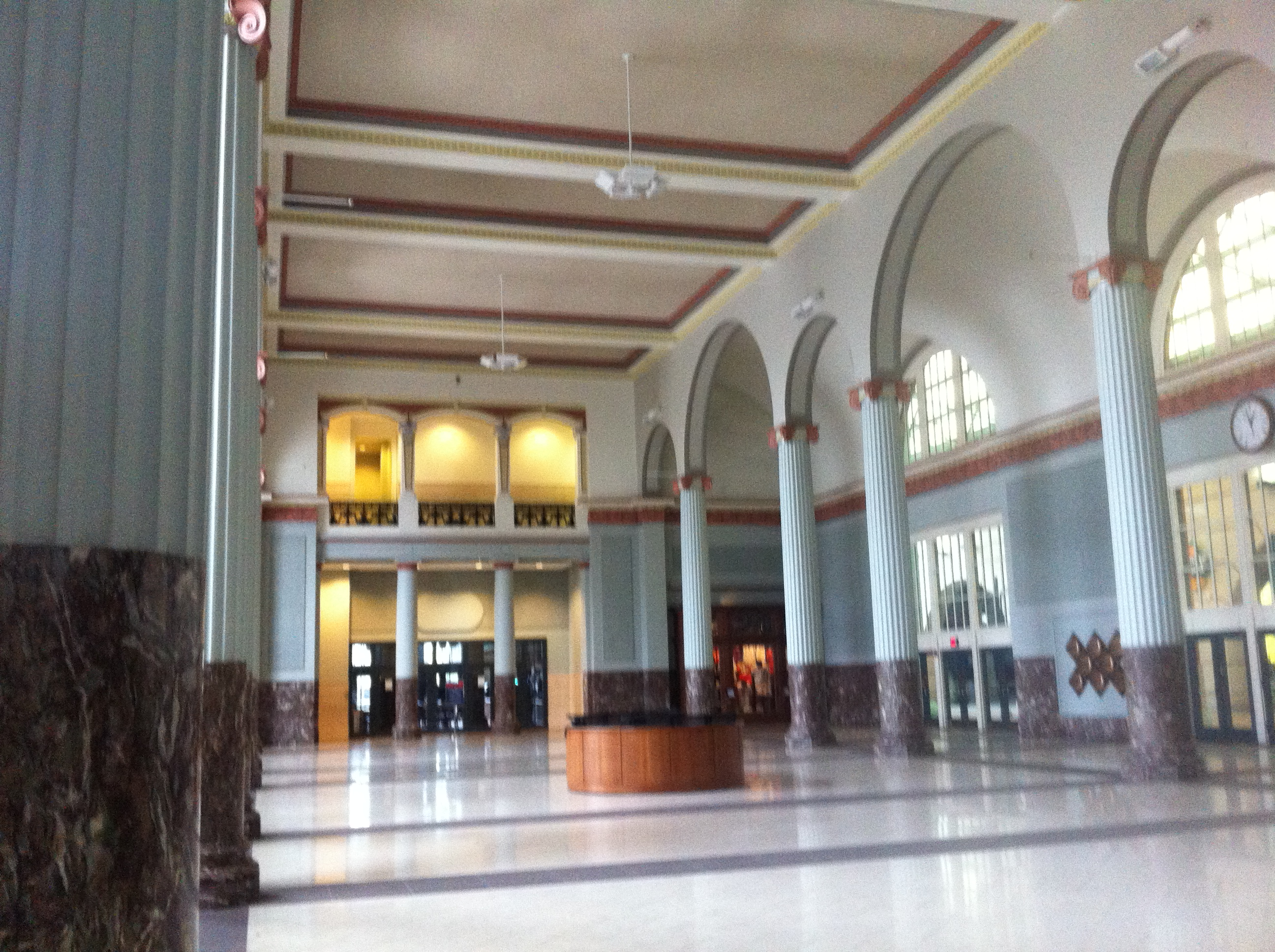
Union Station Lobby is the main entrance to Daikin Park, and the former concourse of Houston's original Union Station built in 1911.

There is a manually operated out-of-town scoreboard in left, below the Crawford Boxes.

The ballpark features 19,201 seats on the lower level, 7,132 seats on the second level, 880 seats on the suite level, and 13,750 seats on the upper level.

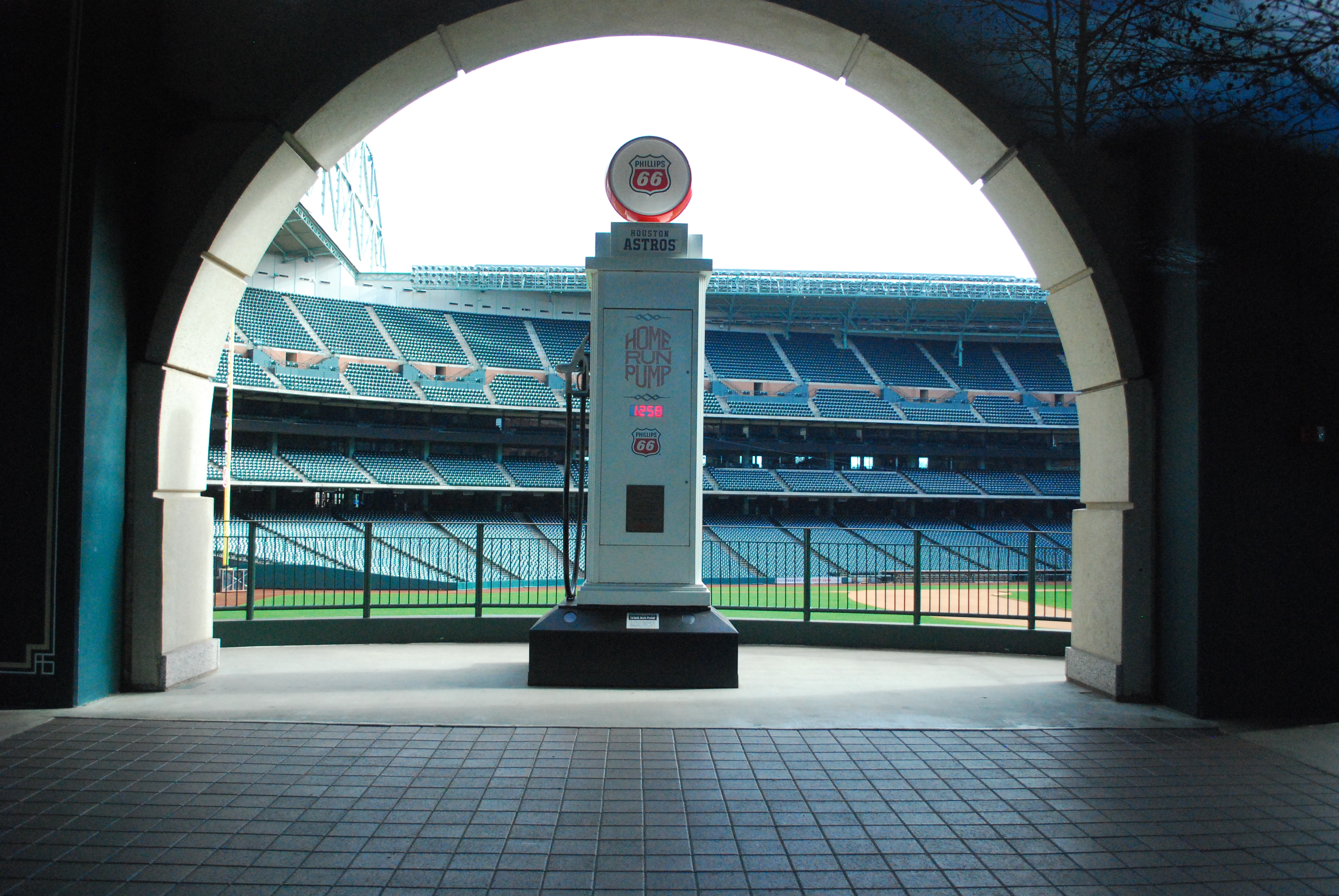
The Phillips 66 Home Run Pump

The "Phillips 66 Home Run Porch" is located in left-center field over the field of play. It features a classic gasoline pump that displays the total number of Astros home runs hit since the park opened.

The stadium can be fully air-conditioned when required.

=== Ground rules ===
Under the stadium's ground rules at the time, both Tal's Hill and the flagpole were considered in play. If a ball hit the flagpole on the hill and stayed in the field of play, it was in play. If it went out of the field of play (over the fence), it was a home run. The Hill was criticized numerous times owing to the incline having the potential to cause injury to fielders unused to it. However, there was never an injury to any player in relation to Tal's Hill.

== Transportation access ==
Daikin Park is located in Downtown Houston in a centralized area of the city, and accessible via a short driving distance on Interstate 10 (Katy Freeway/East Freeway), Interstate 69 (Southwest Freeway/Eastex Freeway), and Interstate 45 (Gulf Freeway/North Freeway). Street parking, garage parking, and private lot parking are available, with an estimated 25,000 spots within walking distance to the ballpark. Taxi cabs and pedicabs are also commonly found near the surrounding ballpark area.

Public transportation allows for accessibility via bus or light rail service. The METRORail light rail system has a station located one block south of Daikin Park, Convention District Station, served by the Green and Purple lines. The Red Line also serves the ballpark at Preston Station, six blocks to the west.

== Hurricane Harvey ==
In 2017, the park and the entire city suffered from the devastation of Hurricane Harvey, which flooded many parts of the city with several feet of rain over four days. The Astros reported that despite water entering into the service levels of the stadium, Minute Maid Park remained in "good condition" when the storm cleared out. The lingering effects of Harvey forced the Astros to move their series against the Texas Rangers to Tropicana Field in St. Petersburg, Florida. The Astros returned to Houston on Friday, September 1 to help the initial recovery efforts. Minute Maid Park hosted the city's first post-Harvey sporting event, and the park's first double-header the next day in an interleague game against the New York Mets.

Events and tenants
Preceded by Astrodome	Home of the Houston Astros; 2000–present	Succeeded by Current
Preceded by U.S. Cellular Field	Host of the All-Star Game; 2004	Succeeded by Comerica Park
Preceded by U.S. Cellular Field	Host of the Civil Rights Game; 2014	Succeeded by Dodger Stadium
