= Alaska Reads Act =

2022 Alaskan literacy act

Alaska State Legislature
- Long title: An Act to improve early literacy among Alaskan children
- Citation: Alaska Statutes (2022)
- Enacted by: Alaska Legislature
- Enacted: May 2022
- Signed by: Governor Mike Dunleavy
- Signed: June 2022
- Status: In force

The Alaska Reads Act, signed into law by Governor Mike Dunleavy in June 2022, is an act aimed at improving early literacy among Alaskan children, particularly those in kindergarten through third grade. This act was co-sponsored by Governor Dunleavy and former Democratic Senator Tom Begich and is part of Alaska's strategic plan to ensure that all students can read at grade level by the end of third grade.

== History ==
In 2019, Alaska's national rankings for fourth-grade reading ability reached their lowest level. Lawmakers looked at solutions and considered actions taken by other states. Mississippi, which usually ranked at the bottom, experienced a considerable increase after adopting a new assessment or screening tools and intervention reading programs in schools. Dubbed the "Mississippi Miracle," students moved from 49th place in 2013 to 29th in 2019. Inspired by this success, Alaska lawmakers introduced similar legislation.

== Legislation ==
The Alaska Reads Act of 2022 introduced several key initiatives aimed at enhancing reading proficiency among young students. Central to this act is the Comprehensive Reading Intervention Program, which requires the implementation of a statewide screening tool to identify reading deficiencies in students from kindergarten through third grade (K-3).

Another critical component is the School Improvement Reading Program to offer direct support and intervention to reading programs in K-3 classrooms and extends reading support across Alaska's school districts. The Alaska Department of Education evaluates how many schools can be adequately supported by reading specialists, focusing on the lowest-performing 25 percent of schools.

The act also established a Virtual Education Consortium to provide virtual education resources and professional development opportunities to students and teachers across the state.

== Initial results ==
The Alaska Legislature passed the Alaska Reads Act in May 2022. Implementation of the program began in 2023. Program outcomes in 2024 showed improvement. At the beginning of the school year, 41% of students reached early literacy benchmarks. By the end of the year, this figure increased to 57%. Among kindergartners, the proficiency rate rose from 24% at the start of the year to 60% by the year's end.

Governor Mike Dunleavy issued the statement, "I'm encouraged by the improvements Alaska's students are already experiencing because of the Alaska Reads Act, as these results are beginning to show, when we implement effective education reform, Alaska's students are capable of success."
