= Cal Towey =

American baseball player

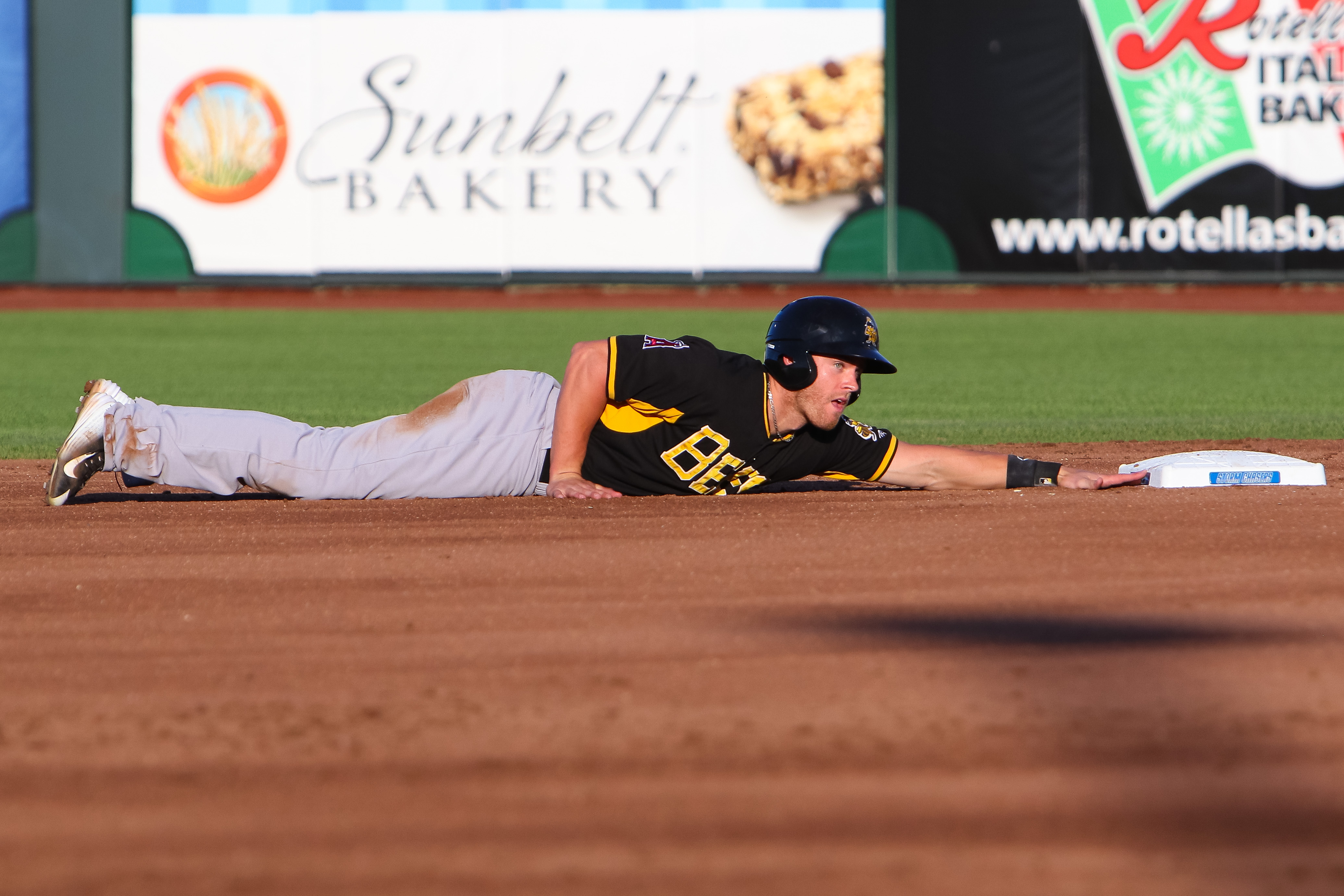
- Towey with the Salt Lake Bees in 2014
- Third baseman / Outfielder
- Born: February 6, 1990 (age 35); Kirkland, Washington, U.S.
- Bats: Left Throws: Right
- Stats at Baseball Reference

Cal Joseph Towey (born February 6, 1990) is an American former professional baseball player. He played in the Los Angeles Angels of Anaheim and Miami Marlins organizations.

== Playing career ==
=== Amateur ===
Towey attended Eastside Catholic High School in Sammamish, Washington. He played shortstop for the school's baseball team. Towey was selected by The Seattle Times as First Team All-Metro League in his junior year, and an All-Seattle metropolitan area selection after his senior year.

Coaches for the Baylor Bears baseball team noticed Towey in a tournament in Florida. On their urging, he enrolled at Baylor University to play college baseball for the Bears as a walk-on. He played as a right fielder in his first two years at Baylor, and as a third baseman in his final two years. In 2011, he played collegiate summer baseball with the Hyannis Harbor Hawks of the Cape Cod Baseball League. In 2013, Towey was named the Most Outstanding Player at the Houston College Classic. That year, he was also a Second Team All-Big 12 Conference selection.

=== Los Angeles Angels ===
After his senior year at Baylor, the Los Angeles Angels of Anaheim selected Towey in the 17th round of the 2013 MLB draft. He signed and spent 2013 with the rookie–level Orem Owlz where he batted .317 with eight home runs and 53 RBI in 70 games. In 2014, he played for the High–A Inland Empire 66ers and batted .279 with ten home runs and 63 RBI in 128 games. That same season, the Angels also attempted to convert him into a catcher. After the 2014 season, the Angels assigned Towey to the Arizona Fall League. In 2015, he played for the Double–A Arkansas Travelers where he compiled a .215 batting average with two home runs and 49 RBI in 101 games, and in 2016, he played for both Arkansas and the Triple–A Salt Lake Bees where he slashed a combined .264/.376/.436 with 13 home runs and 49 RBI in 135 total games.

On December 8, 2016, at the Winter Meetings, the Miami Marlins selected Towey from the Angels in the minor league phase of the Rule 5 draft. He spent 2017 with both the Double–A Jacksonville Jumbo Shrimp and Triple–A New Orleans Baby Cakes, posting a combined .222 batting average with five home runs and 35 RBI in 102 total games between the two clubs. He was released from the Marlins organization on March 22, 2018.

=== Kansas City T-Bones ===
On March 30, 2018, Towey signed with the Kansas City T-Bones of the American Association of Independent Professional Baseball. In 23 games for the club, he batted .341/.417/.565 with three home runs and 18 RBI. Towey was released on March 6, 2019.

== Post-playing career ==
In November 2021, Towey joined the Detroit Tigers organization as a Northwestern Area scout.

== Personal life ==
Towey's father, Curt, and uncle, Steve, both played in Minor League Baseball. Curt coached Cal's team at Eastside Catholic.
