= Flag of Houston =

City of Houston
- Proportion: 1:2 (official); 17:30 (usage)
- Adopted: 1915; 111 years ago
- Design: A blue field with the Seal of Houston in the center of a 5-pointed star in the middle of the flag
- Designed by: W. A. Wheeldon

The initial flag design had Sam Houston's coat of arms in the middle, instead of the city seal

The flag of Houston, Texas consists of a large white five-pointed star on a blue background with the city's seal set within the star. The flag was adopted in 1915.

In 1915, Mayor Ben Campbell decided Houston should have its own flag and organized a contest to solicit submissions from the public. According to a Houston Post clipping from 1915, one design idea included an illustration of Houston as a meteor, "the head of the star of which was plowing its way through a sky of equal proportions of red and blue."

The winning design was submitted by Major W.A. Wheeldon, a British ex-pat. The design, drawn by Mrs. J.W. Greenhill Jr., originally depicted the coat of arms of Sam Houston's family. A panel of contest judges, however, substituted the city seal for the coat of arms, saying it was more forward-looking.

The city seal was adopted in 1840, not long after the city was founded by Augustus Chapman Allen and John Kirby Allen. It depicts a 4-4-0 locomotive, although it was before any railroad reached Houston. According to John Lienhard, a professor emeritus of mechanical engineering and history at the University of Houston said the 4-4-0 locomotive featured prominently on the seal had only been around for three years at that point.

This flag is not very popular or displayed commonly. In 2015, an original 1915 prototype for what would become the official flag was found in a resident's garage and was given to Preservation Houston. Eventually, the group raised $3,500 to have the flag restored. The North American Vexillological Association kicked in the remainder of the cost with a $500 grant. The flag was sent to be restored in New Orleans and now hangs in the Julia Ideson Library downtown.
