= Tom Begich =

American politician (born 1960)

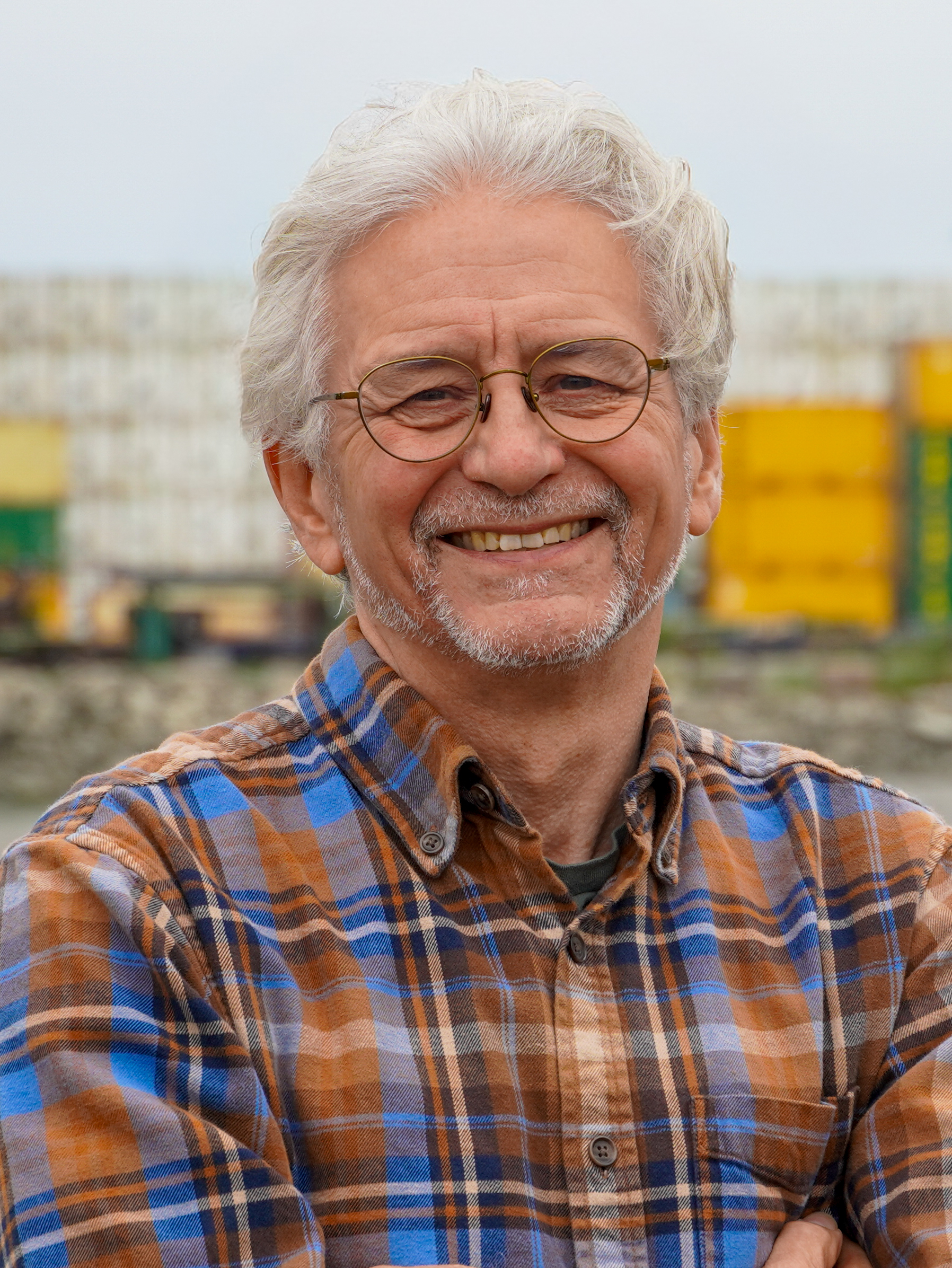
- Begich in 2026

Minority Leader of the Alaska Senate
- In office January 15, 2019 – January 17, 2023
- Preceded by: Berta Gardner
- Succeeded by: Shelley Hughes

Member of the Alaska Senate
- In office January 17, 2017 – January 17, 2023
- Preceded by: Johnny Ellis
- Succeeded by: Löki Tobin (District I)
- Constituency: District J

Personal details
- Born: Thomas Scott Begich; October 31, 1960 (age 65) Anchorage, Alaska, U.S.
- Party: Democratic
- Spouse: Sarah Sledge
- Relatives: Nick Begich Sr. (father); Mark Begich (brother); Nick Begich III (nephew)
- Education: Bard College (BA)
- Website: Campaign website

Thomas Scott Begich (born October 31, 1960) is an American politician who served as a Democratic member of the Alaska Senate for J district from 2017 to 2023. In August 2025, he announced he would run in the 2026 Alaska gubernatorial election, eventually dropping out after advancing to the general election. He is the son of former U.S. representative Nick Begich Sr., brother of former U.S. senator Mark Begich, and uncle of current U.S. representative Nick Begich III.

== Career ==
Begich is a musician and author. He has released six albums and has performed in venues across the country. He is also the author of a book of poetry, "Six Truths, Fifty Sonnets." He was a delegate to the 2004 Democratic National Convention.

Begich is the owner and operator of consulting firm CW Communications, previously known as the Research Group, Inc.

Begich was elected to the Alaska Senate in 2016 and was reelected twice without general election opposition. In 2022, his seat was redistricted, and Begich chose to withdraw his candidacy for the seat.

In 2020, Begich partnered with Alaska Governor Mike Dunleavy to introduce the Alaska Reads Act, an initiative aimed to improve reading for kindergarten through third-grade students through a reading intervention program, teacher training, and data reporting requirements. The Alaska Reads Act was passed by the Alaska Legislature in May 2022.

In August 2025, Begich announced he would be running in the 2026 Alaska gubernatorial election. He was seeking to replace Republican Mike Dunleavy, who is barred from seeking re-election due to term limits. In August 2026, Begich announced that he would be suspending his campaign and endorsed Jonathan Kreiss-Tomkins.

== Personal life ==
Tom Begich comes from a prominent political family in Alaska. Begich's father was Nick Begich Sr., a member of the United States House of Representatives who disappeared in 1972. His brother, Mark, was a member of the United States Senate for one term and mayor of Anchorage. His nephew, Nick Begich III, is currently Alaska's representative to the United States House of Representatives. Tom Begich's uncle, Joseph Begich, served for 18 years in the Minnesota House of Representatives.

Begich's wife, Sarah Sledge, is a singer and songwriter.

Alaska Senate
Preceded by Berta Gardner	Minority Leader of the Alaska Senate; 2019–2023	Succeeded by Shelley Hughes
