= Ryan Berry =

American politician

Member-elect of the Alaska Senate from the M district
- Assuming office TBD
- Succeeding: Cathy Tilton

Personal details
- Born: San Diego, California
- Died: 1980 or 1981 (age 44–45)
- Party: Republican
- Education: University of Southern Indiana
- Website: Campaign website

Ryan Berry is an American mortgage broker and politician from Alaska. A Republican, he is a member-elect of the Alaska Senate, representing the M district. He was elected in 2026, defeating appointed incumbent Cathy Tilton following ranked-choice tabulation.

== Background ==
Berry was born in San Diego, California, and his family moved to the Mat-Su Valley in 1983. He graduated from Colony High School in 1999 followed by the University of Southern Indiana in 2003. He has worked as president of Amped Mortgage Inc. in Wasilla, Alaska.

== Political career ==
In the 2026 Alaska Senate election, Berry narrowly defeated appointed incumbent Cathy Tilton by more than 450 votes following ranked-choice tabulation.
