= 2014 Alaska Senate election =

- November 4, 2014

14 of 20 seats in the Alaska Senate 11 seats needed for a majority
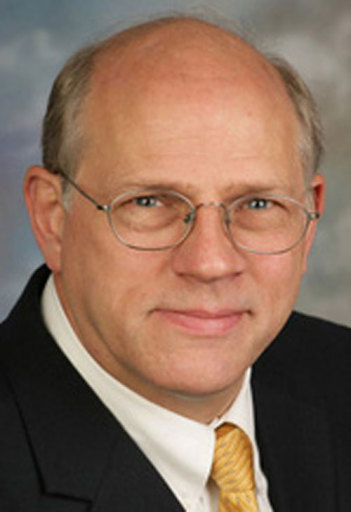

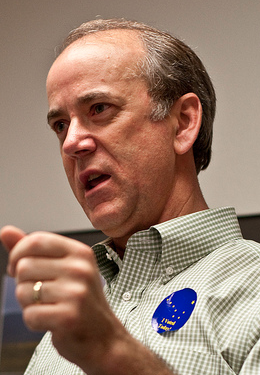
	Majority party	Minority party
Leader	John Coghill	Hollis French (Retired)
Party	Republican	Democratic
Leader since	January 15, 2013	January 15, 2013
Leader's seat	District O	District I
Seats before	13	7
Seats after	14	6
Seat change	▲1	▼1
Popular vote	98,153	77,108
Percentage	59.96%	27.05%
- Results: Republican gain Democratic hold Republican hold No election
President pro tempore before election
Peter Micciche
Republican
President pro tempore-designate
Peter Micciche
Republican

The 2014 Alaska Senate elections were held on Friday, November 4, 2014, with the primary elections on August 19, 2014. Voters in 14 districts of the Alaska Senate elected their representatives. The elections coincided with the elections for the state assembly.

== Overview ==
2014 Alaska Senate elections General election — November 4, 2014
Party	Votes	Percentage	Not up	Contested	Before	After	+/–
Republican	98,153	52.90%	5	9	13	14	▲1
Democratic	77,108	41.56%	2	5	7	6	▼1
Independent	8,329	4.49%	0	2	0	0	Steady
Write-ins	1,945	1.05%	0	14	0	0	Steady

== Predictions ==
Source	Ranking	As of
Governing	Likely R	October 20, 2014

== Results ==
=== District A ===
2014 Alaska Senate district A election
Party	Candidate	Votes	%
Republican	Pete Kelly	5,393	60.42%
Democratic	Tamara Kruse Roselius	3,484	39.03%
Write-ins	Write-ins	49	0.55%
Total votes		8,926	100%

=== District C ===
2014 Alaska Senate district C election
Party	Candidate	Votes	%
Republican	Click Bishop (incumbent)	8,424	64.01%
Democratic	Dorothy J. Shockley	4,659	35.40%
Write-ins	Write-ins	77	0.59%
Total votes		13,160	100%

=== District E ===
2014 Alaska Senate district E election
Party	Candidate	Votes	%
Republican	Mike Dunleavy	9,058	64.65%
Independent	Warren Keogh	4,888	34.89%
Write-ins	Write-ins	65	0.46%
Total votes		14,011	100%

=== District F ===
2014 Alaska Senate district F election
Party	Candidate	Votes	%
Republican	Bill Stoltze	11,338	73.08%
Democratic	Patricia R. Chesbro	4,117	26.54%
Write-ins	Write-ins	59	0.38%
Total votes		15,514	100%

=== District G ===
2014 Alaska Senate district G election
Party	Candidate	Votes	%
Republican	Anna Fairclough (incumbent)	9,897	77.10%
Democratic	Jim Arlington	2,878	22.42%
Write-ins	Write-ins	61	0.48%
Total votes		12,836	100%

=== District I ===
2014 Alaska Senate district I election
Party	Candidate	Votes	%
Democratic	Berta Gardner	8,769	92.76%
Write-ins	Write-ins	684	7.24%
Total votes		9,453	100%

=== District K ===
2014 Alaska Senate district K election
Party	Candidate	Votes	%
Republican	Mia Costello	8,529	56.50%
Democratic	Clare Ross	6,531	43.26%
Write-ins	Write-ins	36	0.24%
Total votes		15,096	100%

=== District M ===
2014 Alaska Senate district M election
Party	Candidate	Votes	%
Republican	Kevin Meyer (incumbent)	9,909	69.71%
Democratic	Felix E. Rivera	4,239	29.82%
Write-ins	Write-ins	66	0.46%
Total votes		14,214	100%

=== District N ===
2014 Alaska Senate district N election
Party	Candidate	Votes	%
Republican	Cathy Giessel (incumbent)	9,657	54.70%
Democratic	Harry Crawford	7,938	44.97%
Write-ins	Write-ins	58	0.33%
Total votes		17,653	100%

=== District O ===
2014 Alaska Senate district O election
Party	Candidate	Votes	%
Republican	Peter Micciche (incumbent)	11,306	76.22%
Independent	Eric D. Treider	3,441	23.20%
Write-ins	Write-ins	86	0.58%
Total votes		14,833	100%

=== District P ===
2014 Alaska Senate district P election
Party	Candidate	Votes	%
Republican	Gary Stevens (incumbent)	9,889	71.57%
Democratic	Robert "Moose" Henrichs	3,866	27.98%
Write-ins	Write-ins	62	0.45%
Total votes		13,817	100%

=== District Q ===
2014 Alaska Senate district Q election
Party	Candidate	Votes	%
Democratic	Dennis Egan (incumbent)	12,521	72.14%
Republican	Tom Williams	4,753	27.38%
Write-ins	Write-ins	83	0.48%
Total votes		17,357	100%

=== District S ===
2014 Alaska Senate district S election
Party	Candidate	Votes	%
Democratic	Lyman Hoffman (incumbent)	8,727	96.28%
Write-ins	Write-ins	337	3.72%
Total votes		9,064	100%

=== District T ===
2014 Alaska Senate district T election
Party	Candidate	Votes	%
Democratic	Donny Olson (incumbent)	9,379	97.69%
Write-ins	Write-ins	222	2.31%
Total votes		9,601	100%
