= Seal of Houston =

Seal of the City of Houston
- Armiger: John Whitmire, Mayor of Houston
- Adopted: 1840
- Supporter: None
- Use: City flag, official correspondence, insignia of city agencies and institutions

The Seal of the City of Houston is the insignia seal of the city of Houston. The Houston City Council, on Monday, February 17, 1840, passed a resolution calling for the designing of a city seal. The council adopted the seal, designed by state senator and former Mayor of Houston Dr. Francis Moore, Jr., on February 24, 1840. The center of the seal has the lone star, symbolizing the new nation in the west. The locomotive symbolizes progress, and the plow symbolizes Texas's agriculture; the seal symbolizes the rails transporting Texas's crops. The seal originally did not have the "Texas" at the bottom, but the text was added later. The city of Houston stated that the original seal "seemed to have disappeared" until the city of Houston’s assistant secretary, Margaret Westerman, discovered it in December 1939.

The train has been featured in the seal of Houston since 1840 because of Houston's historical role in the regional railroad system; Houston served as a railroad hub for many years.
