= Alaska Senate district T =

Alaskan legislative district

Alaska's T State Senate district
Senator
Donny Olson; D–Golovin
since 2003
- Population: 36,277

Alaska Senate district T is one of 20 districts of the Alaska Senate. It has been represented by Democrat Donny Olson since 2003. Olson previously represented District S from 2001-2003. District T is located in North and Western Alaska and encompasses the entirety of Alaska's 39th House of Representatives district and 40th House of Representatives district, including the Kusilvak Census Area, Northwest Arctic Borough, Nome Census Area, and North Slope Borough.

== Election results (2022 boundaries) ==
=== 2024 ===
Nonpartisan primary
Party	Candidate	Votes	%
Democratic	Donny Olson (incumbent)	2,187	100

General election
Party	Candidate	Votes	%
Democratic	Donny Olson (incumbent)	6,273	97.63
Write-in		152	2.37
Total votes		6,425	100.0
Democratic hold			
Coalition hold			

== Election results (2013 boundaries) ==
Map of District T of the Alaska Senate from 2013 to 2022

=== 2020 ===
Republican primary
Party	Candidate	Votes	%
Republican	Thomas Baker	674	60.7
Republican	Calvin Moto II	437	39.3
Total votes		1,111	100.0

Democratic primary
Party	Candidate	Votes	%
Democratic	Donny Olson (incumbent)	2,847	100.0
Total votes		2,847	100.0

General election
Party	Candidate	Votes	%
Democratic	Donny Olson (incumbent)	6,604	65.3
Republican	Thomas Baker	3,422	33.8
Write-in	Write-ins	89	0.9
Total votes		10,115	100.0
Democratic hold			

=== 2016 ===
Democratic primary
Party	Candidate	Votes	%
Democratic	Donny Olson (incumbent)	2,563	100.0
Total votes		2,563	100

General election
Party	Candidate	Votes	%
Democratic	Donny Olson (incumbent)	8,603	96.94
Write-ins	Write-ins	272	3.06
Total votes		8,875	100
Democratic hold			

=== 2014 ===
Democratic primary
Party	Candidate	Votes	%
Democratic	Donny Olson (incumbent)	3,968	100.0
Total votes		3,968	100

General election
Party	Candidate	Votes	%
Democratic	Donny Olson (incumbent)	9,379	97.69
Write-ins	Write-ins	222	2.31
Total votes		9,601	100
Democratic hold			

== Election results (2012 boundaries) ==
Map of District T of the Alaska Senate from 2012 to 2013

=== 2012 ===
Republican primary
Party	Candidate	Votes	%
Republican	Allen Minish	1,284	47.06
Total votes		1,284	100

Democratic primary
Party	Candidate	Votes	%
Democratic	Donny Olson (incumbent)	3,385	100.0
Total votes		3,385	100

General election
Party	Candidate	Votes	%
Democratic	Donny Olson (incumbent)	7,455	75.07
Republican	Allen Minish	2,415	24.32
Write-ins	Write-ins	61	0.61
Total votes		9,931	100
Democratic hold			
