= Bill Wielechowski =

American politician (born 1967)

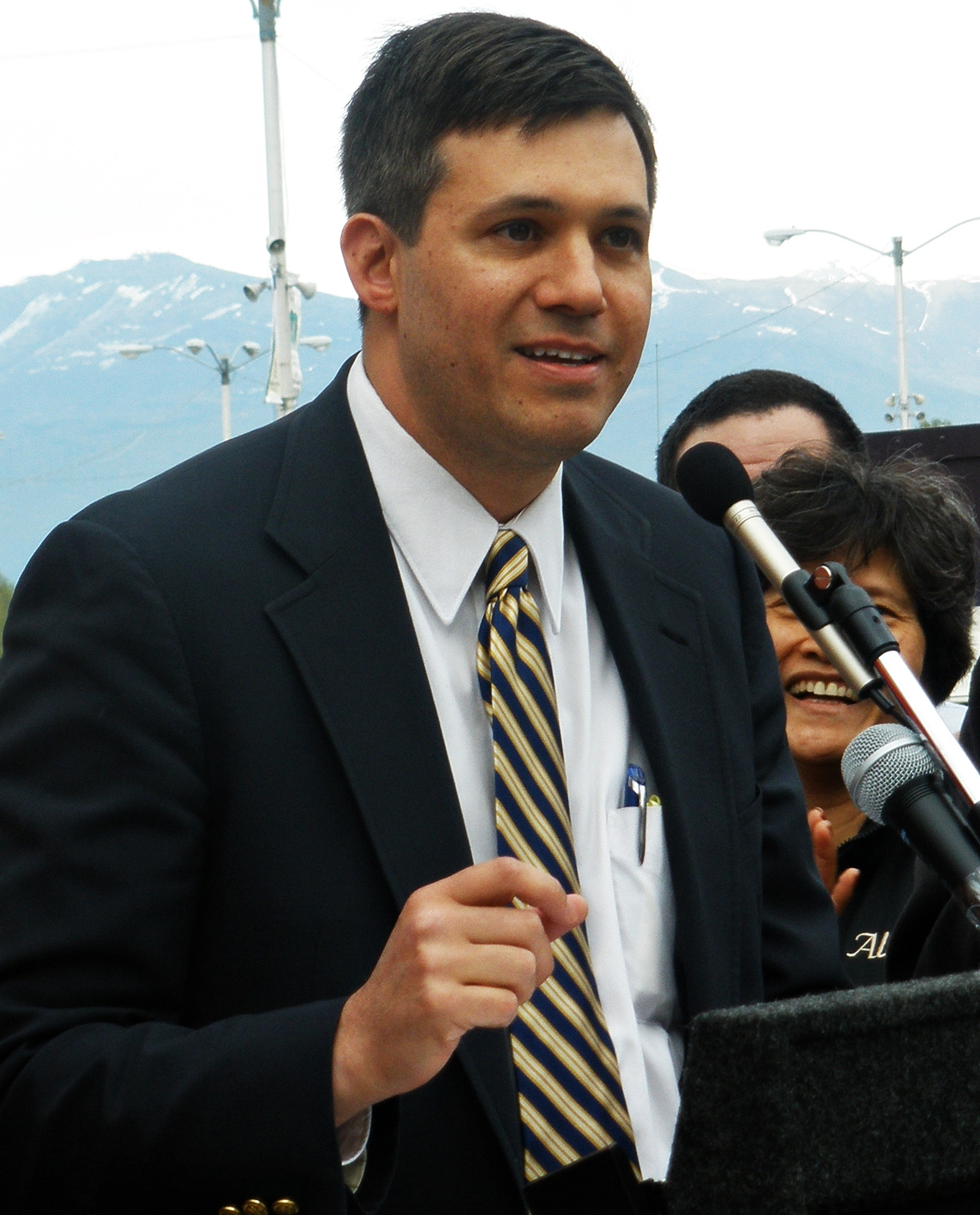
- Wielechowski in 2009

Member of the Alaska Senate
- Incumbent
- Assumed office January 16, 2007
- Preceded by: Gretchen Guess
- Constituency: District J (2007–2013); District G (2013–2015); District H (2015–2023); District K (2023–present)

Personal details
- Born: December 7, 1967 (age 58) Ridgewood, New Jersey, U.S.
- Party: Democratic
- Children: 1
- Education: Seton Hall University (BS, JD)

Bill P. Wielechowski (born December 7, 1967) is an American lawyer serving as a Democratic member of the Alaska Senate representing District K, which is located in Northeast Anchorage, Alaska. Prior to the 2022 redistricting process, he represented District H from 2015 to 2023. Wielechowski also previously represented District J from 2007 to 2013.

== Early life ==
Wielechowski was born December 7, 1967, in Ridgewood, New Jersey, to a Polish-American family (his grandfather immigrated from Kraków in 1910). He attended Seton Hall University earning a Bachelor of Science in business management and finance and graduating magna cum laude. He then attended Seton Hall University School of Law earning his juris doctor in 1992.

After moving to Anchorage, he became a volunteer with the Northeast Community Council, as a Commissioner on the Anchorage Planning & Zoning Commission and as chair of the Creekside Town Center. In 1999 he was the designated chair of the Alaska Workers' Compensation Board.

In 2003, he served on the mayoral transition team for Mark Begich and went on to serve the city as a member of the 2003 Anchorage School District Budget Review Team and the Mayor's Task Force on Obesity and Health. In 2004, he stepped down as designated chair of the Alaska Workers' Compensation Board to become associate general counsel for IBEW Local 1547.

== Alaska Senate ==
In 2006, he was elected to the Alaska Senate to replace retiring Democratic incumbent Gretchen Guess in District J, which included the neighborhoods of Mt. View, Muldoon and Russian Jack in Anchorage. In the 2010 election, he defeated Ron Slepecki winning 58% of the vote to Slepecki's 42%.

He was a majority member of the Senate bi-partisan Working Group from 2007 through 2012. He then joined the Minority Caucus.

In 2013–2014, Senator Wielechowski led an effort to repeal legislation, passed by the legislature in 2013, granting additional tax credits to oil and gas companies. The effort to repeal the legislation was rejected by Alaska voters in 2014.

=== Alaska Permanent Fund ===
In 2016, Senator Wielechowski, alongside former senators Rick Halford and Clem Tillion, filed a lawsuit against the State of Alaska, challenging Governor Bill Walker's veto that reduced the Permanent Fund Dividend (PFD) payments. The plaintiffs argued that the governor's veto violated existing statutes governing the PFD, which mandated automatic transfers from the Permanent Fund's earnings reserve to the dividend fund without requiring legislative appropriation. The Alaska Supreme Court upheld the veto, ruling that the transfer of funds for dividend payments required legislative appropriation and was subject to the governor's veto power.

This lawsuit effectively placed the PFD in direct competition with other state budgetary items, as its funding became contingent upon annual legislative appropriations rather than automatic transfers.

In response to the lawsuit, Governor Bill Walker expressed disappointment that "an incumbent legislator who failed to work towards a solution to our fiscal crisis—a solution that would protect the long-term viability of the PFD—has decided instead to pursue this lawsuit eight weeks prior to his re-election bid.

=== Committee assignments ===
In the 2015-2016 legislative session, Wielechowski served as a member of the following standing committees; Judiciary, Resources and State Affairs. He also served on the Special Committee on Federal Overreach, the Joint Committee on Armed Services
