= Löki Tobin =

American politician

- Tobin in 2023

Member of the Alaska Senate
- Incumbent
- Assumed office January 17, 2023
- Preceded by: Tom Begich (District J)
- Constituency: I

Personal details
- Born: Löki Gale Tobin Nome, Alaska, U.S.
- Party: Democratic
- Education: University of Alaska, Anchorage (BA); University of Alaska, Fairbanks (MA)

Löki Gale Tobin is an American politician serving as a member of the Alaska Senate representing Downtown Anchorage and Joint Base Elmendorf-Richardson. Elected in November 2022, she assumed office on January 17, 2023.

== Early life and education ==
Tobin was born in Nome, Alaska. She earned a Bachelor of Arts degree in psychology and sociology from the University of Alaska Anchorage and a Master of Arts in rural development from the University of Alaska Fairbanks.

== Career ==
From 2008 to 2011, Tobin volunteered with the Peace Corps in Zaqatala, Azerbaijan, through the organization's Master's International program. From 2012 to 2014, Tobin worked as a consultant for Kawerak, a consortium of Native American tribes. From 2013 to 2015, Tobin was the director of communications and donor relations for the Alaska Community Foundation. She worked as the annual giving manager of the Anchorage Museum Association from 2015 to 2019. From 2019 to 2022, Tobin served as the policy director for State Senator Tom Begich. She was elected to the Alaska Senate in November 2022.
