= Elvi Gray-Jackson =

American politician (born 1953)

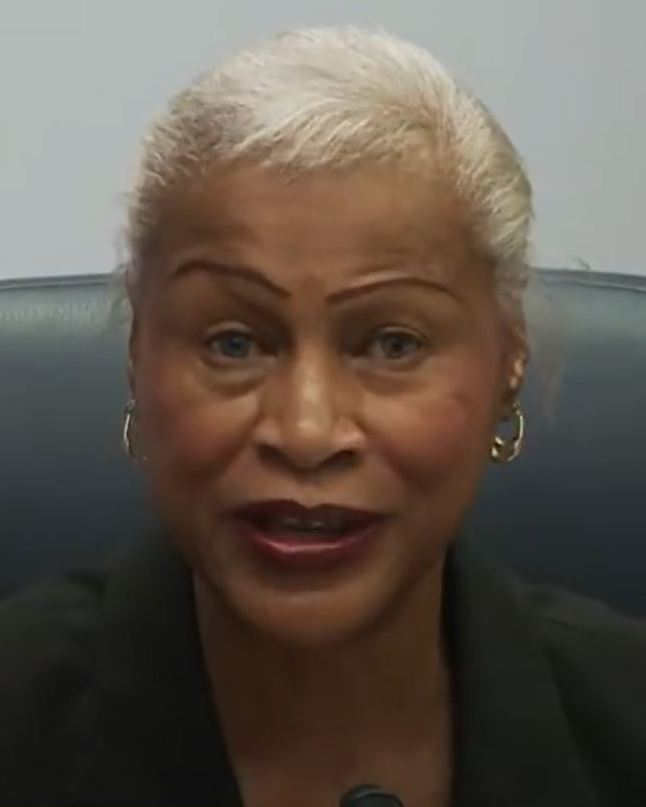

Member of the Alaska Senate
- In office January 15, 2019 – present
- Preceded by: Berta Gardner
- Constituency: I district (2019–2023); G district (2023–present)

Member of the Anchorage Assembly from the 4th district
- In office 2008–2017
- Preceded by: Dick Traini
- Succeeded by: Felix Rivera

Personal details
- Born: April 8, 1953 (age 73) Newark, New Jersey, U.S.
- Party: Democratic
- Education: Fashion Institute of Technology; University of Alaska, Anchorage (AA)

Elvira Gray-Jackson (born April 8, 1953) is an American politician who served as a Democratic member of the Alaska Senate for the G district, representing Midtown Anchorage. She previously served in the Anchorage Assembly from 2008 to 2017.

== Early life and education ==
Gray-Jackson was born on April 8, 1953, in Newark, New Jersey. She graduated from Barringer High School and the Fashion Institute of Technology In 1982, Gray-Jackson moved to Alaska to continue her education at the University of Alaska Anchorage.

== Career ==
Gray-Jackson won the general election on November 6, 2018. She secured sixty percent of the vote while her closest rival, Republican Jim Crawford, secured forty percent.

Gray-Jackson was the first Democrat to announce a campaign for the 2022 United States Senate election in Alaska in February 2022. She criticized incumbent Republican Lisa Murkowski for her votes on Supreme Court appointments, saying "I’m 100% pro-choice and, you know, Sen. Murkowski is pro-choice, too. But she votes for Supreme Court justices that aren’t pro-choice." A month later, Gray-Jackson suspended her campaign citing the fundraising necessary to run a successful campaign and opted to run for re-election to the Alaska Senate.
