= 2024 United States House of Representatives election in Alaska =

2024 United States House of Representatives election in Alaska's at-large district
- November 5, 2024
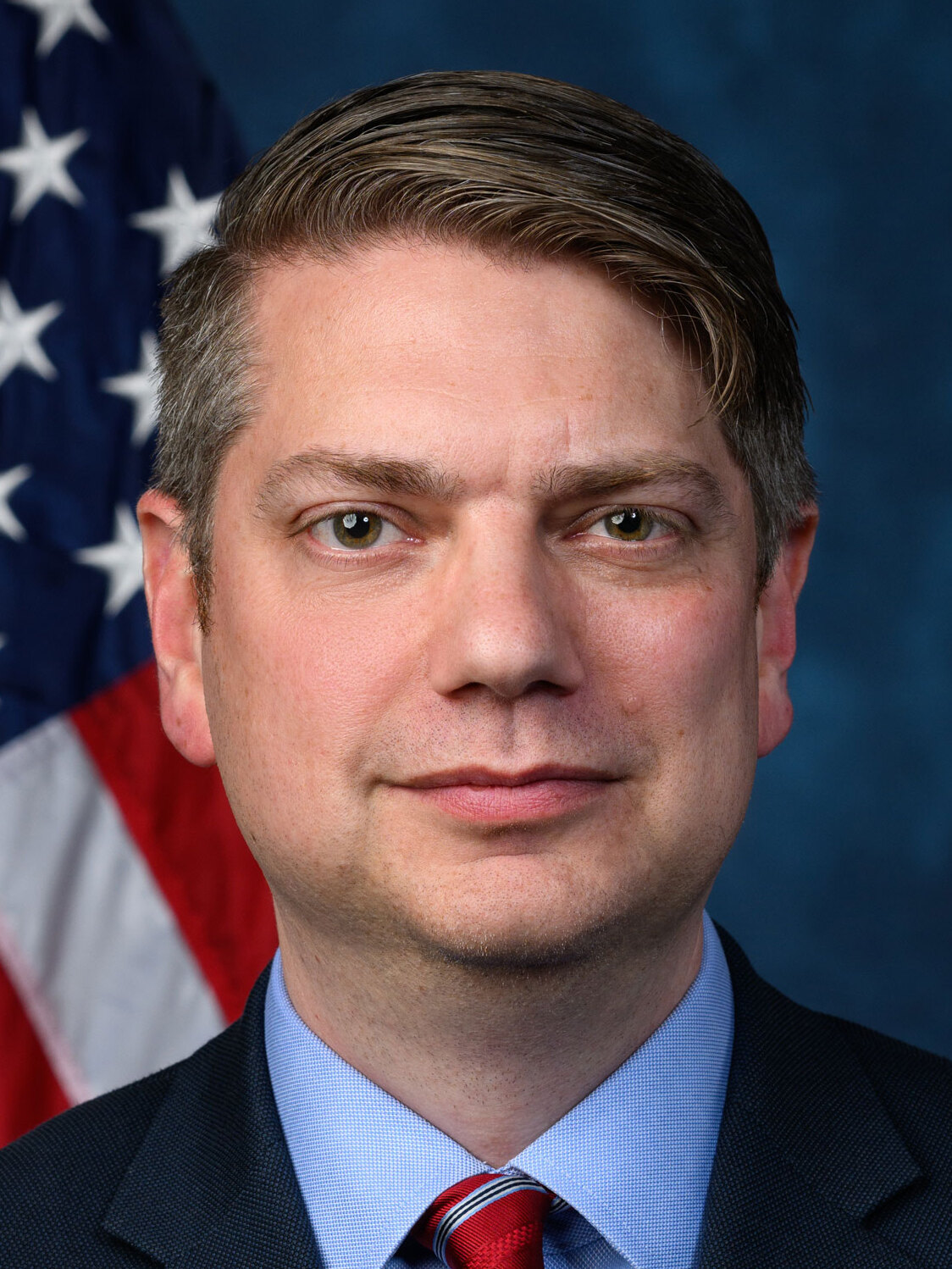

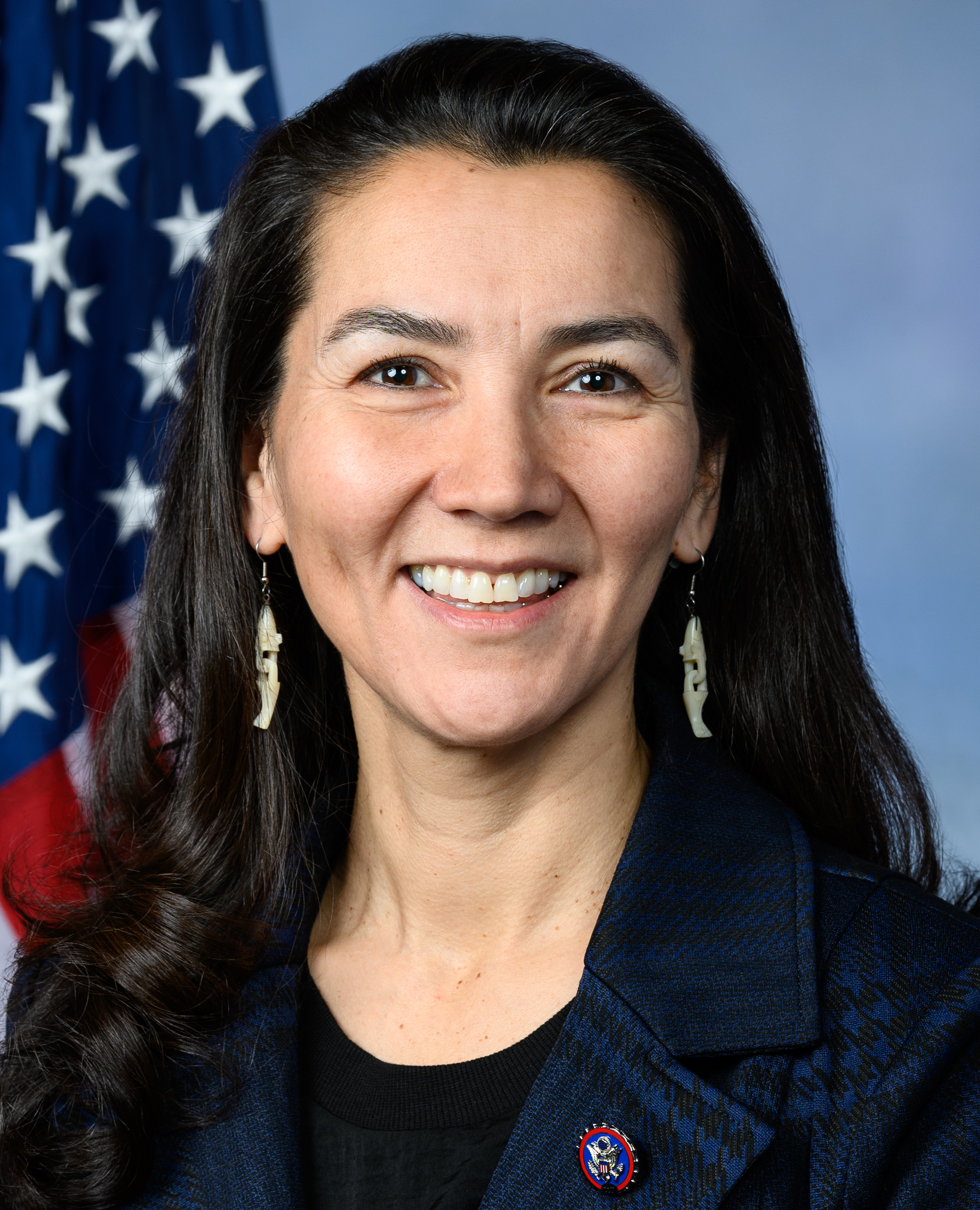
Candidate	Nick Begich III	Mary Peltola
Party	Republican	Democratic
First round	159,550; 48.41%	152,828; 46.37%
Maximum round	164,861; 51.22%	156,985; 48.78%
- Begich: 40–50% 50–60% 60–70% 70–80% 80–90% >90% Peltola: 40–50% 50–60% 60–70% 70–80% 80–90% >90% Tie: 40–50% 50%
U.S. Representative before election
Mary Peltola
Democratic
Elected U.S. Representative
Nick Begich III
Republican

The 2024 United States House of Representatives election in Alaska was held on November 5, 2024, to elect a member of the United States House of Representatives to represent the state of Alaska from its at-large congressional district. The election coincided with the 2024 U.S. presidential election, other elections to the U.S. House, elections to the United States Senate, and various other state and local elections.

Incumbent Mary Peltola, the first Democrat to represent Alaska in the House since 1972, sought a second full term in office. Peltola had been elected in an August 2022 special election to succeed deceased Republican Don Young. She won a full term the following November.

In accordance with 2020 Alaska Measure 2, the race was conducted using the state's ranked-choice voting procedures. Eleven candidates challenged Peltola in the August all-party primary. Republicans Nick Begich III, Nancy Dahlstrom, and Matthew Salisbury initially qualified for spots in the ranked-choice general election, but Dahlstrom and Salisbury withdrew shortly after the primary in a show of party unity. The final general election ballot thus featured Peltola, Begich, Alaskan Independence Party nominee John Wayne Howe, and Democrat Eric Hafner. The Alaska Democratic Party attempted to have Hafner removed from the ballot due to his status as a federal prisoner in New York, but the Alaska Supreme Court rejected their arguments.

Given Alaska's conservative lean, Peltola was considered a top target for Republicans throughout the cycle. By late October, multiple outlets regarded Peltola as one of the 10 most vulnerable incumbents running for reelection in the House. Despite Peltola's loss, she outperformed Kamala Harris in the concurrent 2024 presidential election in Alaska by about 10 points.

Begich was declared the winner on November 20, following the tabulation of ranked-choice votes. He was sworn in on January 3, 2025.

== Candidates ==
=== Democratic Party ===
==== Advanced to general ====
- Eric Hafner, federal prisoner and perennial candidate
- Mary Peltola, incumbent U.S. representative

=== Republican Party ===
==== Advanced to general ====
- Nick Begich III, Alaska Policy Forum board member, grandson of former U.S. Representative Nick Begich Sr., and third-place finisher for U.S. House in 2022

==== Withdrew after advancing to general ====
- Nancy Dahlstrom, lieutenant governor of Alaska
- Matthew Salisbury, property claims adjustor

==== Eliminated in primary ====
- Gerald Heikes, drywall contractor and perennial candidate

=== No Labels ===
==== Eliminated in primary ====
- Richard Grayson, author, former co-chair of the Pinal County, Arizona Green Party, and perennial candidate

=== Alaskan Independence Party ===
==== Advanced to general ====
- John Wayne Howe, chair of the Alaskan Independence Party, candidate for U.S. House in 2022, and nominee for U.S. Senate in 2020

=== Independents ===
==== Eliminated in primary ====
- David Ambrose
- Samuel Claesson, author
- Lady Donna Dutchess, nun, and candidate for U.S. House in 2022
- Richard Mayers

== Primary election ==
=== Endorsements ===
Nick Begich (R)

U.S. senators

- Mike Lee, Utah (2011–present)

U.S. representatives

- Byron Donalds, FL-19 (2021–present)

Individuals

- Vivek Ramaswamy, former CEO of Roivant Sciences and 2024 presidential candidate

Organizations

- Anchorage Young Republicans
- House Freedom Fund
- Mat-Su Young Republicans
Nancy Dahlstrom (R)

Executive branch officials

- Donald Trump, former president of the United States (2017–present) (switched endorsement to Begich after Dahlstrom withdrew)

Statewide officials

- Mike Dunleavy, governor of Alaska (2018–present) (switched endorsement to Begich after Dahlstrom withdrew)

U.S. representatives

- Mike Johnson, speaker of the House (2023–present) from LA-04 (2017–present) (switched endorsement to Begich after Dahlstrom withdrew)
- Elise Stefanik, NY-21 (2015–present) (switched endorsement to Begich after Dahlstrom withdrew)

Organizations

- Congressional Leadership Fund
- National Republican Congressional Committee
Mary Peltola (D)

U.S. senators

- Lisa Murkowski, Alaska (2002–present) (Republican)

Labor unions

- AFSCME Local 52
- Alaska AFL-CIO
- Association of Flight Attendants
- International Brotherhood of Teamsters Local 959
- National Education Association

Organizations

- AIPAC
- Democratic Majority for Israel
- EMILY's List
- Feminist Majority PAC
- Jewish Democratic Council of America
- Joint Action Committee for Political Affairs
- Koniag, Incorporated
- NARAL Pro-Choice America
- National Women's Political Caucus
- NRA Political Victory Fund
- Planned Parenthood Action Fund
- Swing Left

=== Fundraising ===
Campaign finance reports as of July 31, 2024
Candidate	Raised	Spent	Cash on hand
Mary Peltola (D)	$7,541,673	$5,396,920	$2,836,013
Nick Begich (R)	$982,905	$851,591	$172,548
Nancy Dahlstrom (R)	$912,308	$912,308	$317,617
Source: Federal Election Commission

=== Polling ===
==== Top four primary ====
Poll source	Date(s) administered	Sample size (Note: Key: A – all adults RV – registered voters LV – likely voters V – unclear)	Margin of error	Nick Begich (R)	Nancy Dahlstrom (R)	Mary Peltola (D)	Other	Undecided
Data for Progress (D)	February 23 – March 4, 2024	1,120 (LV)	± 3.0%	35%	10%	44%	2% (Note: Chris Bye (L) with 2%)	8%
Remington Research (R) (Note: Poll sponsored by Begich's campaign)	December 11–14, 2023	672 (LV)	± 4.0%	28%	9%	42%	9% (Note: Chris Bye (L) with 7%; Richard Grayson (NL) with 2%)	11%

=== Results ===
Results by state house district: Peltola—70–80% Peltola—60–70% Peltola—50–60% Peltola—40–50% Peltola—30–40% Begich—30–40% Begich—40–50%

Peltola performed well in the primary, securing slightly more than 50% of the vote. She received the plurality of the vote in 33 out of 40 Alaska House of Representatives districts. Her top three districts were the fourth district in Southeast Alaska (79.5% of the vote) as well as the 17th and the 19th districts located in Anchorage (75.3% and 71.0% of the vote respectively).

Blanket primary results
Party	Candidate	Votes	%
Democratic	Mary Peltola (incumbent)	55,166	50.89%
Republican	Nick Begich III	28,803	26.57%
Republican	Nancy Dahlstrom (withdrew)	21,574	19.90%
Republican	Matthew Salisbury (withdrew)	652	0.60%
Independence	John Wayne Howe	621	0.57%
Democratic	Eric Hafner	467	0.43%
Republican	Gerald Heikes	424	0.39%
Independent	Lady Donna Dutchess	195	0.18%
Independent	David Ambrose	154	0.14%
No Labels	Richard Grayson	143	0.13%
Independent	Richard Mayers	119	0.11%
Independent	Samuel Claesson	89	0.08%
Total votes		108,407	100.00%

== General election ==
On August 23, Nancy Dahlstrom withdrew from the general election. Despite initially stating he had no plans to withdraw, Matthew Salisbury also dropped out of the race. They were replaced by fifth-place finisher John Wayne Howe of the Alaskan Independence Party and sixth-place finisher Eric Hafner, a Democrat. Hafner remained on the ballot even though he had never been to Alaska, and was serving a 20-year sentence in a federal penitentiary in New York. The Alaska Democratic Party sued to remove Hafner from the general election ballot, but an Anchorage Superior Court judge dismissed the lawsuit. The party appealed to the Alaska Supreme Court, who upheld the lower court's decision, keeping Hafner on the ballot.

=== Post-primary endorsements ===
Mary Peltola (D)

U.S. senators

- Lisa Murkowski, Alaska (2002–present) (Republican)

Statewide officials

- Gretchen Whitmer, governor of Michigan (2019–present)

Organizations

- Alaska Federation of Natives
- NRA Political Victory Fund
Nick Begich (R)

Executive branch officials

- Donald Trump, former president of the United States (2017–2021) (previously endorsed Dahlstrom)

U.S. senators

- Dan Sullivan, Alaska (2015–present)

U.S. representatives

- Tom Emmer, House majority whip (2023–present) from MN-06 (2015–present)
- Mike Johnson, speaker of the House (2023–present) from LA-04 (2017–present) (previously endorsed Dahlstrom)
- Jim Jordan, OH-04 (2007–present)
- Scott Perry, PA-10 (2013–present)
- Steve Scalise, House majority leader (2023–present) from LA-01 (2008–present)
- Elise Stefanik, NY-21 (2015–present) (previously endorsed Dahlstrom)
- Bruce Westerman, AR-04 (2015–present)

Statewide officials

- Mike Dunleavy, governor of Alaska (2018–present) (previously endorsed Dahlstrom)

Organizations

- Americans for Prosperity Action
- Club for Growth
- Gun Owners of America
- National Federation of Independent Business

Political parties

- Alaska Republican Party

=== Predictions ===
Source	Ranking	As of
The Cook Political Report	Tossup	September 6, 2024
Inside Elections	Tilt R (flip)	October 31, 2024
Sabato's Crystal Ball	Lean R (flip)	November 4, 2024
Elections Daily	Lean R (flip)	November 4, 2024
CNalysis	Tilt D	November 4, 2024
Decision Desk HQ	Tossup	October 22, 2024

=== Polling ===
Poll source	Date(s) administered	Sample size	Margin of error	Mary Peltola (D)	Nick Begich (R)	Other	Undecided
American Viewpoint (R) (Note: Poll sponsored by the NRCC)	September 14–17, 2024	400 (LV)	± 4.9%	40%	44%	6% (Note: "Someone else" with 6%)	10%
Cygnal (R) (Note: Poll sponsored by Begich's campaign and the NRCC)	August 30 – September 1, 2024	400 (LV)	± 4.9%	46%	45%	–	9%
American Viewpoint (R)	Late August 2024	400 (LV)	± 4.9%	45%	39%	–	16%

Poll source	Date(s) administered	Sample size	Margin of error	RCV round	Mary Peltola (D)	Nick Begich (R)	John Wayne Howe (AIP)	Eric Hafner (D)
Cygnal (R)	October 14–16, 2024	400 (LV)	± 4.9%					
Cygnal (R)	October 14–16, 2024	400 (LV)	± 4.9%	1	44.5%	49.1%	4.0%	2.4%
Cygnal (R)	October 14–16, 2024	400 (LV)	± 4.9%	2	45.5%	49.6%	4.8%	Elim
Cygnal (R)	October 14–16, 2024	400 (LV)	± 4.9%	3	47.9%	52.1%	Elim	Elim

Hypothetical polling

Poll source	Date(s) administered	Sample size	Margin of error	RCV round	Mary Peltola (D)	Nick Begich (R)	Nancy Dahlstrom (R)	Chris Bye (L)
Data for Progress (D)	February 23 – March 2, 2024	1,120 (LV)	± 3.0%					
Data for Progress (D)	February 23 – March 2, 2024	1,120 (LV)	± 3.0%	1	47%	39%	12%	3%
Data for Progress (D)	February 23 – March 2, 2024	1,120 (LV)	± 3.0%	2	48%	41%	12%	Elim
Data for Progress (D)	February 23 – March 2, 2024	1,120 (LV)	± 3.0%	3	50%	50%	Elim	Elim

=== Debates and forums ===
2024 Alaska U.S. House of Representatives debates and forums
No.	Date	Host	Moderator	Link	Democratic	Republican	Independence	Democratic
Key: P Participant A Absent N Not invited I Invited W Withdrawn								
Key: P Participant A Absent N Not invited I Invited W Withdrawn					Peltola	Begich	Howe	Hafner
1	Aug. 28, 2024	Alaska Oil and Gas Association	Michelle Egan	YouTube	P	P	N	N
2	Oct. 8, 2024	Kodiak Chamber of Commerce; KMXT (FM)	Terry Haines	YouTube	P	P	P	N
3	Oct. 10, 2024	Alaska Chamber of Commerce			P	P	N	N
4	Oct. 10, 2024	Alaska Public Media; KTUU-TV	Rebecca Palsha; Lori Townsend	YouTube	P	P	N	N

=== Results ===
2024 Alaska's at-large congressional district election
Party	Candidate	First choice		Round 1			Round 2			Round 3	
Party	Candidate	Votes	%	Votes	%	Transfer	Votes	%	Transfer	Votes	%
Republican	Nick Begich III	159,550	48.41%	159,777	48.49%	+267	160,044	48.77%	+4,817	164,861	51.22%
Democratic	Mary Peltola (incumbent)	152,828	46.37%	152,948	46.42%	+1,313	154,261	47.01%	+2,724	156,985	48.78%
Independence	John Wayne Howe	13,010	3.95%	13,210	4.01%	+661	13,871	4.23%	-13,871	Eliminated	
Democratic	Eric Hafner	3,417	1.04%	3,558	1.08%	-3,558	Eliminated				
Write-in		750	0.23%	Eliminated							
Total votes		329,555		329,493			328,176			321,846	
Inactive ballots (Note: Includes overvotes, undervotes, and exhausted ballots where another candidate was not ranked.)		11,426		6,360		+1,317	7,677		+6,330	14,007	
Republican gain from Democratic											

== Notes ==
Partisan clients
