= Willie Kasayulie =

American Yup'ik tribal leader and politician

- Born: June 1, 1951 (age 75); Fairbanks, Alaska, U.S.
- Education: Chemawa Indian School
- Occupations: Tribal leader, politician, commercial fisherman

Willie Kasayulie (born June 1, 1951) is an American tribal leader, politician, and commercial fisherman who served as a Yup'ik chief and co-chair of the Alaska Federation of Natives.

== Life ==
Kasayulie was born June 1, 1951, in Fairbanks, Alaska. He was raised in Akiachak, Alaska. At the age of 13, he left his hometown to attend boarding school. He went to Chemawa Indian School in Oregon, and later a high school in Vermont. He returned to Alaska in 1971 and served in the Alaska Army National Guard for seven years.

By 1988, Kasayuli was a tribal leader and commercial fisherman.

In 1990, he was chairman of the Association of Village Council Presidents (AVCP). He was co-chair of the Alaska Federation of Natives from 1992 to 1993. Kasayulie is proponent of the tribal sovereignty in Alaska and served as chief of Yupiit nation, a coalition of 13 villages. He resigned as AVCP chairman in 1994 citing disagreements with president Myron Naneng.

In 1996, Kasayulie, a registered Democrat, ran as an independent to the Alaska House of Representatives district 39, challenging Democratic incumbent Ivan Ivan. Mary Sattler served as his campaign manager.

In 2020, Kasayulie was awarded an honorary doctorate in education by the University of Alaska Fairbanks, Kuskokwim Campus.

== Electoral history ==
Alaska House of Representatives, District 39, Democratic primary results, 1996
Party	Candidate	Votes	%
Democratic	Ivan Ivan	1,228	39.6
Democratic	Mary K. Sattler	1,172	37.8
WAID	Willie Kasayulie	701	22.6
Total votes		3,101	100
