= Peltola (surname) =

Peltola is a Finnish surname. Notable people with the surname include:

- Buzzy Peltola (1966–2023), American public servant and naturalist
- Juha Peltola (born 1975), Finnish orienteering competitor
- Jukka Peltola (born 1987), Finnish ice hockey player
- Markku Peltola (1956–2007), Finnish actor and musician
- Mary Peltola (born 1973), Yup'ik American politician
- Matti Peltola (born 2002), Finnish professional football player
- Niko Peltola (born 1990), Finnish professional ice hockey defenceman
- Pirjo Peltola (born 1961), Finnish sport shooter
- Timo Peltola (born 1972), Finnish judoka
- Ville-Joonas Peltola (born 1985), Finnish professional ice hockey player
