= Carol and Eric Hafner =

American political activists

Carol Hafner (also known as Kitty Hafner) and her son, Eric G. Hafner, are perennial candidates in the American political system, a mother and son known for running in United States House of Representatives elections in states of which they are not residents or have never visited. This is allowed by Article One of the United States Constitution which only requires that representatives live in the state in which they are chosen when elected, preventing states from requiring that candidates live in the state at the time of filing.

Carol Hafner ran in the Democratic US House of Representatives primary in Alaska in 2018, in the Democratic US House of Representatives primary in Wyoming in 2020, and in the Democratic US Senate primary in Alaska in 2026 without ever having visited either state.

Eric Hafner ran in the Republican US House primary in Hawaii in 2016 and the Democratic US House primary in Oregon in 2018, without ever having visited Oregon. He also ran in Alaska in the 2024 election, advancing as one of two Democratic House candidates in the general election, and as the only Democratic House candidate in the 2026 general election. Eric Hafner's 2024 and 2026 Alaska campaigns were particularly notable as he ran for the office from a federal prison in New York state, having been sentenced in 2022 to 20 years for threatening government officials (and consequently unable to serve as representative if he had been elected). In 2024, he made it to the general election despite a lawsuit by the Alaska Democratic Party to remove him from the ballot. In 2026, Hafner's received 7.9% of the first-choice votes for Alaska's at-large congressional district. His performance played a key role in determining the outcome of the election.

== Eric Hafner ==
Eric Hafner
- Eric Hafner's mugshot from his Federal Bureau of Prisons inmate identification card
- Born: 1991 (age 34–35)
- Height: 6 ft 1 in (185 cm)
- Political party: Democratic
- Criminal status: Incarcerated
- Mother: Carol Hafner
- Website: Official website at the Wayback Machine (archived April 29, 2018)

Eric G. Hafner was born in 1991 in New Jersey. He says he was politically active for other candidates for years, including volunteering for a Democratic presidential campaign when he was 13 years old, then two Republican candidates, Highlands, New Jersey mayor Anna Little's congressional campaign in 2010, and Ron Paul's presidential campaign in 2012. He says he was jailed when he was 16, and since then has been an advocate for drug legalization and criminal justice reform.

Carol Hafner has denied that either she or her son were recruited by Republicans to run for office, and maintained that her son's politics are "progressive through and through", in a 2026 conversation with the New York Times. Nonetheless, a handwritten filing by Eric Hafner in 2025 for a U.S. House of Representative special election listed "MAGA Republicans Victory Fund", "Secure the Border Florida", and "America First Florida Always", as ancillary committees.

=== Hawaii 2016 ===
In 2016, Hafner ran in the Republican party primary for Hawaii's Second Congressional District. He gave his name as Rev. Dr. Eric Hafner, and his occupation as ordained minister, diplomatic adviser and legal consultant, with previous public service experience as medical cannabis policy adviser to Manalapan Township, New Jersey. His residence was listed either as Wailuku, Maui, or a post office box in Hilo, Hawaii. His platform included Hawaiian nationalism, medical cannabis advocacy, and criminal law reform. He came in second, with 5,876 votes, or 44 percent of the Republican primary (the eventual election winner, Tulsi Gabbard, picked up 80,026 votes in the corresponding Democratic party primary).

=== Oregon 2018 ===
In 2018, Hafner ran in the Democratic party primary for the 2018 United States House of Representatives elections in Oregon's Third Congressional District. He was at the time a resident of Toms River, New Jersey, and had never been to the state of Oregon, the closest he had ever come being a trip to Northern California years before. However, he claimed to have the Portland, Oregon mentality, and said his strong New Jersey attitude would enable him to be a more effective advocate for Portland ideals. His campaign motto was "drop acid and vote Hafner for Congress", and his campaign promises included to "light up a joint on the House floor on 4/20". He came in fourth, with 1.5% of the Democratic primary vote.

Hafner said that he ran his 2018 campaign from an undisclosed location in New Jersey, because of outstanding warrants for his arrest from Middletown and Freehold townships for drug and contempt of court charges. He said he had been in hiding since 2013. To communicate, Hafner used Twitter, blocked telephone numbers, and an email account hosted in Switzerland. "Catch me if you can," he said.

=== Arrest and imprisonment ===
In September 2019, Hafner was arrested in an airport on Saipan, in the Northern Mariana Islands, a US territory in the Pacific Ocean. He was brought back to New Jersey, and in October was indicted on multiple charges of threatening to kill or injure elected officials, police officers, lawyers, judges, and their families, that were connected to three court cases that went against him in 2007, 2011, and 2012, and trying to extort $350,000. The indictment said that besides direct death threats to individuals, he made false bomb threats by phone and email to an elected official's office, a county courthouse, a police department, two law firms, and a commercial establishment. He was detained without bail, while his mother Carol said she did not know where the charges came from. In May 2022, Hafner pled guilty to multiple charges, and in December 2022 was sentenced to 20 years in federal prison by judge Zahid Quraishi.

Through 2024, the imprisoned Hafner filed multiple federal lawsuits in forma pauperis charging officials in states including Maine, Nevada, New Mexico, and Vermont with raising unconstitutional barriers to his becoming a candidate in congressional races in their states. None was successful. Hafner's scheduled release date is October 12, 2036, according to the Bureau of Prisons.

=== Alaska 2024 ===
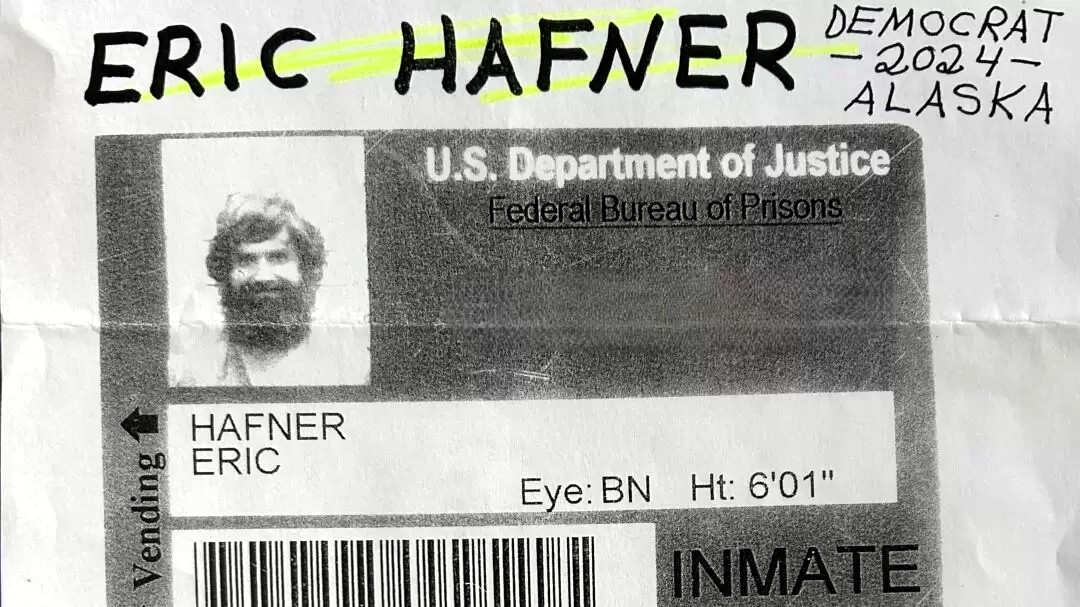
Eric Hafner's 2024 Alaska campaign announcement as sent to KRBD

In 2024, Hafner ran as a Democrat for the open primary for the US House of Representatives seat from Alaska. He announced his candidacy to KRBD community radio station with a letter including a photocopy of his prison ID. He ran his campaign from Federal Correctional Institution, Otisville in New York state, despite the occasional lockdowns and the 15 minute limit on prison phone calls. His mother, Carol, who had run for the same seat in 2018, served as his communication director. He said that he was innocent of the charges he was convicted on, and was appealing his case after making a bad plea deal, and the charges were politically motivated anyway.

Hafner was untroubled by the fact he had never been to Alaska, and observed that being a convicted felon should also not be a hindrance since another convicted felon, Donald Trump, was the current Republican presidential nominee. As for the requirement that he move to Alaska if elected, which might seem to be difficult to achieve since he was not scheduled for parole until 2036, and there were no US federal prisons in Alaska, Hafner said that if he won, he would expect to be released immediately as an extraordinary circumstance under compassionate release law, so would be able to move then.

Hafner got 467 primary votes, for 0.43%, and placed sixth, after Democratic incumbent Mary Peltola, three Republicans, and the candidate of the Alaskan Independence Party. Normally only the top four candidates in the primary would advance to the final election. However, two of the three Republican candidates, third-place finisher Lt. Gov. Nancy Dahlstrom, and fourth-place finisher Matt Salisbury, withdrew after the primary, to avoid splitting the Republican vote, and give second-place Republican finisher Nick Begich III a better chance. This allowed Hafner to advance to the final election in November.

The Alaska Democratic Party sued to have Hafner removed from the ballot, arguing: that he would be unable to be in the state for election day; that he should never have advanced to the ballot from sixth place; and that his presence as a Democrat on the ballot could erroneously take votes from Peltola. The race between Peltola and Begich was seen as extremely close, as was the national race for control of the US House. The Alaska Republican Party and the state opposed the lawsuit. The Anchorage Superior Court and then the Alaska Supreme Court ruled to keep Hafner on the ballot. Hafner, interviewed by telephone from prison, said he had entered the race not to disrupt the election but because of his strong beliefs about climate change, natural resource preservation and rights for Indigenous people, but if his candidacy should cause Peltola to lose, that would not bother him.

In the election, early results appeared to show Hafner winning the Pelican-Elfin Cove precinct, but these results proved erroneous. In final results, Begich defeated Peltola by 48.4% to 46.4% of first choice votes (51.3% to 48.7% of ranked choice votes), while Hafner received 1% of the total votes cast.

=== Alaska 2026 ===
Hafner ran as a Democrat in the 2026 United States House of Representatives election in Alaska, once again advancing to the general election. Hafner was the only Democrat to appear on the general election ballot. Groups backing independent candidate Bill Hill, who had the endorsement of the Alaska Democratic Party, spent over $450,000 on messaging opposing Hafner and informing voters that he was in prison. Ahead of the primary and general elections, some Alaska voters received anonymous pro-Hafner text messages that did not contain the disclosure language required by federal law.

Hafner received 22,874 first-choice votes—around 7.9% of the total. 11,496 Hafner voters did not rank a second candidate, contributing to incumbent Republican Nick Begich III winning reelection. Begich defeated Hill by 7,385 votes in the final round of ranked-choice tabulation and was the only Republican to win a statewide election in Alaska that year.

== Carol Hafner ==
Carol "Kitty" Hafner was born in 1953 or 1954 (age 72–73) She worked as a waitress while attending college, earning a bachelor's degree in family/consumer science and business from Immaculata University in Pennsylvania. Then she worked for years as a flight attendant, for Eastern Airlines (which was dissolved in 1991), then for Northwest Orient Airlines (absorbed by Delta Air Lines). She also spent 14 years as a spokeswoman and media coordinator at the New Jersey Brookdale Community College Holocaust and Genocide Studies Center and Center for World War II Studies.

=== Alaska 2018 ===
In 2018, Hafner ran in the Democratic primary for the US House of Representatives seat from Alaska. She had never been to Alaska, and listed two New Jersey and one South Dakota addresses in her election filing. She was registered as a Democrat in Toms River, New Jersey and a Republican in South Dakota. An Alaska Democratic party leader challenged her candidacy, noting that the New Jersey address matched that of Eric Hafner, who had stood for two previous Congressional offices, and worried that he was using her identity as a sock puppet account for the election. Carol Hafner explained that Eric was her son. In interviews, she said that she traveled frequently, currently residing in New York, and considered her Box Elder, South Dakota address, a mail drop for seniors with transient lifestyles, to be her home base. She said that her impetus to stand for office was Hurricane Sandy, which ravaged the east coast of the United States in 2012, and left her, personally, with enduring health issues. So she was running to deal with the climate change that made such storms more frequent, and against Don Young, the incumbent Republican who had held the office for 45 years, and had called climate change a "scam". She got 5,351 votes to be the Democratic nominee, just under 14%, but was the top vote-getter in one of the 40 state house voting districts in Alaska, which includes Nome and surrounds the Norton Sound, and several voting precincts.

=== Wyoming 2020 ===
In 2019, Hafner was the first Democratic candidate to announce for the 2020 United States House of Representatives election in Wyoming. She had also never been to Wyoming, but, unlike Alaska, planned to visit it for the first time in 2020. She still listed South Dakota as her home base. She called herself a democratic socialist, feminist, and environmentalist, and the issues she supported included the Green New Deal, free tuition for higher education, federal cannabis legalization and Medicare for All. She came in second, receiving 5,172 votes, or 21.94% of the Democratic primary.

=== Alaska 2026 ===
Hafner ran as a Democrat in the 2026 United States Senate election in Alaska. Over the course of the primary campaign, a super PAC called Fair Deal Alaska registered to a virtual office address in Wasilla spent money promoting Hafner and Green Party candidate Richard Grayson—neither of whom lived in Alaska—in what the Alaska Beacon described as an apparent attempt to dilute support for Democrat Mary Peltola in the general election.
