= Nick Begich =

Nick Begich may refer to:

- Nick Begich Sr. (1932–1972), U.S. representative from Alaska's at-large district serving 1971–72
- Nick Begich III (born 1977), U.S. representative from Alaska's at-large district serving 2025–present, grandson of the above
