= Buzzy Peltola =

Native American public servant and naturalist (1966–2023)

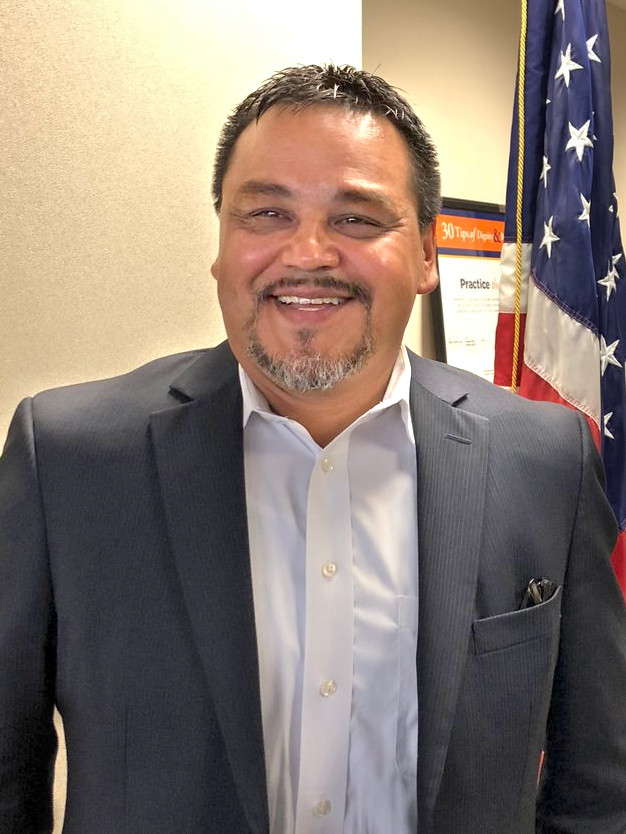
- Peltola in 2018

Regional Director for Alaska for the Bureau of Indian Affairs
- In office July 9, 2018 – July 29, 2022

Member of the Bethel City Council
- In office October 2011 – October 2013

Personal details
- Born: Eugene R. Peltola Jr. February 7, 1966 Bethel, Alaska, U.S.
- Died: September 12, 2023 (aged 57) Alaska, U.S.
- Cause of death: Aviation accident
- Citizenship: United States; Orutsararmiut Native Council
- Spouse: Mary Sattler
- Children: 7
- Education: University of Alaska Fairbanks

Eugene R. "Buzzy" Peltola Jr. (February 7, 1966 – September 12, 2023) was an American public servant and naturalist who served as Alaska director for the Bureau of Indian Affairs and manager of the Yukon Delta National Wildlife Refuge. He was the husband of future Senator-elect Mary Peltola.

== Early life ==
Peltola was born and raised in Bethel, Alaska. He was Alaska Native, with both Yup'ik and Tlingit ancestry. From an early age, he was an accomplished outdoorsman and hunter. He graduated in 1984 from Bethel Regional High School. He studied at the University of Alaska Fairbanks and graduated with a degree in wildlife management.

He was a tribal member of the Orutsararmiut Native Council, based in Bethel. His father, Gene Peltola Sr., was a prominent tribal leader.

The surname Peltola is Finnish. His paternal great-grandparents were from Sievi, Finland.

== Career ==
In the 1980s, Peltola began working for the U.S. Fish and Wildlife Service and led subsistence management programs on all federal lands in Alaska. He also served as the lead staffperson for the U.S. Federal Subsistence Board. In 2004, he earned his commercial pilots license.

He worked for several years as a zone supervisor for Refuge Law Enforcement. Beginning in 2008, he served as the manager of the Yukon Delta National Wildlife Refuge. In 2009, Peltola was a delegate to the federal Whitefish Strategic Planning Group.

Elected in October 2011 with 63% of the vote, Peltola served a term as a council member for the City of Bethel, and was unanimously elected by his council peers as vice-mayor of the city in 2012. In addition to his public service, Peltola served on the corporate boards of the Bethel Native Corporation (a tribal-owned business) and its wholly owned subsidiaries, Bethel Solutions LLC and Bethel Services, Inc.

In 2013, Peltola testified to the U.S. Senate Committee on Energy and Natural Resources in a hearing regarding the Alaska National Interest Lands Conservation Act.

Peltola worked for the Fish and Wildlife Service until 2018. That year he was appointed by U.S. Secretary of the Interior Ryan Zinke as the Regional Director for Alaska in the Bureau of Indian Affairs, overseeing services provided to 227 Alaska Native tribes. In 2019, he was appointed to the Department of the Interior Senior Executive Service Performance Review Board by Secretary Ryan Zinke.

Peltola retired from government service in the summer of 2022, as his wife Mary was running for the U.S. House of Representatives. In the same year, he became the co-founder and CEO of a new company called Alaska Carbon Solutions.

== Death ==
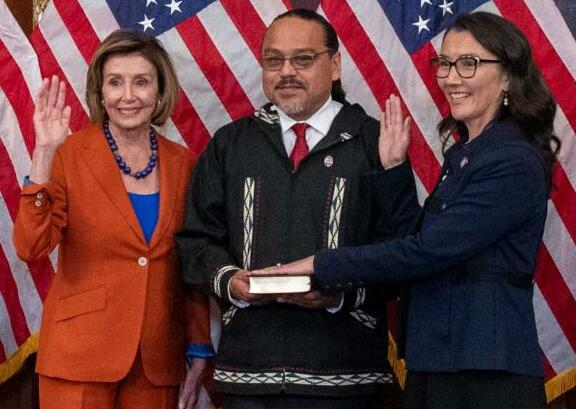
Buzzy Peltola (center) holding the Bible as his wife Mary Peltola (right) is sworn in to the U.S. House of Representatives by Speaker Nancy Pelosi (left)

Buzzy Peltola died a few hours after a plane crash on September 12, 2023, while attempting to pilot a load of moose meat out of a remote hunting camp near St. Mary's, Alaska on a Piper PA-18 Super Cub. He was 57.

Various organizations and officials paid tribute after Peltola's death, including the Alaska Democratic Party, Alaska Federation of Natives, U.S. Secretary of Transportation Pete Buttigieg, Senator Lisa Murkowski, Senator Dan Sullivan, Governor Mike Dunleavy, former Alaska Governor Sarah Palin, House Speaker Kevin McCarthy, House Minority Leader Hakeem Jeffries, and various other members of the House of Representatives.

In a statement released on the official website of the White House Office, President Joe Biden wrote, "Buzzy was a devoted public servant and in the tributes coming from all over the state today, he is being remembered as a friend to all."

Peltola's memorial service was held at Bethel Regional High School on September 16 and attended by over 500 people. Peltola was buried at Bethel Memorial Cemetery with Alaska bush aircraft conducting a ceremonial flyover.

The National Transportation Safety Board found that the crash was caused by the plane being loaded beyond its weight capacity and the attachment of moose antlers to its wings. His wife Mary Peltola filed a wrongful death lawsuit against the owners of the plane in July 2025. At the time of his death, Peltola had been piloting the plane as part of an agreement he made with its owners, two tour operators, to purchase it.

== Works ==
- McCaffery, B. J., and G. Peltola. 1986. "The status of the bristle-thighed curlew on the Yukon Delta National Wildlife Refuge, Alaska." Wader Study Group Bulletin 47:22–25.
