= Peltola =

Peltola may refer to:

- Peltola (surname)
- Peltola, Turku
