= Benjamin Mallott =

Executive

- Education: Oregon State University; American University
- Occupation: Executive
- Employer: Alaska Federation of Natives
- Parent(s): Toni Mallott; Byron Mallott

Benjamin Mallott is an Indigenous American executive. He is the current president of the Alaska Federation of Natives (AFN).

== Early life and education ==
Mallott graduated from Juneau-Douglas High School. He then graduated from Oregon State University and acquired a master's degree from American University.

== Career ==
On October 1, 2024, Mallott became the president of the Alaska Federation of Natives, succeeding Julie Kitka. Previously, he had worked in the organization for 11 years as its Director of Communications, Special Assistant to the President, and Vice President of External Affairs, among other roles. He had also been a Legislative Assistant to Alaska senator Lisa Murkowski.

Mallott also serves on the board of the Alaska Native Heritage Center, the Baan O Yeel Kon Corporation, the Nature Conservancy Alaska, Northern Taiga Ventures, and the Alaska Humanities Forum.

== Personal life ==
Mallott is the son of Toni Mallott, a retired schoolteacher, and former Alaska Lieutenant Governor Byron Mallott, who had also once served as the AFN's president. His brother, Anthony Mallott, was formerly the president of Sealaska Corporation.
