= Lyman Hoffman =

American politician

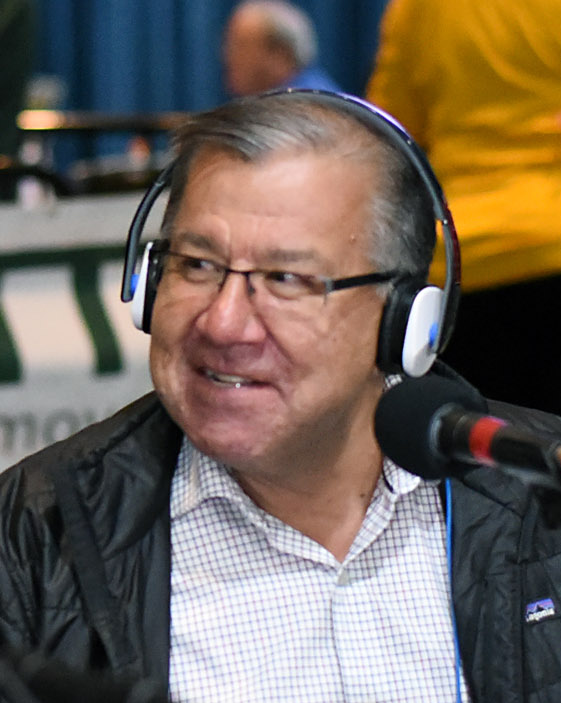
- Hoffman in 2018

Majority Leader of the Alaska Senate
- In office July 9, 2019 – January 19, 2021
- Preceded by: Mia Costello
- Succeeded by: Shelley Hughes

Member of the Alaska Senate
- Incumbent
- Assumed office January 16, 1995
- Preceded by: George Jacko
- Constituency: T (1995–2003); S (2003–present)
- In office January 21, 1991 – January 18, 1993
- Preceded by: John Binkley
- Succeeded by: Rick Halford
- Constituency: M

Member of the Alaska House of Representatives
- In office January 18, 1993 – January 16, 1995
- Preceded by: Constituency established
- Succeeded by: Ivan Ivan
- Constituency: 39
- In office January 19, 1987 – January 21, 1991
- Preceded by: John Binkley
- Succeeded by: Ivan Ivan
- Constituency: 25

Personal details
- Born: February 13, 1950 (age 76) Bethel, Territory of Alaska, U.S.
- Party: Democratic
- Other political affiliations: Republican (caucus)
- Spouse: Lillian
- Children: 2
- Education: University of Alaska, Fairbanks (BA)

Lyman F. Hoffman (born February 13, 1950) is a Yup'ik politician and Democratic member of the Alaska Senate since 1995. He represents the Yukon-Kuskokwim Delta, Alaska Peninsula, and Aleutian Islands. He also served in the Senate from 1991 to 1993 previously, and was a member of the Alaska House of Representatives from 1987−91 and 1993−95.

In January 2019, Hoffman became the longest-serving member in the history of the Alaska Legislature, surpassing the tenure of Jay Kerttula, the previous record holder.

== Partisan affiliation ==
Hoffman was the only registered Democrat to caucus with the Republicans in the Senate from 2015 to 2023. He endorsed Republican nominee Dan Sullivan over Senator Mark Begich during the 2014 U.S. Senate race. From 2007 to 2013 and again since 2023, Hoffman has been a member of a bipartisan majority coalition of Democrats and Republicans.

== Controversy ==
On May 1, 2004, Hoffman was arrested for erratic driving and for striking a home with his car. He refused to take a breathalyzer test and later pled guilty to the charges. He was sentenced to three days in jail by Judge Peter Froehlich, which began on July 6. Hoffman also had his driver's license revoked for 90 days, was placed on probation for one year, and was fined $1,500.

In 2013, Hoffman was found guilty of violating financial disclosure laws by the Senate Committee on Legislative Ethics. Between 2008 and 2010, Hoffman hid between "$311,000 and $690,000" in income from his business interests in a company that primarily contracts with a state-funded agency. From Alaska Public Media, "The committee found that Senator Hoffman "knowingly" prepared and filed incomplete disclosures, leaving out a "substantial" amount of income."

In 2016, Hoffman was the chair of the Senate Finance Committee, whose plan to address the state's fiscal crisis focused on cutting services and capping the Permanent Fund Dividend. Critics note that the hardest hit areas from slashing the PFD are in Hoffman's district. However, Hoffman has also called the dividend the "first call" on revenue from Permanent Fund earnings.

Alaska House of Representatives
Preceded by John Binkley	Member of the Alaska House of Representatives from the 25th district 1987–1991	Succeeded by Ivan Ivan
New constituency	Member of the Alaska House of Representatives from the 39th district 1993–1995	Succeeded by Ivan Ivan
Alaska Senate
Preceded by John Binkley	Member of the Alaska Senate from the M district 1991–1993	Succeeded by Rick Halford
Preceded by George Jacko	Member of the Alaska Senate from the T district 1995–2003	Succeeded by Donny Olson
Preceded by Donny Olson	Member of the Alaska Senate from the S district 2003–present	Incumbent
Preceded by Mia Costello	Majority Leader of the Alaska Senate; 2019–2021	Succeeded by Shelley Hughes
