= Orutsararmiut Traditional Native Council =

Federally recognized Alaska Native tribe

- People: Yup'ik
- Headquarters: Bethel, Alaska, US

Government
- Chief: Walter Jim

Website
- orutsararmiut.org

Orutsararmiut Traditional Native Council (ONC) is the largest tribe in the Bethel, Alaska, region. It is a federally recognized tribe of Yup'ik Alaska Natives and a governing body for the community of Bethel, Alaska.

As of 2017, the tribe had 3,192 citizens, 1,801 of whom lived in Bethel. A majority of those residing outside Bethel lived in Anchorage, Alaska.

== History ==
The Orutsararmiut Native Council (ONC) is the largest tribe in the Bethel, Alaska, region. It is a federally recognized tribe and a governing body for the community of Bethel, Alaska. Zach Brink served as the ONC executive director from 2011 to 2015, when he retired. In 2016, Gene Peltola Sr. was the ONC executive director. Peter Evon also served as an ONC executive director before serving as the Kenaitze Indian Tribe executive director of tribal administration.

As of 2017, the tribe had 3,192 members, 1,801 of whom lived in Bethel. A majority of those not residing in Bethel instead resided in Anchorage, Alaska. In the fall of 2018, the ONC received a two-year grant from the Administration for Community Living to help reduce the harm and maltreatment of Yup'ik elders.

In 2021, the executive director was Mark Springer. Springer was fired in before August 2021, when Zach Brink was rehired and took the office.

On June 28, 2021, the ONC had appealed the Alaska Department of Environmental Conservation's decision about the Donlin Gold mine's water quality certificate. According to a summer 2021 poll of 300 ONC tribal members, 76% opposed the Donlin Gold mine project, while only 10.5% supported it. The mineral rights for the mine are owned by the Calista Corporation, an Alaska Native corporation that represents many Alaska Native groups including the ONC.

In 2021, the ONC received US$17,000,000 from the American Rescue Plan Act of 2021. Some of the funds were used to provide US$1,500 payments to eligible tribal members.

Former executive director Zach Brink resumed the role from August 2, 2021 until late March 2022, when he resigned citing health reasons. In July 2022, Brian Henry became the ONC executive director. In 2022, Walter Jim was serving as the tribal chairman.

In July 2022, the ONC endorsed tribal member Mary Peltola's winning campaign for the 2022 Alaska's at-large congressional district special election. She is a former tribal judge.

== Notable citizens ==
- Buzzy Peltola (1966–2023), public servant and naturalist; Alaska director for the Bureau of Indian Affairs (2018–2022)
- Mary Peltola (born 1973), U.S. Senator, politician, former tribal judge; U.S. representative (2022–2025)
