= Mary Peltola =

Native American politician (born 1973)

- Akalleq
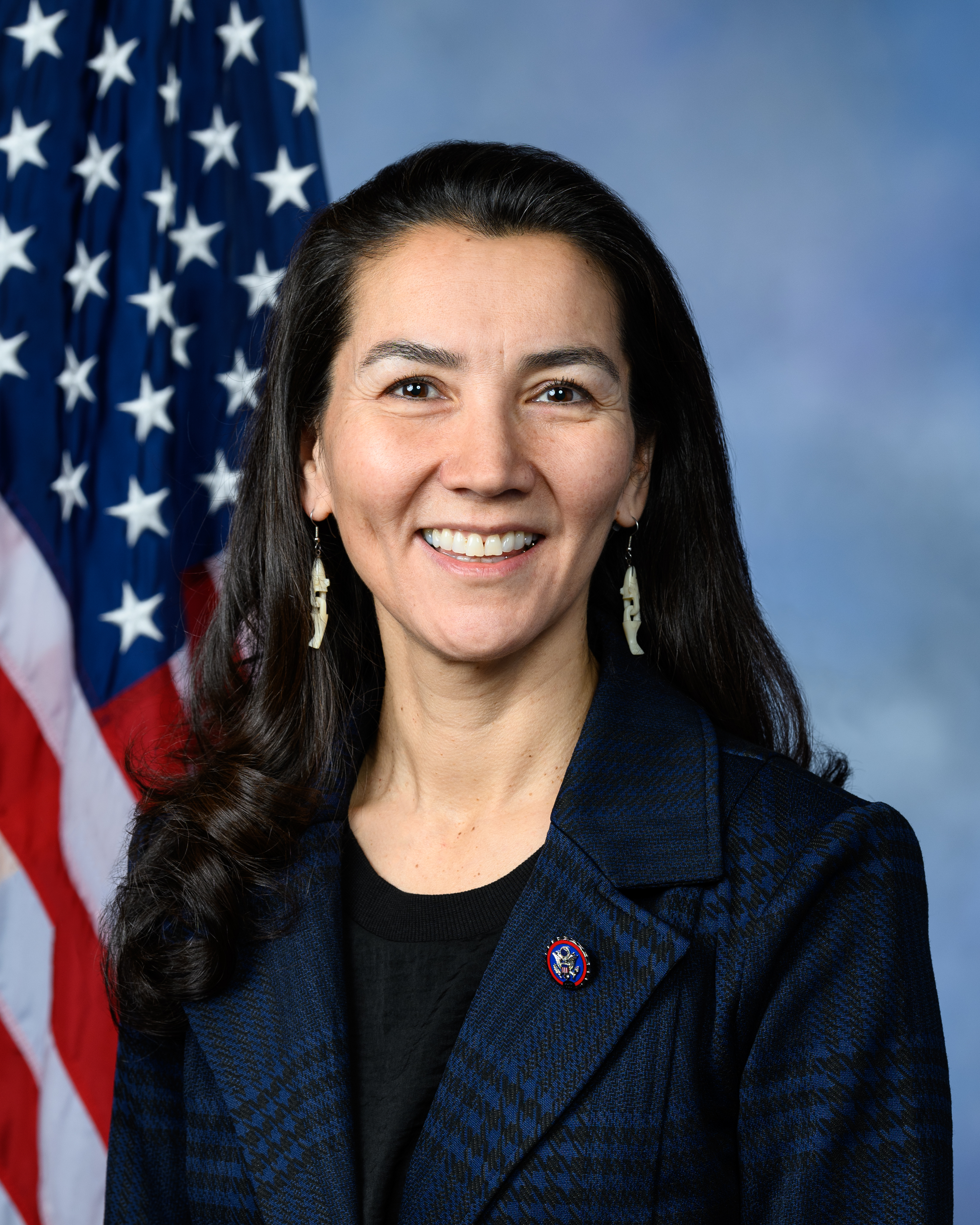
- Official portrait, 2022

United States Senator-elect from Alaska
- Assuming office January 3, 2027
- Succeeding: Dan Sullivan

Member of the U.S. House of Representatives from Alaska's at-large district
- In office August 16, 2022 (Note: Peltola's official service began on the date of the special election, while she was not sworn in until September 13, 2022.) – January 3, 2025
- Preceded by: Don Young
- Succeeded by: Nick Begich III
U.S. House positions
Co-Chair of the Blue Dog Coalition for Policy
In office May 24, 2023 – January 3, 2025
Preceded by	Jim Costa
Succeeded by	Lou Correa

Member of the Alaska House of Representatives
- In office January 19, 1999 – January 19, 2009
- Preceded by: Ivan Ivan
- Succeeded by: Bob Herron
- Constituency: 38th district (2003–2009); 39th district (1999–2003)

Personal details
- Born: Mary Sattler; August 31, 1973 (age 53) Anchorage, Alaska, U.S.
- Citizenship: United States; Orutsararmiut Native Council
- Party: Democratic
- Spouses: Jonathan Kapsner (divorced); Joe Nelson (divorced); Buzzy Peltola (died 2023)
- Children: 4 (Note: Not including three stepchildren)
- Website: Campaign website
- Peltola's voice Peltola supporting a bill to amend the Not Invisible Act of 2019. Recorded December 21, 2022

Mary Sattler Peltola (Note: /pɛlˈtoʊ.lə/ pel-TOH-lə; née Sattler; formerly Nelson and Kapsner; Central Yupik: Akalleq) (born August 31, 1973) is a Native American (Orutsararmiut Native Council) politician and former judge who is a United States senator-elect from Alaska. A member of the Democratic Party, she previously served as the U.S. representative for Alaska's at-large congressional district from 2022 to 2025. Peltola has also been a judge on the Orutsararmiut Native Council's tribal court, executive director of the Kuskokwim River Inter-Tribal Fish Commission, Bethel city councilor, and member of the Alaska House of Representatives.

Peltola was first elected to Congress in an August 2022 special election after the death of incumbent Don Young, defeating Republicans Sarah Palin and Nick Begich III in an upset. Peltola is the first Alaska Native member of Congress, first woman to represent Alaska in the House of Representatives, first person born in Alaska elected to the House, and the first Democrat to serve as Alaska's representative in the House since Nick Begich Sr. in 1972. She was re-elected to a full term in 2022 before losing re-election in 2024 to Nick Begich III.

Peltola was elected to the U.S. Senate in the 2026 election and unseated Republican incumbent Senator Dan Sullivan, becoming the first Democrat to win a U.S. Senate seat in the state since 2008, as well as the first Alaska Native to be elected to the U.S. Senate. Peltola and Peggy Flanagan of Minnesota became the first Native American women elected to the Senate in U.S. history.

== Early life and education ==
Born Mary Sattler, Peltola is Yup'ik from the Yukon–Kuskokwim Delta in Western Alaska and German-American. She was born in Anchorage on August 31, 1973. Her Yup'ik name is Akalleq (transl. the one who rolled). Her father was Ward Sattler, a German American from Nebraska. He moved to Alaska to be a pilot and teacher. Her mother, Elizabeth "LizAnn" Piicigaq Williams, was Yup'ik from Kwethluk, Alaska.

Peltola grew up with her sister along the Kuskokwim River in the communities of Kwethluk, Tuntutuliak, Platinum, and Bethel. As a Yup'ik child, she began fishing with her father at the age of six. Her uncles taught her how to place nets to catch different kinds of fish. When she was 12, her father registered a boat in her name; she began fishing independently as a captain at 14, both harvesting and commercially fishing salmon.

Her parents both worked on Congressman Don Young's special election campaign in 1973, with Ward serving as his district chairman and Elizabeth serving as a Yup'ik interpreter while pregnant with Mary. Peltola later traveled with her father while he campaigned for Young.

Peltola attended high school in Alaska, Pennsylvania, and Colorado before studying elementary education at the University of Northern Colorado from 1991 to 1994. She then attended University of Alaska Fairbanks, University of Alaska Southeast, and the University of Alaska Anchorage from 1994 to 1998, but did not graduate from any college.

During summers while attending college, Peltola worked as a herring and salmon technician for the Alaska Department of Fish and Game. She was also a youth representative to the National Congress of American Indians and founded a Native American student organization at the University of Alaska Southeast.

In 1995, Peltola won the Miss National Congress of American Indians pageant. She performed two Yup'ik dances during the competition, and wore traditional clothing, including a squirrel skin parka, wolf hair headdress, and mukluks as her regalia.

== Early career ==
While attending the University of Alaska Southeast in 1996, Peltola was a legislative intern in the Alaska Legislature. Later that year, she ran for a seat in the Alaska House representing the Bethel region. After losing to incumbent Ivan Ivan by 56 votes, she worked as the campaign manager for Ivan's challenger, Independent candidate Willie Kasayulie, in the general election. Peltola then worked as a reporter for ARCS and Tundra Drums.

== Alaska House of Representatives (1999–2009) ==
In 1998, Peltola was elected to the Alaska House of Representatives, after a successful rematch against Ivan in the Democratic primary. She appeared on the ballot under her maiden name, although she was married to Jonathan Kapsner at the time. She was elected and reelected mostly without or with only minimal opposition. Ivan's return to challenge her in the 2002 primary was the closest contest she faced.

In the House, Peltola served on various standing committees including Finance, Resources and Health and Social Services. She helped to rebuild the Bush Caucus, a bipartisan group of representatives and senators who represent rural and off-road communities in Alaska. In 2004, Peltola criticized No Child Left Behind Act rules which would impede continuing the practice of administering tests in some western Alaskan schools in the Yupik language.

Peltola sponsored a law allowing teachers to be given exemption from jury duty if they work at schools which had failed to meet adequate annual progress. It was signed into law by Governor Frank Murkowski in July 2004.

== Local offices (2009–2022) ==
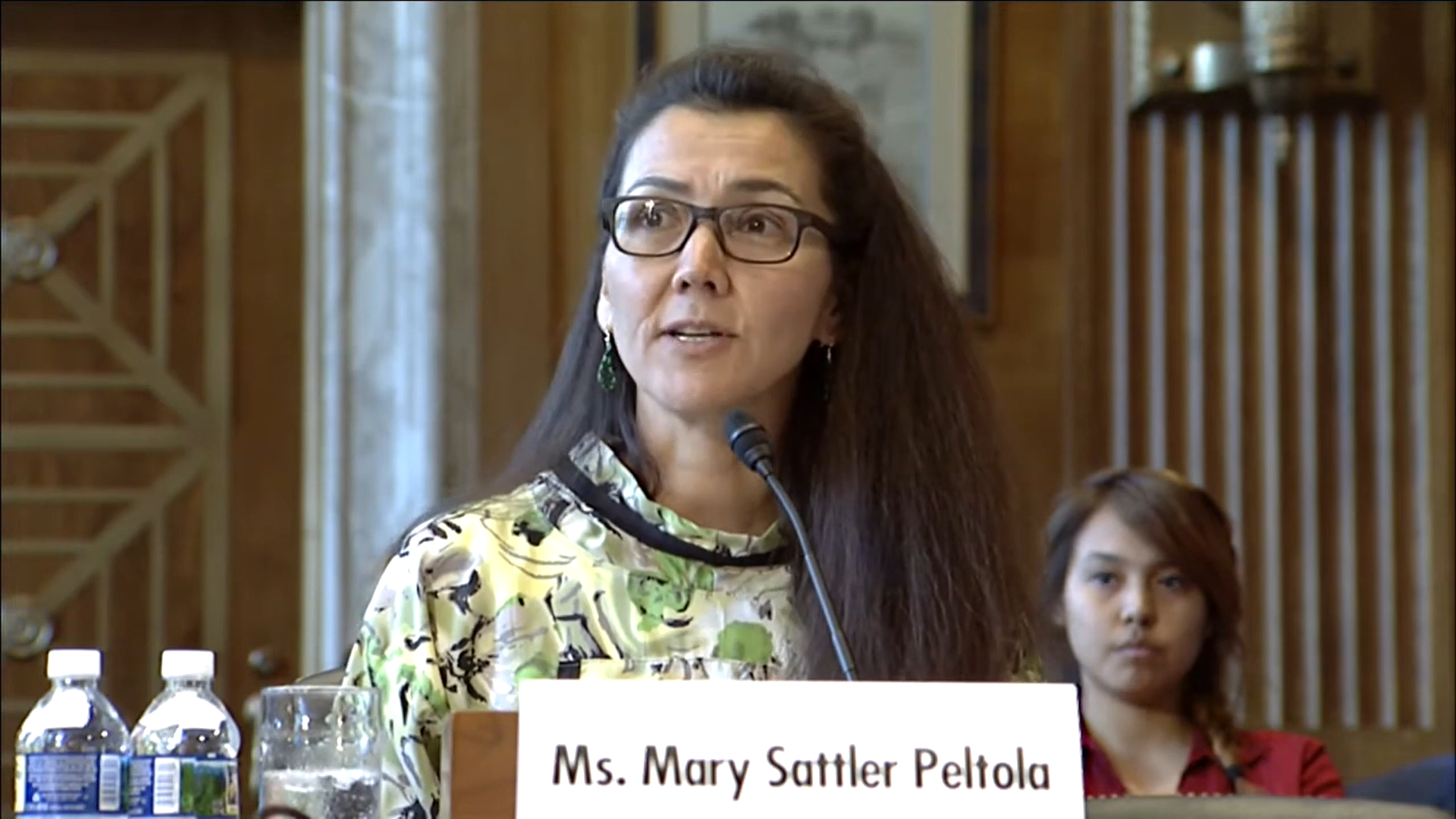
Peltola testifying before the Senate Committee on Indian Affairs, July 2018

Peltola worked as manager of community development and sustainability for the Donlin Creek Mine from 2008 to 2014. In 2010, after incumbent Republican U.S. Senator Lisa Murkowski lost her party's primary, Peltola helped run her successful write-in campaign.

Peltola was elected to the Bethel City Council in 2011, and served until her term ended in 2013. She was a lobbyist in Alaska from 2015 to 2017. After 2016, Peltola served as the executive director of the Kuskokwim River Inter-Tribal Fish Commission. From 2020 to 2021, she served as a judge on the Orutsararmiut Native Council's tribal court.

== U.S. House of Representatives (2022–2025) ==
=== Elections ===
==== 2022 special ====
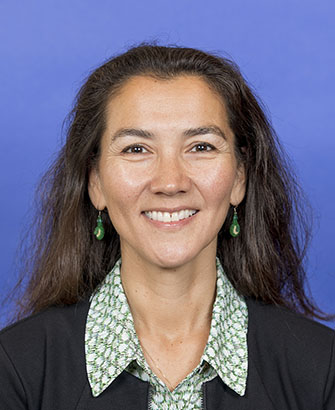
Peltola during the 117th Congress

In August 2022, an Alaska's at-large congressional district special election was conducted under the newly established ranked-choice voting system to fill the seat of Don Young after his death. In the blanket primary there were 48 candidates and the top four finishers advanced to the general election.

Peltola was one of the four candidates advancing and the only Democrat. Al Gross, an independent in third place in the primary, dropped out of the ranked-choice runoff, leaving three candidates in the runoff. The other two candidates were Republicans, former governor Sarah Palin and Nick Begich III. Gross endorsed Peltola and Republican Tara Sweeney after leaving the race. In the first round of ranked choice, Begich was eliminated. Peltola won against Palin in the final runoff.

==== 2022 ====
Peltola sought a full House term in the 2022 general election. She advanced to the general election in first place, receiving 36.8% of the votes in the primary. Alaska Republican Lisa Murkowski, running for her fourth term in the U.S. Senate, told Alaska Federation of Natives Convention delegates that she intended to vote for Peltola as her top choice in the 2022 House election. Murkowski said: "I do not toe the party line just because party leaders have asked... My first obligation is to the people of the state of Alaska."

Ahead of the November 2022 election, Peltola announced endorsements from Don Young's daughters, Joni Nelson and Dawn Vallely, as well as from Don Young's former communications director Zack Brown and several bipartisan political figures. Various other friends and former staff of Don Young endorsed Peltola in a formal endorsement letter. Peltola, who received just under 49% of the vote in initial balloting, was declared the winner on November 23. She defeated Palin again with 55% of the ranked-choice vote. (Votes cast for her as the second-place choice on ballots of the eliminated third-place candidate, Nick Begich III, were added to her total.)

==== 2024 ====
The primary election was held on August 20, 2024. Peltola, along with Republicans Nick Begich III and Nancy Dahlstrom, emerged as the main candidates. After placing third, Dahlstrom withdrew from the race. The four candidates proceeding to the runoff were Begich, Peltola, Alaskan Independence Party candidate John Wayne Howe, and Democrat Eric Hafner.

On November 20, it was announced that Begich had defeated Peltola. In the first round, Begich received 48.42% of the vote against Peltola's 46.36%. After other candidates were eliminated, the final round resulted in Begich receiving 51.3% of the vote against Peltola's 48.7%, making him the winner.

=== Tenure ===
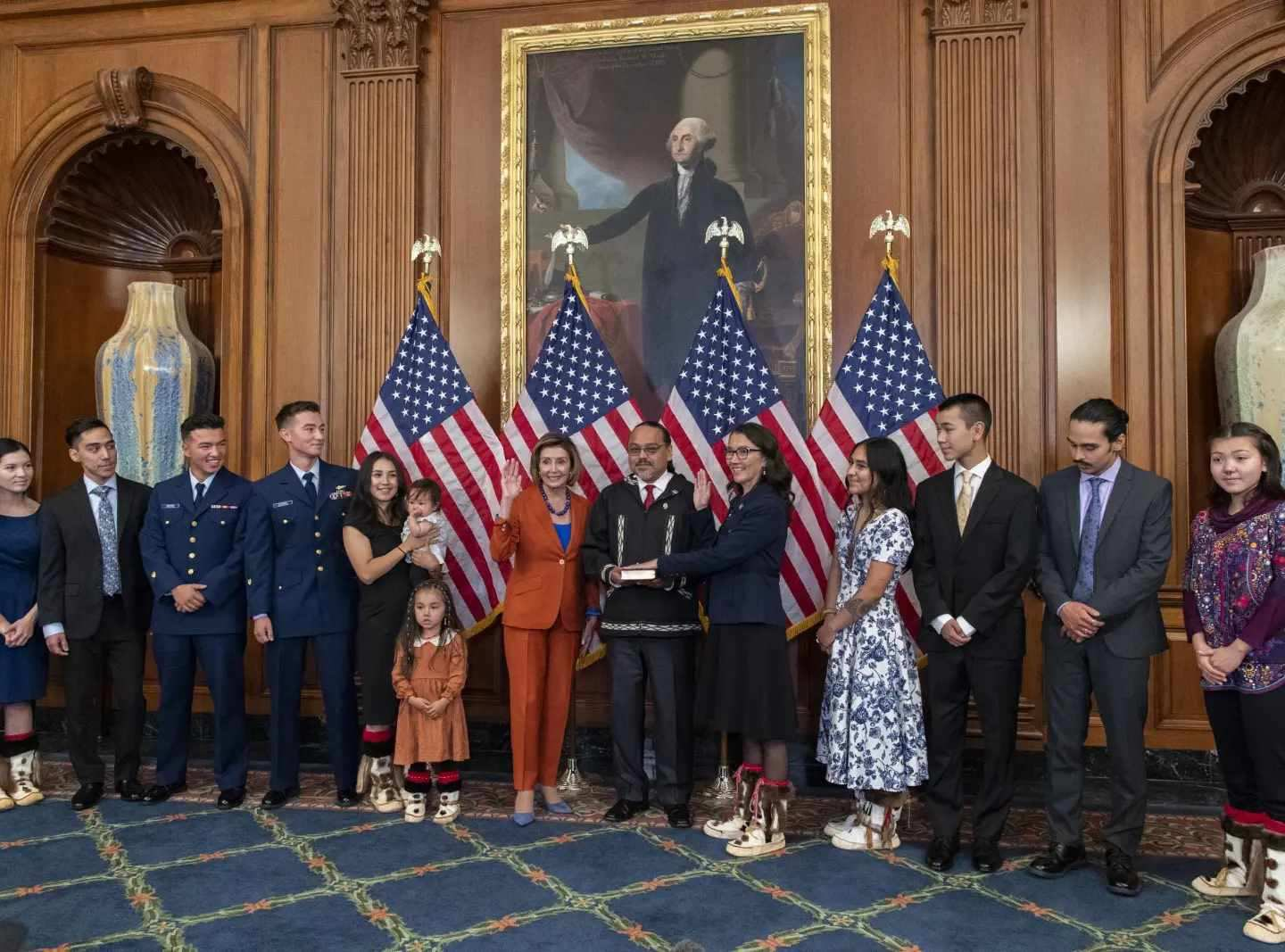
House Speaker Nancy Pelosi swears in Peltola as her husband, Gene "Buzzy" Peltola, and family observe, September 2022

Peltola was sworn in as Alaska's U.S. representative on September 13, 2022. After her swearing in, Congress had an Alaska Native (Peltola), four Native Americans (Sharice Davids, Yvette Herrell, Markwayne Mullin, and Tom Cole); and a Native Hawaiian (Kai Kahele) serving simultaneously for the first time. During the 117th Congress, she was appointed to the House Natural Resources Committee and the Education and Labor Committee.

On September 29, 2022, the first bill sponsored by Peltola was passed through the House. It creates an Office of Food Security in the Department of Veterans Affairs. The bill passed the House in a 376–49 vote. During the 2022 United States railroad labor dispute, Peltola was one of eight House Democrats to vote against a bill that would impose a new contract on railroad workers; several rail unions were voting against it. She said she could not support a contract that did not include paid sick days. Peltola voted for the Respect for Marriage Act, passed in December 2022, a law protecting same-sex marriage and religious liberty. It also codified the recognition of interracial marriage as provided by Loving v. Virginia.

During the January 2023 Speaker of the United States House of Representatives election, Peltola supported House Democratic leadership. However, she said, "If there are members who want to form a coalition majority like we often see in Alaska, I'm open to discussing that. Anything that gets us communicating with each other rather than talking at each other would be a good thing at this point." In February 2023, Peltola announced that she had chosen Josh Revak, a former Republican state senator who was a competitor in the 2022 special election, to run her Alaska office. Peltola's congressional staffers included Republicans. Her chief of staff, Alex Ortiz, was chief of staff to her Republican predecessor Don Young. In April 2023, Ortiz left her congressional office to take a position with her campaign in Southeast Alaska.

Peltola was among the top ten legislators who were most frequently absent from Congress, and missed more than 18 percent of the votes. In 2023, Peltola's office ranked second-highest in staff turnover for the U.S. House of Representatives, with a turnover four times the House average. After she joined the House in September 2022, much of her staff had been carried over from her Republican predecessor on a temporary basis. Still, "only five of the two dozen staff members who left her office before the end of her tenure had been working for Mr. Young", according to the LegiStorm research organization. The New York Times also reported that Peltola "required" aides to care for her family's pet chameleon, including purchasing and feeding it live crickets, both at her home and office, as well as catching escaped crickets.

In 2024, she supported several Republican-led immigration and crime-related measures, including a bill to deport undocumented migrants who assault police officers. She voted to condemn President Biden's handling of the southern border. She also backed legislation limiting the District of Columbia's authority over its sentencing laws.

In May 2024, Peltola introduced the Bottom Trawl Clarity Act and the Bycatch Reduction and Mitigation Act as a result of declining salmon returns in western Alaska and concerns about salmon bycatch in pollock trawling in the Bering Sea. If passed, the bipartisan bills would limit bottom trawling to designated areas and expand NOAA research in bycatch reduction.

=== Committee assignments ===
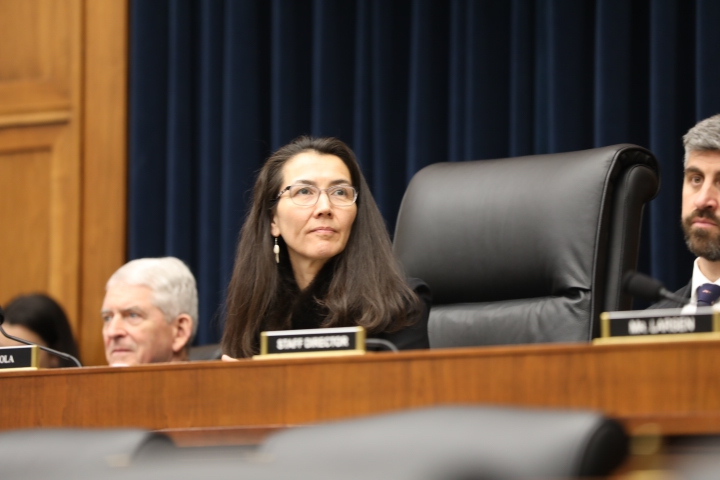
Peltola in a Transportation and Infrastructure Committee, December 2023

For the 118th Congress:

- Committee on Natural Resources
  - Subcommittee on Federal Lands
  - Subcommittee on Water, Wildlife and Fisheries
- Committee on Transportation and Infrastructure
  - Subcommittee on Aviation
  - Subcommittee on Coast Guard and Maritime Transportation

=== Caucus memberships ===
- Blue Dog Coalition
- Congressional Caucus for the Equal Rights Amendment
- Problem Solvers Caucus

== U.S. Senate ==
==== 2026 U.S. Senate campaign ====
Throughout 2025, Peltola was seen as being a possible contender for governor or U.S. senator for the 2026 elections. On January 12, 2026, Peltola declared her candidacy for the U.S. Senate seat held by incumbent Senator Dan Sullivan. She is one of the top candidates recruited to run by Senate Minority Leader Chuck Schumer.

In September 2026, The New York Times reported, based on interviews with nine former staffers who spoke anonymously, as well as text messages and photos, that Peltola had angry and profane outbursts at aides during her time in Congress and her Senate campaign. Four former staffers said they had heard her use an anti-gay slur, which the campaign denied. The campaign said she regretted using a slur for people with intellectual disabilities, which appeared in a text message viewed by the Times. The report also said that she shoved a male aide in February 2024, which the campaign described as an accidental bump, and that several longtime aides were fired or reassigned days before the August primary. A campaign spokesperson denied any pattern of abusive behavior, said that Peltola had "sometimes struggled to deal with her grief" after the deaths of her mother and husband in 2023, and called the accounts "exaggerating and outright lying about moments from the hardest period of her life". A super PAC supporting Sullivan subsequently used the report in an ad opposing Peltola.

In October 2026, The New York Times reported that operatives connected to Peltola's campaign recruited challenger Daniel J. Sullivan Jr. in an effort to split votes from incumbent Daniel S. Sullivan. Peltola denied involvement, and Dan Sullivan Jr. maintained that he entered the race of his own volition. The New York Times based its reporting on interviews with a dozen sources, including text messages exchanged by operatives and reviewed by its reporters, as well as documents prepared for a lawsuit against the campaign by Peltola's former campaign manager. State and federal officials pledged to launch an investigation. However, various reports indicate "ballot stacking" efforts have historically occurred in the state by both major parties, and is not generally illegal. At the same time, such "ballot stacking" normally involves adding more overall candidates, as opposed to searching for and using others with the same name as the existing candidate.

On November 18, 2026, the Associated Press called the Senate race for Peltola. Her win made her the first Alaska Native elected to the Senate, as well as the first Democrat since 2008 to win a Senate seat in Alaska.

== Political positions ==
Peltola is a moderate Blue Dog Democrat. According to Govtrack, Peltola's voting record in the 118th Congress (2023–2025) was more liberal than 13 Democratic House members, and less liberal than the 199 other Democratic House members.

She often broke the Democratic party line while serving in the U.S. House. She has praised Alaska's bipartisan coalitions. In 2024, she commended Alaska's "politically balanced delegation" to Congress. Peltola's 2026 platform has been said to be populist.

=== Institutional reforms ===
Peltola has advocated for reforms of U.S. political institutions. She supports term limits, stricter campaign finance laws, and more limits on insider trading for members of U.S. Congress. In 2026, she criticized the 119th United States Congress, saying there should have been more checks and balances during the second presidency of Donald Trump. She said, "We have got to have a Congress that doesn't just cede all of their power."

=== Consumer protection ===
Peltola supports using antitrust law to prevent monopolies. In 2023, she opposed the attempted corporate merger between Kroger and Albertsons, the respective parent companies of Fred Meyer and Carrs-Safeway grocery stores. Peltola said the merger would reduce competition in Alaska's grocery market and she asked the Federal Trade Commission (FTC) to intervene. The FTC challenged the merger in February 2024 and Peltola signed an amicus brief in support of the FTC's court case. As of December 2024, the merger was canceled.

Peltola also supports the right to repair.

=== Energy ===
Peltola has supported new oil and gas projects. She supported the ConocoPhillips Willow Project and increased oil development within the National Petroleum Reserve–Alaska. She successfully persuaded the White House and the Interior Department to approve the project.

She supports reforms so that federal permits for infrastructure and energy projects are issued more quickly. Peltola said it would benefit both renewable and petroleum projects.

=== Fisheries ===
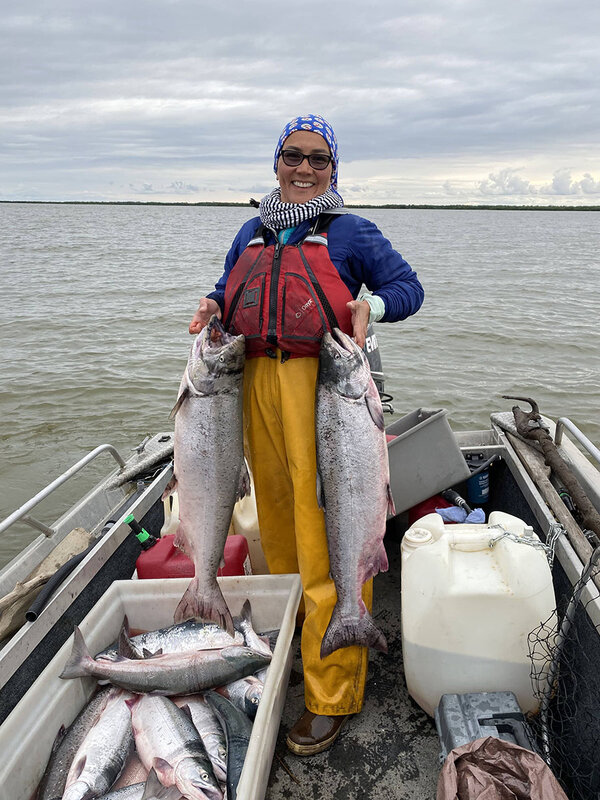
Peltola fishing in Alaska, June 2023

Peltola has focused on fisheries in her election campaigns. She supports reforming the Magnuson–Stevens Fishery Conservation and Management Act, to better protect fisheries and marine ecosystems. She believes that the act's focus on "optimum yield" has privileged economic considerations over environmental ones. She supports amending the act to prioritize the environment.

=== Gun rights ===
In her 2024 reelection campaign, Peltola was endorsed by the National Rifle Association (NRA). That made her the only Democratic candidate for Congress endorsed by the group during that election cycle. In a 2022 interview with the Anchorage Daily News, she said "guns are a part of Alaska's culture and a core tool of a subsistence lifestyle", adding she grew up hunting and would continue to defend Alaskans' right to own firearms. In another 2022 interview with the PBS News Hour, she described herself as an "avid hunter" and stated she had "176 long guns in my home".

=== Healthcare ===
Peltola supports extending Affordable Care Act premium subsidies and opposes Medicaid cuts. In 2022, she said she would "protect Medicaid expansion". She said she supports a public option in healthcare. She is pro-choice and supports codifying Roe v. Wade.

=== Land management ===
In 2022, Peltola supported legislation transferring 360,000 acres of federal land to the University of Alaska, which was owed to the university as a land-grant school.

=== LGBTQ+ rights ===
In April 2023, Peltola voted against the Protection of Women and Girls in Sports Act, which would have changed the definition of "sex" in Title IX and barred transgender students in federally funded schools from participating in sports on the team that aligns with their gender identity. She said the bill was "bullying" and "federal overreach". Referring to the bill's focus on the transgender community, Peltola said, "I don't know why on earth, as adults and national leaders, we'd be piling on and targeting them, and trying to make their lives even harder."

=== Foreign policy ===
Peltola supported giving U.S. aid to Ukraine after the Russian invasion, providing military and humanitarian assistance without deploying American troops. Peltola said Ukraine was "fighting for its right to exist as a free country".

During her time in the House, Peltola voted in favor of various sanctions on Iran.

In May 2026, Peltola said she would have voted for a war powers resolution to limit the 2026 Iran war. On the topic of foreign policy of the second Trump administration, she said, "Our system was designed for a balance of powers. Clearly, there is not a balance of power right now. Clearly this administration has an outsized role in the direction, whether it's tariffs or wars."

==== Israel–Palestine ====
Peltola broke with her party to vote for measures providing military aid to Israel during her tenure in the U.S. House, including a February 2024 standalone package which would have provided $17.6 billion in military aid. President Joe Biden and Democratic leadership opposed the standalone bill, preferring to combine it with aid to Ukraine and Taiwan. The combined aid package ultimately passed as Public Law 118-50. Jewish Insider said that, while Peltola was "not a leader on Middle East policy issues during her time in the House," she was a reliable supporter of Israel in terms of her voting record.

Peltola voted for resolutions describing anti-Zionism as antisemitism and to condemn the phrase "from the river to the sea."

During her 2026 Senate campaign, Peltola largely avoided the topic of Israel and did not say whether her support for Israel had changed, instead emphasizing her opposition to the Iran war.

== Personal life ==
Peltola was the first U.S. representative from Alaska to be born in the state, and is a member of the Orutsararmiut Native Council. She is an Orthodox Christian and belongs to the Orthodox Church in America. As such, she has familiarity with speaking Russian in addition to English and Yupik.

Peltola has four biological children; she had two sons with her first husband, and a son and a daughter with her second. She has three stepchildren, all from her third marriage. Her first husband was Jonathan Kapsner, and her second husband was Joe Nelson. Her third husband, Eugene "Buzzy" Peltola Jr., served as Alaska director for the Bureau of Indian Affairs, and died in September 2023 after the plane he was piloting crashed, later ruled by the NTSB to have been caused by the plane having been overloaded. In 2025, Mary Peltola sued the company that owned the aircraft. On October 24, 2026, Peltola and her family suffered minor injuries in a car crash.

== Electoral history ==
=== State house elections ===
1996 Alaska House of Representatives, district 39, Democratic primary election
Party	Candidate	Votes	%
Democratic	Ivan Ivan (incumbent)	1,228	39.6
Democratic	Mary Sattler	1,172	37.8
Western Alaska Independent Democrat	Willie Kasayulie	701	22.6
Total votes		3,101	100

1998 Alaska House of Representatives, district 39, Democratic primary election
Party	Candidate	Votes	%
Democratic	Mary Sattler	1,667	53.41
Democratic	Ivan Ivan (incumbent)	1,233	39.51
Western Alaska Independent	Dario Notti	221	7.08
Total votes		3,121	100

1998 Alaska House of Representatives, district 39, general election
Party	Candidate	Votes	%
Democratic	Mary Sattler	3,287	72.18
Western Alaska Independent	Dario Notti	1,210	26.57
Write-in		57	1.25
Total votes		4,554	100

2000 Alaska House of Representatives, district 39, Democratic primary election
Party	Candidate	Votes	%
Democratic	Mary Kapsner (incumbent)	1,201	100
Total votes		1,201	100

2000 Alaska House of Representatives, district 39, general election
Party	Candidate	Votes	%
Democratic	Mary Kapsner (incumbent)	4,321	97.5
Write-ins		111	2.5
Total votes		4,432	100

2002 Alaska House of Representatives, district 38, Democratic primary election
Party	Candidate	Votes	%
Democratic	Mary Kapsner (incumbent)	918	64.51
Democratic	Ivan Ivan	505	35.49
Total votes		1,423	100%

2002 Alaska House of Representatives, district 38, general election
Party	Candidate	Votes	%
Democratic	Mary Kapsner (incumbent)	3,419	97.28
Write-ins		93	2.72
Total votes		3,419	100

2004 Alaska House of Representatives, district 38, Democratic primary election
Party	Candidate	Votes	%
Democratic	Mary Kapsner (incumbent)	1,538	100
Total votes		1,538	100

2004 Alaska House of Representatives, district 38, general election
Party	Candidate	Votes	%
Democratic	Mary Kapsner (incumbent)	3,935	97.84
Write-ins		87	2.16
Total votes		3,935	100

2006 Alaska House of Representatives, district 38, Democratic primary election
Party	Candidate	Votes	%
Democratic	Mary Sattler Kapsner (incumbent)	1,451	100
Total votes		1,451	100

2006 Alaska House of Representatives, district 38, general election
Party	Candidate	Votes	%
Democratic	Mary Sattler Kapsner (incumbent)	3,553	97.40
Write-ins		95	2.60
Total votes		3,648	100

=== Bethel City Council elections ===
2011 Bethel City Council election
Candidate	Votes	%
Joseph A. Klejka	504	14.35
Mary Sattler	441	12.55
Richard D. Robb	436	12.41
Gene Peltola Jr.	434	12.35
Kent Harding	419	11.93
Mark Springer	310	8.82
Eric G. Whitney	283	8.06
Eric Middlebrook	277	7.88
Sharon D. Sigmon	273	7.77
Write-in	136	3.87

Note: The election was to fill four seats with two-year terms and two seats with one-year terms. Candidates were given the choice of which seat to fill on the basis of their vote count, with the highest vote count given first preference to decide which length of a term they wanted to fill. Mary Sattler (Peltola), Richard D. Robb, Gene Peltola Jr., and Mark Springer filled two-year terms while Joseph A. Klejka and Kent Harding filled one-year terms.

=== U.S. House elections ===
2022 Alaska's at-large congressional district special primary election results
Party	Candidate	Votes	%
Republican	Sarah Palin	43,601	27.01
Republican	Nick Begich	30,861	19.12
Independent	Al Gross (Note: Gross withdrew from the general election following his victory in the primary.)	20,392	12.63
Democratic	Mary Peltola	16,265	10.08
Republican	Tara Sweeney	9,560	5.92
Independent	Santa Claus	7,625	4.72
Democratic	Christopher Constant	6,224	3.86
Independent	Jeff Lowenfels	5,994	3.71
Republican	John Coghill	3,842	2.38
Republican	Josh Revak	3,785	2.34
Independent	Andrew Halcro	3,013	1.87
Democratic	Adam Wool	2,730	1.69
Democratic	Emil Notti	1,777	1.10
Libertarian	Chris Bye	1,049	0.65
Democratic	Mike Milligan	608	0.38
Independence	John Howe	380	0.24
Independent	Laurel Foster	338	0.21
Republican	Stephen Wright	332	0.21
Republican	Jay Armstrong	286	0.18
Libertarian	J. R. Myers	285	0.18
Independent	Gregg Brelsford	284	0.18
Democratic	Ernest Thomas	199	0.12
Republican	Bob Lyons	197	0.12
Republican	Otto Florschutz	193	0.12
Republican	Maxwell Sumner	133	0.08
Republican	Clayton Trotter	121	0.07
Independent	Anne McCabe	118	0.07
Republican	John Callahan	114	0.07
Independent	Arlene Carle	107	0.07
Independent	Tim Beck	96	0.06
Independent	Sherry Mettler	92	0.06
Republican	Tom Gibbons	94	0.06
Independent	Lady Donna Dutchess	87	0.05
American Independent	Robert Ornelas	83	0.05
Independent	Ted Heintz	70	0.04
Independent	Silvio Pellegrini	70	0.04
Independent	Karyn Griffin	67	0.04
Independent	David Hughes	54	0.03
Independent	Don Knight	46	0.03
Republican	Jo Woodward	44	0.03
Independent	Jason Williams	37	0.02
Independent	Robert Brown	36	0.02
Independent	Dennis Aguayo	31	0.02
Independent	William Hibler III	25	0.02
Republican	Bradley Welter	24	0.01
Independent	David Thistle	23	0.01
Independent	Brian Beal	19	0.01
Republican	Mikel Melander	17	0.01
Total votes		161,428	100.0

2022 Alaska's at-large congressional district special election
Party	Candidate	Round 1			Round 2	
Party	Candidate	Votes	%	Transfer	Votes	%
Democratic	Mary Peltola	74,817	39.66%	+15,467	91,266	51.48%
Republican	Sarah Palin	58,339	30.92%	+27,053	86,026	48.52%
Republican	Nick Begich	52,536	27.85%	-52,536	Eliminated	
Write-in		2,974	1.58%	-2,974	Eliminated	
Total votes		188,666	100.00%		177,423	94.04%
Inactive ballots		0	0.00%	+11,243	11,243	5.96%
Democratic gain from Republican						

2022 Alaska U.S. House of Representatives primary election results
Party	Candidate	Votes	%
Democratic	Mary Peltola	70,295	36.80
Republican	Sarah Palin	57,693	30.20
Republican	Nick Begich	50,021	26.19
Republican	Tara Sweeney (withdrew)	7,195	3.77
Libertarian	Chris Bye (Note: Chris Bye placed fifth in the nonpartisan primary. However, the fourth-place finisher — Tara Sweeney — withdrew, placing Bye in the general election.)	1,189	0.62
Libertarian	J. R. Myers	531	0.28
Republican	Bob Lyons	447	0.23
Republican	Jay Armstrong	403	0.21
Republican	Brad Snowden	355	0.19
Republican	Randy Purham	311	0.16
Independent	Lady Donna Dutchess	270	0.14
Independent	Sherry Strizak	252	0.13
American Independent	Robert Ornelas	248	0.13
Republican	Denise Williams	242	0.13
Independent	Gregg Brelsford	241	0.13
Independent	David Hughes	238	0.12
Independent	Andrew Phelps	222	0.12
Independent	Tremayne Wilson	194	0.10
Independent	Sherry Mettler	191	0.10
Independent	Silvio Pellegrini	187	0.10
Independent	Ted Heintz	173	0.09
Independent	Davis LeBlanc	117	0.06
Total votes		191,015	100.00

2022 Alaska's at-large congressional district election
Party	Candidate	Round 1			Round 2			Round 3	
Party	Candidate	Votes	%	Transfer	Votes	%	Transfer	Votes	%
Democratic	Mary Peltola (incumbent)	128,329	48.68%	+1,038	129,433	49.20%	+7,460	136,893	54.94%
Republican	Sarah Palin	67,732	25.74%	+1,064	69,242	26.32%	+43,013	112,255	45.06%
Republican	Nick Begich	61,431	23.34%	+1,988	64,392	24.48%	-64,392	Eliminated	
Libertarian	Chris Bye	4,560	1.73%	-4,560	Eliminated				
Write-in		1,096	0.42%	-1,096	Eliminated				
Total votes		263,148	100.00%		263,067	100.00%		249,148	100.00%
Inactive ballots		2,193	0.83%	+906	3,097	1.16%	+14,765	17,016	5.55%
Democratic hold									

2024 Alaska U.S. House of Representatives primary election results
Party	Candidate	Votes	%
Democratic	Mary Peltola (incumbent)	55,166	50.9
Republican	Nick Begich III	28,803	26.6
Republican	Nancy Dahlstrom (withdrew)	21,574	19.9
Republican	Matthew Salisbury (withdrew)	652	0.6
Independence	John Wayne Howe	621	0.6
Democratic	Eric Hafner	467	0.4
Republican	Gerald Heikes	424	0.4
Independent	Lady Donna Dutchess	195	0.2
Independent	David Ambrose	154	0.1
No Labels	Richard Grayson	143	0.1
Independent	Richard Mayers	119	0.1
Independent	Samuel Claesson	89	0.1
Total votes		108,407	100.00

2024 Alaska's at-large congressional district election
Party	Candidate	First choice		Round 1			Round 2			Round 3	
Party	Candidate	Votes	%	Votes	%	Transfer	Votes	%	Transfer	Votes	%
Republican	Nick Begich III	159,550	48.41%	159,777	48.49%	+267	160,044	48.77%	+4,817	164,861	51.22%
Democratic	Mary Peltola (incumbent)	152,828	46.37%	152,948	46.42%	+1,313	154,261	47.01%	+2,724	156,985	48.78%
Independence	John Wayne Howe	13,010	3.95%	13,210	4.01%	+661	13,871	4.23%	-13,871	Eliminated	
Democratic	Eric Hafner	3,417	1.04%	3,558	1.08%	-3,558	Eliminated				
Write-in		750	0.23%	Eliminated							
Total votes		329,555		329,493			328,176			321,846	
Inactive ballots (Note: Includes overvotes, undervotes, and exhausted ballots where another candidate was not ranked.)				6,360		+1,317	7,677		+6,330	14,007	
Republican gain from Democratic											

== See also ==
- List of Native American jurists
- List of Native Americans in the United States Congress
- Native American women in politics
- Women in the United States House of Representatives

== Notes ==
U.S. House of Representatives
Preceded by Don Young	Member of the U.S. House of Representatives from Alaska's at-large congressional district 2022–2025	Succeeded by Nick Begich
Party political offices
Preceded by Jim Costa	Chair of the Blue Dog Coalition for Policy; 2023–2025; Served alongside: Jared Golden (Administration), Marie Pérez (Communications)	Succeeded by Lou Correa
Preceded by Al Gross; Endorsed	Democratic nominee for U.S. Senator from Alaska (Class 2); 2026	Most recent
U.S. Senate
Preceded by Dan Sullivan	U.S. Senator (Class 2) from Alaska; Taking office 2027; Served alongside: Lisa Murkowski	Elect
U.S. order of precedence (ceremonial)
Preceded by Ron Barber as Former U.S. Representative	Order of precedence of the United States as Former U.S. Representative	Succeeded by Kai Kahele as Former U.S. Representative
