= Ivan Ivan (politician) =

American politician

Ivan M. Ivan

Member of the Alaska House of Representatives
- In office 1995–1999
- Preceded by: Lyman Hoffman
- Succeeded by: Mary Peltola
- Constituency: 39th district
- In office 1991–1993
- Preceded by: Lyman Hoffman
- Succeeded by: Ed Willis
- Constituency: 25th district

Personal details
- Born: August 17, 1945 (age 80) Akiak, Alaska Territory
- Party: Democratic
- Spouse: Helen
- Children: 6

Ivan M. Ivan (born August 17, 1945) is an American politician and tribal leader in the state of Alaska. Elected as a Democrat who caucused with Republicans, he served in the Alaska House of Representatives from 1991 to 1993 (25th district) and 1995 to 1999 (39th district).

== Early life ==
A Yup'ik, Ivan was born in Akiak, Alaska, and is a subsistence fisherman and hunter.

== Career ==
Prior to his election to the House of Representatives, he served as city administrator of Akiak from 1987 to 1990. During his final term in the Alaska House, he served on the Community & Regional Affairs and Military and Veterans Affairs committees.

Ivan is also a tribal leader and community chief of Akiak, and speaks both Yup'ik and English.
