= Alaska Policy Forum =

American think tank

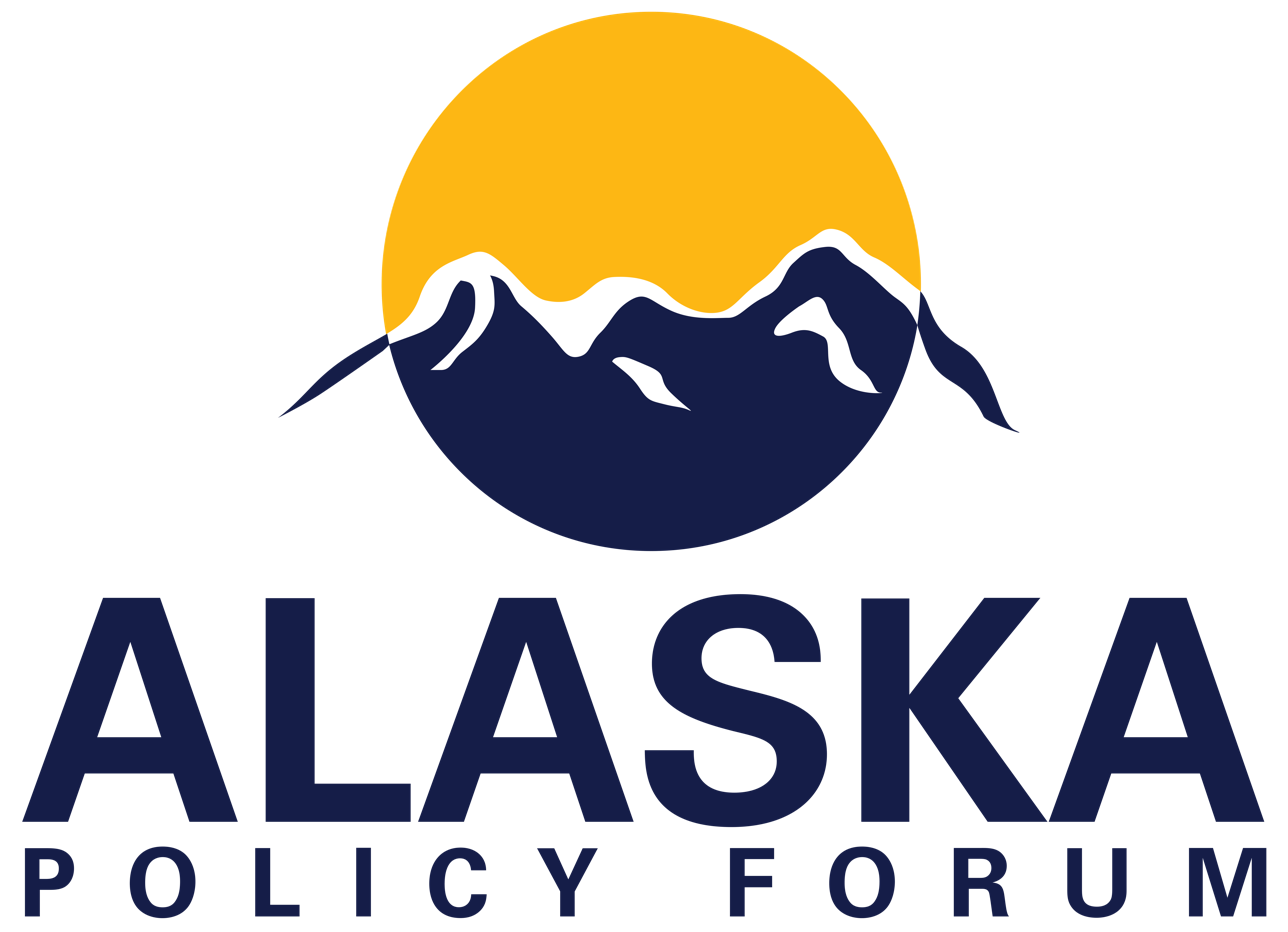
- Established: 2009; 17 years ago
- Mission: "Our mission is to empower and educate Alaskans and policymakers by promoting policies that grow freedom for all."
- Budget: $572,000 (2023)
- Slogan: "Our vision is an Alaska that continuously grows prosperity by maximizing individual opportunities and freedom."
- Location: Anchorage, Alaska
- Website: alaskapolicyforum.org

The Alaska Policy Forum (APF) is a conservative nonprofit think tank located in Anchorage, Alaska. The Alaska Policy Forum is a member of the State Policy Network.

== History ==
APF was started in 2009 and received Internal Revenue Service 501(c)(3) nonprofit status. In 2014, the group was entirely volunteer-run with no paid employees. Members of the AFP's board have included Nick Begich III, the grandson of former Representative Nick Begich Sr. and a candidate for Alaska's at-large congressional district in 2022.

== Policy areas ==
APF conducts and publishes research on education, taxes, health care, welfare, regulations, and state budget in Alaska. The group is active in education policy and is a proponent for increased school choice. The organization compiles and publishes the Performance Evaluation for Alaska's Schools (PEAKS) Assessment results.

APF is most well known for publishing public sector payroll data.

== Funding ==
According to the organization's website, Alaska Policy Forum does not accept government funding or grants, but instead relies on donations from individuals and businesses. The Alaska Policy Forum was started with support from Donors Capital Fund and Donors Trust, two related donor-advised funds. The Alaska Policy Forum received $192,000 from Donors Trust in 2009 and 2010.
