= Ville-Joonas Peltola =

Finnish ice hockey player

- Born: February 16, 1985 (age 41) Kangasala, Finland
- Height: 6 ft 3 in (191 cm)
- Weight: 209 lb (95 kg; 14 st 13 lb)
- Position: Defence
- Shot: Left
- Played for: Ilves
- Playing career: 2006–2014

Ville-Joonas Peltola (born February 16, 1985) is a Finnish former professional ice hockey player. He played with one game with Ilves of the SM-liiga during the 2010–11 season.
