= Nancy Dahlstrom =

American politician (born 1957)

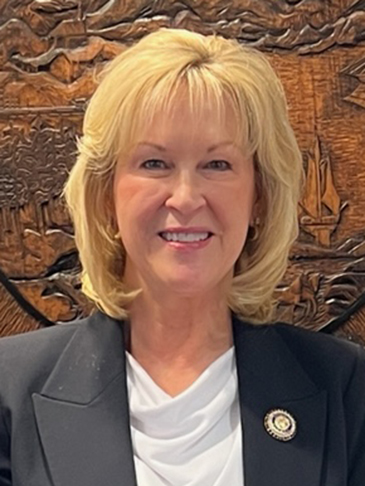
- Dahlstrom in 2024

15th Lieutenant Governor of Alaska
- Incumbent
- Assumed office December 5, 2022
- Governor: Mike Dunleavy
- Preceded by: Kevin Meyer

Commissioner of the Alaska Department of Corrections
- In office December 5, 2018 – May 31, 2022
- Governor: Mike Dunleavy
- Preceded by: Dean Williams
- Succeeded by: Jen Winkelman

Member of the Alaska House of Representatives from the 18th district
- In office January 21, 2003 – May 31, 2010
- Preceded by: Lisa Murkowski (redistricted)
- Succeeded by: Dan Saddler

Personal details
- Born: August 13, 1957 (age 69) Baltimore, Maryland, U.S.
- Party: Republican
- Spouse: Kit Dahlstrom
- Children: 4
- Education: Wayland Baptist University (BS); University of La Verne (MA)
- Website: Office website Campaign website

Nancy Dahlstrom (born August 13, 1957) is an American politician who has served as the 15th lieutenant governor of Alaska since December 2022. She previously served as a Republican member of the Alaska House of Representatives, representing the 18th and 13th districts. She was appointed to the House at the beginning of the legislative session in 2003 when the representative-elect, Lisa Murkowski, was appointed to the United States Senate.

Dahlstrom resigned from the House to take a position in the administration of Governor Sean Parnell, then resigned from that position after less than a month when constitutional issues arose.

She was again elected to the House 2018. However, she declined to be seated, instead accepting a position in the administration of Governor Mike Dunleavy. Dunleavy appointed Sharon Jackson to fill the full-term vacancy.

She ran for the 2024 United States House of Representatives election in Alaska, seeking to unseat incumbent Democrat Mary Peltola. After placing third in the August primary election, Dahlstrom dropped out of the race.

In May 2025, Dahlstrom decided to run for Governor of Alaska for the 2026 elections, before ultimately dropping out in June 2026.

== Education ==
Dahlstrom graduated from Sky View High School in Smithfield, Utah, in 1975. She received her Associate of Science in 1992 and her Bachelor of Science in 1994 for human services and business from Wayland Baptist University, and received her master's degree in organization management and human resources from the University of LaVerne in 1997.

== Legislative career ==
After losing the 2002 Republican primary against incumbent State Rep. Lisa Murkowski by 56 votes, Dahlstrom was appointed to the seat by Gov. Frank Murkowski (Lisa's father) when Lisa was appointed to succeed Frank in the U.S. Senate. She served as co-chair of the Armed Services Committee, vice-chair of the Judiciary Committee and the Legislative Budget & Audit Committee, and was a member of the Economic Development, Trade & Tourism Special Committee and the Energy Special Committee. She also served on the Environmental Conservation, Health & Social Services, Military & Veterans' Affairs and the Public Safety Finance Subcommittees, for the 26th Legislature. She spoke publicly while campaigning about reducing crime, both in her district and in the entire state of Alaska. She was elected back to the state house in 2018 but declined to be seated after accepting the position of Commissioner for the Department of Corrections.

== 2024 U.S. House election ==
Dahlstrom ran in the 2024 United States House of Representatives election in Alaska for Alaska's at-large congressional district against incumbent Democrat Mary Peltola and Republican Nick Begich III, endorsed by U.S. House Speaker Mike Johnson and former President Donald Trump. After placing third in the August primary election, Dahlstrom dropped out of the race.

== 2026 Alaska gubernatorial election ==
On May 5, 2025, Dahlstrom filed a letter of intent to run for governor with campaign regulators. This is the first step to participate in the 2026 Alaska gubernatorial campaign. On June 1, 2026, she withdrew from the race, citing a crowded field of candidates as her reason.

== Personal life ==
Dahlstrom and her husband, Kit, have four children and eleven grandchildren.

Party political offices
Preceded by Kevin Meyer	Republican nominee for Lieutenant Governor of Alaska; 2022	Most recent
Political offices
Preceded by Kevin Meyer	Lieutenant Governor of Alaska; 2022–present	Incumbent
