= Alaska Federation of Natives =

U.S. nonprofit organization

- Founded: October 1966
- Tax ID no.: 92-0034863
- Legal status: 501(c)(4) social welfare organization
- Headquarters: Anchorage, Alaska, U.S.
- Coordinates: 61.2064351°N 149.8867904°W
- President: Benjamin Mallott
- Affiliations: AFN Education Fund
- Revenue: $2,892,013 (2014)
- Expenses: $2,535,557 (2014)
- Employees: 11 (2014)
- Website: www.nativefederation.org

The Alaska Federation of Natives (AFN) is a Native organization in the state of Alaska, United States. Through legal and legislative processes, its mission is to enhance and promote the cultural, economic and political voice of the entire Alaska Native community.

As of October 1, 2024, Benjamin Mallott is the president of AFN, having replaced Julie Kitka after a 34-year tenure.

== Structure ==
The largest statewide Native organization, AFN's membership includes over 170 villages (both federally recognized tribes and village corporations), 13 regional native corporations, and 12 regional nonprofit and tribal consortiums that contract and run federal and state programs. Altogether, it represents over 140,000 Native people in Alaska. AFN is governed by a 37-member board, which is elected by its membership at the annual convention held each October.

== History ==
The Alaska Federation of Natives was formed in October 1966 after Emil Notti organized a convening of 400 Alaska Natives, representing 17 Native organizations, via a three-day conference that sought to address Alaska Native aboriginal land rights. The AFN was officially incorporated on January 8, 1970.

From 1966 to 1971, AFN worked primarily to achieve passage of a just and fair land settlement. Specifically, the 1968 discovery of oil at Prudhoe Bay prompted Native leaders to push for a land claims settlement with unprecedented urgency. On December 18, 1971, the Alaska Native Claims Settlement Act (ANCSA) was signed into law.

Later, in the early and mid-1970s, AFN provided technical assistance to help Alaska Natives implement ANCSA and set up the corporations mandated by the Act. In the eighties, the AFN helped with the development and passage of federal laws including the Alaska National Interest Lands Conservation Act of 1980 and the 1987 Amendments to ANCSA (the "1991 legislation"). It also turned its attention to social, tribal and economic issues, as well as participating in the legislative process by promoting laws, policies and programs in areas such as health, education, resource development, labor and government.

== Annual convention ==
AFN's annual convention is the largest representative annual gathering in the United States for Native people. Upwards of 6,000 people attend each year, including 1,000 voting delegates from across the state; delegates are elected on a population formula of one representative per 25 Native residents in the area, and delegate participation rates at the annual convention typically exceed 95%.

During the convention, the entire state of Alaska is blanketed with discussion on current events and issues; each year, the convention adopts a theme to focus on. International observers are present at most meetings, both exchanging information and learning from the Alaska Native experience. Proceedings are broadcast live via television, radio, and webcast.

=== Quyana Alaska ===
Their traditional dances remain significant to the heart of their culture and their communities as it sustains and connects them with their cultural history. Passed from generation to generation, their dances ensure that the many distinct Native cultures across Alaska remain connected to their origins.

For more than two decades, Alaska Native communities have gathered through dance to celebrate Quyana Alaska during the Alaska Federation of Natives' (AFN) Annual Convention. First introduced at the 1982 Convention, Quyana Alaska was established to support the revitalization of traditional dances and encourage their preservation and transmission to future generations. Since its introduction, more than 200 dance groups have performed at Native gatherings throughout the state. The initiative has contributed to the broader cultural revitalization movement across rural Alaska, and Quyana Alaska has become a longstanding feature of the AFN Annual Convention.

=== Fairs ===
In the annual convention's Alaska Native Customary Art Fair, artists from Alaska and other states showcase, exhibit, and sell their work. Likewise, the AFN Exhibit Fair hosts over a hundred exhibitors ranging "organizations to political campaigns and state agencies."

=== Denali Awards ===
The Denali Awards—the AFN's highest honor for people of non-Native ancestry—is named after the state's (and continent's) highest mountain. Recipients have included Tony Knowles and Ann Fienup-Riordan.

=== Banquet ===
At the end of each annual convention, a banquet takes place for "celebrating Indigenous cultures and reflecting on the week's work." It typically includes guest entertainers and storytellers.

== Incidents ==
=== Membership ===
In May 2023, the Central Council of the Tlingit and Haida Indian Tribes of Alaska declared that they would withdraw from AFN, after council vote, stating that membership "doesn't feel as necessary," especially in light of "about $65,000 membership dues" paid annually. President Richard Chalyee Éesh Peterson stated that "I don't want it to look like a divorce... We're the kids who grew up and are moving out of the house."

Around the same time, the Tanana Chiefs Conference stated that the time and funds needed for membership should instead be "utilized to their maximum potential to advance TCC's Tribal priorities."

Later, in 2025, the Tlingit and Haida tribes rejoined the AFN, citing a need for "greater unity among Alaska Native peoples" in light of the American political climate. The Tanana Chiefs Conference also rejoined for similar reasons.

=== U.S. House candidate forum ===
In 2024, the AFN's annual convention decided to forego its usual U.S. House forum, a series of events during which "prospective Alaska politicians seeking statewide office" could discuss their platforms. Then-candidate Nick Begich III called the decision a "disservice," while incumbent Mary Peltola's campaign lauded AFN's choice to not platform Begich, "a candidate who has routinely put down Mary for partaking in Alaska Native traditions important to her community and for celebrating the life of a loved one after her husband passed away."
