= Nick Begich III =

American politician and businessman (born 1977)

Nick Begich
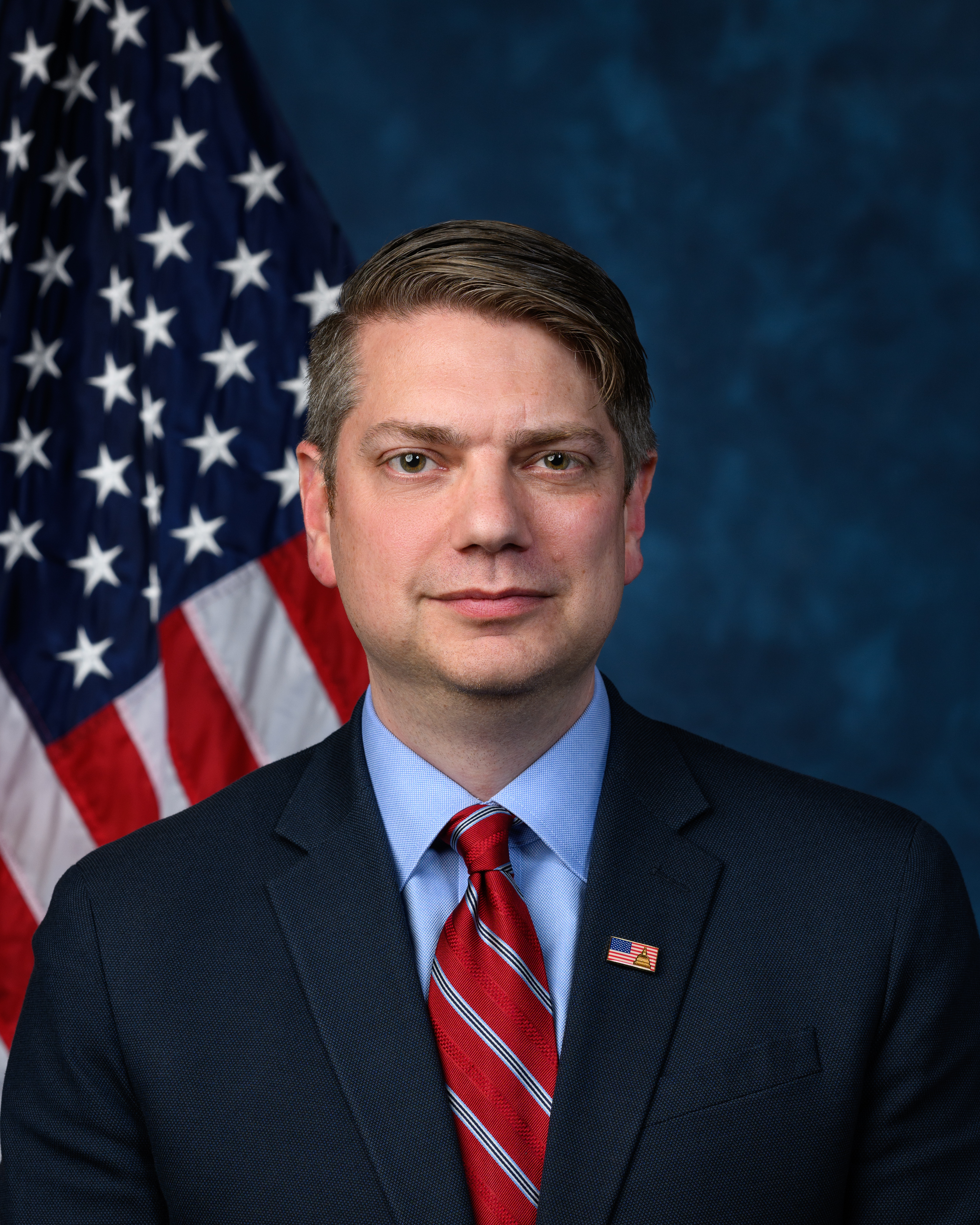
- Official portrait, 2025

Member of the U.S. House of Representatives from Alaska's at-large district
- Incumbent
- Assumed office January 3, 2025
- Preceded by: Mary Peltola

Personal details
- Born: Nicholas Joseph Begich III; October 21, 1977 (age 49) Anchorage, Alaska, U.S.
- Party: Republican
- Spouse: Dharna Vakharia (m. 2002)
- Children: 1
- Relatives: Nick Begich Sr. (grandfather); Tom Begich (uncle); Mark Begich (uncle)
- Education: Baylor University (BBA); Indiana University, Bloomington (MBA)
- Website: House website Campaign website

Nicholas Joseph Begich III (/ˈbɛɡɪtʃ/ BEG-itch; born October 21, 1977) is an American politician and businessman who has served as the U.S. representative for Alaska's at-large congressional district since 2025. A member of the Republican Party, he had previously run for the seat in the 2022 special and regular elections before his election in 2024.

== Early life and family ==
Begich was born on October 21, 1977, in Anchorage, Alaska, to Nicholas Joseph Begich Jr., an author and business owner, and Starr Lyn Weed (née Baker). He is a member of the political Begich family who have been affiliated with the Democratic Party, although he is a Republican. He is the paternal grandson of Nick Begich Sr., who served as a U.S. representative for Alaska from 1971 until his disappearance and presumed death in a plane crash in 1972. Begich Sr. had six children, including Nick Begich Jr., Mark Begich, and Tom Begich. Mark Begich served as a U.S. Senator from Alaska; Tom Begich served as the Minority Leader of the Alaska Senate.

Begich attended and graduated from The Master's Academy, a Florida high school, having moved to Florida with his maternal grandparents after his parents divorced. He received a Bachelor of Business Administration from Baylor University, Texas. Afterwards, he received a Master of Business Administration from Indiana University Bloomington.

== Business career ==
After graduating, he founded FarShore Partners, a software development company which is mostly based in India. In 2016, it had 160 employees internationally. Begich has been business partners with Rick Desai since 2009. He was later joined by his other business partner, J.C. Garrett, in managing both FarShore Partners and Dashfire. As of 2021, he served as the company's executive chairman.

== Early political career ==
In 2016, he ran for Seat A in District 2 (Chugiak/Eagle River) of the Anchorage City Council against Republican incumbent Amy Demboski. Begich lost, receiving 42 percent of the vote to Demboski's 58 percent.

He has served as a board member of Alaska Policy Forum, a conservative think tank. He was the co-chair of the Alaska Republican Party's Finance Committee. He served as a co-chair on Don Young's 2020 re-election campaign for the U.S. House.

== U.S. House of Representatives ==
=== Elections ===
==== 2022 special election ====
In October 2021, he announced his campaign to run for the Alaska's at-large U.S. House seat against incumbent Republican Don Young, who held the seat since 1972. Young died in March 2022 which led to a special election scheduled for August 16, 2022. The election was a 3-way race of Begich, former Republican Alaska Governor Sarah Palin and Democratic former state Representative Mary Peltola.

The election was the first to use Alaska's new ranked-choice voting (RCV) method, approved by voters in 2020. The winners of the top-four blanket primary advanced to the ranked-choice runoff election, but only three candidates competed (as Al Gross withdrew and endorsed Peltola). Peltola was declared the winner on August 31 after all ballots were counted. Peltola's victory was widely seen as an upset in a traditionally Republican state.

==== 2022 regular election ====
The regular 2022 Alaska's at-large U.S. House election was held on November 8. The four candidates were incumbent Peltola, Palin, Begich, and Libertarian Chris Bye. Under the rules of instant-runoff, Bye and Begich were eliminated in the first and second rounds, after they received the fewest votes. These votes were then transferred to either Peltola or Palin, depending on who the voter ranked higher on their ballot. Peltola won with 55 percent of the vote, increasing her margin from the special election.

Social choice theorists commenting on the race noted that unlike the previous special election, the general election involved few election pathologies. Peltola won the election as the majority-preferred (Condorcet) candidate, with ballots indicating support from a majority of voters.

==== 2024 regular election ====
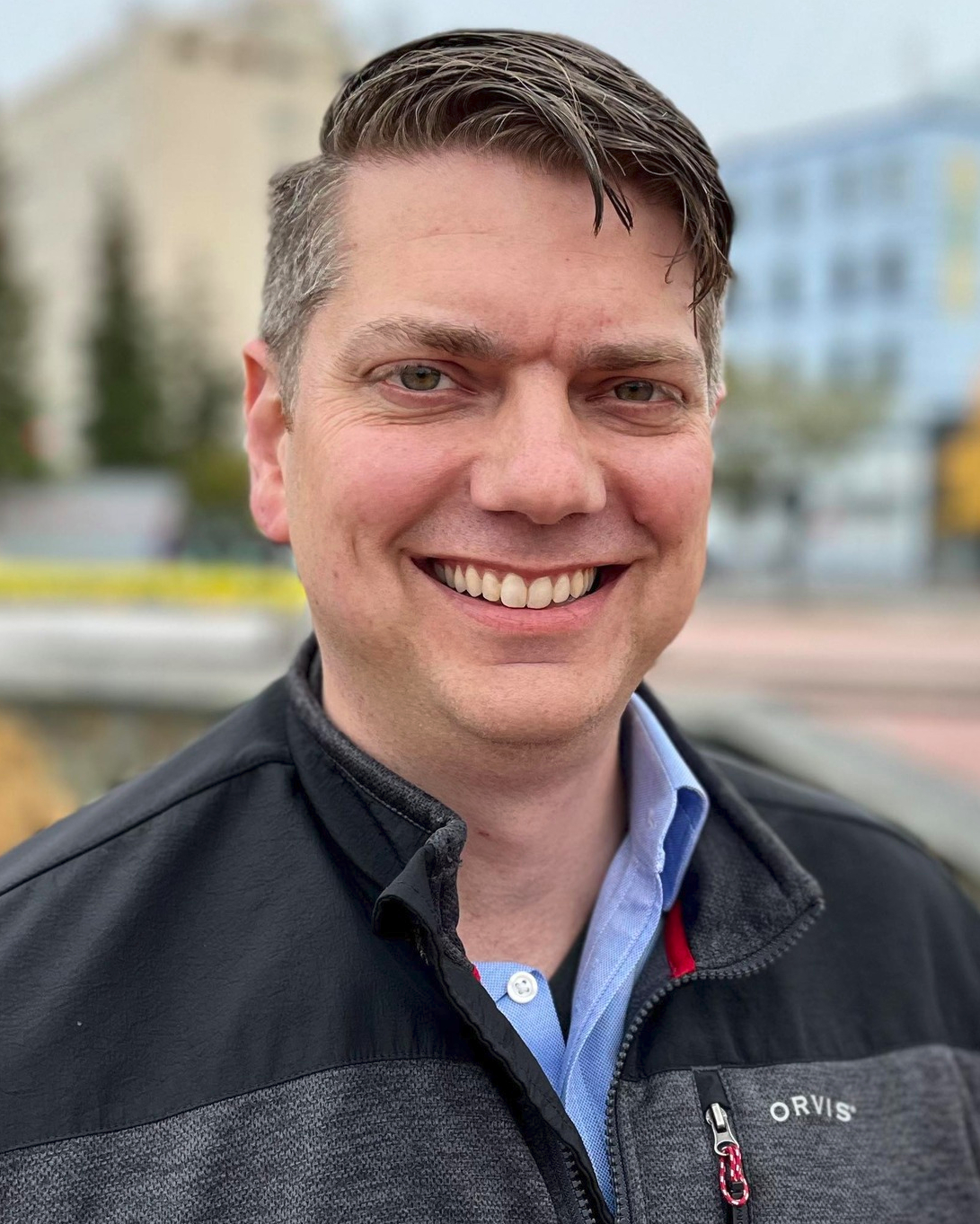
Begich in Fairbanks, Alaska during his 2024 congressional run

The regular 2024 Alaska's at-large U.S. House election was held on November 5. The election coincided with the 2024 U.S. presidential election, as well as other elections to the U.S. House, elections to the United States Senate, and various other state and local elections.

The primary election was held on August 20, 2024, with candidates Mary Peltola, Nick Begich, and Republican Nancy Dahlstrom emerging as the main candidates. After placing third, Dahlstrom withdrew from the race to avoid another result like 2022 to ensure there was no center squeeze or spoiler effect, resulting in a traditional two-party race with two clear frontrunners. The four candidates were Begich, Peltola, Alaskan Independence Party candidate John Wayne Howe, and Democrat Eric Hafner.

On November 20, it was announced that Begich defeated Peltola. In the first round, he achieved 48.42% of the vote against her 46.36%. After other candidates were eliminated, the final round resulted in Begich receiving 51.3% of the vote against Peltola's 48.7%, making him the winner.

=== Tenure ===
Begich was sworn into the U.S. House on January 3, 2025. Later that month, the U.S. House passed two of Begich's bills. The bills, which restored land rights to Alaska Native village corporations and made it easier for disabled Alaska Natives to qualify for federal aid programs, passed nearly unanimously with bipartisan support. Begich became the first freshman member of the 119th United States Congress to have a bill passed.

Under the One Big Beautiful Bill Act (OBBBA), signed into law in July 2025, Begich achieved mandated oil and gas lease sales in the Coastal Plain area of the Arctic National Wildlife Refuge, the National Petroleum Reserve-Alaska, and Cook-Inlet, while also increasing Alaska's share of federal oil leasing revenues from the OBBBA mandated leases in Alaska from 50% to 70% starting in 2035.

Begich was not a supporter of Thomas Massie's September 2025 discharge petition to force a vote on the Epstein Files Transparency Act, which was opposed by President Trump. Following the passage of the discharge petition on November 12, and Trump's reversal to supporting the bill on November 16, Begich joined the Republican caucus in the 427-1 vote passage of the bill on November 18.

On January 8, 2026, Begich was one of 196 Republicans in the U.S. House to vote against a three-year extension of Affordable Care Act subsidies that had been in effect since 2021 and expired at the end of 2025.

Begich is a co-sponsor of the SAVE America Act, requiring voters to show proof of citizenship to register to vote, as well as photo ID to cast a ballot. The bill passed in the U.S. House on February 11, 2026.

Begich has supported Trump in the 2026 Iran war. In March and June 2026, he voted against war powers resolutions that would have limited Trump's ability to wage war in Iran, until congressional consent had been obtained.

In May 2026, Begich introduced the American Reserve Modernization Act of 2026. The bill would consolidate custody and management of cryptocurrency held by the federal government, and create a strategic Bitcoin reserve within the U.S. Treasury Department.

=== Committee assignments ===
- Committee on Natural Resources
  - Subcommittee on Energy and Mineral Resources (Vice Chair)
  - Subcommittee on Oversight and Investigations
- Committee on Transportation and Infrastructure
  - Subcommittee on Aviation
  - Subcommittee on Coast Guard and Maritime Transportation
  - Subcommittee on Railroads, Pipelines, and Hazardous Materials (Vice Chair)
- Committee on Science, Space, and Technology
  - Subcommittee on Energy
  - Subcommittee on Environment
  - Subcommittee on Investigations and Oversight

=== Caucus memberships ===
- DOGE Caucus
- AI Caucus
- Ferry Caucus
- Freedom Caucus
- Greenland Caucus
- Golden Dome Caucus
- Native American Caucus - Republican Vice Chair
- Pacific Islands Caucus
- Republican Study Committee
- Congressional Western Caucus - Executive Vice Chair
- Sharia Free America Caucus

== Personal life ==
He lives in Chugiak, Anchorage, Alaska. Begich and his wife, Dharna, have one son, Nicholas IV. He is a Protestant.

== Electoral history ==
2016 Municipality of Anchorage Assembly election, Seat A in District 2 (Chugiak/Eagle River)
Party	Candidate	Votes	%	±%
Republican	Amy Demboski (incumbent)	4,414	57.72%	
Republican	Nick Begich	3,188	41.69%	
Write-in		45	0.59%	
Total votes		7,647	100.0%	
Republican hold				

=== U.S. House elections ===
2022 Alaska's at-large congressional district special primary election results
Party	Candidate	Votes	%
Republican	Sarah Palin	43,601	27.01
Republican	Nick Begich	30,861	19.12
Independent	Al Gross (Note: Withdrew from the general election following his victory in the primary)	20,392	12.63
Democratic	Mary Peltola	16,265	10.08
Republican	Tara Sweeney	9,560	5.92
Independent	Santa Claus	7,625	4.72
Democratic	Christopher Constant	6,224	3.86
Independent	Jeff Lowenfels	5,994	3.71
Republican	John Coghill	3,842	2.38
Republican	Josh Revak	3,785	2.34
Independent	Andrew Halcro	3,013	1.87
Democratic	Adam Wool	2,730	1.69
Democratic	Emil Notti	1,777	1.10
Libertarian	Chris Bye	1,049	0.65
Democratic	Mike Milligan	608	0.38
Independence	John Howe	380	0.24
Independent	Laurel Foster	338	0.21
Republican	Stephen Wright	332	0.21
Republican	Jay Armstrong	286	0.18
Libertarian	J. R. Myers	285	0.18
Independent	Gregg Brelsford	284	0.18
Democratic	Ernest Thomas	199	0.12
Republican	Bob Lyons	197	0.12
Republican	Otto Florschutz	193	0.12
Republican	Maxwell Sumner	133	0.08
Republican	Clayton Trotter	121	0.07
Independent	Anne McCabe	118	0.07
Republican	John Callahan	114	0.07
Independent	Arlene Carle	107	0.07
Independent	Tim Beck	96	0.06
Independent	Sherry Mettler	92	0.06
Republican	Tom Gibbons	94	0.06
Independent	Lady Donna Dutchess	87	0.05
American Independent	Robert Ornelas	83	0.05
Independent	Ted Heintz	70	0.04
Independent	Silvio Pellegrini	70	0.04
Independent	Karyn Griffin	67	0.04
Independent	David Hughes	54	0.03
Independent	Don Knight	46	0.03
Republican	Jo Woodward	44	0.03
Independent	Jason Williams	37	0.02
Independent	Robert Brown	36	0.02
Independent	Dennis Aguayo	31	0.02
Independent	William Hibler III	25	0.02
Republican	Bradley Welter	24	0.01
Independent	David Thistle	23	0.01
Independent	Brian Beal	19	0.01
Republican	Mikel Melander	17	0.01
Total votes		161,428	100.0

2022 Alaska's at-large congressional district special election
Party	Candidate	Round 1			Round 2	
Party	Candidate	Votes	%	Transfer	Votes	%
Democratic	Mary Peltola	74,817	39.66%	+15,467	91,266	51.48%
Republican	Sarah Palin	58,339	30.92%	+27,053	86,026	48.52%
Republican	Nick Begich	52,536	27.85%	-52,536	Eliminated	
Write-in		2,974	1.58%	-2,974	Eliminated	
Total votes		188,666	100.00%		177,423	94.04%
Inactive ballots		0	0.00%	+11,243	11,243	5.96%
Democratic gain from Republican						

2022 Alaska U.S. House of Representatives primary election results
Party	Candidate	Votes	%
Democratic	Mary Peltola	70,295	36.80
Republican	Sarah Palin	57,693	30.20
Republican	Nick Begich	50,021	26.19
Republican	Tara Sweeney (withdrew)	7,195	3.77
Libertarian	Chris Bye (Note: Chris Bye placed fifth in the nonpartisan primary. However, the fourth-place finisher — Tara Sweeney — withdrew, placing Bye in the general election.)	1,189	0.62
Libertarian	J. R. Myers	531	0.28
Republican	Bob Lyons	447	0.23
Republican	Jay Armstrong	403	0.21
Republican	Brad Snowden	355	0.19
Republican	Randy Purham	311	0.16
Independent	Lady Donna Dutchess	270	0.14
Independent	Sherry Strizak	252	0.13
American Independent	Robert Ornelas	248	0.13
Republican	Denise Williams	242	0.13
Independent	Gregg Brelsford	241	0.13
Independent	David Hughes	238	0.12
Independent	Andrew Phelps	222	0.12
Independent	Tremayne Wilson	194	0.10
Independent	Sherry Mettler	191	0.10
Independent	Silvio Pellegrini	187	0.10
Independent	Ted Heintz	173	0.09
Independent	Davis LeBlanc	117	0.06
Total votes		191,015	100.00

2022 Alaska's at-large congressional district election
Party	Candidate	Round 1			Round 2			Round 3	
Party	Candidate	Votes	%	Transfer	Votes	%	Transfer	Votes	%
Democratic	Mary Peltola (incumbent)	128,329	48.68%	+1,038	129,433	49.20%	+7,460	136,893	54.94%
Republican	Sarah Palin	67,732	25.74%	+1,064	69,242	26.32%	+43,013	112,255	45.06%
Republican	Nick Begich	61,431	23.34%	+1,988	64,392	24.48%	-64,392	Eliminated	
Libertarian	Chris Bye	4,560	1.73%	-4,560	Eliminated				
Write-in		1,096	0.42%	-1,096	Eliminated				
Total votes		263,148	100.00%		263,067	100.00%		249,148	100.00%
Inactive ballots		2,193	0.83%	+906	3,097	1.16%	+14,765	17,016	5.55%
Democratic hold									

2024 Alaska U.S. House of Representatives primary election results
Party	Candidate	Votes	%
Democratic	Mary Peltola (incumbent)	55,166	50.9
Republican	Nick Begich III	28,803	26.6
Republican	Nancy Dahlstrom (withdrew)	21,574	19.9
Republican	Matthew Salisbury (withdrew)	652	0.6
Independence	John Wayne Howe	621	0.6
Democratic	Eric Hafner	467	0.4
Republican	Gerald Heikes	424	0.4
Independent	Lady Donna Dutchess	195	0.2
Independent	David Ambrose	154	0.1
No Labels	Richard Grayson	143	0.1
Independent	Richard Mayers	119	0.1
Independent	Samuel Claesson	89	0.1
Total votes		108,407	100.00

2024 Alaska's at-large congressional district election
Party	Candidate	First choice		Round 1			Round 2			Round 3	
Party	Candidate	Votes	%	Votes	%	Transfer	Votes	%	Transfer	Votes	%
Republican	Nick Begich III	159,550	48.41%	159,777	48.49%	+267	160,044	48.77%	+4,817	164,861	51.22%
Democratic	Mary Peltola (incumbent)	152,828	46.37%	152,948	46.42%	+1,313	154,261	47.01%	+2,724	156,985	48.78%
Independence	John Wayne Howe	13,010	3.95%	13,210	4.01%	+661	13,871	4.23%	-13,871	Eliminated	
Democratic	Eric Hafner	3,417	1.04%	3,558	1.08%	-3,558	Eliminated				
Write-in		750	0.23%	Eliminated							
Total votes		329,555		329,493			328,176			321,846	
Inactive ballots (Note: Includes overvotes, undervotes, and exhausted ballots where another candidate was not ranked.)				6,360		+1,317	7,677		+6,330	14,007	
Republican gain from Democratic											

== Notes ==
U.S. House of Representatives
Preceded by Mary Peltola	Member of the U.S. House of Representatives from Alaska's at-large congressional district 2025–present	Incumbent
U.S. order of precedence (ceremonial)
Preceded by Michael Baumgartner	United States representatives by seniority 367th	Succeeded by Wesley Bell
