= 25th Alaska State Legislature =

Term of state legislature in Alaska, US

The 25th Alaska State Legislature served for a term lasting from January 16, 2007, to January 19, 2009. All forty representatives and one-half of the senate (ten members) were elected to their terms on November 7, 2006. The remaining ten senators were elected to their terms on November 2, 2004.

== Sessions ==
- First session: January 16, 2007 – May 16, 2007
- Second session: January 15, 2008 – April 13, 2008
- Special session: June 3, 2008 – August 7, 2008

In the 2006 elections, a voter initiative championed by freshman Fairbanks representative Jay Ramras was passed by voters, which reduced the statutory length of the session from the existing length of 120 days to 90 days. The changes to the law made by the initiative took effect with the second session of this legislature. Current legislation would make changes to accommodate a 90 session.

Although the second session adjourned on time, some members of the legislature claimed that legislation was rushed and public input was jeopardized.

== Senate ==
=== Composition ===
Alaska Senate
Affiliation	Members
Republican Party	11
Democratic Party	9
Total	20
Majority	2

==== Bipartisan coalition ====
Shortly after the 2006 November election, a bipartisan coalition was announced between all nine Democratic senators and six of the eleven Republican senators. Democrats will chair the Judiciary, Health, Education, & Social Services, Labor and Commerce, Community and Regional Affairs, and Transportation Committees, as well as co-chair the powerful Finance Committee. The Senate Republicans in the coalition will also had a co-chair for the Finance Committee (the minority Republicans were given one seat on the committee), and chair the State Affairs, Resources, and Rules Committees.

Because of the Republican split, the Democrats controlled a majority of committee chairmanships while Republicans in the governing coalition chair the others. The majority leader was the same legislator as it was in the last session, a Republican, who joined the bi-partisan coalition. Because of this, the minority leader was head of the five-member Republican organization. Hence, all three listed officers of the body were Republicans, as different aspects were in the majority (with the chamber-wide minority Democrats) while others are in the official minority.

The split was largely viewed as being over the Senate presidency. The minority leader was the Republicans' suspected, initial choice for Senate President. The coalition commanded three-quarters of the body.

A similar move was made in the 24th Legislature, on the House side. The coalition was later disbanded.

=== Leadership ===
The President of the Senate is Republican Lyda Green of District G (Matanuska-Susitna Valley). The Majority Leader is Republican Gary Stevens of District R (Kodiak). The Minority Leader is Republican Gene Therriault of District F (North Pole).

Position	Name	Party	Residence	District
President of the Senate	Lyda Green	Republican	Matanuska-Susitna Valley	District G
Majority Leader	Johnny Ellis	Democrat	Anchorage	District L
Minority Leader	Gene Therriault	Republican	North Pole	District F

=== Membership ===
Alaska State Senate 25th Alaska Legislature, 2007-2008
District	Name	Party	Location	Term Up
A	Bert Stedman	Rep-Coalition	Sitka	2008
B	Kim Elton	Dem-Coalition	Juneau	2010
C	Albert Kookesh	Dem-Coalition	Angoon	2008
D	Joe Thomas	Dem-Coalition	Fairbanks	2010
E	Gary Wilken	Republican	Fairbanks	2008
F	Gene Therriault	Republican	North Pole	2010
G	Lyda Green	Rep-Coalition	Matanuska-Susitna Valley	2008
H	Charlie Huggins	Rep-Coalition	Wasilla	2010
I	Fred Dyson	Republican	Eagle River	2008
J	Bill Wielechowski	Dem-Coalition	Anchorage	2010
K	Bettye Davis	Dem-Coalition	Anchorage	2008
L	Johnny Ellis	Dem-Coalition	Anchorage	2010
M	Hollis French	Dem-Coalition	Anchorage	2008
N	Lesil McGuire	Rep-Coalition	Anchorage	2010
O	Kevin Meyer	Rep-Coalition	Anchorage	2008
P	Con Bunde	Republican	Anchorage	2010
Q	Thomas Wagoner	Republican	Kenai	2008
R	Gary Stevens	Rep-Coalition	Kodiak	2010
S	Lyman F. Hoffman	Dem-Coalition	Bethel	2010
T	Donald Olson	Dem-Coalition	Nome	2008

== Alaska House of Representatives ==
=== Composition ===
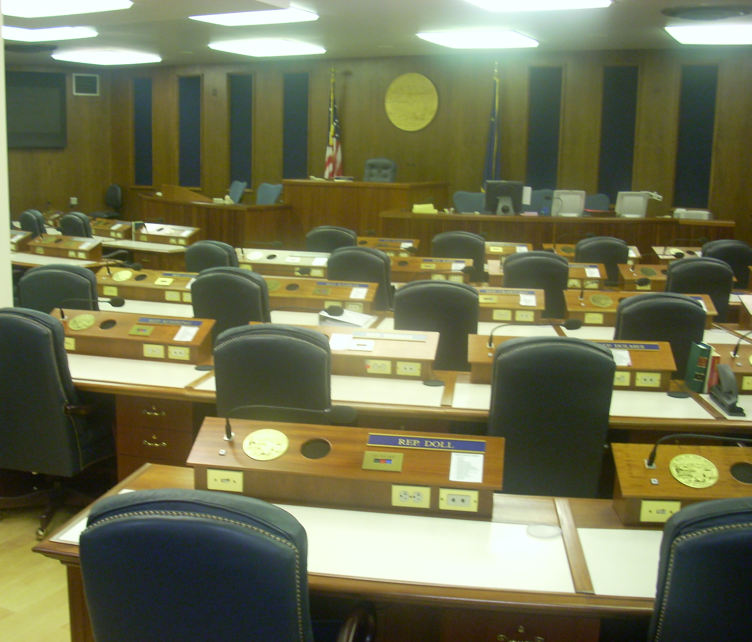
The House chambers as they appeared during the 25th Legislature.

Alaska State House of Representatives
Affiliation	Members
Republican Party	23
Democratic Party	17
Total	40
Majority	6

=== Leadership ===
Position	Name	Party	Residence	District
Speaker	John Harris	Republican	Valdez	District 12
Majority Leader	Ralph Samuels	Republican	Anchorage	District 29
Minority Leader	Beth Kerttula	Democratic	Juneau	District 3

=== Members ===
Alaska State House of Representatives 25th Alaska Legislature, 2007-2008
District	Name	Party	Location
1	Kyle Johansen	Republican	Ketchikan
2	Peggy Wilson	Republican	Wrangell
3	Beth Kerttula	Democratic	Juneau
4	Andrea Doll	Democratic	Juneau
5	Bill Thomas	Republican	Haines
6	Woodie Salmon	Democratic	Beaver
7	Mike Kelly	Republican	Fairbanks
8	David Guttenberg	Democratic	Fairbanks
9	Scott Kawasaki	Democratic	Fairbanks
10	Jay Ramras	Republican	Fairbanks
11	John B. Coghill, Jr.	Republican	North Pole
12	John L. Harris	Republican	Valdez
13	Carl J. Gatto	Republican	Palmer
14	Vic Kohring	Republican	Wasilla
15	Mark A. Neuman	Republican	Wasilla
16	Bill Stoltze	Republican	Chugiak/Mat-Su
17	Anna I. Fairclough	Republican	Eagle River
18	Nancy A. Dahlstrom	Republican	Anchorage
19	Bob Roses	Republican	Anchorage
20	Max Gruenberg	Democratic	Anchorage
21	Harry Crawford	Democratic	Anchorage
22	Sharon Cissna	Democratic	Anchorage
23	Les Gara	Democratic	Anchorage
24	Berta Gardner	Democratic	Anchorage
25	Mike Doogan	Democratic	Anchorage
26	Lindsey Holmes	Democratic	Anchorage
27	Robert "Bob" Buch	Democratic	Anchorage
28	Craig W. Johnson	Republican	Anchorage
29	Ralph Samuels	Republican	Anchorage
30	Kevin Meyer	Republican	Anchorage
31	Bob Lynn	Republican	Anchorage
32	Mike Hawker	Republican	Anchorage
33	Kurt Olson	Republican	Kenai
34	Charles "Mike" Chenault	Republican	Nikiski
35	Paul Seaton	Republican	Homer
36	Gabrielle LeDoux	Republican	Kodiak
37	Bryce Edgmon	Democratic	Unalaska
38	Mary Sattler Kapsner Nelson	Democratic	Bethel
39	Richard Foster	Democratic	Nome
40	Reggie Joule	Democratic	Kotzebue

== See also ==
- List of Alaska State Legislatures
- 24th Alaska State Legislature, the legislature preceding this one
- 26th Alaska State Legislature, the legislature following this one
- List of governors of Alaska
- List of speakers of the Alaska House of Representatives
- Alaska Legislature
- Alaska Senate
- {AKLeg.gov}
