= 2006 Alaska elections =

On November 7, 2006, the state of Alaska held its general elections. On the ballot were races for U.S Representative, Governor and Lieutenant Governor, 10 of 20 seats in the Alaska Senate, all 40 seats in the Alaska House of Representatives, 2 ballot measures, plus retention elections for 18 judges of the Alaska Superior Court and 13 judges of the Alaska District Court.

In the tables below, bold indicates the winners, while italics indicates the incumbents.

== Federal races ==
=== U.S. Representative election ===
Party	Candidate	Hometown	Votes	%
	Diane E. Benson	Chugiak	93,879	40.01
	Alexander Crawford	Anchorage	4,029	1.72
	Eva L. Ince	Anchorage	1,819	0.78
	William W. "Bill" Ratigan	Juneau	1,615	0.69
	**Don Young**	**Fort Yukon**	**132,743**	**56.57**
	Write-in votes		560	0.24

== State races ==
=== Alaska gubernatorial election ===
Party	Candidates	Hometowns	Votes	%
	Andrew Halcro and Fay Von Gemmingen	Anchorage/Palmer	22,443	9.46
	Tony Knowles and Ethan Berkowitz	Anchorage/Anchorage	97,238	40.97
	David M. Massie (no running mate)	Anchorage	593	0.25
	**Sarah Palin and Sean Parnell**	**Wasilla/Anchorage**	**114,697**	**48.33**
	William S. "Billy" Toien and Robert D. Mirabal	Anchorage/Anchorage	682	0.29
	Don Wright and Douglas L. Welton	Fairbanks/Fairbanks	1,285	0.54
	Write-in votes		384	0.16

=== State Senate elections ===
==== Analysis ====
**24th Legislature** **(incumbents)**	**Members**
Republican	12
Democrat	8

**In the 2006 elections**	**Members**
Republican held and uncontested	7
Contested	9
Democratic held and uncontested	4
**Total**	**20**

==== State Senate results ====
**Party**	**Candidate**	**Hometown**	**Votes**	%
District B
	**Kim Elton**	**Juneau**	**8,679**	**64.51**
	Herman M. "Mac" Meiners Jr.	Juneau	4,742	35.25
	Write-in votes		32	0.24
District D
	David P. Braun	Healy	415	2.70
	Ralph C. Seekins	Fairbanks	5,952	38.67
	**Joe Thomas**	**Fairbanks**	**8,992**	**58.42**
	Write-in votes		34	0.22
District F
	Tim Beck	North Pole	2,953	27.19
	**Gene Therriault**	**North Pole**	**6,881**	**72.57**
	Write-in votes		26	0.24
District H
	Jay Cross	Big Lake	4,351	30.74
	**Charlie Huggins**	**Wasilla**	**9,743**	**68.83**
	Write-in votes		61	0.43
District J
	Earl Mayo	Anchorage	3,082	38.70
	**Bill Wielechowski**	**Anchorage**	**4,848**	**60.88**
	Write-in votes		33	0.41

**Party**	**Candidate**	**Hometown**	**Votes**	%
District L
	**Johnny Ellis**	**Anchorage**	**7,105**	**95.01**
	Write-in votes		373	4.99
District N
	**Lesil McGuire**	**Anchorage**	**8,348**	**65.92**
	Ray Utter	Anchorage	4,269	33.71
	Write-in votes		46	0.36
District P
	**Con Bunde**	**Anchorage**	**8,607**	**53.10**
	Macon Roberts	Anchorage	7,567	46.68
	Write-in votes		36	0.22
District R
	Charles E. Davidson	Kodiak	4,300	39.66
	**Gary Stevens**	**Kodiak**	**6,510**	**60.04**
	Write-in votes		32	0.30
District S
	Norman Ayagalria	Bethel	2,234	30.30
	**Lyman Hoffman**	**Bethel**	**5,010**	**67.96**
	Write-in votes		128	1.74

=== State House elections ===
==== Analysis ====
**24th Legislature** **(incumbents)**	**Members**
Republican	27
Democrat	13

**In the 2006 elections**	**Members**
Uncontested Republican	6
Contested	28
Uncontested Democratic	6
**Total**	**40**

==== State House results ====
**Party**	**Candidate**	**Hometown**	**Votes**	%
District 1
	**Kyle Johansen**	**Ketchikan**	**3,752**	**94.32**
	Write-in votes		226	5.68
District 2
	Jay Stelzenmuller	Sitka	2,356	43.21
	**Peggy Wilson**	**Wrangell**	**3,072**	**56.35**
	Write-in votes		24	0.44
District 3
	**Beth Kerttula**	**Juneau**	**5,708**	**95.64**
	Write-in votes		260	4.36
District 4
	**Andrea Doll**	**Juneau**	**3,288**	**50.28**
	Randy Wanamaker	Juneau	3,217	49.19
	Write-in votes		35	0.54
District 5
	Aaron T. Isaacs Jr.	Klawock	2,245	42.76
	**Bill Thomas**	**Haines**	**2,988**	**56.91**
	Write-in votes		17	0.32
District 6
	Carl Morgan Jr.	Aniak	2,412	48.21
	**Woodie Salmon**	**Beaver**	**2,580**	**51.57**
	Write-in votes		11	0.22
District 7
	Mark A. Ames	Fairbanks	288	3.68
	**Mike Kelly**	**Fairbanks**	**4,413**	**56.35**
	Dave Watts	Fairbanks	3,107	39.68
	Write-in votes		23	0.29
District 8
	Jason Crawford	Fairbanks	2,648	35.75
	**David Guttenberg**	**Fairbanks**	**4,740**	**64.00**
	Write-in votes		18	0.24
District 9
	James A. "Jim" Holm	Fairbanks	2,118	44.65
	**Scott Kawasaki**	**Fairbanks**	**2,617**	**55.16**
	Write-in votes		9	0.19
District 10
	**Jay Ramras**	**Fairbanks**	**2,366**	**92.13**
	Write-in votes		202	7.87
District 11
	**John Coghill**	**North Pole**	**4,369**	**69.84**
	John E. Pile, Sr.	North Pole	1,870	29.89
	Write-in votes		17	0.27
District 12
	**John Harris**	**Valdez**	**3,412**	**71.35**
	William R. "Bill" Johnson	Delta Junction	1,351	28.25
	Write-in votes		19	0.40
District 13
	**Carl Gatto**	**Palmer**	**5,485**	**73.02**
	Jim Wardman	Palmer	1,987	26.45
	Write-in votes		40	0.53
District 14
	Katie Hurley	Wasilla	2,674	38.70
	**Vic Kohring**	**Wasilla**	**4,218**	**61.04**
	Write-in votes		18	0.26
District 15
	**Mark Neuman**	**Big Lake**	**4,125**	**57.81**
	Myrl "Boone" Thompson	Wasilla	2,990	41.91
	Write-in votes		20	0.28
District 16
	Patricia R. Chesbro	Palmer	2,142	28.49
	**Bill Stoltze**	**Chugiak**	**5,355**	**71.23**
	Write-in votes		21	0.28
District 17
	**Anna Fairclough**	**Eagle River**	**4,583**	**70.97**
	Karla F. Huntington	Eagle River	1,848	28.62
	Write-in votes		27	0.42
District 18
	**Nancy Dahlstrom**	**Eagle River**	**2,037**	**95.99**
	Write-in votes		85	4.01
District 19
	Mary L. Pedlow	Anchorage	2,131	44.22
	**Bob Roses**	**Anchorage**	**2,672**	**55.45**
	Write-in votes		16	0.33
District 20
	**Max Gruenberg**	**Anchorage**	**1,786**	**57.72**
	Scott A. Kohlhaas	Anchorage	97	3.14
	Matt Moon	Anchorage	1,205	38.95
	Write-in votes		6	0.19

**Party**	**Candidate**	**Hometown**	**Votes**	%
District 21
	**Harry Crawford**	**Anchorage**	**3,383**	**55.43**
	Jeff Gonnason	Anchorage	2,711	44.42
	Write-in votes		9	0.15
District 22
	**Sharon Cissna**	**Anchorage**	**3,256**	**94.32**
	Write-in votes		196	5.68
District 23
	**Les Gara**	**Anchorage**	**3,881**	**95.99**
	Write-in votes		162	4.01
District 24
	**Berta Gardner**	**Anchorage**	**2,928**	**59.90**
	Darwin R. Peterson	Anchorage	1,949	39.87
	Write-in votes		11	0.23
District 25
	**Mike Doogan**	**Anchorage**	**2,931**	**70.25**
	Thomas A. Lamb	Anchorage	1,226	29.39
	Write-in votes		15	0.36
District 26
	**Lindsey Holmes**	**Anchorage**	**3,954**	**61.45**
	Steve Strait	Anchorage	2,469	38.37
	Write-in votes		11	0.17
District 27
	**Bob Buch**	**Anchorage**	**3,351**	**56.57**
	Tom Moffatt	Anchorage	2,556	43.15
	Write-in votes		17	0.29
District 28
	Valerie "Val" Baffone	Anchorage	3,278	48.34
	**Craig Johnson**	**Anchorage**	**3,483**	**51.36**
	Write-in votes		20	0.29
District 29
	**Ralph Samuels**	**Anchorage**	**2,467**	**55.87**
	Chris Tuck	Anchorage	1,940	43.93
	Write-in votes		9	0.20
District 30
	**Kevin Meyer**	**Anchorage**	**4,893**	**94.55**
	Write-in votes		282	5.45
District 31
	**Bob Lynn**	**Anchorage**	**5,920**	**95.68**
	Write-in votes		267	4.32
District 32
	Pat A. Abney	Anchorage	3,919	44.25
	William "Bill" Bartee	Anchorage	221	2.50
	**Mike Hawker**	**Anchorage**	**4,701**	**53.08**
	Write-in votes		15	0.17
District 33
	**Kurt Olson**	**Soldotna**	**3,409**	**56.31**
	John G. "Ozzie" Osborne	Kenai	437	7.22
	Pete Sprague	Soldotna	2,200	36.34
	Write-in votes		8	0.13
District 34
	**Mike Chenault**	**Nikiski**	**5,079**	**94.23**
	Write-in votes		311	5.77
District 35
	**Paul Seaton**	**Homer**	**4,465**	**68.35**
	Anthony K. Sieminski	Seward	2,024	30.98
	Write-in votes		44	0.67
District 36
	**Gabrielle LeDoux**	**Kodiak**	**2,693**	**39.87**
	Dan Ogg	Kodiak	1,811	39.87
	Write-in votes		38	0.84
District 37
	Ron Bowers	Dillingham	818	21.58
	**Bryce Edgmon**	**Dillingham**	**2,023**	**53.36**
	Write-in votes		950	25.06
District 38
	**Mary Sattler Kapsner**	**Bethel**	**3,553**	**97.40**
	Write-in votes		95	2.60
District 39
	**Richard Foster**	**Nome**	**3,687**	**97.03**
	Write-in votes		113	2.97
District 40
	**Reggie Joule**	**Kotzebue**	**3,412**	**97.82**
	Write-in votes		76	2.18

== See also ==
- 2006 United States House of Representatives election in Alaska
- 2006 Alaska gubernatorial election
