= 24th Alaska State Legislature =

Term of state legislature in Alaska, US

The 24th Alaska State Legislature served during 2005 and 2006. 9 members of the Alaska Senate were elected on November 5, 2002. The remaining senators and all members of the Alaska House of Representatives were elected on November 2, 2004.

== Sessions ==
- 1st session: January 10, 2005 – May 10, 2005
- 1st special session: May 11, 2005 – May 25, 2005
- 2nd session: January 9, 2006 – May 9, 2006
- 2nd special session: May 10, 2006 – June 8, 2006

== Alaska Senate ==
=== Make-up ===
Affiliation	Members
Republican Party	12
Democratic Party	8
Total	20
Government Majority	4

=== Members ===
District	Name	Party	Location	Term Up
A	Bert Stedman	Rep	Sitka	2008
B	Kim Elton	Dem	Juneau	2006
C	Albert Kookesh	Dem	Angoon	2008
D	Ralph Seekins	Rep	Fairbanks	2006
E	Gary Wilken	Rep	Fairbanks	2008
F	Gene Therriault	Rep	North Pole	2006
G	Lyda Green	Rep	Matanuska-Susitna	2008
H	Charlie Huggins	Rep	Wasilla	2006
I	Fred Dyson	Rep	Eagle River	2008
J	Gretchen Guess	Dem	Anchorage	2006
K	Bettye Davis	Dem	Anchorage	2008
L	Johnny Ellis	Dem	Anchorage	2006
M	Hollis French	Dem	Anchorage	2008
N	Ben Stevens	Rep	Anchorage	2006
O	John Cowdery	Rep	Anchorage	2008
P	Con Bunde	Rep	Anchorage	2006
Q	Thomas Wagoner	Rep	Kenai	2008
R	Gary Stevens	Rep	Kodiak	2006
S	Lyman Hoffman	Dem	Bethel	2006
T	Donald Olson	Dem	Nome	2008

=== Leadership ===
- Senate President: Ben Stevens (R-Anchorage)
- Senate Majority Leader: Gary Stevens (R-Kodiak)
- Senate Minority Leader: Johnny Ellis (D-Anchorage)

=== Committee assignments ===
- Committee on Committees
  - Ben Stevens (chair), Cowdery, Gary Stevens, Ellis, Hoffman
- Community & Regional Affairs
  - Gary Stevens (chair), Stedman, Wagoner, Ellis, Kookesh
- Finance
  - Green (co-chair), Wilken (co-chair), Bunde (vice-chair), Dyson, Stedman, Hoffman, Olson
- Health, Education & Social Services
  - Dyson (chair), Wilken (vice-chair), Green, Elton, Olson
- Judiciary
  - Seekins (chair), Huggins (vice-chair), Therriault, French, Guess
- Labor & Commerce
  - Bunde (chair), Seekins (vice-chair), Ben Stevens, Davis, Ellis
- Resources
  - Wagoner (chair), Seekins (vice-chair), Dyson, Ben Stevens, Stedman, Elton, Guess
- Rules
  - Cowdery (chair), Ben Stevens, Gary Stevens, Ellis, Kookesh
- State Affairs
  - Therriault (chair), Wagoner (vice-chair), Huggins, Davis, Elton
- Transportation
  - Huggins (chair), Cowdery (vice-chair), Therriault, French, Kookesh

== Alaska House of Representatives ==
=== Make-up ===
Affiliation	Members
Republican Party	26
Democratic Party	14
Total	40
Government Majority	12

=== Members ===
District	Name	Party	Location
1	Jim Elkins	Rep	Ketchikan
2	Peggy Wilson	Rep	Wrangell
3	Beth Kerttula	Dem	Juneau
4	Bruce Weyhrauch	Rep	Juneau
5	Bill Thomas	Rep	Haines
6	Woodie Salmon	Dem	Beaver
7	Mike Kelly	Rep	Fairbanks
8	David Guttenberg	Dem	Fairbanks
9	Jim Holm	Rep	Fairbanks
10	Jay Ramras	Rep	Fairbanks
11	John Coghill	Rep	North Pole
12	John Harris	Rep	Valdez
13	Carl Gatto	Rep	Palmer
14	Vic Kohring	Rep	Wasilla
15	Mark Neuman	Rep	Wasilla
16	Bill Stoltze	Rep	Chugiak/Mat-Su
17	Pete Kott	Rep	Eagle River
18	Nancy Dahlstrom	Rep	Anchorage
19	Tom Anderson	Rep	Anchorage
20	Max Gruenberg	Dem	Anchorage
21	Harry Crawford	Dem	Anchorage
22	Sharon Cissna	Dem	Anchorage
23	Les Gara	Dem	Anchorage
24	Berta Gardner	Dem	Anchorage
25	Eric Croft	Dem	Anchorage
26	Ethan Berkowitz	Dem	Anchorage
27	Norman Rokeberg	Rep	Anchorage
28	Lesil McGuire	Rep	Anchorage
29	Ralph Samuels	Rep	Anchorage
30	Kevin Meyer	Rep	Anchorage
31	Bob Lynn	Rep	Anchorage
32	Mike Hawker	Rep	Anchorage
33	Kurt Olson	Rep	Kenai
34	Mike Chenault	Rep	Nikiski
35	Paul Seaton	Rep	Homer
36	Gabrielle LeDoux	Rep	Kodiak
37	Carl Moses	Dem	Unalaska
38	Mary Kapsner	Dem	Bethel
39	Richard Foster	Dem	Nome
40	Reggie Joule	Dem	Kotzebue

=== Leadership ===
- Speaker of the House: John Harris (R-Valdez)
- House Majority Leader: John Coghill, Jr. (R-North Pole)
- House Minority Leader: Ethan Berkowitz (D-Anchorage)

=== Committee assignments ===
- Committee on Committees
  - Harris (chair), Chenault, Coghill, Meyer, Rokeberg, Berkowitz, Kerttula
- Community & Regional Affairs
  - Olson (co-chair), Thomas (co-chair), LeDoux, Kott, Neuman, Cissna, Salmon
- Finance
  - Chenault (co-chair), Meyer (co-chair), Stoltze (vice-chair), Foster, Hawker, Holm, Kelly, Weyrauch, Croft, Joule, Moses
- Health, Education & Social Services
  - Wilson (chair), Seaton (vice-chair), Anderson, Kohring, McGuire, Cissna, Gardner
- Judiciary
  - McGuire (chair), Anderson (vice-chair), Coghill, Dahlstrom, Kott, Gara, Gruenberg
- Labor & Commerce
  - Anderson (chair), Kott (vice-chair), LeDoux, Lynn, Rokeberg, Crawford, Guttenberg
- Resources
  - Ramras (co-chair), Samuels (co-chair), Elkins, Gatto, LeDoux, Olson, Seaton, Crawford, Kapsner
- Rules
  - Rokeberg (chair), Coghill (vice-chair), Harris, Kohring, McGuire, Berkowitz, Kerttula
- State Affairs
  - Seaton (chair), Gatto (vice-chair), Elkins, Lynn, Ramras, Gardner, Gruenberg
- Transportation
  - Elkins (co-chair), Gatto (co-chair), Kohring, Neuman, Thomas, Kapsner, Salmon

== See also ==
- List of Alaska State Legislatures
- 23rd Alaska State Legislature, the legislature preceding this one
- 25th Alaska State Legislature, the legislature following this one
- List of governors of Alaska
- List of speakers of the Alaska House of Representatives
- Alaska Legislature
- Alaska Senate
- {AKLeg.gov}
