= Tom Anderson (Alaska politician) =

American politician

Member of the Alaska House of Representatives from the 19th district
- In office January 21, 2003 – January 15, 2007
- Preceded by: none – newly created district (redistricting)
- Succeeded by: Bob Roses

Personal details
- Born: August 4, 1967 Anchorage, Alaska, U.S.
- Died: February 10, 2024 (aged 56) Meadow Lakes, Alaska, U.S.
- Party: Republican
- Spouses: Janet E. Hallberg (m. 1992; div. 1993); Yvonne Reynolds (m. 1998; div. 1999); Lesil McGuire (m. 2005; div. 2010); Lailanie B.G. Anderson (m. 2020)
- Children: Timothy, Tommy Jr., Kerry, Grayson
- Education: University of Alaska Anchorage (BA, MA); Hamline School of Law (JD)
- Occupation: Partner at Optima Public Relations; Radio show host

Thomas T. Anderson (August 4, 1967 – February 10, 2024) was a partner at Optima Public Relations in Anchorage, Alaska and host of the "Tom Anderson Show" radio talk show (www.TomAndersonShow.com) on KVNT 92.5 FM and 1020 AM in Anchorage and Mat-Su. Anderson, a Republican, was an Alaska state representative for District 19 representing northeast Anchorage for two terms, from 2003 to 2007. He became known for his sponsorship of legislation which expanded Alaska's DNA database to assist in forensic identification of criminal suspects through DNA testing.

On December 6, 2006, Anderson was indicted by a federal grand jury on seven felony counts of extortion, bribery, conspiracy, and money laundering involving allegations that he took bribes of nearly $13,000 in return for using his official position as a legislator to advocate for the certificate of need (CON) issuance for a residential psychiatric treatment center (RPTC) associated with the Gov. Frank Murkowski "Bring the Kids Home" initiative, and for contract changes relating to a community confinement center (halfway house) in Anchorage. In July 2007 he was found guilty on all seven felony counts and was sentenced in October 2007 to 60 months imprisonment to commence at the Federal Prison Camp in Sheridan, Oregon, on December 3, 2007. Anderson was one of seven legislators indicted, including U.S. Senator Ted Stevens, State Senator John Cowdery, former Speaker of the House Pete Kott, State Representative Bruce Weyhrauch, State Representative Vic Kohring and State Representative Beverly Masek.

== Early life and career ==
Anderson was born in Anchorage, one of two sons of Col. Tom R. Anderson, former director of the Alaska State Troopers and later general manager of the Sullivan Arena, and his wife Christiane. Anderson attended Muldoon Elementary School and Clark Junior High, and graduated from Bartlett High School in 1985. He attended University of Alaska Anchorage (UAA) from 1985 to 1993, earning a B.A. in Political Science in 1989 and an M.A. in Public Administration in 1993. Beginning in 1991, while still a student at UAA, he served as chief of staff for Representative Terry Martin, an East Anchorage Republican who was first elected to the House in 1978. In that capacity, Anderson was also an aide for the legislature's Budget and Audit Committee and the House Finance Committee. During this time he was also on the board of directors for the Anchorage Parking Authority Board from 1992 to 1995 and, from 1995 to 1996, he was vice-chair of the Anchorage Light & Power Commission.

Anderson then returned to school, attending Hamline School of Law in St. Paul, Minnesota, from 1996 to 1999, when he earned his Juris Doctor, and on returning to Anchorage became a legal and public affairs consultant. He served on the Anchorage Zoning Board of Appeals and Examiners from 1999 to 2001 and in 2000 was a member of the transition team for Anchorage Mayor George Wuerch. He also worked as a law clerk for local attorneys.

In August 2000, Anderson was appointed over 29 other applicants by the Anchorage School Board, on a vote of 5 to 1, to fill out the term of school board member Kathi Gillespie, who had resigned the previous month. In April 2001, Anderson was defeated for a full term on the board by challenger Jake Metcalfe.

== Consulting business ==
Anderson registered for a business license for a consulting business called Alaska Strategic Consultants on November 9, 1999. In 2001, Anderson, through his consulting business, had six clients, each of which paid him over $1,000. The clients included the electronic parts supplier Frigid North and the bar, restaurant, and liquor trade association Anchorage Cabaret, Hotel, Restaurant and Retailers Association (CHARR). In 2002, Anderson, acting as CHARR's executive director, received $40,800 from the association.

== Legislative career ==
=== 23rd Alaska Legislature ===
In 2002 Anderson, then serving as executive director of the Anchorage Cabaret, Hotel, Restaurant and Retailers Association (CHARR), a trade association of Anchorage-area bars and restaurants, ran as a Republican against Democrat Owen Carey for Alaska House District 19, covering the Muldoon area of Anchorage. He defeated Carey in the November 5 election.

With other legislators, Anderson was sworn into office at the state capital in Juneau as a member of the 23rd Alaska Legislature on January 21, 2003. Anderson served as chair of the House Labor and Commerce Committee and Vice-Chair of the House Judiciary Committee. He was also a member of the House committees on Community and Regional Affairs and Administrative Regulation Review, the Finance Subcommittees in the Administration, Corrections, Public Safety, and Revenue committees, and, during the first legislative session (in 2003), the Conference Committee on SJR 8.

During the first legislative session in 2003, Anderson championed House Bill 49, of which he was co-sponsor, to expand the state DNA database by requiring DNA samples from all convicted felons; any person convicted of a felony or misdemeanor crime against a person, such as assault; and anyone convicted of a misdemeanor sex offense. The bill applied the DNA sample requirement retroactively to people currently imprisoned or on parole for those crimes, as well as anyone required to register as a sex offender. Some serious juvenile offenders were also included under HB 49. The bill enjoyed wide bipartisan support, and was signed into law by Gov. Frank Murkowski on June 13, 2003. However, in October 2003 a federal judge issued a temporary restraining order which disallowed the state from requiring DNA samples from convicted sex offenders who had completed their sentences unless the state had first obtained a warrant and shown probable cause to believe a crime had been committed. Ultimately, the portion of the law requiring registered sex offenders who had completed their sentences to provide DNA samples was struck down as unconstitutional by U.S. District Judge John Sedwick; other provisions of the law remained intact.

In the second legislative session in 2004, Anderson was the House sponsor of a "payday loan" bill to regulate short-term, high-interest loans. The bill was passed and signed into law by Gov. Frank Murkowski in June 2004. Critics charges that the new law did not regulate loaners enough, still permitting them to charge fees for payday loans that amounted to interest rates of over 300 percent when calculated on an annual percentage basis. An Associated Press wire story about the bill noted that Anderson had received campaign contributions of $500 each (for a total of $1000) from the two co-owners of Cash Alaska, a payday lending company that had also hired former state senator Tim Kelly to push for the bill. (The Senate sponsor of the bill, John Cowdery, had received a $500 campaign contribution from one of the owners of the business).

=== Northeast Community Council ===
Anderson played a significant role over two years from 2002 to 2004 in changing the composition of Anchorage's Northeast Community Council to reflect more conservative political and economic views. Anderson encouraged friends and allies, including pastors and members of the locally influential Anchorage Baptist Temple, to pack the town meeting-style community council elections. By May 2004, six of the nine community council board members, including its president, were friends and political allies of Anderson. While Anchorage's community councils have no real authority, they are influential with the Anchorage Assembly because, according to Dick Traini, then chair of the Anchorage Assembly, "they are the active people in the community that choose to be involved." Community council involvement has been a first step in the political careers of several Alaska politicians.

In July 2004, Anderson was criticized in an Anchorage Daily News editorial for signing a $10,000 contract in 2003 with the Alaska oilfield services company VECO Corporation to consult "on local government and community council affairs." Anderson had earlier told the Anchorage Daily News that he'd been approached by VECO after the end of the 2003 legislative session because it was aware he'd done similar consulting work before he became a legislator. He told the newspaper that most of his work for VECO was in seeking out civic and charitable events for the company to get involved in, and that he also monitored Anchorage's community councils to see if there were zoning cases or other issues under discussion that might affect VECO. The newspaper noted that Anderson had received about $4,000 in campaign contributions from VECO employees or their spouses in the 2002 election that won him his first term in the Alaska House. By July 2004 he had received at least $3,500 in VECO-related contributions for his 2004 reelection bid.

Members of the community council later recalled Anderson attending all their meetings during 2003, and assumed he was attending as their representative in the state legislature. They did not learn he was there as a consultant for VECO until 2004, when his state financial disclosure form was filed with the Alaska Public Offices Commission, as required by law.

By the April 2006 election for Northeast Community Council, the effects of the 2004 takeover had been partially reversed, leaving the council nearly half and half liberal and conservative.

=== 24th Alaska Legislature ===
In 2004, Anderson ran for reelection to the Alaska House of Representatives. He defeated fellow Republican Louis Mayo in the August primary and in the November 2 general election defeated Democratic challenger Peggy Robinson.

In September 2005 it was disclosed that Anderson and Lesil McGuire, a fellow Republican representative from Anchorage, had married during the summer and that Anderson was moving out of his district to live with McGuire in her South Anchorage residence. Anderson stated that he intended to serve out the remainder of his term and not run for re-election. Alaska law specifies that legislative candidates must have lived in their district for at least one year immediately before filing for office, but nothing is said in the statute about legislators being required to maintain residence in their district for the entire course of their term.

=== Consulting work while in legislature ===
Outside income reported by Tom Anderson to Alaska Public Offices Commission, 2003–2005
Work performed for:	2003	2004	2005	Total
VECO Corporation	$10,000	$17,500	$2,500	$30,000
Alaska Telephone Association	$20,000	—	—	$20,000
Pacific Publishing	—	$10,000	—	$10,000
Marc Marlow	—	—	$5,000	$5,000
Annual total	$30,000	$27,500	$7,500	$65,000

Anderson continued to work as a consultant during his time in the legislature. He had a $10,000 contract with VECO Corporation in 2003 to consult "on local government and community council affairs." During his first term as a legislator, he also had a $20,000 consulting contract with the Alaska Telephone Association, a group of rural telephone companies. Anderson told the Anchorage Daily News the contract was to advise the association on member relations and to research telecommunications policies in other states. The association's executive director said the contract was to educate its members on how to be more effective in dealings with lawmakers. As chair of the House Labor and Commerce Committee, Anderson dealt in an official capacity with telecommunications issues, but Anderson said he was careful to avoid conflicts of interest and did not push his employers' interests. Anderson reported a total of $30,000 in income from VECO between 2003 and 2005.

Anderson also reported to the Alaska Public Offices Commission outside income from Pacific Publishing for $10,000 in 2004 and $5,000 from Anchorage developer Marc Marlow in 2005. In total, he received $65,000 in outside consulting fees during his first three years in office. As an outgoing legislator, Anderson was not required to report his outside income for 2006.

In 2006 after the end of the regular 2006 legislative session, Anderson registered with the Municipality of Anchorage as a municipal lobbyist and worked briefly again for Anchorage CHARR in opposition to a proposed measure to extend a smoking ban in Anchorage restaurants and most indoor public spaces to also cover bars and bingo halls. By Alaska state law, legislators are not permitted to perform lobbyist work that would require them to register with the Alaska Public Offices Commission for a full year after they leave office, but lobbying the municipality on local issues did not appear to require registration with APOC. In July Anderson was hired by the Anchorage Home Builders Association for $2,500 per month. The following month he testified before the Anchorage Assembly in favor of two stores that Wal-Mart wanted to build in his legislative district. The Northeast Community Council opposed the stores. At the Assembly meeting, Assembly chair Dan Sullivan introduced Anderson as "Representative Anderson," but Anderson corrected him, stating that he was at the meeting in representation of the home builders association, which favored the Wal-Mart stores.

Later in 2006, Anderson was hired as executive director of the Midtown Improvement District, which was then in the process of forming.

== Federal corruption probe ==
On August 31 and September 1, 2006, the FBI served some 20 search warrants in Anchorage, Juneau, Wasilla, Eagle River, Girdwood and Willow, primarily on the offices of several legislators. Anderson's office was not searched, but as it became clear that the legislators' ties to VECO Corporation was one target of the raids, Anderson, along with Sen. Ben Stevens (whose office had been searched), became the subject of articles in the Anchorage Daily News scrutinizing Anderson's and Stevens' outside incomes as consultants. Disclosure of the search warrant served on Rep. Vic Kohring, another of the six legislators searched, revealed that federal investigators were also interested in information related to Anchorage developer Marc Marlow and about Cornell Companies' effort in cooperation with VECO Corporation to build a private prison in Whittier, an effort which failed due to lack of local support. The Daily News observed, "Those documents, though lacking detail or context, suggest that the probe is wide-ranging and not focused on any one company, issue or individual."

== Bribery case ==
=== Indictment and arrest ===
On December 7, 2006, Anderson was arrested on a federal warrant at his home by agents of the Federal Bureau of Investigation and was held overnight in the Anchorage jail. Anderson had been indicted the previous day on seven counts, including two counts of extortion, one count of bribery, one count of conspiracy, and three counts of money laundering involving the use of a sham corporation to hide the origin of the bribery payments.

Anderson was specifically accused of accepting a share of $26,000 from a private corrections company funneled to him through a shell corporation called Pacific Publishing that was set up by a lobbyist, identified in Anderson's charging documents as "Lobbyist A" and later identified as prominent Anchorage lobbyist Bill Bobrick, to disguise the source of payments. Unbeknownst to Anderson or Bobrick, their contact with the private corporation's company was a confidential source of the FBI working undercover. According to federal prosecutors, the private corrections company — unidentified in the court documents but widely believed to be Cornell Companies — was not implicated in the plot, and had been unaware of the FBI investigation until Anderson's indictment and arrest. The confidential informant in the case was Frank Prewitt, a former commissioner of the Alaska Department of Corrections who took a job with Cornell Companies after it purchased Allvest. Two of the early private prisons venture partners were caught up in the ongoing Alaska political corruption probe leading to blogger and press speculation that Prewitt's service to the federal government may have been the result of a secret plea agreement although no formal charges were placed. He wore a wire to record conversations in meetings with probe targets. Court documents filed on March 22, 2010, in a criminal appeal indicated that Prewitt had been paid $200,000 for his assistance. The video of Prewitt making arrangements with Anderson was shown as evidence in the trial. Prewitt died on September 7, 2020, in Anchorage.

=== Prosecution ===
The case against Anderson was prosecuted by Nicholas A. Marsh and Edward P. Sullivan of the Public Integrity Section of the U.S. Department of Justice, as part of a larger probe of political corruption in Alaska, and Assistant U.S. Attorneys Joseph W. Bottini and James A. Goeke of the District of Alaska. Nicholas A. Marsh, 37, committed suicide two years after being part of the Justice Department team that convicted Stevens on corruption charges that were eventually thrown out. A ruling against federal prosecutors by U.S. District Court Judge Emmet Sullivan in February 2012 included a report detailing "the systematic concealment of significant exculpatory evidence" and "widespread and at times intentional misconduct" by Justice Department lawyers during the prosecution of the late Sen. Ted Stevens, R-Alaska, be made public by March 15, 2012.

=== Defense ===
Anderson was represented by Anchorage attorney Paul Stockler, a former state prosecutor who usually handles civil litigation. Stockler successfully defended an Anchorage aviation company against federal weapons charges in a prominent case in 2006. Anderson had originally hoped to be represented by attorney Jeff Feldman, but Feldman's caseload, which included representation of BP in an investigation and prosecution arising out of an oil spill on Alaska's North Slope in 2006 made it impossible for him to take on Anderson's defense as well.

A letter soliciting funds for the Tom Anderson Defense Fund was sent to about 100 individuals in February 2007 in order to help Anderson defray legal costs, which it was estimated would cost up to $250,000 due to extensive pretrial preparation and a trial which was expected to last about two weeks.

=== Bobrick charged, pled guilty ===
On May 14, 2007, William "Bill" Bobrick, a prominent municipal lobbyist in Anchorage and former executive director of the Alaska Democratic Party, was charged with one count of conspiracy to commit extortion, bribery, and money laundering in the same scheme for which Anderson was indicted the previous December. Bobrick was the creator of the shell corporation, Pacific Publishing, through which money was allegedly funneled to Anderson. Bobrick also received money through the scheme. Bobrick appeared in U.S. District Court in Anchorage on May 16, where he entered a guilty plea. Bobrick will not be sentenced until after the trial of Tom Anderson, scheduled to begin June 25, where Bobrick will testify for the prosecution. Under sentencing guidelines Bobrick faced a possible 2 to 2 1/2 years imprisonment, but his sentence was five months in prison and five months home confinement plus fines and community service.

=== Trial and sentencing ===
Anderson's trial was originally scheduled to begin on February 12, 2007, was changed to April 9, 2007, and was later rescheduled to begin on June 25, 2007, in order to give Anderson's attorney sufficient time to review evidence.

Jury selection for the trial began on June 25, 2007, drawing from a pool of 102 potential jurors from as far away as Dillingham and Bethel. Several potential jurors were challenged because they had already made judgments about Anderson's guilt or innocence or for other reasons. One potential juror was excluded because she had researched Anderson on Wikipedia.

On July 9, 2007, after a half-day of deliberations and another half of a day to come to their conclusions, a jury found Anderson guilty on all seven charges of extortion, bribery, conspiracy and money laundering. Anderson said he would appeal the verdict, claiming that, ""The prosecution has criminalized being a legislator over this past year. And I think I fell victim to that." His sentencing was scheduled for October 2, 2007, but was delayed until October 14, 2007. Anderson faced a maximum penalty of 20 years imprisonment and a $250,000 fine on the extortion counts; 20 years and a $500,000 fine on each of the money laundering counts; 10 years and a $250,000 fine on the bribery count; and five years and a $250,000 fine on the conspiracy count. He was ultimately sentenced to a term of 60 months in prison and was required to surrender to the Federal Prison Camp in Sheridan, Oregon, on December 3, 2007. Anderson was released from FCI Sheridan on February 1, 2011. He was designated to a Federal Community Corrections Center (halfway house) in Seattle, Washington until May 2011 and then returned home to Anchorage.

== Personal ==
In 2010, while Anderson was serving time in federal prison in Oregon, his third wife, State Senator Lesil McGuire, divorced him.

Anderson died in Meadow Lakes, near Wasilla, Alaska, on February 10, 2024.

== See also ==
- Alaska political corruption probe
