= Alaska political corruption probe =

Widespread 2003 to 2010 investigation by the U.S. Department of Justice

The Alaska political corruption probe refers to a 2003 to 2010 widespread investigation by the Public Integrity Section of the U.S. Department of Justice, the Federal Bureau of Investigation, and the Internal Revenue Service into political corruption of nine then-current or former Alaskan state lawmakers, as well as Republican US Representative Don Young and then-US Senator, Republican Ted Stevens. Sometimes referred to as "The Corrupt Bastards Club" or the "Operation Polar Pen", the investigation focused on the oil industry, fisheries and for-profit prison industries.

By the spring of 2006, the FBI set up in a Baranof hotel suite just three blocks away from the capitol building in Juneau. From their position in the hotel suite, they gathered evidence, such as a videotape of VECO's CEO Bill Allen arranging paper money for legislators, and made other observations. By August 2008, the investigation resulted in indictments against six sitting or former Alaska Republican state legislators on corruption charges. In August 2008 US Senator Ted Stevens was indicted and, by October, he was convicted in Washington, D.C., on seven felony counts of failure to disclose gifts. The convictions, eight days before the November 2008 election, resulted in his narrow loss, after 40 years in the U.S. Senate, to Democrat Mark Begich. This makes him the most senior U.S. senator to lose a bid for re-election, defeating Warren Magnuson's record in 1980. His convictions were later set aside because of prosecutorial misconduct and the United States Department of Justice ended further prosecution.

In addition to the conviction of US Senator Stevens, two executives of the VECO Corporation, an oilfield services contractor, pleaded guilty to charges of bribery and conspiracy to impede the Internal Revenue Service. Alaska businessmen/lobbyists Bill Weimar (former for-profit halfway house owner) and Bill Bobrick, as well as Jim Clark, the former governor's chief of staff, also were indicted and convicted. Clark's guilty plea and sentence were later vacated before he was ordered to report to custody. That was followed by ex-Alaska State Rep. Bruce Weyhrauch's Supreme Court challenge to the honest services fraud statute. His case was decided on June 24, 2010, in association with the Skilling v. United States and Conrad Black case decisions. While the Court overturned the Skilling conviction, stating that the honest services fraud statute was not applicable to private citizens, the Court upheld, but narrowed the application of the honest services fraud statute by stating that it was applicable to public officials only, and remanding Weyhrauch's conviction to the 9th Circuit Court of Appeals.

Federal prosecutors later agreed not to retry Weyhrauch on felony charges in exchange for Weyhrauch's agreement to plead guilty to a single misdemeanor in an Alaska State Court. An Alaska state court judge then gave Weyhrauch a three-month suspended jail sentence and a $1,000 fine.

== History ==
The probe began in 2004 or earlier. By 2006 the name "Corrupt Bastards Club" (alternatively "Corrupt Bastards Caucus") began being used to designate Alaska legislators implicated in the federal corruption (a.k.a., "Polar Pen") investigation. The nickname originated in the spring of 2006 as a barroom joke among Alaska legislators after the publication of a guest article by Lori Backes, executive director of the All Alaska Alliance. It ran in Alaska's three largest newspapers and named 11 lawmakers who had received large campaign contributions from executives of the oilfield services company VECO Corporation. VECO had a long history of making substantial campaign contributions to Alaska politicians. The article also named Senate President Ben Stevens, son of U.S. Senator Ted Stevens, as having received large consulting fees from VECO.

In her article, Backes detailed the extent of political campaign donations contributed between 1998 and 2004 by the top seven VECO executives to Alaska lawmakers who were in office at the time her article was written. The figures were based on reports made by contributors and recipients to the Alaska Public Offices Commission.

- Senator John Cowdery (R-Anchorage), Senate Rules Committee Chair: $24,550.
- Representative Pete Kott (R-Eagle River), former speaker of the House: $21,300.
- Representative Norman Rokeberg (R-Anchorage), House Rules Committee Chair: $18,000.
- Representative Vic Kohring (R-Wasilla), House Oil and Gas Committee Chair: $14,708.
- Governor Frank Murkowski (R): $6,500 (excluding donations to prior U.S. Senate races).
- Representative (later state Senator and Lieutenant Governor) Kevin Meyer (R-Anchorage), House Finance Committee Co-Chair: $12,300.
- Representative Mike Chenault (R-Nikiski), House Finance Committee Co-Chair: $12,000.
- Representative (later Senator) Lesil McGuire (R-Anchorage), House Judiciary Committee Chair: $12,000.
- Senator Con Bunde (R-Anchorage), Senate Labor and Commerce Committee Chair: $11,500.
- Senator Lyda Green (R-Wasilla), Senate Finance Committee Co-Chair: $9,000.
- Representative Mike Hawker (R-Anchorage): $8,050.
- Representative Tom Anderson (R-Anchorage), House Labor and Commerce Chair: $8,000.

Additionally, Backes noted the consulting contract Senate President Ben Stevens (R-Anchorage) had with VECO Corporation and financial relationships other lawmakers had with other companies active in the oil and gas industry, including ConocoPhillips and ASCG Incorporated, the latter a subsidiary of the Alaska Native-owned Arctic Slope Regional Corporation which is heavily involved in oilfield business in Alaska.

According to Chenault, one of the lawmakers named in the article: "Somebody walked up [in the bar] and said, 'You corrupt bastards,' and that name stuck." Hats with the label "CBC," standing for "Corrupt Bastards Club" or "Corrupt Bastards Caucus," were later printed up, but according to Chenault "that was the extent of the CBC deal."

In the first week of August 2006, an ill Representative Carl E. Moses returned to the state capitol in Juneau after receiving medical treatment in Anchorage, to cast a critical vote that ensured passage of a bill giving tax breaks to the oil industry. The vote took place, shortly after Moses received campaign contributions from Bill Allen and five other VECO executives, the only Democrat to receive any from that source.

The FBI had set up in a Baranof hotel suite just three blocks away from the capitol building in Juneau. There they videotaped VECO's CEO Bill Allen, peeling off bills for legislators to stuff in their pockets. According to the Juneau Empire, Ray Metcalfe said he had spoken with FBI agents about the case, but didn't know how the feds first got interested in Alaska. "I think the jury is still out on what started this," said Metcalfe. Juneau Mayor Bruce Botelho, the longest-serving attorney general in the state's history, appointed during the successive administrations of Republican Wally Hickel, and Democrat Tony Knowles said it appeared that those state agencies responsible for ensuring ethical government had failed to do their jobs, but it was too soon to tell for sure.

=== Raids on legislative offices ===
On August 31 and September 1, 2006, the FBI served some 20 search warrants in Anchorage, Juneau, Wasilla, Eagle River, Girdwood, and Willow, primarily on the district and capitol offices of several legislators. Republican legislators whose offices were searched included Senator John Cowdery, Senate President (and son of U.S. Senator Ted Stevens) Ben Stevens, Representatives Vic Kohring, Bruce Weyhrauch, Pete Kott and Bev Masek as well as Democratic Senator Donny Olson. The warrants permitted the search of computer files, personal diaries, Alaska Public Offices Commission reports, and any other items showing evidence of financial ties between legislators and the oilfield services company VECO Corporation, as well as clothing items with the phrase "Corrupt Bastards Club" or its related acronym printed on it. A search warrant for Sen. Olson's Juneau office, made available by his office to the public, specifically authorized the seizure of documents relating to VECO Corporation executives Bill Allen (CEO), Richard Smith (vice president), Pete Leathard (president), and Roger Chan (chief financial officer). The warrant also authorized the seizure of clothing, including hats, bearing the logos or phrases "VECO," "Corrupt Bastards Caucus," "Corrupt Bastards Club," or "CBC" printed on them.

John Cowdery was indicted for bribery and extortion under official right and bribery concerning programs that receive federal funding.

=== Management of corruption investigation ===
It later emerged that the investigation of political corruption in Alaska was being managed not by the Alaska U.S. Attorney's office, but rather by the Public Integrity Section of the U.S. Department of Justice in Washington, D.C., with FBI agents working out of the FBI building in downtown Anchorage acting as lead investigators. The FBI raids on legislative offices on August 31 and September 1 involved dozens of extra FBI agents brought up from the Lower 48 but returned home after the initial round of searches and interviews. Other agencies, including the Internal Revenue Service, were also involved.

The Public Integrity Section, created in 1976, is charged with the investigation of election fraud, misconduct by federal judges, and corruption of elected officials in all levels of government — federal, state, and local. While U.S. Attorney offices also investigate and prosecute public corruption cases, because U.S. Attorneys are political appointees in local jurisdictions, they are sometimes recused from particular cases.

Brooke Miles, then-executive director of the Alaska Public Offices Commission, reported that the FBI began to collect public campaign reports and financial disclosure records on selected Alaska legislators perhaps a year prior to the raids, and returned at the start of 2006 to obtain such records for all legislators.

=== Investigation widens ===
==== Fisheries ====
The FBI conducted a second search on the legislative office of Republican State Senator Ben Stevens on September 18, 2006, seizing among other items documents related to the proposed natural gas pipeline and the oil and gas tax law which had been discussed in the Alaska Legislature during the regular and two special legislative sessions in 2006, as well as items related to his work on the Senate Ethics Committee and documents related to fisheries. Stevens disclosed to the Anchorage Daily News that the FBI seized items during both searches of his office related to the Alaska Fisheries Marketing Board (AFMB), created under legislation by Ben Steven's father, U.S. Senator Ted Stevens, to distribute federal grants to promote Alaska seafood. Ben Stevens had been chair of AFMB until early in 2006. He had received consulting fees from at least three organizations that had benefited from the grants — over $250,000 during the time he served on the board. Other documents related to fisheries were also seized in the September 18 FBI search. One of these was a copy of an affidavit by Victor Smith, a salmon fisherman from Friday Harbor who alleged that Stevens had been paid by a seiners association to lobby his father and that he failed to disclose that income as required by Alaska law.

==== Private corrections ====
In October 2006, Rep. Vic Kohring's attorney, Wayne Anthony Ross, provided the Anchorage Daily News with a copy of the search warrant that had been served on Kohring on August 31, as well as a list of items seized. The warrant showed that federal investigators were also interested in information related to developer Marc Marlow and correspondence between Kohring and the Alaska Department of Corrections. Ross told the Anchorage Daily News that his client had been questioned by the FBI about Cornell Companies' (purchased by GEO Group in 2010) effort, in cooperation with VECO Corporation, to build a for-profit prison in Whittier. That scheme failed due to gubernatorial and bipartisan legislative opposition. The Daily News observed, "Those documents, though lacking detail or context, suggest that the probe is wide-ranging and not focused on any one company, issue or individual."

=== Tom Anderson arrested on federal bribery and extortion charges ===
The observation by the Anchorage Daily News and other news organizations, that the probe had a wider focus than legislators' ties to the VECO Corporation, was confirmed on December 7, 2006, when outgoing Representative Tom Anderson - whose offices had not been targeted by the August and September FBI raids — was arrested on allegations of extortion, bribery, conspiracy, and money laundering involving his support of a private corrections company. Anderson was accused of accepting money from the company, CorPlan, through a shell corporation set up by a lobbyist, identified in Anderson's charging documents as "Lobbyist A," and later identified as prominent Anchorage lobbyist Bill Bobrick, to disguise the source of payments. Unbeknownst to Anderson or Bobrick, their contact with the private corrections company was a confidential source of the FBI working undercover. According to federal prosecutors, the private corrections company — unidentified in the court documents but widely believed to be Cornell Companies — was not implicated in the plot, and had been unaware of the FBI investigation until Anderson's indictment and arrest. The confidential informant in the case was Frank Prewitt, a former commissioner of the Alaska Department of Corrections. After leaving state employ, Prewitt took positions first with halfway house entrepreneur Bill Weimar, serving on his Allvest corporation board of directors, and subsequently with Cornell Companies, which bought out Weimar to establish its Alaska operations. Court documents filed on March 22, 2010, in a criminal appeal indicated that Prewitt had been paid $200,000 for his assistance in investigating and convicting his former Allvest associates.

=== Subpoenas of fisheries businesses ===
Additional subpoenas were served on fishery executives involved with federal funding and the United Fishermen of Alaska who have had business associations with Ben Stevens.

== Figures of note ==
Name	Indicted	Pleaded guilty/convicted	Sentenced	Sentence	Started serving	Current location
Bill Allen	Yes	May 7, 2007	October 28, 2009	Three years, $750,000 fine	January 12, 2010	Released from New Mexico halfway house on November 22, 2011. Died June 30, 2022, in Grand Junction, Colorado.
Tom Anderson	Yes	July 9, 2007	October 15, 2007	60 months	December 3, 2007	Released to halfway house 2/1/11, from probation 5/11.
Bill Bobrick	Yes	May 16, 2007	November 27, 2007	5 months		Released June 6, 2008
Jim Clark	Yes	March 4, 2008	Court vacated indictment and plea	Vacated		All charges dropped
John Cowdery	Yes	December 19, 2008	March 10, 2009	6 months house arrest, $25,000 fine		Died July 13, 2013
Vic Kohring	Yes	November 1, 2007	May 8, 2008	3½ years		Pleaded guilty after previous conviction overturned, sentenced to time served, plus one year of supervised release. Released October 21, 2011. Died September 6, 2022.
Pete Kott	Yes	September 25, 2007	December 7, 2007	72 months	January 17, 2008	Pleaded guilty after previous conviction was overturned, sentenced to time already served, three years supervised release, fine of $10,000.
Beverly Masek	Yes	March 12, 2009	September 23, 2009	six months+3 years probation	November 11, 2009	Released May 7, 2010
Donald Olson	No					Refused bribe, still serving in Senate
Rick Smith	Yes	May 7, 2007	October 28, 2009	21 months, $10,000 fine		Released July 20, 2011.
Ben Stevens	No					In December 2018, Stevens was named by incoming Republican Governor Mike Dunleavy, as an advisor on legislation, transportation and fishing.
Ted Stevens	Yes	October 27, 2008	Convictions voided, no retrial was held			Died in plane crash, August 9, 2010
Jerry Ward	No					Headed Alaska Trump 2016 presidential campaign
Bill Weimar	Yes	August 11, 2008	Nov 12, 2008	6 months and $75,000 fine		Completed federal sentence on July 2, 2009, and afterward, probation. Captured in February 2011, after fleeing to Cuba and Mexico after Sarasota, Florida, child sexual abuse allegations. Charges eventually dropped.
Bruce Weyhrauch	Yes			Federal charges dismissed, guilty plea to state charges, $1,000 fine, received probation		Private practice of law in Juneau
Don Young	No					Died on March 18, 2022, while serving in Congress

=== Indictment, arrest of Kott, Kohring and Weyhrauch ===
On May 4, 2007, former Representatives Pete Kott (R-Eagle River) and Bruce Weyhrauch (R-Juneau) were arrested and charged with bribery, extortion wire and mail fraud. Then-Representative Vic Kohring (R-Wasilla) later turned himself in and was similarly charged. All three were arraigned in Juneau. Charges against the three involved allegations of soliciting and receiving money and favors from VECO chief executive officer Bill Allen and chief lobbyist and V.P. Richard L. "Rick" Smith in return for their votes on an oil tax law favored by the VECO that was the subject of vigorous debate during the 2006 legislative session and two special sessions in 2006.

Kott and Kohring were both convicted, but their convictions were later vacated due to alleged misconduct by the prosecuting attorneys. In 2011 both agreed to plead guilty. Prosecutors agreed to recommend both men be sentenced to time served and subject to conditions upon release. Kohring lost his latest bid to appeal his conviction, turned down unanimously by an en banc hearing of the 9th Circuit Court of Appeals.

After federal charges were dropped, Weyhrauch pleaded guilty to a misdemeanor lobbying violation, his sentence was suspended, and he was fined $1,000. It was estimated he had spent $300,000 on his defense. In 2016, the state senate's Select Committee on Legislative Ethics found that Weyhrauch had committed ethics violations a decade earlier and requested he pay a fine of $18,100 and write and publicize a letter of apology regarding the situation. Two years later, the requests for the apology and payment of the fine were waived.

Of the original seven lawmakers who had their legislative offices searched, only Democratic State Senator Don Olson (D-Nome), who had refused a bribe, was not implicated in the scandal and helped the FBI to make their cases.

=== VECO executives indicted, plead guilty ===
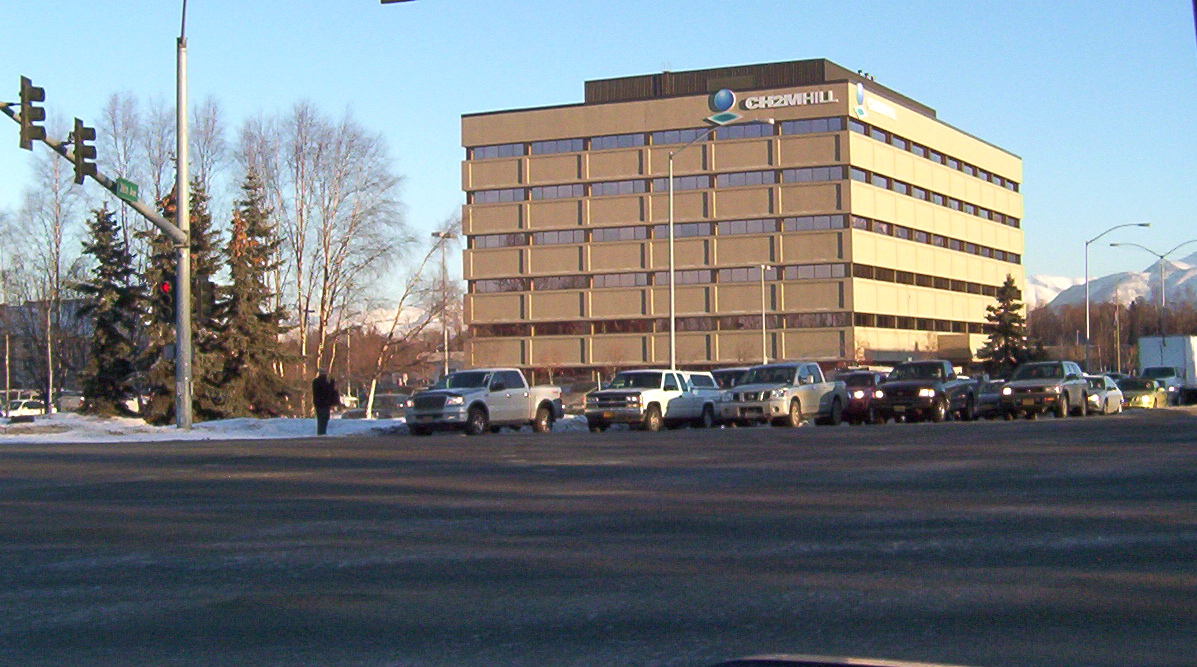
In the wake of the scandal VECO was broken up and most of its assets, including its former Alaska headquarters in Anchorage, were purchased by CH2M Hill.

On May 7, 2007, VECO CEO Bill Allen and Vice President for Community & Government Affairs Rick Smith pleaded guilty in U.S. District Court in Anchorage to charges of extortion, bribery, and conspiracy to impede the Internal Revenue Service.

In addition to the three politicians arraigned on May 4, the new court filings mention illegal payments made to a former state senator, named as "Senator B" in court documents, who received over $240,000 from VECO Corp. over several years, income which Senator B reported as "consulting fees." In the May 7 guilty pleas by Allen and Smith, they admit that the only work done by Senator B in exchange for the funds was advancing VECO's agenda in the state legislature. The only former state senator who matches the information contained in court documents about Senator B is former Senator Ben Stevens (R-Anchorage), son of U.S. Senator Ted Stevens (R-Alaska). Ben Stevens was not indicted. Another state senator discussed in the court documents, identified as "Senator A" in court documents, was identified by sources as John Cowdery.

On May 11, 2007, at a meeting of the VECO Corporation's board of directors and shareholders, Bill Allen resigned as the company's CEO and chairman of its board of directors, citing "the best interest of the corporation, all of our companies, and our many valued employees and customers." Allen's daughter Tammy Kerrigan replaced him as chairman of the board; a new CEO had not yet been chosen. At the same meeting, Rick Smith resigned from his position as vice president of community and government affairs. It was not clear from the VECO statement if Smith's position will be refilled.

=== Lobbyist Bill Bobrick charged, pleads guilty in Tom Anderson bribery probe ===
On May 14, 2007, William (Bill) Bobrick, a prominent municipal lobbyist in Anchorage, was charged with one count of conspiracy to commit extortion, bribery, and money laundering in the same scheme for which Rep. Tom Anderson was indicted the previous December. Bobrick was the creator of the shell corporation, Pacific Publishing, through which money was allegedly funneled to Anderson. Bobrick also received money through the scheme. Bobrick appeared in U.S. District Court in Anchorage on May 16, where he entered a guilty plea. Bobrick was sentenced after the trial of Tom Anderson, scheduled to begin June 25, where Bobrick testified for the prosecution. Under sentencing guidelines, Bobrick faced a possible 2 to 2½ years imprisonment, but his sentence was reduced to six months in return for his cooperation with prosecutors.

In reaction to Bobrick's part in the corruption scandal, the Anchorage Assembly on May 22, 2007, unanimously approved a measure that prohibits individuals who have been convicted of a felony within the past 10 years of registering as a lobbyist with the Municipality of Anchorage.

=== US Senator Ted Stevens investigated, charged, convicted, and verdict vacated ===
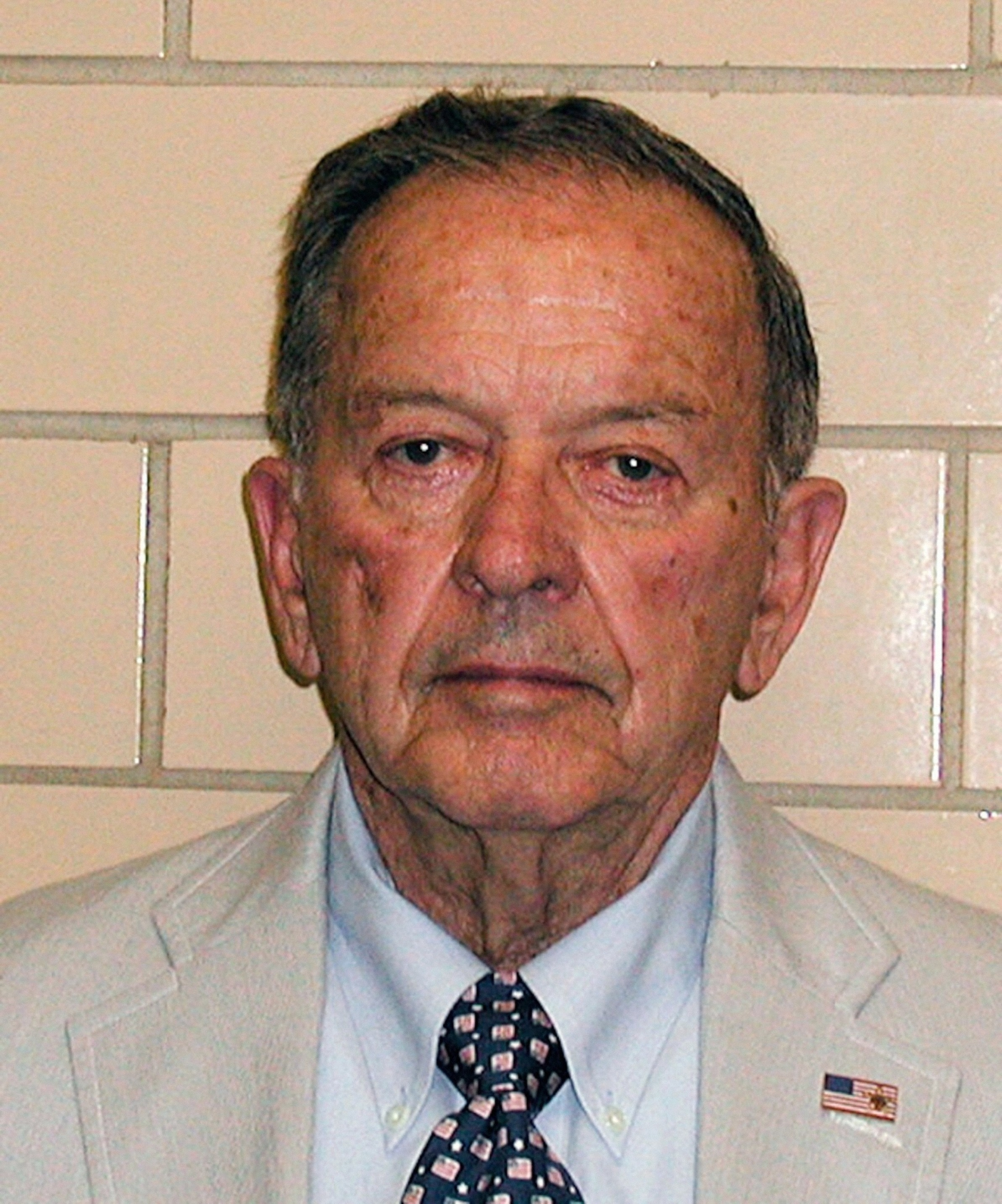
Mug shot of Ted Stevens, taken by the United States Marshals Service in July 2008

Ted Stevens was also investigated by both the FBI and IRS. Authorities investigated an extensive remodeling project done at the Stevens "chalet" in the small town of Girdwood, Alaska. Unusual aspects of this remodeling project that were investigated were that the project was supervised by VECO, and invoices for the work on the residence were first sent to VECO before being sent to the senator. Some of the issues investigated were the extent of work done on the home, exactly who had paid the invoices from the construction contractors and their subcontractors, and the purpose and extent of VECO's involvement.

On the morning of July 30, 2007, agents from the FBI and the IRS raided the residence in Girdwood. Photographs and video of the inside and outside of the residence were taken. Wine bottles in the home were photographed as objects of interest. The raid continued well into the evening.

On July 29, 2008, just a day short of the anniversary of the Girdwood raids, Stevens was charged with seven counts of false statements on financial disclosures involving VECO, the oil services company in Alaska, and the renovations done on his home.

On October 27, 2008, U.S. Senator Ted Stevens was successfully prosecuted in the District of Columbia. He was found guilty by a jury of all seven felonies against him. The case had been prosecuted by Principal Deputy Chief Brenda K. Morris, Trial Attorneys Nicholas A. Marsh and Edward P. Sullivan of the Criminal Division's Public Integrity Section, headed by Chief William M. Welch II, and Assistant U.S. Attorneys Joseph W. Bottini and James A. Goeke from the District of Alaska. Eight days after the verdict, Stevens narrowly lost re-election to Anchorage's Democratic then-Mayor Mark Begich. He had held his seat since December 24, 1968.

On February 13, 2009, U.S. District Judge Emmet G. Sullivan cited William M. Welch II, Brenda K. Morris, Patty Merkamp Stemler (Chief of the Justice Department Criminal Appeals Section), and another Justice Department attorney for contempt of court. Judge Sullivan amended the contempt citation on February 14, 2009 to remove the fourth attorney. The contempt citation was for failing to turn over to defense counsel for former Senator Stevens documents relating to a complaint by Chad Joy, a Federal Bureau of Investigation agent, alleging misconduct by prosecutors in the Stevens case. Judge Sullivan had ordered, on February 3, 2009, that the documents in question be given to defense counsel. In the contempt citation, Judge Sullivan described the conduct of the Justice Department's lawyers as "outrageous."

On February 16, 2009, the Justice Department stated in a court filing that it had removed six attorneys from "litigation relating to allegations of misconduct in (the case against former Senator Stevens)." The six attorneys were William M. Welch II, Brenda K. Morris, Nicholas A. Marsh, Edward P. Sullivan, Joseph W. Bottini, and James A. Goeke.

On April 1, 2009, Attorney General Eric Holder decided to drop all charges against Stevens after a review of the case turned up alleged evidence of prosecutorial misconduct, including failure to fully disclose potentially exculpatory evidence in response to a Brady motion by Stevens' attorneys. Since Stevens had not yet been sentenced, Holder's action effectively vacated Stevens' conviction.

Prosecutor Marsh, although he had been removed as the team leader of the Alaska probe's prosecution, well prior to the Stevens debacle, had become episodically depressed as a result of the extreme length of the investigation into the conduct of the team involved in the Senator's case. This was exacerbated by his consequent reassignment to less favorable international duties, pending resolution of the inquiry, though he had anticipated complete exoneration. On September 26, 2010, not long after he returned from a trip to Europe, he hanged himself in the basement of his home in Takoma Park, Maryland.

Stevens meanwhile, 17 months after leaving office, died in a corporate executive airplane crash on August 9, 2010. He had been en route to a remote hunting lodge in western Alaska.

=== US drops Jim Clark corruption conviction ===
In 2008, Clark admitted that he was aware that Veco Corp had paid $10,000 for a political poll to gauge the popularity of then-incumbent Governor Murkowski, and was charged with "honest services fraud". Before he was sentenced, the US Supreme Court ruled that the statute was drafted with unconstitutional vagueness and henceforth will only cover "fraudulent schemes to deprive another of honest services through bribes or kickbacks supplied by a third party who ha[s] not been deceived." Since Clark was guilty of neither bribes nor kickbacks, all charges were voided.

=== Bill Weimar pleads guilty to making illegal campaign contributions ===
On August 11, 2008, the Anchorage Daily News reported that Bill Weimar, a former operator of halfway houses for inmates in Alaska was indicted and charged with two felony counts alleging campaign finance violations. Weimar funneled money to an unnamed consultant for an unnamed state legislative candidate in 2004. Weimar agreed to plead guilty to the charges, and in exchange, prosecutors will ask for a reduced sentence, a nonbinding agreement that the judge is free to modify. Weimar subsequently pleaded guilty in federal court in Anchorage. His sentencing occurred on November 12, 2008. Weimar was sentenced to 6 months in federal prison and ordered to pay a US $75,000 fine. In 2010, Weimar who was on federal probation after serving six months in prison for illegal campaign contributions, allegedly forced sex on a six-year-old Sarasota girl. After being indicted on January 23, 2011, he fled to Havana, Cuba. From there he flew to Cancun, Mexico where he was arrested on his yacht and extradited back to Florida.

=== Jerry Ward implicated in probe ===
On December 15, 2008, the Anchorage Daily News reported that former Alaska state senator Jerry Ward had been implicated in the probe. Ward had been accused of a conspiracy involving Bill Weimar to accept an illegal $20,000 campaign contribution. Weimar had a $5.5 million interest, contingent only on the approval and construction of a Cornell Companies prison in Alaska. On August 23, 2004 he paid $3,000 by check toward settlement of a $20,000 invoice. Later that day he forwarded $8,500 in cash drawn from a Polson, Montana bank by express mail followed a day later by $8,500 more in cash drawn from the same bank, according to court documents. Cash transactions of more than $10,000 daily mandate federal reporting per the Bank Secrecy Act. Ward allegedly convinced a witness in the trial against Senator Ted Stevens to lie about an immunity deal in court to ensure that he was included in it and would therefore not be prosecuted. According to federal prosecutors, Ward had been under investigation for some time over his relationship with Weimar, who was convicted of two felony counts in the matter and sentenced to prison. While he was presumed to be under continued investigation, Ward was not charged.

=== Donny Olson refuses bribes, assists FBI ===
Democratic Senator Donny Olson was running for Lieutenant Governor in 2006. He was offered but refused a $25,000 campaign contribution, later cooperating with the FBI to bring cases against the conspirators.

=== John Cowdery pleads guilty ===
On December 18, 2008 KTUU Anchorage Channel 2, an affiliate of NBC, reported that John Cowdery had agreed to change his plea from not guilty to guilty in exchange for some of the charges against him being dropped. As part of his plea agreement, Cowdery did not have to testify against other defendants in the case. No sentencing parameters were agreed upon as a result of this agreement. Cowdery subsequently pleaded guilty in federal court on December 19, 2008. Due in part to his age and alleged infirmity, he was only sentenced to 6 months of house arrest and fined US$25,000. Cowdery died on July 13, 2013.

=== Beverly Masek pleads guilty ===
On March 13, 2009, the Anchorage Daily News reported that former Alaska state representative Beverly Masek had pleaded guilty to soliciting and accepting at least $4,000 in bribes from VECO Corp. Masek, who originally rose to fame by competing in the Iditarod Trail Sled Dog Race while still known by her maiden name of Beverly Jerue, was first elected to the House in 1994. Masek represented a district consisting of the northern and western reaches of the Matanuska-Susitna Borough in the House from 1995 to 2005 before being defeated by Mark Neuman in the 2004 primary election. Masek was sentenced on September 23, 2009.

== See also ==
- Alaska Legislature
- Public Integrity Section
- OpenSecrets
