= Federal Correctional Institution, Sheridan =

Medium-security prison in Oregon, US

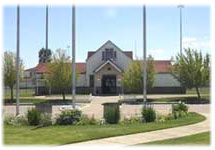
- Front entrance into FCI Sheridan
- Interactive map of Federal Correctional Institution, Sheridan
- Location: Sheridan, Oregon, United States; 45°05′02″N 123°22′54″W
- Status: Operational
- Security class: Medium-security (with minimum-security prison camp)
- Capacity: 2000
- Population: 1462 (214 in prison camp) (May 2025)
- Opened: 1989
- Managed by: Federal Bureau of Prisons
- Warden: Israel Jacquez
- Website: https://www.bop.gov/locations/institutions/she/

The Federal Correctional Institution, Sheridan (FCI Sheridan) is a medium-security United States federal prison for male inmates in Oregon. Opened in 1989, it is operated by the Federal Bureau of Prisons, a division of the United States Department of Justice. The facility also includes a detention center housing male offenders and an adjacent minimum-security satellite prison camp also for male offenders. FCI Sheridan is located in Sheridan, Yamhill County, northwestern Oregon.

== History ==
Sheridan, Oregon, began campaigning to be the site of the first federal prison in Oregon in 1981. Then Senator Mark Hatfield and Congressman Les AuCoin worked to help get Sheridan selected as the site for the prison. Federal prison officials began looking at sites around Sheridan to build a proposed $50 million minimum and medium security prison in 1985. Plans called for the prison to be built on farmland south of the city. Some local residents opposed building the facility near Sheridan and created a group to fight the government. In August 1986, the 182-acre (74 ha) location south of Sheridan was approved by the Federal Bureau of Prisons. These early plans called for a 250-person minimum security unit, a 550-person minimum security unit, with a total cost of $48 million. The Delphian School's campus was also a candidate for the location of the prison.

State and county governments expanded Sheridan's urban growth boundary to include the prison site in 1986, which opponents then fought in court. These efforts, along with two ballot measures in November 1986, all failed, and groundbreaking for construction was held in March 1987. Local businesses and the city had sought the prison to provide jobs in the area. Sheridan expanded its water and wastewater treatment systems at a cost of $2.2 million as part of the project.

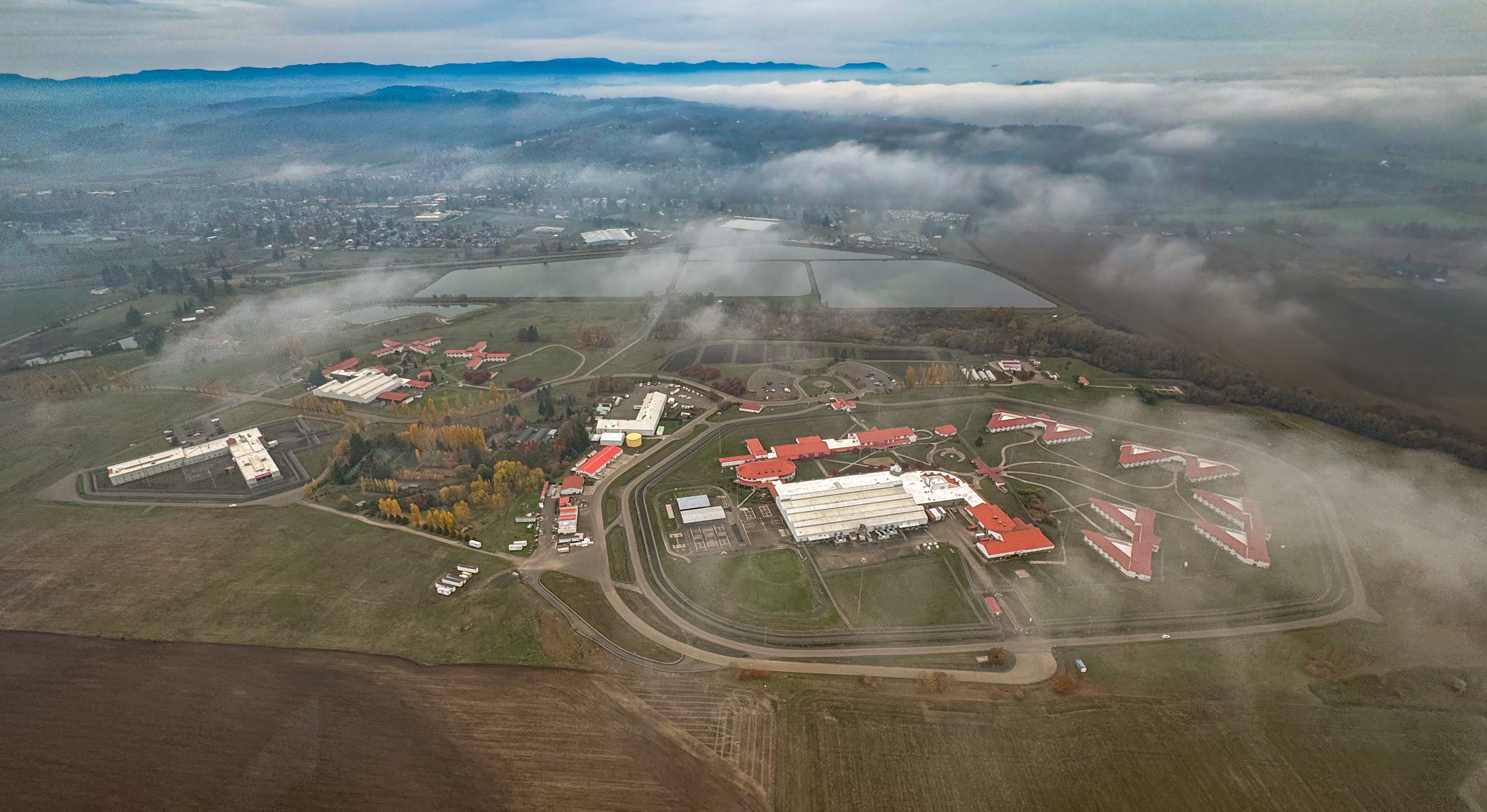
Facility from above with some clouds

FCI Sheridan opened in May 1989 with George Killinger as the warden. Oregon's first federal prison cost $52 million to build. Construction began in 1987 with a design to hold 550 inmates at the prison portion and an additional 256 camp prisoners. Portland's Hoffman Construction Company built the prison for the federal government. The prison was officially dedicated on August 24, 1989. FCI Sheridan experienced a riot in September 1993 that destroyed one building when inmates set it on fire. Another lockdown occurred in September 2003 when 40 prisoners were involved in fights using homemade weapons. In December 1994, an additional 300 beds were added to the facility as a federal detention center for housing pre-trial inmates. The separate facility from the main prison cost $10 million to build.

The Oregon Legislature passed a law in 1999 that prevented inmates in federal prisons from voting in local elections. Since Oregon had never had a federal prison before FCI was established, only state prisoners had previously been barred from voting. In 2000, the U.S. Census Bureau mistakenly listed the prison population in one census tract instead of the correct census tract. Oregon Secretary of State Bill Bradbury used the incorrect data when re-drawing the state's legislative districts as is done after each census. This small error of about 2000 people was enough to throw off the districts beyond their margin of acceptance and the Oregon Supreme Court ruled the Secretary must re-draw the boundary lines to match the correct data. The city also counts the prison population as part of the city's official population.

== Facility ==
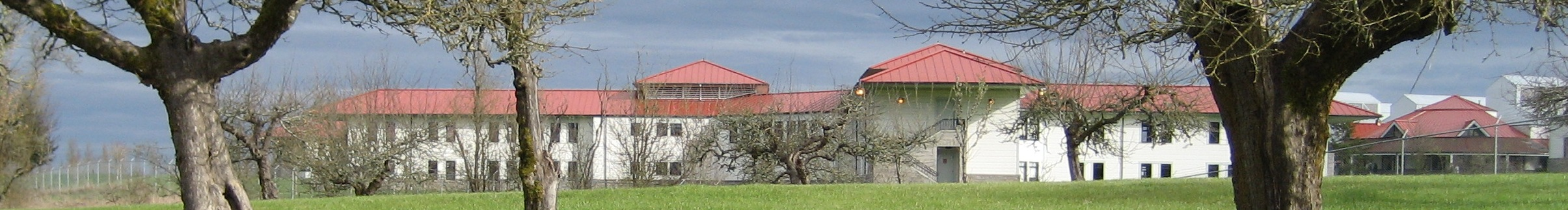
FCI Sheridan's satellite camp

As of May 29, 2025, FCI holds 1,462 inmates, with 214 of these in the minimum-security prison camp. The current warden is Israel Jacquez. FCI is the only federal prison in Oregon.

The facility is designed in a style that resembles college campuses that are meant to foster rehabilitation. Buildings housing inmates have white exteriors with red-colored roofs. These concrete, two-story structures are modeled after dormitories. The factory buildings have roof lines that are meant to mimic the area's agricultural architecture.

The prison industry (UNICOR) was a wood shop for the manufacturing of furniture until it was closed down in 2006. Furniture included desks and office chairs. Inmates at the minimum security camp can study to work as landscape gardeners and personal fitness trainers after their release from prison.

== Notable incidents ==
=== 2000s ===
In April 2007, federal prosecutors indicted 13 people, including a correction officer, James Stephen Rolen, at FCI Sheridan, on charges involving bribery and conspiracy to smuggle heroin, marijuana and drug paraphernalia into the prison. Mr. Rolen was subsequently convicted and in March 2008 was sentenced to 24 months in federal prison, followed by 2 years of supervised release.

=== 2010s ===
In March 2012, Rafael Hall, a 24-year-old inmate, died at FCI Sheridan. Hall and 30 other alleged members of the Rolling 60s, a subset of the Crips street gang, were arrested during an anti-gang operation involving the Portland Police Bureau and the FBI in December 2011. Hall was awaiting trial on charges of cocaine distribution and had pleaded not guilty. The Yamhill County Medical Examiner subsequently ruled the death a suicide. The charges against Hall were dismissed due to his death.

In late May 2018, 124 asylum seekers were transferred to FDC Sheridan as a part of the Trump administration's "Zero Tolerance" immigration policy. For nearly a month, the individuals detained were held in near isolation and were not allowed to contact their families or lawyers. Many of these individuals were forcibly separated from their families, including their children, as a part of the Trump administration family separation policy. As the result of an emergency lawsuit by the ACLU of Oregon, failure to provide access to legal counsel was deemed unconstitutional. As of November 2018, all immigration detainees have been released from FDC Sheridan, the majority of whom were released according to law to live with family, friends, or sponsors as they pursue their asylum claims in immigration court.

=== 2020s ===
During the COVID-19 pandemic, concerns about carceral facilities across the United States began to mount, with reports describing worsening conditions for prisoners, exacerbation of existing staffing shortages, and disproportionately high COVID-19 infection rates among both prisoners and staff at facilities nationwide.

On March 23, 2020, Oregon State Governor Kate Brown issued a general stay-at-home order. On March 31, FCI Sheridan entered a two-week COVID-19 lockdown, which was then extended through May 18. On April 3, Attorney General William Barr ordered that the Federal Bureau of Prisons must review "all at-risk" inmates and consider them for compassionate release.

In June 2020, Oregon federal public defender Lisa Hay filed a petition for habeas corpus on behalf of an inmate at FCI Sheridan, alleging that conditions had worsened for prisoners. The documents described poor food quality, restricted food options, lack of shower access, prohibitively long wait lines for phones and computers, and increasingly restricted access to communication devices, showers, or time spent outside of their cells. It was also alleged that many in custody were not wearing masks, and that social distancing protocols were not followed consistently enough to adequately protect inmates. FCI Sheridan announced its first confirmed COVID-19 infection in early July.

Following a January 2021 spike in COVID-19-related deaths at Oregon facilities, federal judge Stacie Beckerman ordered that all unvaccinated inmates in the state of Oregon must be offered COVID-19 vaccines. The Oregon Department of Corrections (ODOC) announced in March 2021 that they had offered vaccines to all inmates in the state, with 10% of inmates fully vaccinated and 69% having received at least one dose of the

On August 12, 2021, 42-year-old inmate Ikaika Ryan Chung was pronounced dead at a nearby hospital, having been transported there due to low blood pressure, low blood sugar, and elevated heartrate. A few days later, OPB reported that Oregon federal public defender Lisa Hay had submitted a court filing alleging that the conditions inside FCI Sheridan were "dangerous and unbearable" and "could reasonably be considered excessive punishment". At the time, FCI Sheridan had the second-highest rate of active COVID-19 infections in a U.S. prison, with 30 active infections out of a population of over 1,500. Later that month, FCI Sheridan announced its first COVID-19-related death since the January spike.

Judge Beckerman ordered an inspection of the facility, to be carried out within two weeks.

== Notable inmates ==
=== Current ===
| Inmate Name | Register Number | Photo | Status | Details |
|---|---|---|---|---|
| Leslie Isben Rogge | 13915-004 | | Serving a 65-year sentence; scheduled for release on May 29, 2034. | Serial bank robber; robbed 30 banks of $2 million between 1990 and 1995; Rogge was one of the FBI Ten Most Wanted Fugitives and was the first one caught on the Internet. |
| Terrence Deshon Williams | 68554-509 | | Serving a 10-year sentence; scheduled for release in 2030. | Former player of the Brooklyn Nets who was involved in a scheme to defraud the healthcare plan of the NBA. |

=== Former ===
| Inmate Name | Register Number | Status | Details |
|---|---|---|---|
| Demetrius Flenory | 13037-078 | Transferred to the United States Penitentiary, Lompoc. Serving a 30-year sentence; scheduled for release on May 5, 2028. | Convicted in 2008 as a leader of the Black Mafia Family under the Continuing Criminal Enterprise Statute for drug trafficking and money laundering. The BMF operated a large scale cocaine distribution network throughout the United States from 1990 through 2005. The DEA has seized more than 630 kilograms of cocaine and $14 million in cash and assets in connection with BMF investigations. |
| Tre Arrow | 70936-065 | Released from custody in 2009; served a 78-month sentence. | Member of the ecoterrorist group Earth Liberation Front; convicted on several arson charges. |
| Russell Cline | 67512-065 | Released from custody in 2012; served 5 years. | Founder of Orion International, a foreign currency trading firm; pleaded in 2004 to mail fraud and money laundering for misappropriating customer funds to pay for personal expenses and pay others who participated in the scheme. |
| Stacey Koon | 99752-012 | Released from custody in 1995; served 14 months. | Former LAPD sergeant; convicted in 1993 of federal civil rights violations in connection with the 1992 beating of Rodney King; his acquittal in state court sparked the 1992 Los Angeles riots. |
| Tom Anderson | 15340-006 | Released from custody in 2009. | Former members of the Alaska House of Representatives; convicted of extortion, bribery, conspiracy, and money laundering as a result of the Alaska political corruption probe. |
| Pete Kott | 15407-006 | Released from custody in 2011. | Former members of the Alaska House of Representatives; convicted of extortion, bribery, conspiracy, and money laundering as a result of the Alaska political corruption probe. |
| Suge Knight | 02731-112 | Released from custody in 2001 | Convicted for a 1994 federal firearms offense in Las Vegas, entered federal custody in May 2001. |
| Andrew Wiederhorn | 67914-065 | Released from custody in 2005; served 15 months. | Founder of the now-defunct Wilshire Credit Corporation; pleaded guilty in 2004 to giving an illegal gratuity and filing a false tax return; current CEO of the Fatburger restaurant chain. |
| Robert Gomez | 24210-112 | Released from custody on January 19, 2022. | Convicted in 2003 of orchestrating the Miracle cars scam, in which over 4,000 people bought 7,000 cars that did not exist, losing $21 million; accomplice James Nichols was sentenced to 24 years; the story was featured on the CNBC show American Greed. |

== See also ==
- Capital punishment in Oregon
- Incarceration in the United States
- List of law enforcement agencies in Oregon
- List of Oregon prisons and jails
- List of United States federal prisons
