= Beverly Masek =

American politician

Beverly L. "Bev" Masek

Member of the Alaska House of Representatives from the 15th district
- In office January 14, 2003 – January 18, 2005
- Preceded by: Eric Croft
- Succeeded by: Mark Neuman

Member of the Alaska House of Representatives from the 28th district
- In office January 17, 1995 – January 14, 2003
- Preceded by: Curt Menard
- Succeeded by: Lesil McGuire

Personal details
- Born: September 30, 1963 (age 63) Anvik, Alaska, U.S.
- Party: Republican

Beverly L. "Bev" Masek (née Jerue) (born September 30, 1963) is an Alaska Native and an American former dog sled racer, and businesswoman. She was a Republican politician who served in the state legislature for several terms.

== Early life, education and career ==
Beverly Jerue was born in Anvik, Alaska in 1963 to an Alaska Native family. She attended local schools, graduating from Anvik High School.

"Bev" married Jan Masek, an immigrant from Czechoslovakia. Together the couple have owned a racing dog kennel and a lodge. Jerue worked as a bookkeeper.

Jerue had learned about sled dogs from childhood. She was active in dog sled racing from the early 1980s to the early 1990s, competing five times in the Iditarod Trail Sled Dog Race. She finished the race four times, including as 21st in 1991 and 23rd the next year.

== Political career ==
Jerue became active in the Republican Party, and was elected to the Alaska House of Representatives for several terms, starting in 1994. She served 1995–2005. Masek won an open seat in an election year in which, in the other legislative contests in the Matanuska-Susitna Valley, Democratic incumbents lost to their Republican challengers.

Masek missed 29 floor sessions in 2001—the highest absentee rate in the House. The next year she was absent from 16 sessions. She was in the hallway when a key budget vote was cast on the House floor in 2002. Masek was chairwoman of the House Resources Committee. She was notable as an Alaska Native lawmaker who was opposed to a state constitutional amendment to grant priority to rural subsistence

Rep. Pete Kott, R-Eagle River, who was vying to be the next House speaker, gave Masek $500 for her 2002 campaign. She also received $1,500 from executives with VECO Corp., which was involved in trying to build a for-profit private prison in Alaska, and Anchorage architecture firm Koonce Pfeffer and Bettis, which was tabbed to design the prospective prison. Rep. Vic Kohring, R-Wasilla, moved to his parents' home in 2002 in order to establish residence there and avoid a primary fight with Masek after portions of their districts were combined.

=== Indictment and conviction ===
In 2009, Masek pleaded guilty in the Alaska political corruption probe which was a wide-ranging investigation into bribery in the state legislature stemming from the VECO Corporation, an oil servicing company. She was sentenced to six months in prison with three years probation. VECO CEO Bill Allen and Vice President Rick Smith, legislators Pete Kott (R), as well as John Cowdery (R), Vic Kohring (R), and Tom Anderson were all sentenced to federal prison in the scandal. James Clark (R) Chief of Staff to Republican Governor Frank Murkowski, and US Senator Theodore F. Stevens (R-AK) were also convicted, but the charges were reversed on appeal.

== See also ==
- List of Native American politicians
- Native American women in politics
