= Bruce Weyhrauch =

American politician

Member of the Alaska House of Representatives from the 4th district
- In office January 2003 – January 2007
- Preceded by: Bill Hudson
- Succeeded by: Andrea Doll

Personal details
- Born: February 14, 1953 (age 73) Lincoln, Nebraska, U.S.
- Party: Republican
- Spouse: LuAnn Bailey Weyhrauch
- Children: Benjamin, Maria, Barclay
- Education: Humboldt State University, B.S., Lewis and Clark, J.D.
- Profession: Lawyer
- Website: http://www.bruceweyhrauch.com

Bruce Weyhrauch (born February 14, 1953) is an American attorney and former politician who represented Juneau's District 4 in the Alaska State House, Alaska, United States.

== Education and career ==
Weyhrauch received his BS in natural resource planning and engineering from Humboldt State University and his JD from Lewis and Clark College, where he served as the editor-in-chief of Environmental Law.

Weyhrauch has operated a law office in Juneau for nearly three decades. His practice focuses on regulatory and government affairs, including labor relations and natural resources.

== Indictment, conviction and Supreme Court case reversal ==
In May 2007, Weyhrauch, along with fellow Republican state House members Pete Kott and Vic Kohring, were charged in connection with a scandal involving oilfield service company VECO attempting to buy government favors in Alaska. The ensuing investigation led to the widely publicized indictment, trial and convictions of United States Senator Ted Stevens in October 2008, and the indictments and convictions of former representatives Tom Anderson and Beverly Masek and state Senator John Cowdery, as well as VECO chairman Bill Allen and vice president Richard Smith. Alaska businessmen/lobbyists Bill Weimar (former for-profit halfway house owner), Bill Bobrick, and Jim Clark, chief of staff for former governor Frank Murkowski, also were indicted and convicted. Clark's guilty plea and sentence were later vacated before he was ordered to report to custody.

Weyrauch had been charged with bribery, extortion, conspiracy and mail fraud. After being found guilty in a trial, on October 15, 2007, he was sentenced to five years in prison. He appealed, and subsequently his proceedings were granted an indefinite stay while issues involved were re-examined by the U.S. Supreme Court. This was followed by Weyhrauch prevailing at the Supreme Court on a challenge to the honest services fraud statute. His case was decided on June 24, 2010, in association with the similar Skilling v. United States and Conrad Black case decisions.

Weyhrauch's federal case was remanded to the 9th Circuit Court of Appeal, and as a result of this re-examination, all federal charges were dismissed. He pleaded guilty to a misdemeanor lobbying violation, was given a suspended sentence and probation, and was fined $1,000. It was estimated he had spent $300,000 on his defense.

== Personal life ==
Weyhrauch is an Eagle Scout and has served on the BSA's Southeast Alaska Council Executive Board.

=== Boating incident ===
Weyhrauch was stranded on Coghlan Island in the Juneau area on April 22, 2007. After he fell out of his boat at about 6 pm, he was forced to swim to the island. The Coast Guard searched for Weyhrauch during the night. A volunteer rescue team from the nonprofit organization SEADOGS found him alive at approximately 11 am the next morning.
