= Wes Keller =

American politician (born 1946)

Member of the Alaska House of Representatives from the 14th district
- Incumbent
- Assumed office July 27, 2007
- Preceded by: Vic Kohring

Personal details
- Born: April 24, 1946 (age 80) Minneapolis, Minnesota, U.S.
- Party: Republican
- Education: University of Alaska Fairbanks
- Profession: Construction Contractor

Wes Keller (born April 24, 1946) is a Republican member of the Alaska House of Representatives, representing the 14th District. He is currently serving as Co-Chair of the Health & Social Services Committee, Chair of the Administrative Regulation Review Committee, and is a member of the Community & Regional Affairs Committee, Education Committee, and the Fisheries Special Committee. He also serves on the Administration and Law Finance Subcommittees, for the 26th Legislature. Before elected to office Wes Keller was a building maintenance and construction contractor. Keller is a member of the American Legislative Exchange Council (ALEC), serving as Alaska state leader.

== Personal life ==
Representative Keller has a wife: Gayle, three children: Matt, April & Zach, and five grandchildren. Wes Keller graduated from Central High School, Superior, Wisconsin in 1964 and received a Bachelor of Science in Broad Field Science Major with minors in Math and Physics from the University of Wisconsin–Superior in 1986.

== Girl Scouts ==
In 2012, Representative Wes Keller blocked a resolution honoring the 100th anniversary of the Girl Scouts due to internet rumors that the Girl Scouts were linked to Planned Parenthood. He stated "I'm sure you are aware of the information that's floating around the internet, and I'd like to give you the opportunity to respond to your connection, the Girl Scout connection, with Planned Parenthood and the activist role in that — is there a connection? Is there not? Frankly, I haven't looked into it but I see it's out there," Keller later softened his tone, praising the Girl Scouts but refusing to let the resolution pass.

== Ties to ALEC ==
Wes Keller is a current member of ALEC, serving as its state leader and has attended conferences in 2011 and 2014
