= Pete Petersen (politician) =

American politician

Member of the Alaska House of Representatives from the 19th district
- In office January 20, 2009 – January 2013
- Preceded by: Bob Roses
- Succeeded by: Lance Pruitt (redistricting)

Personal details
- Born: December 25, 1950 (age 75) Wyoming, Iowa, U.S.
- Party: Democratic
- Education: University of Northern Iowa
- Occupation: Property management, former restaurant owner

James F. "Pete" Petersen is a former member of the Alaska House of Representatives from District 25 in Northeast Anchorage. He introduced well known bills to outlaw price gouging by Alaska oil refineries and to require health insurance policies to cover treatment for autism. Petersen is a member of the Democratic Party.

== Background ==
Pete Petersen was born in Wyoming, Iowa and grew up on a family farm in rural Iowa. He has lived in Anchorage since 2008; he has owned and operated a pizza and sandwich delivery restaurant in Anchorage for over 15 years. He is a graduate of the University of Northern Iowa and served as a Peace Corps volunteer in the Dominican Republic.

== Legislative career ==
Petersen was elected to the State House in November 2008 winning against Republican incumbent Bob Roses by 235 votes. In the 26th Alaska State Legislature he served on the House Energy, State Affairs, and Transportation Committees as well as on the Finance Subcommittees for the Departments of Education and Early Development and Environmental Conservation.
