= Coghlan Island =

Island in Alaska, United States

- Interactive map of Coghlan Island

Geography
- Location: Juneau City and Borough, Alaska
- Coordinates: 58°21′12″N 134°41′50″W
- Archipelago: Alexander Archipelago
- Length: 1 mi (2 km)
- Highest elevation: 177 ft (53.9 m)

Administration
- United States
- State: Alaska
- Borough: Juneau

Coghlan Island is an island in the City and Borough of Juneau, Alaska, United States. Located in Stephens Passage, it is 1.2 miles (1.0 nmi; 1.9 km) south of Fairhaven and 11 miles (9.6 nmi; 18 km) northwest of the city of Juneau. It was named in 1885 by the United States Coast and Geodetic Survey for United States Navy officer Joseph Coghlan, who commanded the USS Adams during its survey of southeastern Alaska from 1883 to 1884.

== History ==
Former Alaska state legislator Bruce Weyhrauch was stranded on Coghlan Island on April 22, 2007, after he fell out of his boat at about 6 pm; he was forced to swim to the island. The United States Coast Guard District Seventeen, Sector Juneau, searched for Weyhrauch during the night. A volunteer rescue team from the nonprofit organization SEADOGS located him at approximately 11 am on April 23.

A Federal Aviation Administration non-directional radio beacon is located on the island. It transmits the Morse code callsign CGL on a frequency of 212 kHz.

== Notable flora and fauna ==
Coghlan Island was noted as the northernmost location of specimens of Triopha catalinae, a type of sea slug.
