= Ben Stevens =

American politician (1959–2022)

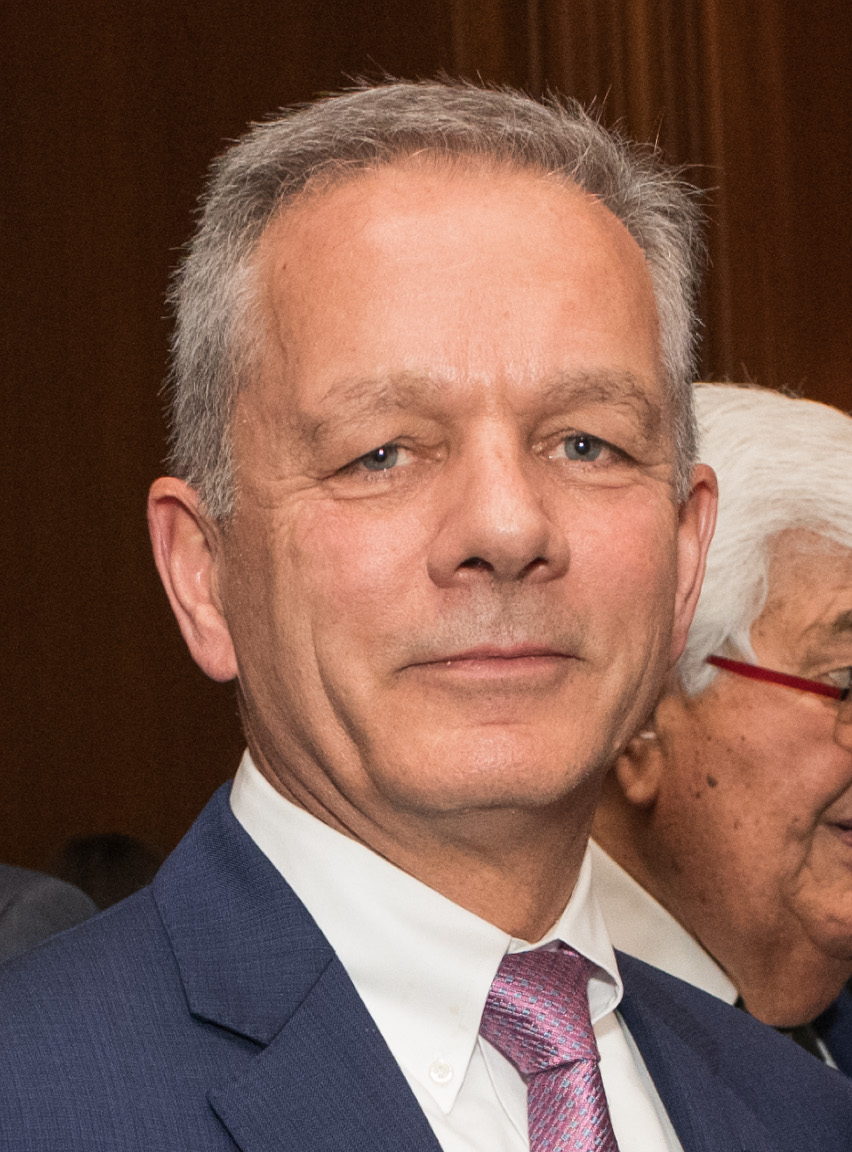
- Stevens in 2019

Chief of Staff to the Governor of Alaska
- In office July 31, 2019 – March 3, 2021
- Governor: Mike Dunleavy
- Preceded by: Tuckerman Babcock
- Succeeded by: Randall Ruaro

President of the Alaska Senate
- In office January 10, 2005 – January 16, 2007
- Preceded by: Gene Therriault
- Succeeded by: Lyda Green

Majority Leader of the Alaska Senate
- In office January 21, 2003 – January 10, 2005
- Preceded by: Loren Leman
- Succeeded by: Gary Stevens

Member of the Alaska State Senate
- In office August 6, 2001 – January 15, 2007
- Preceded by: Drue Pearce
- Succeeded by: Lesil McGuire
- Constituency: F district (2001–2003); N district (2003–2007)

Personal details
- Born: Benjamin Aavan Stevens; March 18, 1959 Washington, D.C., U.S.
- Died: October 13, 2022 (aged 63) Chugach National Forest, Alaska, U.S.
- Party: Republican
- Parent: Ted Stevens (father)
- Education: Arizona State University (BA); George Washington University (MBA)

Benjamin Aavan Stevens (March 18, 1959 – October 13, 2022) was an American politician and political advisor who served as the Chief of Staff to the Governor of Alaska, Mike Dunleavy. He previously served as the President of the Alaska State Senate as a member of the Republican Party. Stevens was the son of the late United States Senator Ted Stevens, who represented Alaska from 1968 to 2009.

== Education ==
Stevens earned a Bachelor of Arts in economics from the Arizona State University and a Master of Business Administration from George Washington University.

== Career ==
After college, he was a commercial fisherman and owner of a consulting firm. Stevens was president of the May 2001 Special Olympics World Winter Games, held in Anchorage.

In August 2001, Stevens was appointed by Democratic Governor Tony Knowles to the Alaska State Senate after being nominated by the Republican Party of Alaska. He was the Majority Leader for the 2003–2004 term, and the President for the 2005–2006 term.

=== Alaska political corruption probe ===
Stevens was investigated by the FBI in connection with an ongoing Alaska political corruption probe, though he was not charged with any crime. His office was visited twice by FBI agents who seized evidence, including documents relating to an alleged payment scheme involving fisheries legislation. Bill Allen, the head of the oil field services company VECO Corporation, testified in a September 2007 trial that he had bribed Ben Stevens and two other state legislators, and also testified in the trial of Ted Stevens. In his six years in the Alaska Senate, Ben had received $240,000 from VECO for unspecified consulting fees. In September 2007, Stevens called an Anchorage talk radio show to proclaim his innocence. He said he "didn't do anything illegal" and that he worked in the state's best interest as a senator. Ben also received $13,490 from Veco employees in 2002 with $5,500 coming from VECO's investigated executives. Within one week in 2002, Stevens received the maximum $500 contribution allowed by law from each of the six executives involved in the bribery scheme.

A 2003 legislative earmark gave the Alaska Native community at Adak Island (and thereby Adak Fisheries) exclusive rights to pollock fishing, worth millions of dollars to Adak Fisheries. Beginning in July 2002, Stevens held a secret option, expiring in December 2004, to buy a 25% ownership in Adak for an immediate payment of $50,000 and another $450,000 paid over time. In mid-2004, 50% of Adak was sold for $4.3 million to a Seattle company. In November 2004, Stevens attempted to exercise the option, but because of changes in ownership of Adak, the complexity of the agreement between Aleut and Adak, and subsequent litigation, his $50,000 check was never cashed and Stevens did not get any ownership rights. Adak Fisheries paid Stevens $295,000 between 2000 and 2004.

On October 2, 2008, U.S. District Judge in Washington, D.C. Emmet G. Sullivan denied the mistrial petition of Ted Stevens's chief counsel, Brendan Sullivan, regarding allegations of withholding evidence by prosecutors. However, the latter were admonished and submitted themselves for an internal probe by the United States Department of Justice. The precedent embodied in the Brady v. Maryland decision had required prosecutors to provide defendants with any material exculpatory evidence. On October 27, 2008, Ted Stevens was found guilty of all seven felony counts of making false statements concerning the failure to report gifts, and making false statements. Nonetheless, during a debate with his opponent, Anchorage, Alaska Mayor Mark Begich, days after his conviction, Stevens continued to claim innocence. "I have not been convicted. I have a case pending against me, and probably the worst case of prosecutorial misconduct by the prosecutors that is known." Stevens also cited plans to appeal. On November 4, 2008, eight days after his conviction, Begich went on to defeat Stevens by 3,724 votes. On April 7, 2009, federal judge Sullivan formally accepted President Barack Obama's Attorney General Eric Holder's motion to set aside the Ted Stevens verdict and throw out the indictment, declaring "There was never a judgment of conviction in this case. The jury's verdict is being set aside and has no legal effect."

=== Post-legislative career ===
After deciding not to seek re-election to the state senate in 2006, Stevens continued to hold a post as a member of the Republican National Committee. In September 2007, two of the state's top Republican elected officials, Alaska Governor Sarah Palin and House Speaker John Harris called on Stevens to resign from the RNC, because he was under a federal investigation for his ties to the oil field services company, VECO Corporation.

In December 2018, Stevens was named by incoming Republican Governor Mike Dunleavy as an advisor on legislation, transportation and fishing. Before the appointment, Stevens had served as the president of Cook Inlet Tug and Barge. In July 2019, he became Dunleavy's chief of staff, replacing Tuckerman Babcock.

In mid 2021, Stevens took on the role of Vice President, External Affairs and Transportation with ConocoPhillips Alaska.

== Personal life and death ==
Stevens was born in Washington, D.C..

When Stevens was 19, his mother and father were severely injured in a plane crash on December 4, 1978. His mother did not survive while his father suffered a concussion. His father was ultimately able to survive the plane crash. However, his father would die in another plane crash on August 9, 2010 at the age of 86 while on a fishing trip.

Alaska State Troopers responded to an emergency report in the Chugach National Forest on the night of October 13, 2022, where Stevens was experiencing a medical emergency. Attempts to save his life were unsuccessful.

Alaska Senate
Preceded by Drue Pearce	Member of the Alaska Senate from F district 2001–2003	Succeeded by Gene Therriault
Preceded by Lyda Green	Member of the Alaska Senate from N district 2003–2007	Succeeded by Lesil McGuire
Preceded by Loren Leman	Majority Leader of the Alaska Senate; 2003–2005	Succeeded by Gary Stevens
Political offices
Preceded by Gene Therriault	President of the Alaska Senate; 2005–2007	Succeeded by Lyda Green
