= Anna MacKinnon =

American politician (born 1957)

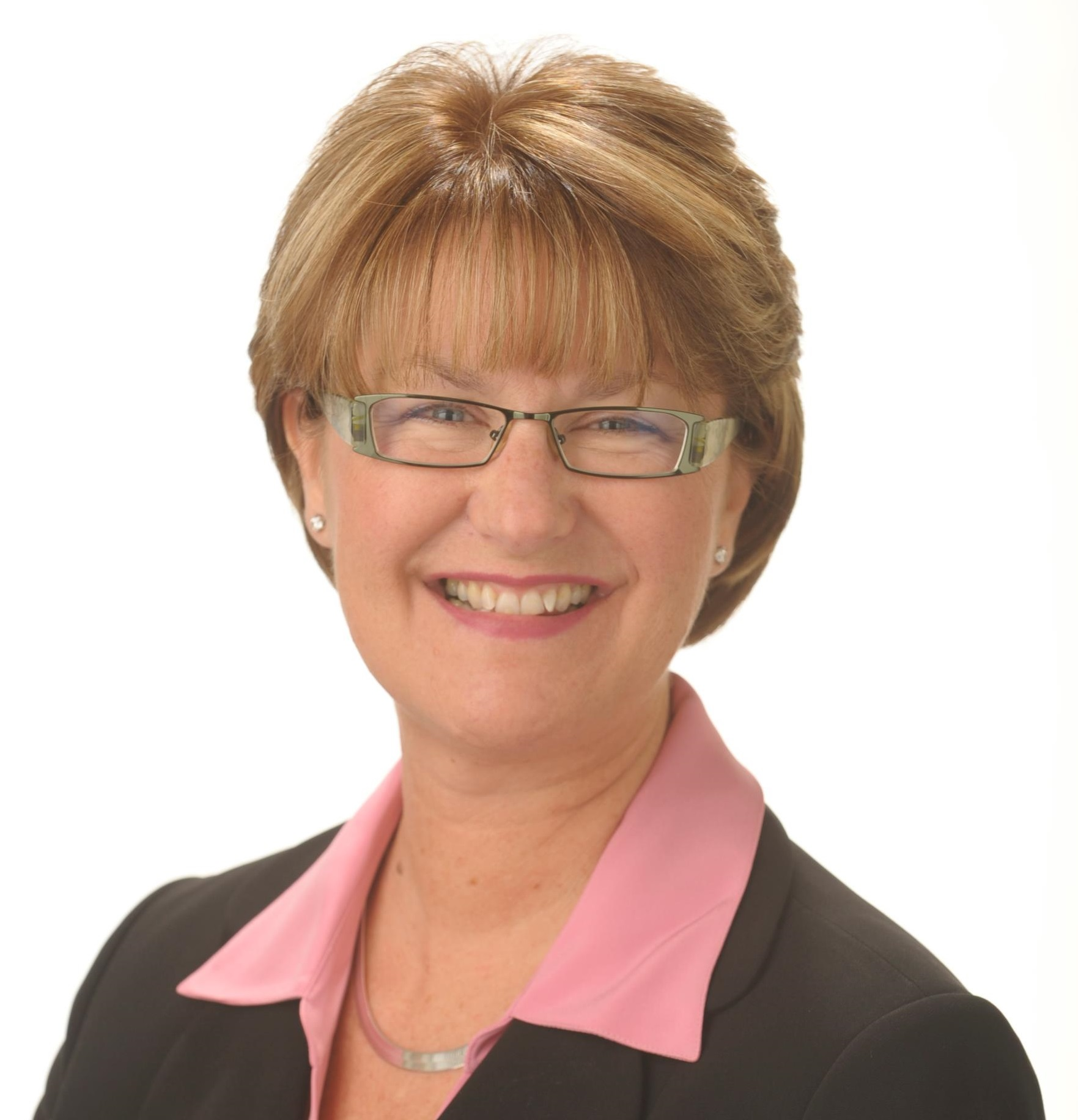

Member of the Alaska Senate from the G district
- In office January 15, 2013 – May 15, 2018
- Preceded by: Bill Wielechowski
- Succeeded by: Lora Reinbold

Member of the Alaska House of Representatives from the 17th district
- In office January 16, 2007 – January 15, 2013
- Preceded by: Pete Kott
- Succeeded by: Geran Tarr

Personal details
- Born: November 11, 1957 (age 68) Auburn, Washington, U.S.
- Party: Republican
- Education: University of Alaska Anchorage, University of Alaska Fairbanks
- Occupation: Development director

Anna MacKinnon (formerly Fairclough; born November 11, 1957) is an American Republican politician who is formerly a member of the Alaska Senate, representing District G from 2013 to 2018. Prior to that, she served in the Alaska House of Representatives, representing the 17th district, from 2007 to 2013. In the 26th Alaska State Legislature, she was a member of the House Finance Committee, and chair of the Education & Early Development, Labor & Workforce Development and the University Of Alaska Finance Subcommittees. She also represented Eagle River and Chugiak on the Anchorage Assembly from 1999 until being elected to the House. She was elected to each of these offices by defeating an incumbent in the election; her Assembly victory was over incumbent Ted Carlson, better known as the Anchorage police officer who arrested actor Steve McQueen in 1972. Her House victory came in the 2006 primary over incumbent Pete Kott, who by that point was involved in what became known as the Alaska political corruption probe, and who was later sentenced to federal prison. The probe also saw other longtime legislators leave office. Her Senate victory in 2012 came over longtime legislator Bettye Davis, who faced not only redistricting but a primary election challenge from former House member and congressional candidate Harry Crawford, whom Davis narrowly outpolled.

== Personal life ==
MacKinnon has two children, Cory and Garret and 2 grand children. She is a graduate of Service High School, and also attended school for a time in Unalaska. She later studied finance at the University of Alaska Anchorage and the University of Alaska Fairbanks although she did not obtain an undergraduate degree.

Formerly Anna Fairclough, she changed her last name after marrying John MacKinnon on September 20, 2014.
