= Jim Clark (Alaska official) =

Chief of Staff to the Governor of Alaska
- In office 2002–2006
- Governor: Frank Murkowski

Personal details
- Born: 1943 (age 82–83) New York, U.S.
- Party: Republican
- Education: Johns Hopkins University (BA); Cornell University (JD); George Washington University (LLM)

James Clark (born 1943 in New York) served as chief of staff to the governor of Alaska during the administration of former Alaska Governor Frank Murkowski.

== Early life ==
Jim Clark was born in New York in 1943 to Air Force Colonel James and Marie Clark. As a child he lived in Anchorage, Alaska - but his family was evacuated during the Korean War. He also lived in Japan and Hawaii during his childhood. Clark received his BA degree in History, Literature and Philosophy from Johns Hopkins University in Baltimore 1965, his Juris Doctor degree from Cornell Law School in Ithaca, New York in 1968 and his LLM degree in environmental law from George Washington University in Washington, D.C. in 1973.

== JAG Corp ==
Between 1969 and 1973 he served in the JAG Corps of the U.S. Army where he litigated criminal matters in special and general courts martial. He served as chief of military justice in Da Nang, Vietnam from 1971 to 1972. He also was a staff lawyer on the Peers' Commission, which investigated the My Lai case.

== Legal work ==
From 1973 to 2002 he worked as an attorney at Robertson, Monagle & Eastaugh Law Firm, a firm he eventually led. For his tireless efforts to keep the capitol in Juneau, the Juneau Chamber of Commerce named him person of the year in 1982. He represented the timber industry in Southeast Alaska and has also been an advocate for public radio and the arts.

== Chief of Staff ==
In 2001, he was named the head of Governor Frank Murkowski's transition team and in 2002, he was appointed chief of staff by Governor Frank Murkowski. Although reluctant to leave the practice of law, which he loved, he said, "I am a strong believer in public service, and it is my turn to serve my State of Alaska, which has given so much back to me and my family." As chief of staff he directed the preparation of the state budget; oversaw the preparation of legislation; negotiated the budget and legislation with the Legislature; worked with the Governor and departmental commissioners to formulate policy.

He also managed the governor's cabinet and served as the state's chief gas pipeline negotiator successfully negotiating a draft contract between the governor and the North Slope producers to construct a gas pipeline. During that time he was often referred to as "the most powerful unelected official in Alaska," although he always rejected the sentiment as he said his job was simply to carry out the will of Governor Murkowski. He said that he was not acting on his own agenda.

== Polar Pen charges dropped ==
In 2008, Clark admitted that he was aware that VECO Corporation had paid $10,000 for a political poll to gauge the popularity of then-incumbent Governor Murkowski, and was charged with honest services fraud. However, the statute was so vague that it gave prosecutors "almost carte blanche power" to use in political and private situations which "should not be criminalized." Shortly thereafter, the U.S. Supreme Court ruled that the honest services fraud statute was drafted with unconstitutional vagueness and could only cover "fraudulent schemes to deprive another of honest services through bribes or kickbacks supplied by a third party who ha[s] not been deceived." Since Clark's awareness of the poll constituted neither bribes or kickbacks, all charges against him were voided.

Moreover, due to misdeeds on behalf of the federal prosecutors in their "Polar Pen" operation, the prosecutors themselves were later investigated and found guilty of gross prosecutorial misconduct in the Ted Stevens case.

== Current activities ==
Clark is working as an attorney in Juneau. According to the Alaska Dispatch, he volunteers and spends time with his grandchildren.
