= Bob Roses =

American politician, teacher, and businessman

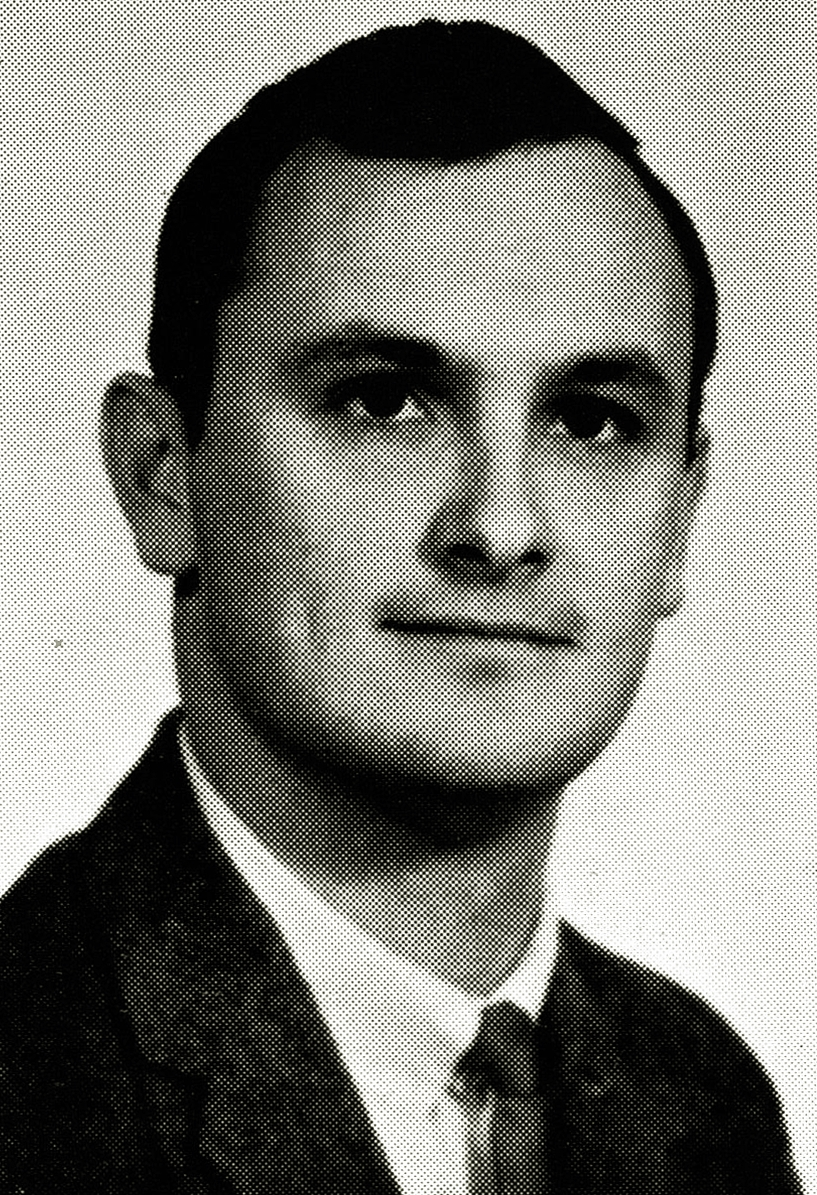
- Bob Roses as a student at Alaska Methodist University in 1968.

Member of the Alaska House of Representatives from the 19th district
- In office January 2007 – January 2009
- Preceded by: Tom Anderson
- Succeeded by: Pete Petersen

Personal details
- Born: May 23, 1947 (age 79) Pensacola, Florida, U.S.
- Party: Republican
- Education: Alaska Methodist University, University of Alaska Anchorage
- Occupation: Teacher, businessman

John Robert Roses (born May 23, 1947) is a retired teacher, businessman and Republican politician in the U.S. state of Alaska. He served a single term as a member of the Alaska House of Representatives, representing the 19th District in northeast Anchorage from 2007 to 2009. Roses was defeated for reelection by Democratic candidate Pete Petersen in November 2008.

== Personal info ==
Roses has lived in the 19th district of Alaska for 47 years. In 1965, Bob and his father moved to Anchorage, Alaska because this was where his father was stationed. The two lived on base.

== Family ==
In 1968, Roses married Bev Jelnek, who was from Anchorage. The two built their own house, moved in, and then raised their family.
