= Bob Buch =

American politician

Member of the Alaska House of Representatives from the 27th district
- In office 2007 – 2011
- Preceded by: Norm Rokeberg
- Succeeded by: Mia Costello

Personal details
- Born: July 24, 1949 (age 76) Fond du Lac, Wisconsin
- Party: Democratic
- Spouse: Marcy
- Occupation: Plumber

Robert L. "Bob" Buch (born July 24, 1949) was a Democratic member of the Alaska House of Representatives, representing the 27th District from 2007 to 2011. He was elected in November 2006 defeating the Republican opponent Tom Moffatt by 56.57% to 43.25%. In 2008, Buch won re-election, defeating the Republican Bob Lewis by 72 votes. Buch was defeated in November 2010 by the Republican Mia Costello.
