= Lindsey Holmes =

American politician (born 1973)

Member of the Alaska House of Representatives from the 26th district
- In office January 15, 2007 – 2014
- Preceded by: Ethan Berkowitz

Personal details
- Born: October 16, 1973 (age 52) Anchorage, Alaska
- Party: Democratic (until 2013); Republican (2013–present)
- Education: Middlebury College; Stanford University; University of Chicago
- Profession: Attorney

Lindsey S. Holmes (born 1973) is a Republican member of the Alaska House of Representatives, representing the 26th District since 2006. She was a registered Democrat until she changed parties and joined the Alaska House Majority Coalition on January 12, 2013. Holmes declined to run for another term in 2014.
