= Andrea Doll =

American politician (born 1940)

Member of the Alaska House of Representatives from the 4th district
- In office January 2007 – January 2009
- Preceded by: Bruce Weyhrauch
- Succeeded by: Cathy Muñoz

Personal details
- Born: August 14, 1940 (age 86) Buffalo, New York, U.S.
- Party: Democratic
- Spouse: Robert
- Children: Larry, Kathleen, Bradford, Ross
- Education: University of California Santa Barbara, San Diego State University, University of Maryland
- Profession: educator, real estate broker

Andrea L. Doll (born August 14, 1940) is a Democratic politician in the U.S. state of Alaska. She served a single term in the Alaska House of Representatives, representing the 4th District from 2007 to 2009.
