= Norm Rokeberg =

American politician

Member of the Alaska House of Representatives from the 27th district
- In office January 20, 2003 – January 16, 2007
- Preceded by: Scott Ogan
- Succeeded by: Bob Buch

Member of the Alaska House of Representatives from the 11th district
- In office January 16, 1995 – January 20, 2003
- Preceded by: Jim Nordlund
- Succeeded by: John Coghill

Personal details
- Born: January 4, 1943 (age 83) Seattle, Washington, U.S.
- Party: Republican
- Education: Willamette University (BA)

Military service
- Allegiance: United States
- Branch/service: United States Army
- Years of service: 1964–1966

H. Norman "Norm" Rokeberg (born January 4, 1943) is an American politician and businessman.

Born in Seattle, Washington, Rokeberg graduated from Anchorage High School in Anchorage, Alaska in 1961. He then served in the United States Army from 1964 to 1966. In 1971, Rokeberg received his bachelor's degree in political science from Willamette University. Rokeberg was in the real estate business in Anchorage, Alaska. From 1995 to 2007, Rokeberg served in the Alaska House of Representatives and was a Republican.
