= Mike Doogan =

American politician

Member of the Alaska House of Representatives from the 25th district
- Incumbent
- Assumed office January 15, 2007
- Preceded by: Eric Croft

Personal details
- Born: June 7, 1948 (age 78) Fairbanks, Alaska
- Party: Democratic
- Education: University of San Francisco, University of Alaska
- Profession: journalist, writer

Mike Doogan is a Democratic member of the Alaska House of Representatives, representing the 25th District since 2006.

He is also the author of the Nik Kane Alaska mystery series, which includes Lost Angel, Capitol Offense, and Skeleton Lake, as well as several nonfiction books about Alaska life.

Doogan was an editor of the Anchorage Daily News from 1985 to 1990, and a columnist for that paper from 1990 to 2004. From 2004 to 2006, he was the Press Secretary, for the Alaska Legislature Democrats. From 2006 to 2012, he was a member of the Alaska House of Representatives.

In March 2009, Doogan exposed the identity of the previously anonymous blogger behind The Mudflats, a blog critical of Alaska Governor Sarah Palin. Doogan's decision to reveal the blogger's identity received widespread criticism in the blogosphere.

== Books published ==
- How to Speak Alaskan (1993)
- Fashion Means Your Fur Hat Is Dead: A Guide to Good Manners and Social Survival in Alaska (1996)
- Our Alaska: Personal Stories about Living in the North (2001) (editor)
- Doogan: The Best of the Newspaper Columnist Alaskans Love To Hate (2003)
- Lost Angel (A Nik Kane Alaska Mystery Book 1) (2006)
- Capitol Offense (A Nik Kane Alaska Mystery Book 2) (2007)
- Skeleton Lake (A Nik Kane Alaska Mystery Book) (2008)
