= Bill Allen (businessman) =

American chief executive (1937–2022)

William James Allen (April 6, 1937 – June 29, 2022) was an American businessman who was the CEO of the Alaska oilfield services company VECO Corporation. VECO was an Alaska-based oil pipeline service and construction company founded by Wayne Veltri (VECO is short for Veltri Co). Bill Allen was born in Socorro, New Mexico, and at the age of 16 left for the oil fields of Alaska to become a welder to help support his family. VECO began as a one-truck welding and repair operation that grew to become a major player in the Alaskan and worldwide oil industries' support services business. He built a for-profit prison in Barbados as well. VECO also was a worldwide player in the oil industry, having divisions in many major oil markets, including Sudan, Russia, Mexico, Venezuela, and Syria. VECO had a major impact on the economy of Alaska and employed over 5,000 people worldwide. Allen was later prosecuted for sexually assaulting minors, a crime he had been protected from prior after lying under oath during Ted Stevens's corruption trial, costing the Senator re-election in 2008.

== Exxon Valdez oil spill ==
On March 24, 1989, the oil tanker Exxon Valdez ran aground on Bligh Reef, spilling eleven million gallons of crude oil into the waters of Prince William Sound. The Exxon Valdez oil spill was the second-largest in United States history, after the BP Gulf of Mexico Deepwater Horizon oil spill.

Under Allen's guidance, VECO (along with its unionized subsidiary, NORCON) was responsible for large parts of the spill's cleanup, hiring 2,500 workers to clean up the environmental disaster.

Following the spill and cleanup, Allen purchased the Anchorage Times from editor/publisher Robert Atwood. Allen operated the newspaper until shutting it down and selling many of its assets to its rival, the Anchorage Daily News, in 1992. Through an agreement described as "unique," Allen paid for space in the editorial section of the ADN for many years afterward to provide a half-page feature known as The Voice of the Times.

== Alaska political investigation ==
On May 7, 2007, Allen, along with VECO's Vice President for Community & Government Affairs Rick Smith, pleaded guilty in U.S. District Court in Anchorage in the Alaska political corruption probe to charges of extortion, bribery, and conspiracy to impede the Internal Revenue Service. The charges involved bribing Alaska lawmakers to vote in favor of an oil tax law favored by the VECO that was the subject of vigorous debate during the regular and two special sessions of the Alaska Legislature in 2006. Bill Allen's testimony, at the trial of his former friend, Alaska Senator Ted Stevens, helped secure Stevens' conviction, in U.S. District Court on charges of felonious corruption. Bill Allen pleaded guilty and could have faced 9–10 years. Instead, he was sentenced to 3 years in prison and fined $750,000.00. He was released from a halfway house in New Mexico on November 22, 2011.

Later, it emerged that Allen might have perjured himself at trial, seemingly due to federal prosecutors promising he could avoid prosecution for paying for underage girls to travel across state lines for sex if he lied about Stevens under oath. During a review of the case triggered by allegations of prosecutorial misconduct, investigators for the United States Department of Justice discovered a previously undocumented interview between Allen and prosecutors. In this interview, Allen stated that the fair market value of the repairs to Stevens' house was around $80,000, far less than the $250,000 he testified to at trial. Moreover, Allen said in the interview that he didn't recall talking to Bob Persons, a friend of Stevens, regarding the repair bill for Stevens' house. This directly contradicted Allen's testimony at trial, where he claimed Stevens had asked him to give Persons a note Stevens had sent asking for a bill for the repair work. At trial, Allen said Persons had told him the note shouldn't be taken seriously because "Ted's just covering his ass". The notes of this interview were never given to the defense, as required by U.S. criminal law. The discovery of this interview was cited by U.S. Attorney General Eric Holder in his decision to move to dismiss Stevens' indictment before sentencing—effectively vacating his conviction. "I have determined that it is in the interest of justice to dismiss the indictment and not proceed with a new trial," said Holder.

== Allen's resignation from VECO ==
On May 11, 2007, the VECO Corporation announced that CEO Bill Allen and Vice President for Community & Government Affairs Rick Smith had resigned from the corporation. Allen was succeeded as chairman of the board by his daughter, Tammy Kerrigan. A new CEO had not been chosen. It was not clear if the position of Vice President for Community & Government Affairs would be refilled.

== Sale of VECO Corporation ==
In September 2007 VECO Corporation was sold to Colorado-based CH2M HILL corporation. Due to the cloud hanging over its head from the political investigation, it is estimated that VECO was forced to sell for far less than its market value. Allen negotiated that 5% of the proceeds from the sale of VECO be given to the employees for the years of service they had given the company. Assets that included the Norcon division yard in Anchorage and other Alaskan and foreign properties were retained by the Allen family.

== Personal ==
Bill Allen had three children, who received $30 million each from the sale of VECO: Kerrigan, Mark Allen, and Shannon West. He owned racehorses, including a partnership in the stud-horse So Long Birdie, which included his son Mark, Stevens, and seven others, and which was managed by Persons. New Mexico veterinarian Leonard Blach and Mark co-owned Mine that Bird, ridden by Calvin Borel, which won the 2009 Kentucky Derby. Going off at 50-1 odds, it was the longest ever odds on a winner of that race. Mark then entered the horse in the second leg of the Triple Crown, the Preakness Stakes. The new owners of Rachel Alexandra, a filly that won the Kentucky Oaks with Borel aboard, intended to enter her in the Preakness as well, with Borel again committed to riding her. Mark attempted to collude with another owner to enter two additional horses, in order to exclude Rachel Alexandra from running by filling the field and to allow him to have Borel ride Mine that Bird again. After the scheme was exposed, Mark declined to enter his second horse. He issued a press release, stating "Additionally, my decision to enter Indy Express in the Preakness was strictly business but after consulting with my Dad (sic) and Doc Blach, I have decided to withdraw Indy Express to prevent any further miss (sic) understandings. They're (sic) advice to me was just to do what's right, because arrogance and greed aren't right." Rachel Alexandra, with Borel riding her, won the 2009 Preakness Stakes with Mine that Bird ridden by Mike Smith, finishing second, a length behind.

Allen died on June 29, 2022, at the age of 85; at the time of his death he lived in Grand Junction, Colorado.
