= Public Integrity Section =

Section of the US Department of Justice

The Public Integrity Section (PIN) is a section of the Criminal Division of the U.S. Department of Justice charged with combating political corruption at all levels of government through the prosecution of corrupt federal, state, and local elected and appointed public officials.

== Role ==
The Public Integrity Section holds exclusive jurisdiction over prosecution of alleged criminal misconduct by federal judges, monitors the investigation and prosecution of election and conflict of interest crimes. It consolidates into one unit the U.S. Department of Justice's oversight responsibilities for prosecuting criminal abuses of the public trust by elected and appointed government officials. In addition to prosecuting cases, PIN also advises and assists prosecutors and agents in the field in handling public corruption cases.

PIN previously employed more than 30 prosecutors who "travel the country to help local United States attorney's offices develop complex and often politically contentious corruption cases".

In 2025, following restructuring by the Trump administration and five resignations stemming from the administration's handling of the Eric Adams corruption case, PIN's headcount was reduced to just two attorneys. In addition to the headcount reduction, the administration also stripped the unit of its abilities to file new cases of its own and consult on cases involving members of Congress.

== Administrative history ==
The Public Integrity Section was created in March 1976 in the wake of the Watergate scandal. Since 1978, it has supervised administration of the Independent Counsel provisions of the Ethics in Government Act of 1978, which requires the Attorney General to report to the United States Congress annually on the operations and activities of the Public Integrity Section. Annual reports to Congress since 1978 are available on the PIN's website. PIN's Election Crimes Branch was created in 1980 and supervises the U.S. Department of Justice's nationwide response to voter fraud, campaign financing offenses, and other election crimes.

== Criticism ==
PIN was originally known for its "elite reputation", but it has fallen under disrepute since its decision to prosecute Senator Ted Stevens (R–Alaska) for failing to disclose gifts. Though he was convicted in 2008 and lost his bid for re-election, in 2009 Attorney General Eric Holder threw out the case after it emerged that PIN prosecutors "failed to turn over evidence that could have helped Mr. Stevens win acquittal".

After this blow to its reputation, it was criticized for "being gun-shy" because it had closed out without pressing charges a "series of long-running investigations into current or former members of Congress," including Senator John Ensign of Nevada and representatives Tom DeLay of Texas, Jerry Lewis of California, Alan Mollohan of West Virginia, and Don Young of Alaska.

== See also ==
- Federal Election Commission
- Honest services fraud
- Jack Abramoff Indian lobbying scandal
- Skilling v. United States (2010)
