= Gene Therriault =

American politician

Member of the Alaska Senate from the Q district
- In office 2001–2009
- Preceded by: Drue Pearce

Personal details
- Born: January 31, 1960 (age 66) Fairbanks, Alaska, U.S.
- Party: Republican
- Spouse: Jo
- Education: University of Alaska Fairbanks

Gene Therriault (born January 31, 1960) is an American politician who served as a member of the Alaska Senate, representing the Q district from 2001 to 2009. He served as the Senate President from 2003–2006 and as Senate Minority Leader from 2007–2008. Previously he was a member of the Alaska House of Representatives from 1992 through 2000.

Alaska House of Representatives
Preceded by District created	Member of the Alaska House of Representatives from the 33rd district 1993–2001	Succeeded by Hugh Fate
Alaska Senate
Preceded by Mike W. Miller	Member of the Alaska Senate from Q district 2001–2003	Succeeded by Thomas Wagoner
Preceded by Ben Stevens	Member of the Alaska Senate from F district 2003–2009	Succeeded by John Coghill
Political offices
Preceded by Rick Halford	President of the Alaska Senate; 2003–2005	Succeeded by Ben Stevens
