= VECO Corporation =

American oil pipeline service company

- Company type: Former private company
- Industry: Energy, chemical, and process industries
- Founded: 1968 in Wilmington, Delaware
- Founder: William J. (Bill) Allen
- Defunct: 2007
- Fate: Acquired by CH2M Hill
- Headquarters: Anchorage, Alaska, USA
- Area served: Worldwide
- Key people: Now a part of CH2M Hill. Former executives included Tammy Kerrigan, Interim CEO; Peter Leathard, president & COO; Roger Chan, EVP & CFO
- Services: Engineering, design/build, construction, project management, procurement, operations and maintenance services
- Owner: CH2M Hill. Formerly owned by Allen Limited Partnership (62%); Tammy Kerrigan Revocable Trust (17%); Leathard Limited Partnership (10%); Roger Chan (6%); Bill Allen (5%)
- Number of employees: 4,000 (2007)
- Subsidiaries: Commonwealth Construction; VECO Construction; Norcon; ECC-VECO; VECO Federal; VECO Gas Technologies, Inc. RTX Inc.
- Website: veco.com

VECO Corporation was an American oil pipeline service and construction company until its purchase in September 2007 by CH2M Hill. As of that date, the VECO Corporation ceased to exist. Founded in 1968 as Veltri Enterprises by Wayne Ray Veltri, renamed VE Construction after being bought in 1970 by Bill Allen and in 1979 changed to VECO Corp. The company grew to become a major player in the Alaskan oil industries' support. VECO also was a worldwide player in the oil industry, having divisions in many major oil markets.

== Exxon Valdez oil spill ==
On March 24, 1989, the oil tanker Exxon Valdez ran aground on Bligh Reef, spilling eleven million gallons of crude oil into the waters of Prince William Sound. The Exxon Valdez oil spill was the largest in United States history.

VECO was responsible for large parts of the spill's clean up, hiring 2,500 workers to clean up the environmental disaster.

== Voice of the Times ==
VECO's Ex CEO, Bill Allen, paid for the publishing of the "Voice of the Times," a half page counterpoint to the Anchorage Daily News which was published within the pages of the latter. The Voice of the Times is what remains of the Anchorage Times, a newspaper which went out of business due to competition from the Anchorage Daily News in 1992.

In accordance with an agreement reached between the former editors of the Anchorage Times and the Anchorage Daily News, space was provided for the Times' editors to provide a counterpoint to the Anchorage Daily News. From 1992 until 2002, the Anchorage Daily News provided this space for free. In 2002 the agreement was renewed for five years, but the "Voice of the Times" was required to pay for the space as though it was advertising.

On May 9, 2007 the Anchorage Daily News announced it would end the arrangement at month's end, and it would cease publishing the Voice of the Times. Although ADN publisher Mike Sexton said the decision had been made a week prior, he was quoted a few days before this announcement as saying the situation was still under review. The Voice of the Times now exists as a blog.

== Alaska Legislature corruption scandal ==
On August 31, 2006 officers with the Federal Bureau of Investigation and the Internal Revenue Service raided the offices of several prominent members of the Alaska Legislature. Raided were the offices of Sen. John Cowdery (R-Anchorage), Senate President Ben Stevens (R-Anchorage), Rep. Vic Kohring (R-Wasilla), Rep. Bev Masek (R-Willow), Rep. Bruce Weyhrauch (R-Juneau), Sen. Don Olson (D-Nome), and Rep. Pete Kott (R-Eagle River). The investigation involved allegations of illegal gifts to law makers from VECO. Senator Olson was never charged but it was found he had turned down illegal campaign assistance.

Sarah Palin is another Alaskan politician that received campaign support from VECO. The International Herald Tribune reported on September 3, 2008, "As Palin campaigned unsuccessfully in 2002 to become lieutenant governor, she received contributions from executives at VECO Corp., a powerful Alaska oil field services company." The questionable donations totaled $4,500, over 10% of all her funding that year. Allen admitted that he had given executives money to be contributed in his "bonus" program though he denied knowing that the laundering was illegal.

Also named in the search warrants were VECO officers Bill J. Allen, Rick Smith and Pete Leathard.

=== VECO executives indicted, plead guilty ===
On May 7, 2007, VECO CEO Bill Allen and Vice President for Community & Government Affairs Rick Smith pleaded guilty in U.S. District Court in Anchorage to charges of extortion, bribery, and conspiracy to impede the Internal Revenue Service.

In addition to the three politicians arraigned on May 4, the new court filings mention illegal payments made to a former state senator, named as "Senator B" in court documents, who received over $200,000 from VECO Corp. over several years, income which Senator B reported as "consulting fees." In the May 7 guilty pleas by Allen and Smith, they admit that the only work done by Senator B in exchange for the funds was advancing VECO's agenda in the state legislature. The only former state senator who matches the information contained in court documents about Senator B is former Senator Ben Stevens (R-Anchorage), son of U.S. Senator Ted Stevens (R-Alaska). To date, Ben Stevens has not been indicted. Another state senator discussed in the court documents who later pleaded guilty, was identified as "Senator A." He was John Cowdery. On 3/12/09 ex-state representative Beverly Masek pleaded guilty to taking $4,000 in bribes from Allen.

=== Allen, Smith resign ===
On May 11, 2007 the VECO Corporation announced that CEO Bill Allen and Vice President for Community & Government Affairs Rick Smith had resigned from the corporation. Allen was succeeded as chairman of the board by his daughter, Tammy Kerrigan.

== Federal bribery investigations ==
On July 24, 2007, The Wall Street Journal reported that Representative Don Young was under federal investigation for possibly taking bribes, illegal gratuities or unreported gifts from VECO. Between 1996 and 2006, Young received $157,000 from VECO employees and its political action committee. In the first half of 2007, Young spent more than $250,000 of campaign contributions for legal fees.

Alaska State House representatives Beverly Masek, Pete Kott, Bruce Weyhrauch and Vic Kohring were all charged with federal crimes as part of the investigation into VECO.

On May 29, 2007, the Anchorage Daily News reported that the FBI and a federal grand jury were investigating an "extensive" remodeling project at Senator Ted Stevens' home in Girdwood, Alaska. The remodeling work, organized by VECO, more than doubled the size of the home (public records show that the home is now 2,471 square feet (229.6 m^{2}) and valued at about $441,000). The repairs could have cost anywhere between $130,000 and 250,000, and the payments Ted Stevens paid were about $160,000. Stevens' Alaska home was raided by the FBI and IRS on July 30, 2007. Stevens was indicted by a federal grand jury on July 29, 2008 on seven counts alleging that Stevens received hundreds of thousands of dollars in gifts that he did not declare on his US Senate financial disclosure forms. Stevens was convicted on all seven of these charges on October 27, 2008. All the convictions were vacated on April 7, 2009 due to gross prosecutorial misconduct.

== CH2M Hill acquisition ==
In May 2007 VECO began negotiations with Colorado-based CH2M Hill to acquire VECO. The deal was finalized in September 2007, with CH2M Hill integrating VECO into its operations.

== See also ==
- List of oilfield service companies
