= Pete Kott =

American politician

Peter Kott

23rd Speaker of the Alaska House of Representatives

Member of the Alaska House of Representatives
- In office 2003–2004
- Preceded by: Brian Porter
- Succeeded by: John Harris

Member of the Alaska House of Representatives from the 17th (previously 24th) district
- In office 1993–2007
- Preceded by: None - District 24 newly created (redistricting)
- Succeeded by: Anna Fairclough

Personal details
- Born: August 29, 1949 (age 77) Flint, Michigan, U.S.
- Party: Republican
- Children: Peter, Pamela
- Education: Florida International University, B.S., Masters Public Administration
- Occupation: Business owner; retired U.S. Air Force captain

Peter Kott (born August 29, 1949) is a former Republican state representative for District 17 serving Eagle River, Alaska, in the Alaska Legislature for seven terms, from 1993 until 2007. He was Speaker of the House during his sixth term in 2003–2004.

On May 4, 2007, Kott was one of three former or current legislators (the others being Bruce Weyhrauch (R-Juneau) and Vic Kohring (R-Wasilla)) arrested and charged with bribery, extortion, and other corruption-related charges involving allegations of soliciting and receiving money and favors from VECO Corporation executives in return for their votes on an oil tax law favored by the VECO. Kott pleaded not guilty to all charges. On September 25, 2007, a federal jury found Kott guilty on three of the four charges brought against him. He was acquitted on the charge of wire fraud. On December 7, 2007, he was sentenced to six years in prison and fined $10,000.

However, he was released on bond in June 2009 while a court reviews the case. The conviction was vacated and in 2011 Kott agreed to plead guilty in exchange for being sentenced to time served and conditions on his release.

== See also ==
- Alaska political corruption probe
- Public Integrity Section
