= Mark Neuman =

American politician (born 1959)

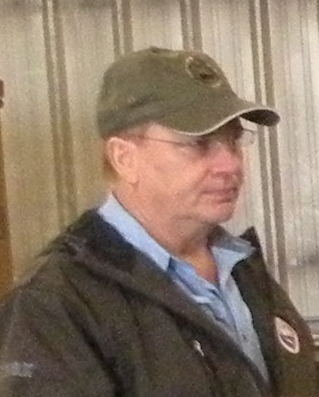

Member of the Alaska House of Representatives from the 15th district
- In office January 10, 2005 – January 11, 2021
- Preceded by: Beverly Masek
- Succeeded by: David Nelson

Personal details
- Born: August 12, 1959 (age 67) Rice Lake, Wisconsin, U.S.
- Party: Republican
- Spouse: Adel
- Education: Matanuska-Susitna College

Mark A. Neuman (born August 12, 1959) was a Republican member of the Alaska House of Representatives, representing the 15th District from 2005 to 2020.

He served as the co-chair of the Resources Committee, vice-chair of the Labor & Commerce Committee as well as the Rules Committee, Economic Development, Trade & Tourism Special Committee, the Cook Inlet Salmon Task Force, and the Legislative Budget & Audit Committee. He was on the Commerce, Community & Economic Development, Corrections, Education & Early Development, and the Natural Resources Finance Subcommittee for the 26th Legislature.

Neuman is a designer and builder of custom fine furniture.

== Personal life ==
Neuman has a wife, Adel and two children. Mark graduated from Rice Lake High School in Rice Lake, Wisconsin northwest of Eau Claire in 1977. He received his certification in Refrigeration, Heating, Ventilation and Air Conditioning from the Matanuska-Susitna College in Palmer, Alaska in 1989.
