= Vic Kohring =

American politician (1958–2022)

Member of the Alaska House of Representatives from the 14th district
- In office January 21, 2003 – July 19, 2007
- Preceded by: Lisa Murkowski
- Succeeded by: Wes Keller

Member of the Alaska House of Representatives from the 26th district
- In office January 17, 1995 – January 21, 2003
- Preceded by: Patrick J. Carney
- Succeeded by: Ethan Berkowitz

Personal details
- Born: August 2, 1958 Waukegan, Illinois, U.S.
- Died: September 6, 2022 (aged 64) North of Palmer, Alaska, U.S.
- Party: Republican; Alaskan Independence (2014)
- Spouse: Tatiana
- Children: Anna
- Education: Alaska Pacific University (1987)

Victor H. Kohring (August 2, 1958 – September 6, 2022) was an American politician who was a member of the Alaska House of Representatives.

== Elections ==
Kohring was elected as a Republican to seven consecutive two-year terms beginning in 1994. Kohring represented Wasilla in District 26 and then District 14, after redistricting due to the 2000 United States census. He resigned on July 19, 2007, during a widespread Alaska political corruption probe.

In 2013, Kohring ran for a seat on the Wasilla City Council. He was defeated by a 2–to-1 margin on October 1, 2013.

In 2014 Kohring was the Alaskan Independence Party candidate for the United States Senate from Alaska. He withdrew from the race in September 2014 and endorsed Republican challenger Dan Sullivan.

== Corruption ==
Kohring was indicted on federal bribery and extortion charges on May 4, 2007. He, along with former state legislators, Republicans Pete Kott and Bruce Weyhrauch, were accused of soliciting and accepting bribes from VECO Corporation, an oil field services company. Their capital and district offices had been among 20 searched by FBI agents on August 31, 2006. Kohring resigned his seat on June 20, 2007.

On November 1, 2007, a federal jury found Kohring guilty in three out of four criminal charges and acquitted on the fourth, a charge of extortion. In May 2008, he was sentenced to three and a half years in prison. Kohring asked outgoing President George W. Bush for a pardon that was not granted.

The conviction was vacated, and in 2011, Kohring agreed to plead guilty in exchange for being sentenced to time served and conditions on his release. Kohring was released on June 11, 2009.

== Death ==
On September 6, 2022, driving alone in a minivan, Kohring crossed the center line of the Glenn Highway near the Fishhook exit, north of Palmer and was killed when he collided head-on with a semi-trailer truck. He was 64 years old. The truck driver was not injured.

Alaska House of Representatives
Preceded by Patrick J. Carney	Member of the Alaska House of Representatives from the 26th district January 17, 1995 – January 21, 2003	Succeeded by Ethan Berkowitz
Preceded by Lisa Murkowski	Member of the Alaska House of Representatives from the 14th district January 21, 2003 – July 19, 2007	Succeeded by Wes Keller
