= Brendan Sullivan (lawyer) =

American lawyer (born 1942)

- Born: March 11, 1942 (age 84); Providence, Rhode Island, U.S.
- Education: Georgetown University (BA, JD)
- Employer: Williams & Connolly

Brendan V. Sullivan Jr. (born March 11, 1942) is an American lawyer who is currently a senior partner in the law firm Williams & Connolly. Sullivan is a white-collar criminal defense attorney best known for his defense of U.S. Marine Lieutenant Colonel Oliver North in the wake of the Iran-Contra scandal in the late 1980s. He is known for his combative style and several prosecutors have been fired, disbarred, or jailed for prosecutorial misconduct Sullivan had uncovered.

He has also represented former U.S. Department of Housing and Urban Development (HUD) Secretary Henry Cisneros, Walter Forbes, former chairman of Cendant Corporation, and a number of states against Microsoft, and the lacrosse players in the Duke lacrosse case.

== Education and military career ==
Sullivan is a graduate of Georgetown University, where he earned his B.A. in 1964 and J.D. in 1967. He served as a captain in the United States Army Transportation Corps from 1968 to 1969. He entered the national spotlight after he helped defend soldiers charged in the Presidio mutiny in San Francisco. Apparently his courtroom tactics "so annoyed his Army superiors" that he was ordered to return to Vietnam for the last six months of his tour but the Secretary of the Army personally blocked the deployment after being pressured by members of Congress to do so.

Afterwards, a Georgetown law professor introduced him to Edward Bennett Williams, a prominent defense attorney. Sullivan joined his law firm, Williams & Connolly, where he "entice[d] his new mentor to visit his office by offering Williams his beloved peanut butter crackers", according to a 2012 interview in The Washingtonian. Williams and Sullivan enjoyed a father-son relationship with "real deep affection".

== Career ==
=== Oliver North ===
Sullivan shot to national prominence in 1987, when he represented Oliver North in televised congressional hearings over the Iran-Contra scandal. During the hearings in front of the Joint House-Senate Iran-Contra Committee, chairman Senator Daniel Inouye suggested that North speak for himself, admonishing Sullivan for constantly objecting to questions posed to North. Sullivan famously responded, "Well, sir, I'm not a potted plant. I'm here as the lawyer. That's my job." Furthermore, apparently he "shouted down a question" that he claimed violated attorney-client privilege: "That's none of your business either!" Sullivan received international media attention as the episode was broadcast on live television, making him "something of a hero to lawyers, even moderates and liberals". The hearing showcased his "confrontational style of 'protecting the client at any cost'" that has proven to be "extremely effective" despite angering several congressmen.

=== Ted Stevens ===
Sullivan's defense of U.S. Senator Ted Stevens has been described as his "most prominent win against the government, and the one that must loom largest for the U.S. Attorney's Office". He was defending Stevens after his federal grand jury indictment on seven counts of failing to properly report gifts. Stevens was convicted of all counts in a trial before D.C. District Court Judge Emmet G. Sullivan, on October 27, 2008, shortly before election day, when he would be narrowly defeated by Mark Begich. Discovery of the prosecution's failure to provide sufficient exculpatory information in response to a Brady motion, led to Attorney General Eric Holder withdrawing the indictment after a reversal of the verdict during the appeal process.

=== Other notable cases ===
He also sued Microsoft, on behalf of nine state attorneys general who were unhappy with the federal government's decision to drop the Microsoft antitrust case. He also represented the four FBI agents involved in the controversial 1992 Ruby Ridge shootout. He defended former Secretary of Housing and Urban Development Henry Cisneros against accusations of making false statements to the FBI during a background check. He is the attorney for billionaire chipmaker Henry Nicholas, the founder of Broadcom, who was charged with violating securities and narcotics law in June 2008.

Sullivan represented three of the Duke lacrosse players accused of raping a stripper in the 2006 Duke lacrosse case. The prosecutor, Mike Nifong, served a day in jail for contempt of court and was disbarred because he did not disclose DNA evidence to the defense that would have weakened his case; Sullivan's clients, and all others accused were declared "innocent" by then North Carolina Attorney General Roy Cooper. Additionally, he successfully defended New York Stock Exchange CEO Dick Grasso who was sued by the Attorney General of New York Eliot Spitzer in 2004.

== Style ==
In 2012, Sullivan explained to PBS interviewers during an investigation of overzealous prosecution that "the heat of battle" was responsible for leading honest and upstanding prosecutors to forget prosecutorial ethics. He said that they "see almost everyone they deal with as a law violator", something he calls the "Al Capone mentality". In a 2011 commencement speech at Georgetown University, Sullivan urged the graduates to "be on the lookout for injustice" for both the poor and the wealthy.

Some of his best-known quotations include:

- "I'm not a potted plant. I'm here as the lawyer. That's my job."
- "Internet Explorer, your honor, is the fruit of Microsoft's statutory violations and it should be denied them."
- "Tapes, as we all know, are very powerful evidence. Tapes that are altered are powerfully misleading."
- "The fate of no citizen should rest on the testimony of such a man so richly rewarded."
- "Dismiss it!″

In 2000, he received the Golden Plate Award of the American Academy of Achievement.

He is a fellow in the American College of Trial Lawyers, and was awarded an honorary Doctor of Law by Georgetown University Law Center in 2011.

== In popular culture ==
Minneapolis band Beat the Clock has a song on their 1992 Funk Bus album called "Brendan V.", about Sullivan's role in the Oliver North trial.

== Publications ==
- 1985, White Collar Criminal Practice Grand Jury, Litigation and Administrative Practice Series (Criminal Law Course Handbook No. 137)
- 1983, Techniques for Dealing with Pending Criminal Charges or Criminal Investigations, Litigation and Administrative Practice Series (Criminal Law Course Handbook Series No. 130)
- 1981 Grand Jury Proceedings, Litigation and Administrative Practice (Criminal Law Course Handbook Series No. 121)
