= Point Possession, Alaska =

Point Possession, Alaska Tuyqun
- Census-designated place
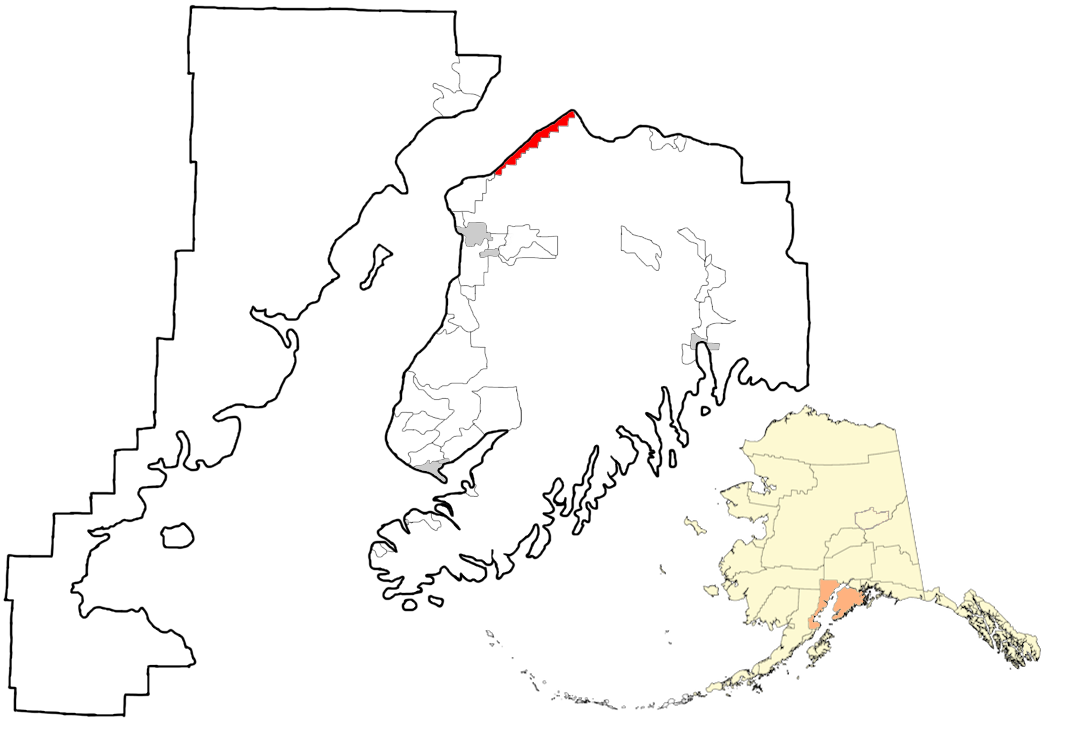
- Location in Kenai Peninsula Borough, Alaska
- Coordinates: 60.9230807°N 150.688844°W
- Country: United States
- State: Alaska
- Borough: Kenai Peninsula

Government
  - Borough mayor: Peter Micciche
  - State senator: Jesse Bjorkman (R)
  - State rep.: Ben Carpenter (R)

Area
  - Total: 41.97 sq mi (108.71 km^{2})
  - Land: 41.97 sq mi (108.71 km^{2})
  - Water: 0 sq mi (0.00 km^{2})

Dimensions
  - Length: 27 mi (43 km)
  - Width: 1 mi (1.6 km)
- Elevation: 100 ft (30 m)

Population (2020)
  - Total: 9
  - Density: 0.21/sq mi (0.08/km^{2})
- FIPS code: 02-61825

Point Possession (Dena'ina: Tuyqun or Ch'aghałnikt) is a census-designated place (CDP) on the Kenai Peninsula in Alaska. According to the 2020 census, the CDP population was 9. Since 2009, Point Possession has been owned by the federal government and has been made a part of the Kenai National Wildlife Refuge.

== Geography ==
The CDP is named for Point Possession, a landform on the northwest side of the Kenai Peninsula that marks the southern side of the mouth of Turnagain Arm into Cook Inlet. The CDP extends from the point 27 miles (43 km) southwest along the shore of Cook Inlet to the mouth of the Swanson River, across which is the CDP of Nikiski. The Kenai Spur Highway enters the Point Possession CDP at the Swanson River and shortly dead-ends while still within the Captain Cook State Recreation Area; it leads southwest 27 miles (43 km) to the city of Kenai. The rest of the CDP is accessible only via four-wheel-drive roads.

According to the U.S. Census Bureau, the Point Possession CDP has an area of 42.0 square miles (108.7 km^{2}), all of which is recorded as land. While the permanent population is three, the 2010 census counted 214 housing units.

== Demographics ==
Historical population
Census	Pop.	Note	%±
2010	3		—
2020	9		200.0%
U.S. Decennial Census
