= Alaska Senate district D =

Alaskan legislative district

Alaska's D State Senate district
Senator
| Jesse Bjorkman; R–Nikiski |
since 2023
- Population: 36,936

Alaska Senate district D is one of 20 districts of the Alaska Senate. It has been represented by Republican Jesse Bjorkman since 2023. District D is located in the Kenai Peninsula and encompasses the entirety of Alaska's 7th House of Representatives district and 8th House of Representatives district, including Kenai and Soldotna.

From 2013 to 2022, the district covered a portion of the Matanuska-Susitna Valley - this area is now encompassed by district N and district O.

== Election results (2022 boundaries) ==
=== 2024 ===
Nonpartisan primary
| Party | Candidate | Votes | % |
|---|---|---|---|
| Coalition Republican | Jesse Bjorkman (incumbent) | 2,924 | 44.3 |
| Republican | Ben Carpenter | 2,660 | 40.3 |
| Democratic | Tina Wegener | 845 | 12.8 |
| Independence | Andy Cizek (withdrew) | 172 | 2.6 |
| Total votes | | 6,601 | 100.0 |

General election
| Party | Candidate | First choice | | | Round 1 | | | Round 2 | |
| Party | Candidate | Votes | % | Transfer | Votes | % | Transfer | Votes | % |
|---|---|---|---|---|---|---|---|---|---|
| Coalition Republican | Jesse Bjorkman | 9,234 | 47.82% | +23 | 9,257 | 47.92% | +545 | 9,802 | 54.71% |
| Republican | Ben Carpenter | 7,848 | 40.64% | +17 | 7,865 | 40.71% | +249 | 8,114 | 45.29% |
| Democratic | Tina Wegener | 2,182 | 11.30% | +14 | 2,196 | 11.37% | -2,196 | Eliminated | |
| Write-in | | 47 | 0.24% | -47 | Eliminated | | | | |
| Total votes | | 19,311 | | | 19,318 | | | 17,916 | |
| Blank or inactive ballots | | | | | 820 | | +1,402 | 2,222 | |
| Republican hold | | | | | | | | | |
| Coalition hold | | | | | | | | | |

=== 2022 ===
Nonpartisan primary
| Party | Candidate | Votes | % |
|---|---|---|---|
| Republican | Tuckerman Babcock | 5,157 | 49.3 |
| Republican | Jesse Bjorkman | 3,754 | 35.9 |
| Independent | Andy Cizek | 1,543 | 14.8 |
| Total votes | | 10,454 | 100.00 |

General election
| Party | Candidate | First choice | | | Round 1 | | | Round 2 | |
| Party | Candidate | Votes | % | Transfer | Votes | % | Transfer | Votes | % |
|---|---|---|---|---|---|---|---|---|---|
| Republican | Jesse Bjorkman | 6,950 | 45.82 | +122 | 7,072 | 46.56 | +532 | 7,604 | 53.56 |
| Republican | Tuckerman Babcock | 6,311 | 41.60 | +20 | 6,331 | 41.68 | +263 | 6,594 | 46.44 |
| Independent | Andy Cizek | 1,768 | 11.66 | +19 | 1,787 | 11.76 | -1,787 | Eliminated | |
| Write-in | | 140 | 0.92 | -140 | Eliminated | | | | |
| Total votes | | 15,169 | | | 15,190 | | | 14,198 | |
| Blank or inactive ballots | | | | | 1,046 | | +992 | 2,038 | |
| Republican hold | | | | | | | | | |

== Election results (2013 boundaries) ==
Map of District D of the Alaska Senate from 2013 to 2022

=== 2020 ===
Republican primary
| Party | Candidate | Votes | % |
|---|---|---|---|
| Republican | David S. Wilson (incumbent) | 1,734 | 33.9 |
| Republican | Stephen Wright | 1,325 | 25.9 |
| Republican | Loy "Santa" Thurman | 1,134 | 22.2 |
| Republican | Bee Rupright | 469 | 9.2 |
| Republican | Chandra McCain-Finch | 340 | 6.7 |
| Republican | Huhnkie Lee | 110 | 2.2 |
| Total votes | | 5,112 | 100.0 |

Democratic primary
| Party | Candidate | Votes | % |
|---|---|---|---|
| Independent | Thomas Lamb | 1,329 | 100.0 |
| Total votes | | 1,329 | 100.0 |

General election
| Party | Candidate | Votes | % |
|---|---|---|---|
| Republican | David S. Wilson (incumbent) | 12,600 | 69.2 |
| Nonpartisan | James D. "Dan" Mayfield | 2,618 | 14.4 |
| Democratic | Thomas Lamb | 2,613 | 14.3 |
| Write-in | Write-ins | 386 | 2.1 |
| Total votes | | 18,217 | 100.0 |
| Republican hold | | | |

=== 2016 ===
Republican primary
| Party | Candidate | Votes | % |
|---|---|---|---|
| Republican | David S. Wilson | 1,748 | 51.78 |
| Republican | Lynn Gattis | 1,628 | 51.78 |
| Total votes | | 3,376 | 100 |

General election
| Party | Candidate | Votes | % |
|---|---|---|---|
| Republican | David S. Wilson | 11,689 | 96.44 |
| Write-ins | Write-ins | 431 | 3.56 |
| Total votes | | 12,120 | 100 |
| Republican hold | | | |

== Election results (2012 boundaries) ==
Map of District D of the Alaska Senate from 2012 to 2013

=== 2012 ===
Republican primary
| Party | Candidate | Votes | % |
|---|---|---|---|
| Republican | Mike Dunleavy | 2,802 | 57.42 |
| Republican | Linda Menard (incumbent) | 2,078 | 42.58 |
| Total votes | | 4,880 | 100 |

General election
| Party | Candidate | Votes | % |
|---|---|---|---|
| Republican | Mike Dunleavy | 11,724 | 94.24 |
| Write-ins | Write-ins | 716 | 5.76 |
| Total votes | | 12,440 | 100 |
| Republican hold | | | |
