= Stormy Lake (Alaska) =

Lake in the state of Alaska, United States

- Three Bay Lake
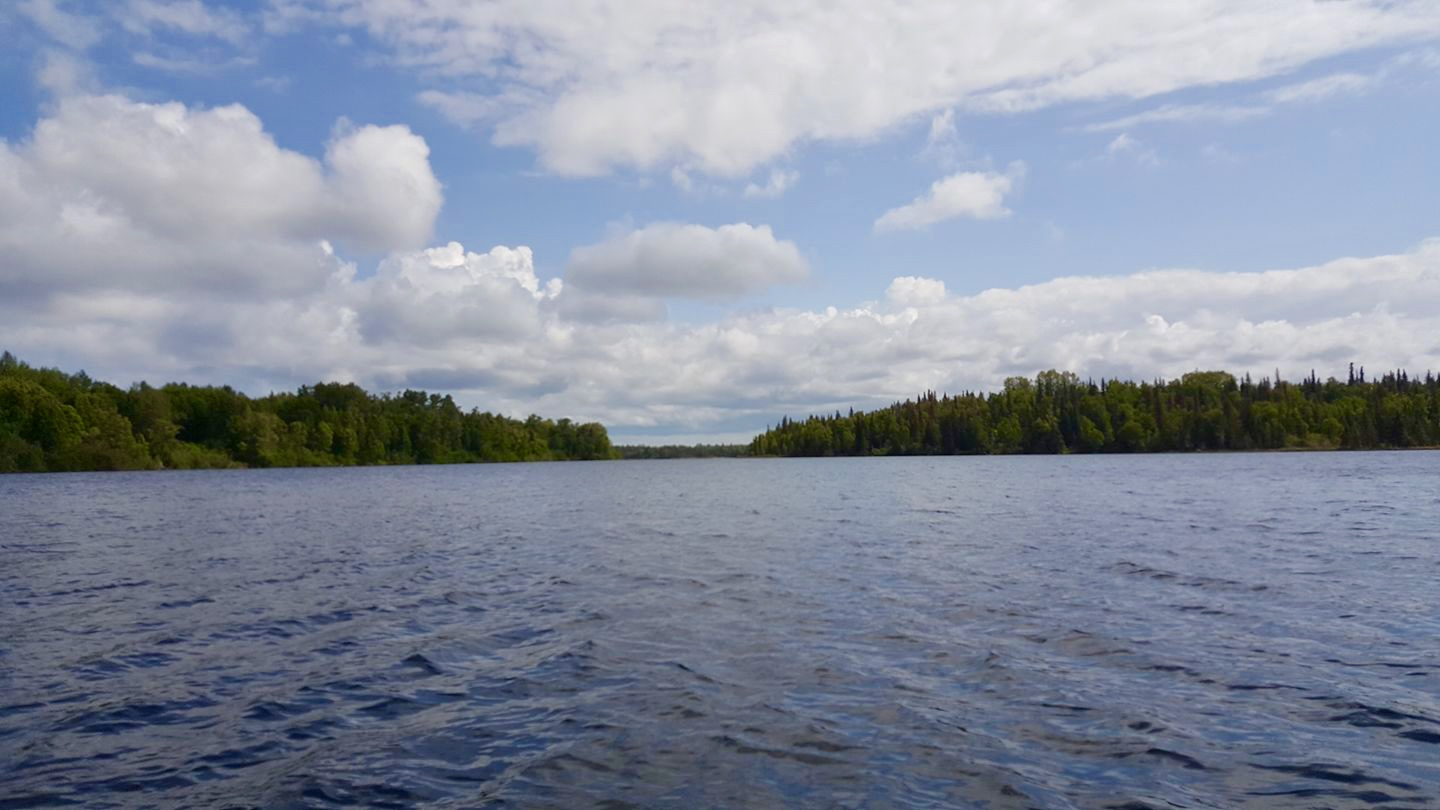
- View of the lake showing the channel connecting the different sides of the lake

- Location within Alaska Location within North America
- Location: Kenai Peninsula Borough
- Coordinates: 60°46′51″N 151°03′09″W
- Type: Lake
- Primary inflows: Several small streams
- Primary outflows: Small creek that drains into the Swanson River
- Basin countries: United States
- Managing agency: Alaska Department of Natural Resources, Alaska Department of Fish and Game
- Surface area: 161.9 hectares (400 acres)
- Max. depth: 15.2 metres (50 ft)
- Surface elevation: 100 feet (30 m)
- Frozen: Early winter to late spring

Stormy Lake is a lake on the Kenai Peninsula of Alaska, also known as Three Bay Lake. It is located 27 miles (43 km) north of the town of Kenai. The lake has been the target of two efforts to eradicate invasive species and re-introduce native flora and fish.

== Name and location ==
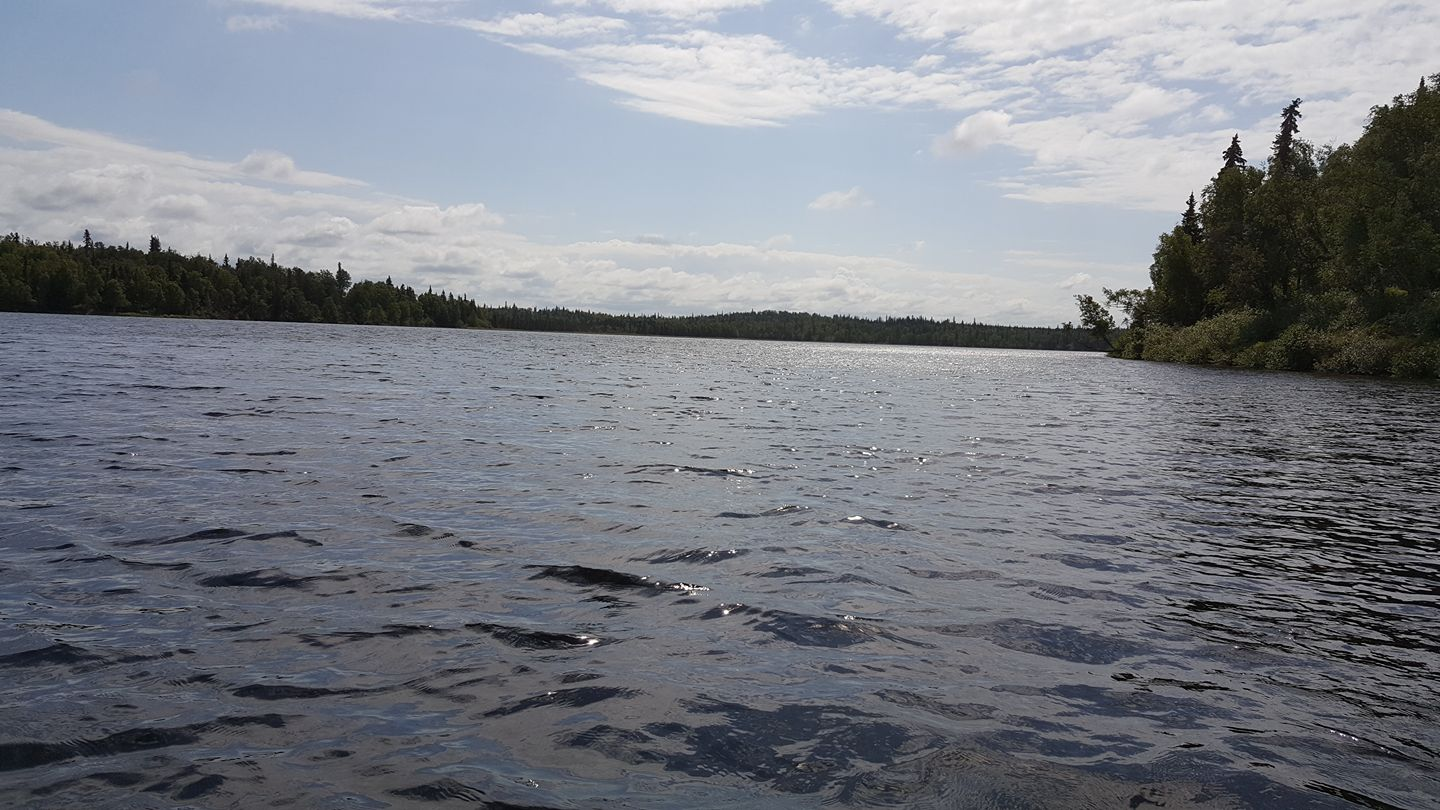
One of the three "bays" of the lake

Stormy Lake is a lake on the Kenai Peninsula. It is located within the Captain Cook State Recreation Area. The prevailing winds can sometimes produce whitecaps on the lake, giving it its name. It is also known as Three Bay Lake because it consists of three nearly separate areas connected by channels.

Access to the lake is via the Kenai Spur Highway, about 27 miles (43 km) north of Kenai. Facilities include a boat launch, overlook, picnic area, wading/swimming area, and a small, boat-in only campground.

== Ecology ==
The area around the lake consists of low hills and swampy areas. In a 1966 survey, the vegetation cover was predominantly spruce, birch, and alder. Several small streams flow into the lake, and the outflow from it eventually drains into the Swanson River. The lake freezes over in the winter.

=== Invasive species ===
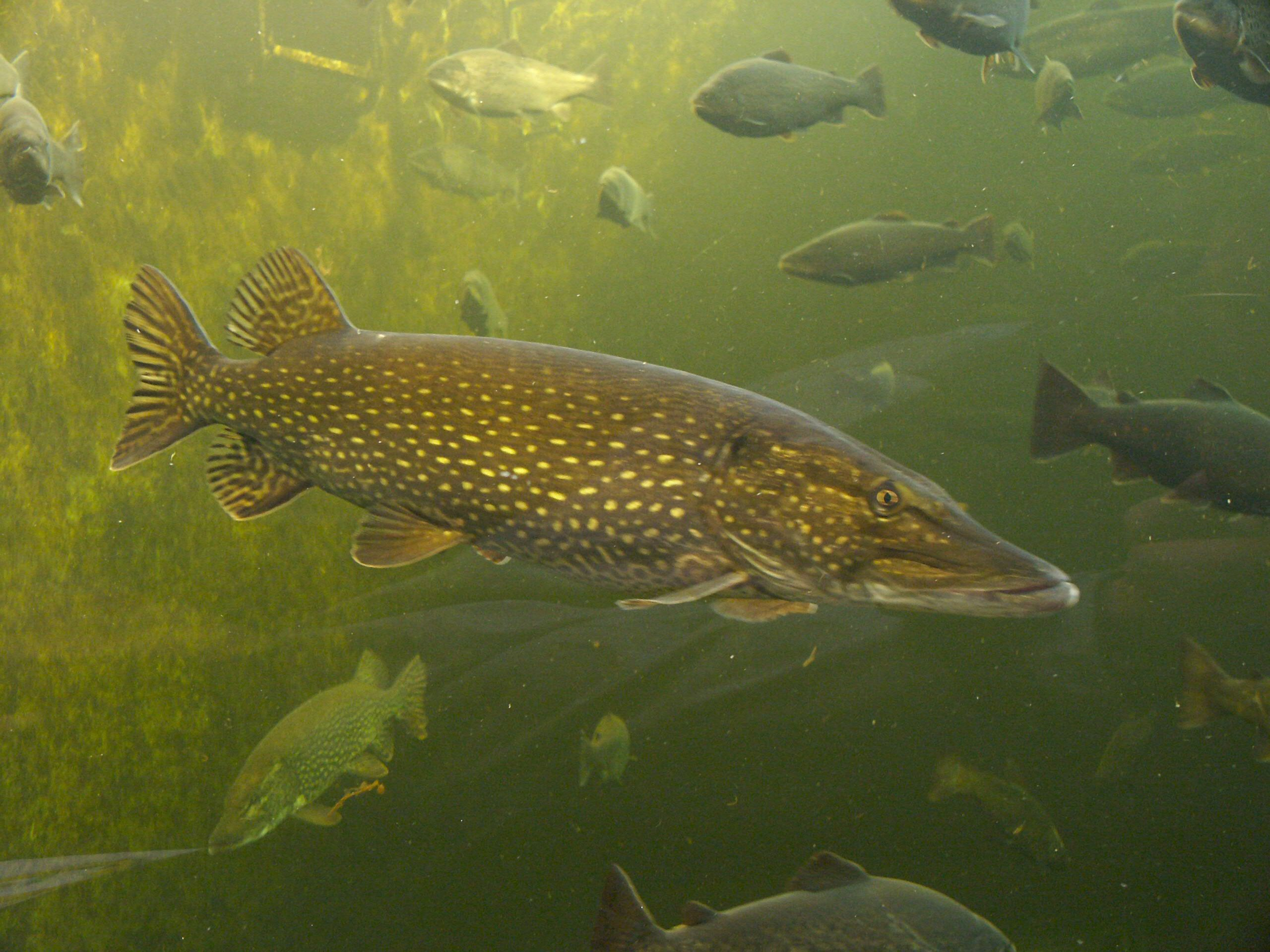
Northern pike had destroyed native fish populations in several bodies of water in the area.

Stormy Lake has been the site of two separate efforts to remove invasive species. In 2012 the lake was closed to the public and the Alaska Department of Fish and Game introduced rotenone, a piscicide, to eliminate highly aggressive northern pike that had apparently been illegally introduced to the lake and were decimating the native fish population. Although the pike are a native species in some parts of Alaska, they are not native to the Kenai Peninsula. The only way to remove them entirely was deemed to be to poison the entire lake and then re-introduce native species. Some native fish were rescued by harvesting their eggs and taking them to fish hatcheries before the treatment began, but it is believed that coho salmon would be able to re-populate the lake on their own due to their migratory nature.

Several boats were used to deploy the rotenone, with additional personnel walking the lake edge with sprayer backpacks to ensure it reached the shallower waters not easily navigated by boats. A drip station dispensing potassium, which neutralizes rotenone, was installed at the lake's outlet to prevent contaminating other water bodies downstream.

Elodea, an invasive plant, was also discovered in the lake during the treatment in 2012. A multiagency task force was created to deal with this issue and monitor lake conditions. The lake was treated with fluridone, which affects plants but not fish, in order to remove the elodea.

The lake remained closed for several years in order to give the re-introduced population of Dolly Varden trout and Stormy Lake's rescued population of genetically distinct arctic char time to grow and begin spawning naturally in the lake, as well as making certain that the Elodea infestation had been completely removed and could not spread to other nearby bodies of water such as the Swanson River.
