= George Floyd protests in Alaska =

2020 civil unrest after the murder of George Floyd

- Part of George Floyd protests
- Date: May 28 – June 6, 2020 (1 week and 2 days)
- Location: Alaska, United States
- Caused by: Police brutality; Institutional racism against African Americans; Reaction to the murder of George Floyd; Economic, racial and social inequality

Cities in Alaska that held a protest with approximately 100 or more participants

This is a list of George Floyd protests in Alaska, United States. Protests occurred in at least thirteen various communities in the state.

== Locations ==
=== Anchorage ===
Two peaceful demonstrations were held on May 30. A march, organized by a high school student via Instagram, began at Town Square. About a hundred protesters marched for about 45 minutes while chanting and holding signs. A rally, organized separately and attended by hundreds of people, took place in midtown where pastors and community activists spoke in solidarity for justice.

=== Bethel ===
On June 2, a crowd of over 100 residents gathered at the Bethel Cultural Center and peacefully protested the murder of George Floyd. Protesters marched, carried signs and chanted, "I can't breathe" in support of the Black Lives Matter Movement.

=== Fairbanks ===
On May 30, over 400 peaceful protesters took part in a rally and march from Veteran's Memorial Park to Golden Heart Plaza organized by the Fairbanks NAACP and the statewide group Native Movement.

=== Haines ===
On June 2, an event drew approximately 200 people, where a moment of silence lasting eight minutes and 46 seconds was held, among other activities.

=== Homer ===
More than 80 people attended a gathering on June 1 and 40 additional people on the next day. One young mother, whose children were in attendance, held a sign that read "Mama", one of Floyd's last words. The event was held at Wisdom, Knowledge, Faith & Love Park on Pioneer Avenue.

=== Juneau ===
On May 30, people held signs decrying violence against black people and calling out institutional racism, many supporting the Black Lives Matter movement. June 6: Hundreds of vocal protesters gathered in Marine Park for a Black Lives Matter rally followed by a march to Douglas Bridge to drop flowers in the water.

=== Ketchikan ===
Protesters demonstrated at the corner of Tongass Avenue and Jefferson Street on June 3.

=== Kodiak ===
In Kodiak on June 4, dozens of people gathered, carrying signs and showing support for George Floyd and the Black Lives Matter movement.

=== Kotzebue ===
At least 20 people marched through Kotzebue on June 2.

=== Nome ===
150 people gathered for a protest across from town hall on June 10.

=== Palmer ===
1,400 people peacefully gathered and marched in the town's historic downtown on June 6 with a call to end racism and to protest the murder of George Floyd.

=== Sitka ===
Around 250 local residents gathered in Totem Square on June 1, the attendees shared in a seven-minute moment of silence and two traditional Tlingit songs of peace.

=== Soldotna ===
On June 3, around 50 people gathered at Soldotna Creek Park and marched to the intersection at Sterling Highway and Kenai Spur Highway to demand justice for George Floyd.

=== Utqiaġvik ===
People met at the whale bone arch near the Top of the World Hotel in Utqiaġvik on June 6 to protest the murder of Floyd and police brutality. Protesters raised their fists in solidarity and observed a moment of silence for eight minutes. One of the organizers also expressed hope for police reform, including demilitarizing the police and banning the use of chokeholds such as the knee-on-neck choke.
