= Senator Menard =

Senator Menard may refer to:

- Joan Menard (born 1935), Massachusetts State Senate
- Linda Menard (born 1943), Alaska State Senate
