= Captain Cook State Recreation Area =

Park in Alaska, United States

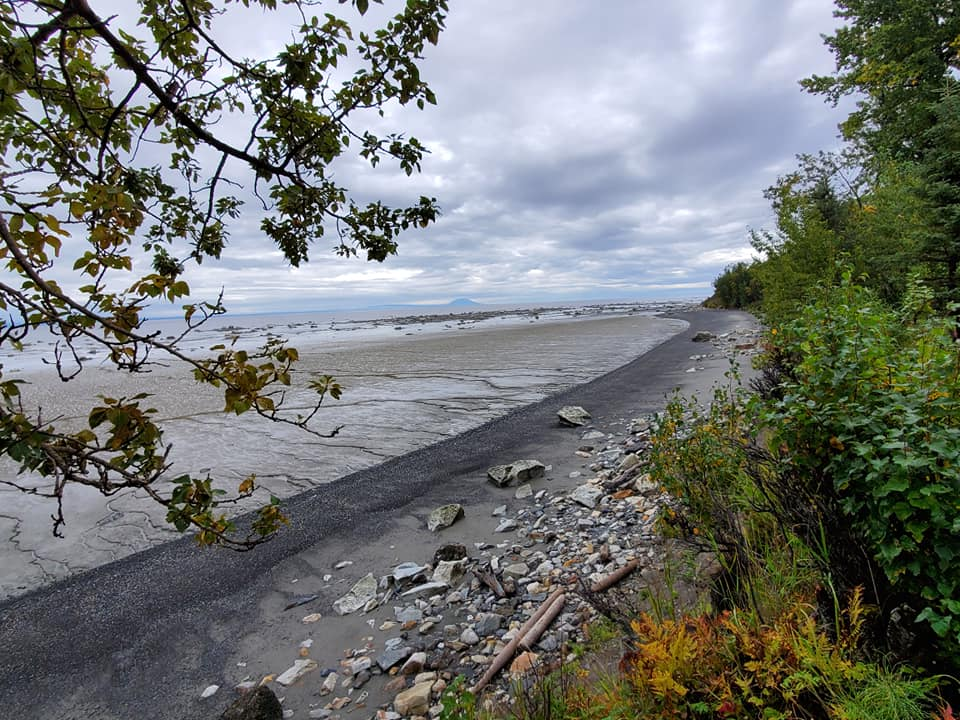
- View from the bluff of a rocky portion of the beach, and the mudflats that can be seen at low tide. Mount Spurr is visible in the distance.

- Location within Alaska
- Nearest city: Nikiski
- Coordinates: 60°48′19″N 151°00′54″W
- Area: 3,466 acres (1,403 ha)
- Authorized: 1971
- Governing body: Alaska Department of Natural Resources

Captain Cook State Recreation Area is a park on the Kenai Peninsula in Alaska. It is located on the shores of Cook Inlet at the northern terminus of the Kenai Spur Highway, about 25 miles (40 km) north of Kenai and 14 miles (23 km) north of Nikiski. Both the Inlet and the recreation area are named after Captain James Cook who explored the area in 1778.

== History ==
Archeological evidence, as well as Cook's observations indicate the area was previously inhabited by the Dena'ina people, who gathered salmon in the area. The beaches in and around the park have also been the site of commercial fishing activity. The park is one of the oldest in the Alaska State Park system, having been authorized in 1971, with major capital improvement projects in 1978 and 2010.

== Features ==
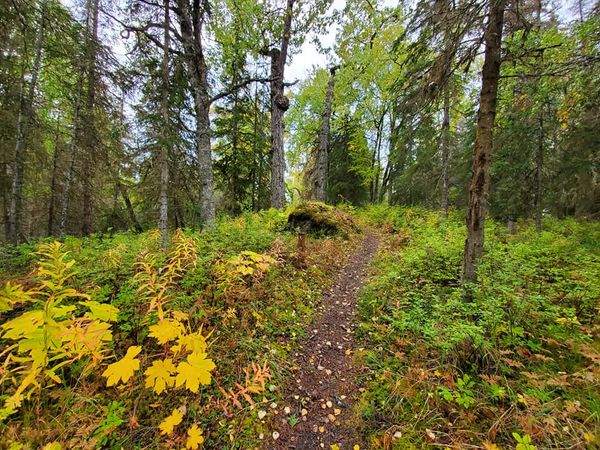
A portion of the nature trail in autumn

One of the park's main features is the Discovery Campground, a 53-site wooded camping area on the bluffs above Cook Inlet (Discovery was the name of one of the ships in Cook's expedition.) Campers are advised to keep a clean camp as black bears are known to frequent the area. There is a nature trail which encircles the campground.

Below the campground is a beach on Cook Inlet, rocky in some places but more sandy near the river outlet. Beachcombers can find agates here. At low tide extensive and dangerous mud flats are exposed below the beach. On a clear day visitors to the bluff and beach can see the distant Aleutian Range, including the volcano Mount Spurr as well as several offshore oil rigs.

The park is the northern terminus of the Swanson River and its associated canoe trail.

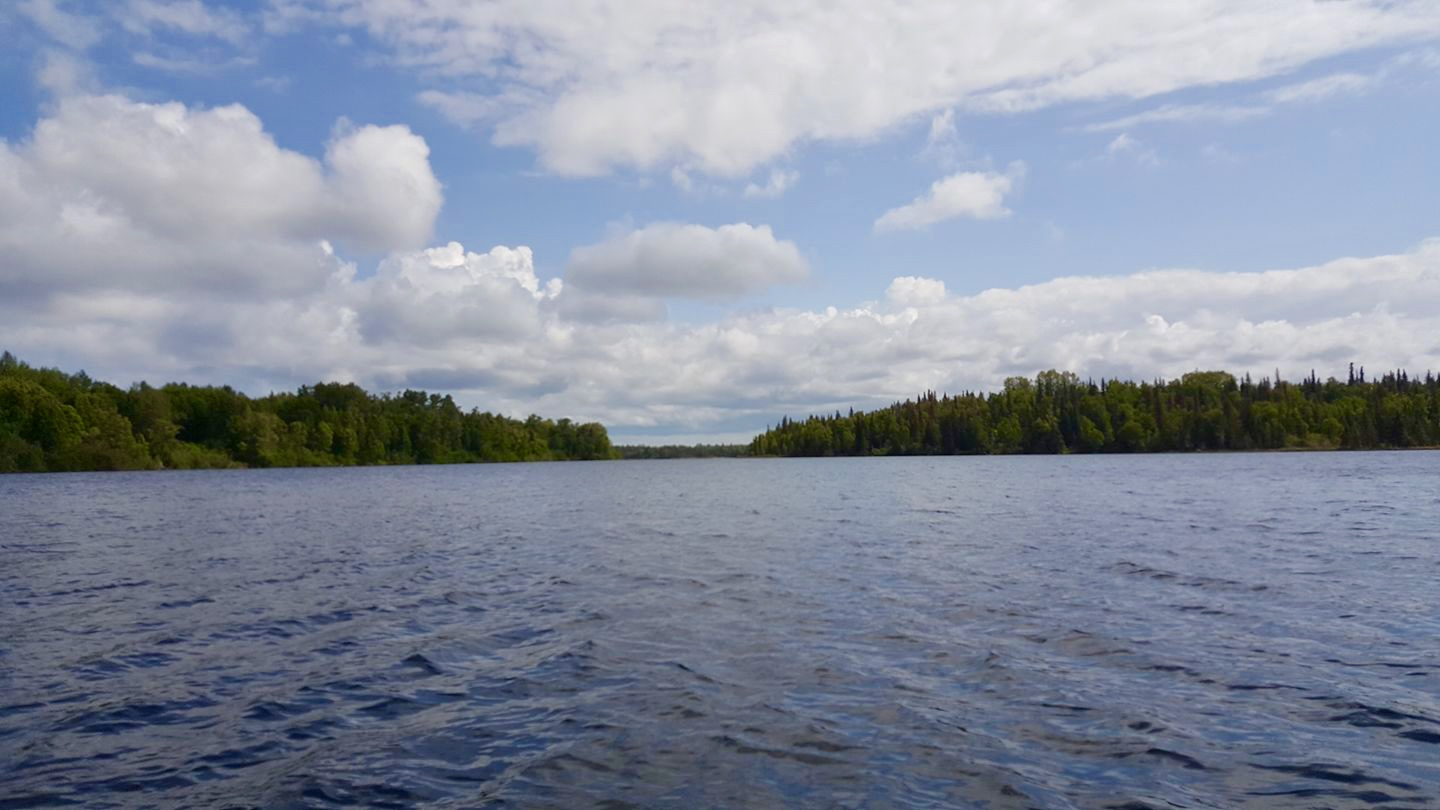
Stormy Lake

The park is also home to Stormy Lake, a 161.9-hectare (400-acre) lake with boat launch and picnic areas as well as a small, primitive, boat-accessible campground. The lake was the site of two efforts to eradicate invasive species.

In winter months the park features ice fishing on the lake and cross-country ski trails.
