= Tuckerman Babcock =

American politician

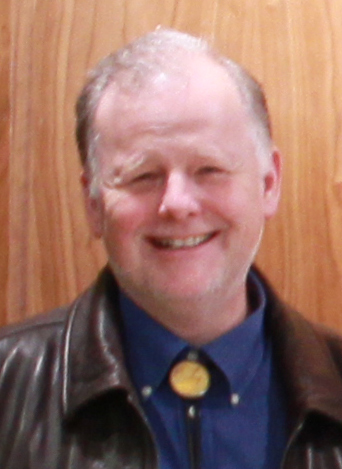

Chief of Staff to the Governor of Alaska
- In office December 3, 2018 – July 31, 2019
- Governor: Mike Dunleavy
- Preceded by: Scott Kendall
- Succeeded by: Ben Stevens

Chair of the Alaska Republican Party
- In office April 30, 2016 – November 8, 2018
- Preceded by: Peter Goldberg
- Succeeded by: Glenn Clary

Personal details
- Born: October 24, 1960 (age 65) Venezuela
- Political party: Republican
- Spouse(s): Kimberly Waychoff (div. 2005); Kristie Babcock
- Children: 8
- Relatives: Lyda Green (mother-in-law); Ralph Samuels (brother-in-law)
- Education: Wesleyan University (BA); College of William and Mary

Tuckerman Babcock (born October 24, 1960) is a political strategist who served as chairman of the Alaska Republican Party from 2016 to 2018.

== Early life and education ==
Babcock has been living in Alaska since 1966. In 1983 he received a Bachelor of Arts degree in Government from Wesleyan University. In 1986, he attended the College of William and Mary.

== Career ==
As executive director of the Governor's Reapportionment Board, Babcock oversaw the redistricting of the Alaska legislature during the 1991-1992 cycle. He then worked as special assistant of constituent relations and director of Boards and Commissions for Governor Wally Hickel. Babcock was a Commissioner at the Alaska Oil and Gas Conservation Commission between 1993 and 1996.

Together with Co-Chairman Frank Murkowski, Babcock managed the Dole presidential campaign in 1996. He was also part of the State Leadership Team for the presidential campaign of Steve Forbes in 1996 and 2000. In 1997, he worked in the staff of his later mother-in-law, State Senator Lyda Green and advised Sarah Palin in all of her campaigns between 1996 and 2008. However, the relationship between them stalled after Palin became a national public figure. Twenty minutes after Governor Dunleavy took office, Babcock fired state elections attorney Libby Bakalar. She sued for wrongful discharge and was awarded $350,000. The Alaska American Civil Liberties Union sued for unlawful firing of employees. Babcock left his position without prior notice in 2019. In 2022, federal Judge John Sedgwick found in favor of the terminated employees, though he ruled that Babcock could not be held personally liable for damages in the action. Between 1999 -2009, Babcock was the Manager of Government and Strategic Affairs at the Matanuska Electric Association (MEA), and later was its Director of Human Resources as well as Assistant Manager. The MEA board of directors ordered General Manager Wayne Carmody to fire Babcock "without cause." His tenure had been marked by substantially increased litigation costs, anti-union issues and discomfiture amongst employees.

Babcock has served as precinct officer and district chairman of Alaska Republican Party. He also was state vice chairman and also briefly served as the party's chairman in the year 2000. In 2016, he again ran for this office. During the Alaska Republican Party convention in Fairbanks April 28–30, 2016, Babcock ran against Fairbanks trial attorney Ann Brown to succeed Peter Goldberg. Babcock won the election and also became a delegate for the 2016 Republican National Convention in Cleveland in the summer of 2016.

In the situation concerning three state Representatives who ran on the Republican ticket but afterwards joined in a centrist coalition with Alaska Democrats, thereby creating a bipartisan majority in the State House, he sent a critical open letter to the three lawmakers. He also supported an attempt of the Alaska GOP to block those three Representatives from running again in the primaries of the Republican party.

Babcock ran in the 2022 election for Seat D in the Alaska State Senate. In the ranked-choice primary first round he led Republican coalition member Jesse Bjorkman but Bjorkman took the seat after votes for third place, nonpartisan candidate Andy Cizek were redistributed.

== Political positions ==
Regarding the decision of Senator Murkowski and Senator Dan Sullivan of Alaska to vote against the abolition of the Affordable Health Care Act (ACA) and its replacement by the GOP substitute, the American Health Care Act of 2017, Babcock stated that he was dismayed. He reminded Murkowski and Sullivan in a letter, that the American people were promised by Republicans, on non-negotiable terms, that the ACA would be repealed.

== Personal life ==
Babcock was divorced from Kimberly Waychoff in 2005. He later married Kristie Babcock, the daughter of former Alaska State Senate President Lyda Green. Kristi owns a State Farm Insurance agency in Kenai. He has eight children and became a full-time parent after he was fired from MEA. The family lives on the Kenai Peninsula.

Party political offices
| Preceded by Peter Goldberg | Chair of the Alaska Republican Party; 2016–2018 | Succeeded by Glenn Clary |
