= Nikiski, Alaska =

- Census-designated place
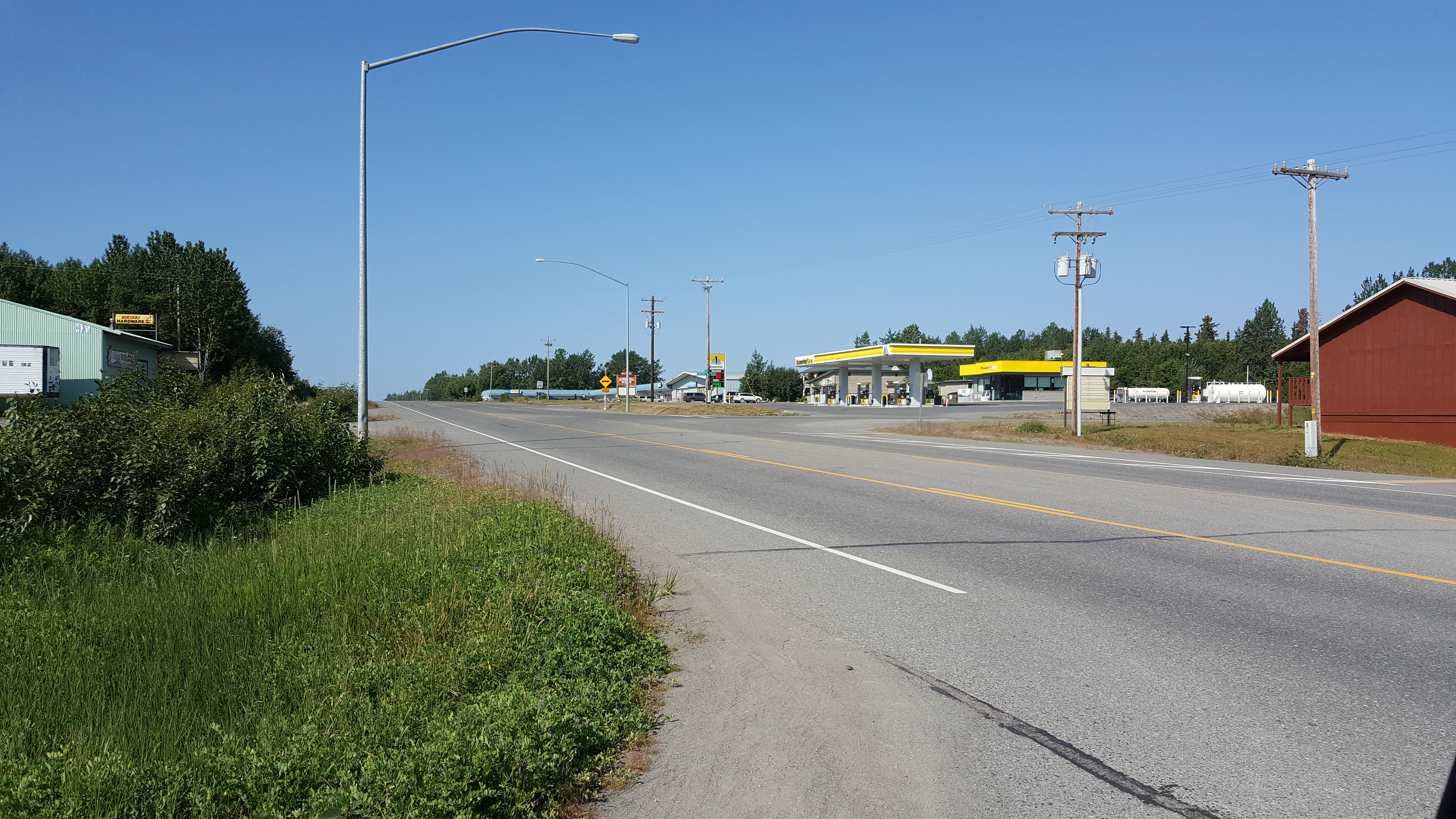

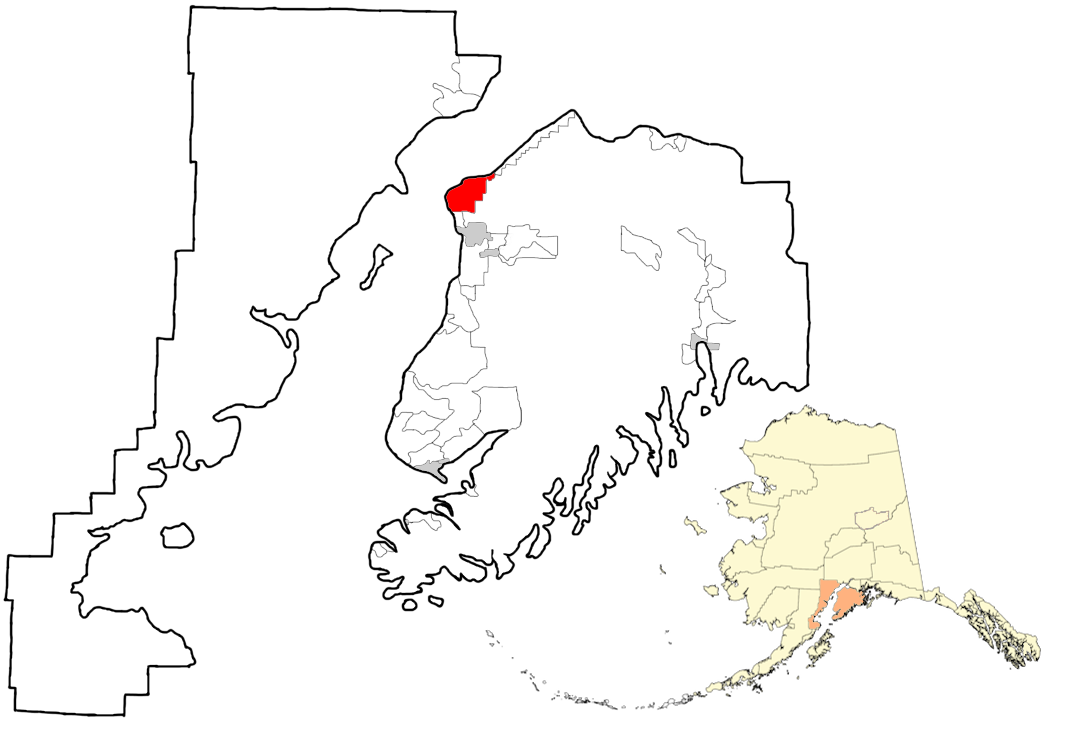
- Location in Kenai Peninsula Borough, Alaska
- Coordinates: 60°42′28″N 151°15′46″W
- Country: United States
- State: Alaska
- Borough: Kenai Peninsula

Government
  - Borough mayor: Peter Micciche
  - State senator: Jesse Bjorkman (R)
  - State rep.: Ben Carpenter (R)

Area
  - Total: 75.93 sq mi (196.65 km^{2})
  - Land: 69.48 sq mi (179.94 km^{2})
  - Water: 6.45 sq mi (16.71 km^{2})
- Elevation: 128 ft (39 m)

Population (2020)
  - Total: 4,456
  - Density: 64.1/sq mi (24.76/km^{2})
- Time zone: UTC-9 (Alaska (AKST))
  - Summer (DST): UTC-8 (AKDT)
- ZIP code: 99635
- Area code: 907
- FIPS code: 02-54050
- GNIS feature ID: 1416651

Nikiski is a census-designated place (CDP) in Kenai Peninsula Borough, Alaska, United States. The population was 4,456 at the 2020 census, down from 4,493 in 2010.

== Geography ==
Nikiski is located at 60°42′28″N 151°15′46″W (60.707891, -151.262646) on the west side of the Kenai Peninsula. It lies along the shore of Cook Inlet between Salamatof to the south and the Swanson River to the northeast. It is bordered across the Swanson River by the Point Possession CDP.

According to the United States Census Bureau, the Nikiski CDP has a total area of 75.9 square miles (196.7 km^{2}), of which 69.4 square miles (179.8 km^{2}) are land and 6.5 square miles (16.8 km^{2}), or 8.57%, are water. The CDP is in a low-lying region covered by several lakes, including Stormy Lake, Suneva Lake, Daniels Lake, Timberlost Lake, Island Lake, Foreland Lake, Bernice Lake, and Cabin Lake.

The main road access is via the Kenai Spur Highway, which leads south 11 miles (18 km) to the city of Kenai and north to Captain Cook State Recreation Area. A second road, the Nikiski Emergency Escape Route, also leads south to the City of Kenai.

== Demographics ==
Historical population
Census	Pop.	Note	%±
1880	74		—
1980	1,109		—
1990	2,743		147.3%
2000	4,327		57.7%
2010	4,493		3.8%
2020	4,456		−0.8%
U.S. Decennial Census

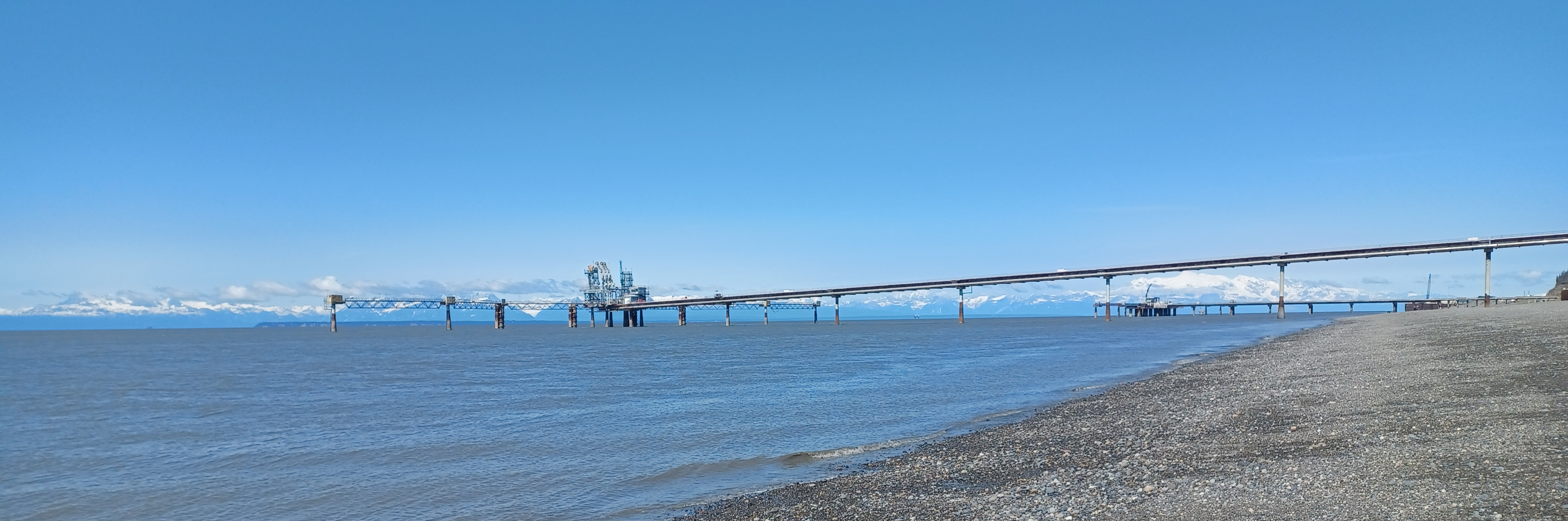
Piers extending into Cook Inlet from in-use and vacant industrial facilities

Nikiski first appeared on the 1880 U.S. Census as the unincorporated Tinneh villages of "Kultuk" (AKA Nikishka No. 3) and "Titukilsk and Nikishka". Kultuk had a population of 17, and Titukilsk and Nikishka had a population of 57, all of whom were Tinneh Natives. There apparently were no census reports from 1880 until 1980, when the area was organized as "Nikishka" and made a census-designated place (CDP). The name was altered to "Nikiski" in 1990 and has reported as such on each successive census.

=== 2020 census ===
As of the 2020 census, Nikiski had a population of 4,456. The median age was 42.7 years. 24.5% of residents were under the age of 18 and 18.3% of residents were 65 years of age or older. For every 100 females there were 111.5 males, and for every 100 females age 18 and over there were 108.1 males age 18 and over.

0.0% of residents lived in urban areas, while 100.0% lived in rural areas.

There were 1,724 households in Nikiski, of which 28.2% had children under the age of 18 living in them. Of all households, 54.2% were married-couple households, 21.0% were households with a male householder and no spouse or partner present, and 16.8% were households with a female householder and no spouse or partner present. About 25.4% of all households were made up of individuals and 11.0% had someone living alone who was 65 years of age or older.

There were 2,063 housing units, of which 16.4% were vacant. The homeowner vacancy rate was 1.0% and the rental vacancy rate was 10.4%.

Racial composition as of the 2020 census
Race	Number	Percent
White	3,458	77.6%
Black or African American	18	0.4%
American Indian and Alaska Native	323	7.2%
Asian	56	1.3%
Native Hawaiian and Other Pacific Islander	13	0.3%
Some other race	78	1.8%
Two or more races	510	11.4%
Hispanic or Latino (of any race)	150	3.4%

=== 2000 census ===
As of the census of 2000, there were 4,327 people, 1,514 households, and 1,130 families residing in the CDP. The population density was 62.2 inhabitants per square mile (24.0/km^{2}). There were 1,766 housing units at an average density of 25.4 per square mile (9.8/km^{2}). The racial makeup of the CDP was 87.2% White, 0.1% Black or African American, 7.6% Native American, 0.7% Asian, 0.5% Pacific Islander, 0.8% from other races, and 3.1% from two or more races. 1.3% of the population were Hispanic or Latino of any race.

There were 1,514 households, out of which 41.7% had children under the age of 18 living with them, 60.9% were married couples living together, 7.9% had a female householder with no husband present, and 25.3% were non-families. 20.8% of all households were made up of individuals, and 3.8% had someone living alone who was 65 years of age or older. The average household size was 2.86 and the average family size was 3.31.

In the CDP, the population was spread out, with 33.5% under the age of 18, 6.3% from 18 to 24, 29.8% from 25 to 44, 24.5% from 45 to 64, and 5.9% who were 65 years of age or older. The median age was 34 years. For every 100 females, there were 109.0 males. For every 100 females age 18 and over, there were 111.3 males.

The median income for a household in the CDP was $51,176, and the median income for a family was $55,969. Males had a median income of $50,673 versus $26,779 for females. The per capita income for the CDP was $20,128. About 9.3% of families and 11.4% of the population were below the poverty line, including 13.0% of those under age 18 and 7.5% of those age 65 or over.

== History ==
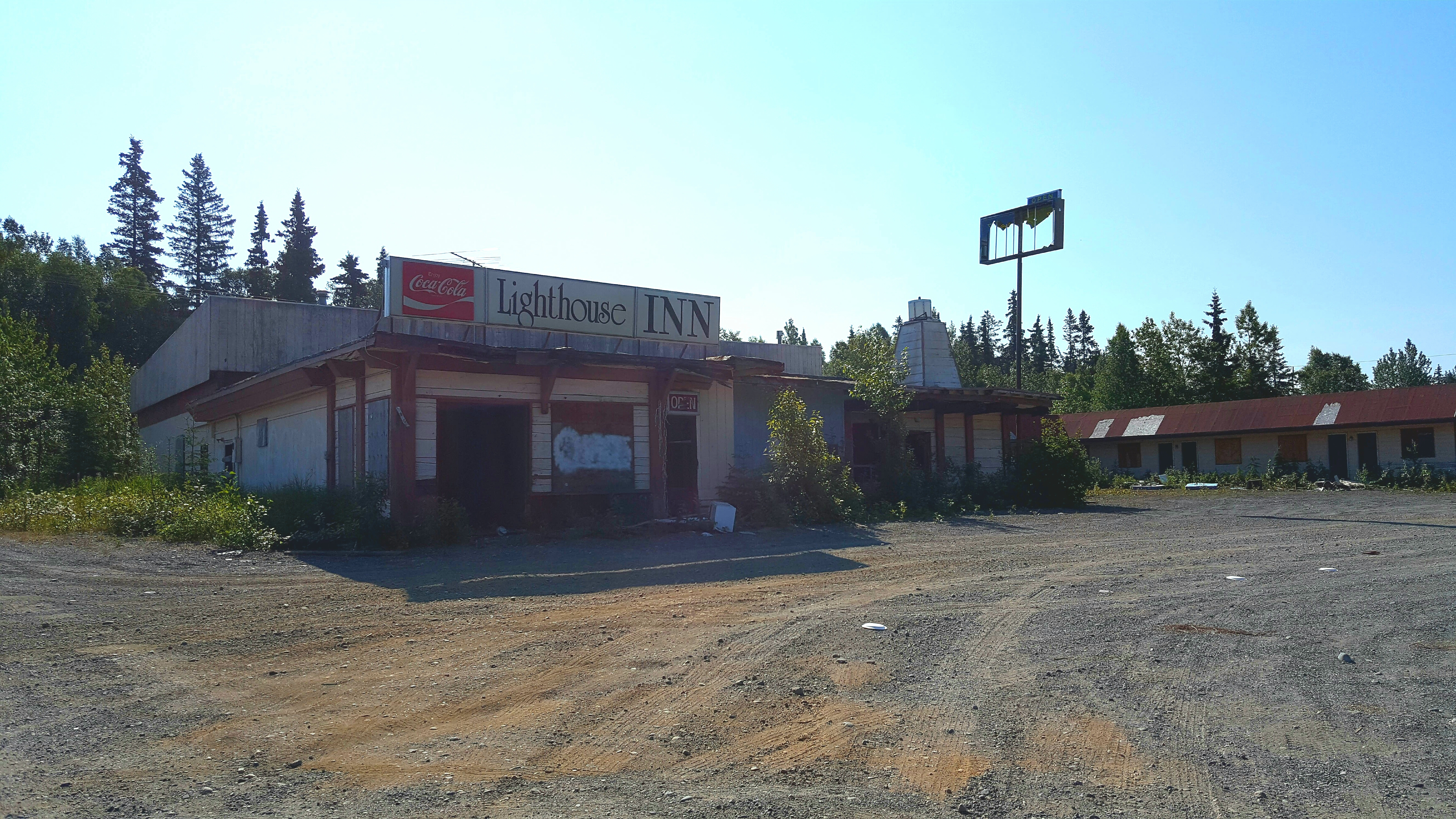
A motel from the area's boom days, now abandoned

Nikiski was once home to an Agrium fertilizer plant, which was once the Kenai Peninsula Borough's largest employer. The facility closed in 2008 due to natural gas shortages, but the company continues to explore reopening it.

== Notable people ==
- Mike Chenault, longest-serving speaker of the Alaska House of Representatives
- Mike Navarre, politician
- Norman Olson, owner of two private militias

== See also ==
- Nikiski High School
