= Marmot Day =

Holiday

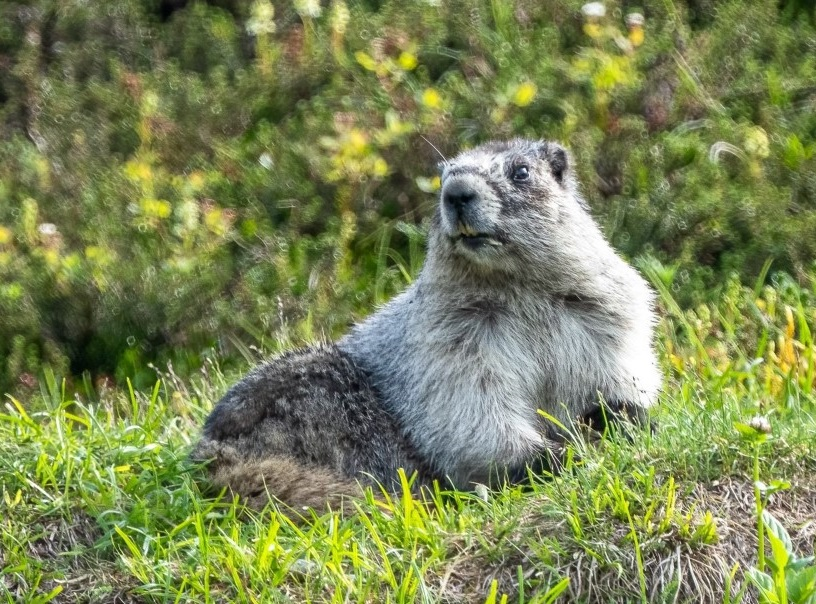
An Alaskan marmot, Kenai National Wildlife Refuge

Marmot Day is an Alaska holiday established to celebrate marmots and Alaska culture. Although local festivals have been part and parcel of frontier life for decades, Marmot Day became an official holiday on April 18, 2009, when the 26th Alaska State Legislature officially passed Senate Bill 58. Marmot Day is celebrated on February 2, replacing Groundhog Day with a holiday honoring Alaska's marmots. From Juneau to Anchorage to Fairbanks, and all the cities in between, Marmot Day has become an Alaska institution.

== Alaskan Senate Bill ==
Senate Bill 58, sponsored by Sen. Linda Menard, R-Wasilla, was first introduced by the late Dr. Curtis Menard, Linda Menard's husband and former state legislator. Concerned by the gradual decline of Alaska's folk values, Dr. Menard proposed his idea of creating Marmot Day in the 1990s. After getting stuck in a committee, the controversial Marmot Day bill died in the legislature. Sen. Linda Menard reintroduced the bill for the 26th Alaska Legislature, and the bill passed on the second to last day of the legislative session, and Sarah Palin signed it into law. As Senator Menard said, "By recognizing the marmot, our state is building a tradition and legacy to be built on for future generations."

== Distinguished from Marmot Day in Owosso, Michigan ==
Marmot Day is also the name of a community celebration in Owosso, Michigan, occurring on July 25 (or on the following Monday if the 25th falls on a weekend). It is a celebration of all marmots, which include groundhogs, woodchucks, and ground squirrels.

Marmot Day was first celebrated in 2002 as a day celebrating all marmots. A luncheon is traditional as part of the celebration, marmot jokes and ginger snaps are shared, among other festivities typical of party celebrations. In recent years the celebration has been held at the Covenant Eyes global headquarters in Shiawassee County. At 12:45 p.m., a marmot is positioned outside its hole, and if it goes into its hole, legend has it that summer is over; if it does not go into its hole, there will be one more month of summer.
