= Lyda Green =

American politician (1938–2023)

Member of the Alaska State Senate
- In office January 21, 2003 – January 19, 2009
- Preceded by: Jalmar M. Kerttula
- Succeeded by: Linda Menard
- Constituency: N district (1995–2003); G district (2003–2009)

Personal details
- Born: Lyda Nell Handley; October 16, 1938 Livingston, Texas, U.S.
- Died: December 19, 2023 (aged 85) Soldotna, Alaska, U.S.
- Party: Republican
- Spouse: Curtis
- Children: 3
- Education: Sam Houston State University, University of Alaska
- Profession: Educator, business owner

Lyda Nell Green (née Handley; October 16, 1938 – December 19, 2023) was an American educator and Republican politician in the U.S. state of Alaska. Green, as a political newcomer, was elected to the Alaska Senate in 1994, defeating a 22-year Democratic incumbent in a district representing most of the population of the Matanuska-Susitna Borough. Two Democratic members of the Alaska House of Representatives, also from the Matanuska-Susitna Valley, were defeated in the same election. Green served a total of fourteen years in the Senate and was its president in her final two years in office.

== Political career ==
Lyda Green was a member of the Alaska Senate, serving from 1995 to 2009. She was first elected in 1994 by defeating Democratic incumbent Jalmar M. "Jay" Kerttula, who was the longest-serving member in the history of the Alaska Legislature. Kerttula was long regarded as vulnerable, and was re-elected in 1984 with under 52% of the vote just as the Matanuska-Susitna Borough was starting to trend Republican. He was twice re-elected after that against veteran campaigners. Given the political atmosphere at the time, Green benefited from being a first-time candidate running against an incumbent who had been in office for over 30 years.

Green was elected the Senate President in 2007 when six Republicans split from their colleagues to form a ruling coalition with all nine Democrats in the Senate. Senator Green decided not to run for reelection in 2008 and was replaced by Republican Senator Linda Menard, whose husband Curtis had served in the Senate several years before Green.

== Relationship with Sarah Palin ==
Green was critical of Alaskan Governor Sarah Palin. When US Senator John McCain of Arizona nominated Palin to be his vice presidential running mate in the 2008 US presidential election, Green said:

She's not prepared to be governor. How can she be prepared to be vice president or president? Look at what she's done to this state. What would she do to the nation?

The statement was made in the context of an oil tax increase Palin supported, as well as a $500 million state subsidy to a Canadian firm for a natural gas pipeline project, even though the pipeline was not guaranteed.

== Personal life ==
Green graduated from Brazosport High School in 1956 and received a B.B.A. degree from Sam Houston State University in 1959.

Lyda Green was married to Curtis Green, who is an agent for State Farm Insurance and was previously a district manager for State Farm in Alaska. Curtis Green has also been a long-time political ally of Dick Randolph. They had three children; their daughter, Kristie, married Tuckerman Babcock, a state official and former chairman of the Alaska Republican Party.

Green died at a hospital in Soldotna, Alaska, on December 19, 2023, at the age of 85.

Political offices
Preceded by Ben Stevens	President of the Alaska Senate; 2007–2009	Succeeded by Gary Stevens
