= Jesse Bjorkman =

American politician

Member of the Alaska Senate from the D district
- Incumbent
- Assumed office January 17, 2023
- Preceded by: Peter Micciche

Personal details
- Born: 1983 or 1984 (age 42–43) Iron Mountain, Michigan, U.S.
- Party: Republican
- Other political affiliations: Alaskan Coalition (2023–2027)
- Spouse: Jamie
- Children: 2
- Education: Michigan State University (BA)

Jesse J. Bjorkman (born 1983/1984) is an American politician. He is a Republican member of the Alaska Senate, representing District D since his election in 2022. Bjorkman represents the northern Kenai Peninsula including Kenai, Soldotna, Nikiski, and Sterling. He is the chair of the Senate Labor and Commerce Committee.

Bjorkman is a former Kenai Peninsula Borough Assembly Member and government teacher at Nikiski High School.

== Early life and education ==
Bjorkman was born in Iron Mountain, Michigan, and earned a Bachelor of Arts in interdisciplinary studies from Michigan State University.

== Personal life ==
Bjorkman has resided in Nikiski, Alaska, since 2010 and previously in Kenai from 2009 to 2010. He is married to his wife Jamie and has two children.

== Electoral history ==
=== 2022 ===
2022 Alaska Senate District D Nonpartisan primary
Party	Candidate	Votes	%
Republican	Tuckerman Babcock	5,157	49.3
Republican	Jesse Bjorkman	3,754	35.9
Independent	Andy Cizek	1,543	14.8
Total votes		10,454	100.00

2022 Alaska Senate District D General election
Party	Candidate	First choice			Round 1			Round 2	
Party	Candidate	Votes	%	Transfer	Votes	%	Transfer	Votes	%
Republican	Jesse Bjorkman	6,950	45.8	+122	7,072	46.6	+532	7,604	53.6
Republican	Tuckerman Babcock	6,311	41.6	+20	6,331	41.7	+263	6,594	46.4
Independent	Andy Cizek	1,768	11.7	+19	1,787	11.8	-1,787	Eliminated	
Write-in		140	0.9	-140	Eliminated				
Total votes		15,169			15,190			14,198	
Blank or inactive ballots					1,046		+992	2,038	
Republican hold									

=== 2024 ===
2024 Alaska Senate District D Nonpartisan primary
Party	Candidate	Votes	%
Coalition Republican	Jesse Bjorkman (incumbent)	2,924	44.3
Republican	Ben Carpenter	2,660	40.3
Democratic	Tina Wegener	845	12.8
Independence	Andy Cizek (withdrew)	172	2.6
Total votes		6,601	100.0

2024 Alaska Senate General election
Party	Candidate	First choice			Round 1			Round 2	
Party	Candidate	Votes	%	Transfer	Votes	%	Transfer	Votes	%
Coalition Republican	Jesse Bjorkman	9,234	47.82%	+23	9,257	47.92%	+545	9,802	54.71%
Republican	Ben Carpenter	7,848	40.64%	+17	7,865	40.71%	+249	8,114	45.29%
Democratic	Tina Wegener	2,182	11.3%	+14	2,196	11.37%	-2,196	Eliminated	
Write-in		47	0.24%	-47	Eliminated				
Total votes		19,311			19,318			17,916	
Blank or inactive ballots					820		+1,402	2,222	
Republican hold									
Coalition hold									
