= Swanson River =

- Location of the mouth of the Swanson River in Alaska
- Etymology: 'Good (Land) River'
- Native name: Yaghetnu (Tswana)

Location
- Country: United States
- State: Alaska
- Borough: Kenai Peninsula

Physical characteristics
- Source: Gene Lake
  - location: Kenai National Wildlife Refuge
  - coordinates: 60°50′46″N 150°29′04″W
  - elevation: 224 ft (68 m)
- Mouth: Number Three Bay on Cook Inlet
  - location: Kenai Peninsula, 19 miles (31 km) northeast of Kenai
  - coordinates: 60°48′01″N 151°01′23″W
  - elevation: 16 ft (4.9 m)
- Length: 40 mi (64 km)

The Swanson River (Dena'ina: Yaghetnu) is a stream, 40 miles (64 km) long, on the Kenai Peninsula of south-central Alaska in the United States. Beginning at Gene Lake in the Swanson Lakes district, it flows southwest then north to Number Three Bay on the Gompertz Channel of Cook Inlet.

The majority of the river's course lies within the Kenai National Wildlife Refuge. In its lower reaches, it passes through the Swanson River Oil Field east of Nikiski before turning sharply north. Near its mouth, it flows through Captain Cook State Recreation Area and under Kenai North Road to enter Cook Inlet.

== Recreation ==
Swanson River and the many lakes around it are popular places for trips in light canoes, and kayaks. Two canoe trails involve lakes and streams rated Class I (easy) on the International Scale of River Difficulty. The Swan Lake Route of 60 miles (97 km) includes 30 lakes with portages of up to 0.5 miles (0.80 km). The Swanson River Route, 46 miles (74 km) long, crosses 40 lakes and requires portages of up to a mile. The portages, which may cross swampy ground, vary from easy to difficult. In addition to boggy terrain, hazards include wind-driven waves, mosquitoes, and a dearth of good campsites.

It is possible to float the Swanson River itself from the outlet at Gene Lake to the North Kenai Road bridge. A shorter float goes 19 miles (31 km) by river from Gene Lake to Swanson River Landing near Swan Lake Road and the Rainbow Lake Campground.

The Swanson system of lakes and streams supports large populations of game fish. The main species are silver salmon, rainbow trout, and Arctic char and Dolly Varden.

== See also ==
- List of rivers of Alaska
