= Ben Carpenter =

American politician

Member of the Alaska House of Representatives
- In office January 16, 2019 – January 21, 2025
- Preceded by: Mike Chenault
- Succeeded by: Bill Elam
- Constituency: 29th district (2019–2023); 8th district (2023–2025)

Personal details
- Born: ca. 1975 (age 50–51) Omak, Washington, U.S.
- Party: Republican
- Occupation: Peony farmer
- Website: Official website

Benjamin E. Carpenter (born ca. 1975) is a former Republican member of the Alaska Legislature representing the State's 8th House district. Carpenter won in the general election on November 6, 2018, and took office on January 16, 2019.

== Life ==
Carpenter graduated from Nikiski High School in 1993. After graduation, he joined the United States Army, serving in Iraq, Afghanistan, and in Turkey and Kuwait with the United States Air Force.

Afterward, Carpenter joined the Alaska Army National Guard, in which he was a special staff officer in the commanding general's office. He later retired from the National Guard. Carpenter grows peonies and was president of the Alaska Peony Market Cooperative.

Carpenter lives in Nikiski, Alaska, with his wife.

== Career in office ==
In 2018, Carpenter won election against independent candidate Shawn Butler by a significant margin, winning a 68.8% majority, despite his opponent raising and spending a much larger amount of campaign funds.

Carpenter is a member of the Alaska House Finance Committee.

In 2022 Representative Ben Carpenter staunchly opposed and voted against (Senate Bill) SB131 that was to provide additional cancer protections to firefighters in Alaska.

In 2019 Carpenter introduced a bill to stop the state of Alaska from reimbursing local municipalities for school bond debt, effectively reducing state funding of public schools by $139 million.

In March 2020, Carpenter joined other Republicans of the Alaska House in unsuccessfully opposing Alaska House Bill 221, which would officially recognize the 229 tribes in Alaska that are already recognized at the federal level.

In February 2020, during a budget vote in which fellow Republican David Eastman tried to add amendments eliminating a $5000 line item to be paid to Planned Parenthood to reimburse it for court fees for an earlier lawsuit against the state of Alaska, Carpenter stood by the award. While noting that he didn't like where the money was going, he asserted the state had lost a case in court which by law required it to make the payment. Like other Republicans in the Alaska House, Carpenter opposes abortion. On all other matters of the day, Carpenter stood with Eastman.

In late 2020 and early 2021, Carpenter joined many of his fellow Republicans in their attempts to overturn the 2020 United States presidential election. He frequently cast doubts on the legitimacy of the election, and posted on his public Facebook page his belief that the election had been corrupt. On December 8, Carpenter, along with some Republican colleagues, urged Governor Mike Dunleavy to have the state of Alaska join Texas v. Pennsylvania, a suit seeking to temporarily withhold the certified vote count from four states prior to the Electoral College vote on December 14.

Carpenter later posted in support of the 2021 storming of the United States Capitol, making favorable comparisons between the men and women who had stormed the US Capitol and America's decision to join World War II, saying:

Not too long ago, freedom loving people were faced with a choice between peace and conflict. Many said that conciliation would prevent WWII. Today many say that accepting a corrupt election is the path to peace. Peace at any cost will never produce a free people. Today we will learn which Republicans stand with the people and which ones stand with the continuation of power at all costs.

== Comparison of COVID-19 public health measures to Nazi Germany ==
Carpenter stated that he believed people were "overreacting" to the COVID-19 pandemic, and that this was unacceptably curtailing people's liberties.

In 2020, Carpenter attracted significant criticism when he sent a mass email to all of his colleagues, comparing health screening stickers to the yellow badges that Jews were forced to wear during the Holocaust. Carpenter objected to a new requirement in his workplace that required wearing a sticker to indicate one has been screened for COVID-19 in order to be permitted to enter the Capitol building, saying, "If my sticker falls off, do I get a new one or do I get public shaming too? Are the stickers available as a yellow Star of David?"

The House had been in recess since March due to COVID-19 concerns, and the new protocols were part of a plan to insure safety as the House was planning to re-convene the week of May 18, 2020 to settle matters relating to a lawsuit challenging the constitutionality of the distribution of federal COVID-19 relief funds.

Carpenter's colleague Grier Hopkins, who is Jewish, immediately wrote back to say, "Ben, this is disgusting. Keep your Holocaust jokes to yourself."

Carpenter was called on to apologize by several colleagues both within and without the Republican party—though several Republican colleagues, like Sarah Vance, supported his statements. Carpenter at first refused to apologize and instead continued to justify his remarks. In a later interview he said, "Can we even say it is totally out of the realm of possibility that COVID-19 patients will be rounded up and taken somewhere?" In the same interview he claimed that Adolf Hitler was not a white supremacist, and that Hitler was just "fearful of the Jewish nation". Later he said, "If there were more people standing up for the loss of liberties prior to World War II, maybe we wouldn’t have had the Holocaust."

After attracting a fresh round of criticism from these subsequent comments, Carpenter continued to justify them, sending text messages to the interviewer, saying: "The point was that it was fear that drove him. The attention of his fear was undesirables, including Jews. And the larger point is that PEOPLE FOLLOWED HIM."

A few days later, Carpenter wrote an apology by way of an op-ed in Must Read Alaska, a publication funded in part by the Alaska GOP. Carpenter wrote, "My email comments have been perceived by many to be offensive. For any offense taken, I apologize because my words are my responsibility."

At the time Carpenter wrote the original email, 10 Alaskans had died from COVID-19.

In September and October 2020, Carpenter recanted his initial resistance to these public health measures, saying that they had been the "correct response". At the same time he stated his belief that the danger was past and going forward no COVID-related public health measures were necessary.

== Electoral history ==
Nonpartisan primary
Party	Candidate	Votes	%
Coalition Republican	Jesse Bjorkman (incumbent)	2,924	44.3
Republican	Ben Carpenter	2,660	40.3
Democratic	Tina Wegener	845	12.8
Independence	Andy Cizek (withdrew)	172	2.6
Total votes		6,601	100.0

2024 Alaska Senate General election
Party	Candidate	First choice			Round 1			Round 2	
Party	Candidate	Votes	%	Transfer	Votes	%	Transfer	Votes	%
Coalition Republican	Jesse Bjorkman	9,234	47.82%	+23	9,257	47.92%	+545	9,802	54.71%
Republican	Ben Carpenter	7,848	40.64%	+17	7,865	40.71%	+249	8,114	45.29%
Democratic	Tina Wegener	2,182	11.3%	+14	2,196	11.37%	-2,196	Eliminated	
Write-in		47	0.24%	-47	Eliminated				
Total votes		19,311			19,318			17,916	
Blank or inactive ballots					820		+1,402	2,222	
Republican hold									
Coalition hold									
