= Linda Menard =

American politician

Member of the Alaska Senate from the G district
- In office January 20, 2009 – January 15, 2013
- Preceded by: Lyda Green
- Succeeded by: Mike Dunleavy

Personal details
- Born: December 21, 1943 (age 82) Cheboygan, Michigan
- Party: Republican
- Spouse: Curtis D. Menard (died 2009)
- Children: Robert, Curtis, Steven, Dirk, McKenzy
- Education: University of Alaska

Linda K. Menard (born December 21, 1943) is a former Republican member of the Alaska Senate. She represented the G District from 2009 through 2012. She had previously served for over a decade on the Matanuska-Susitna Borough school board, including as president.

Her husband, Curtis D. Menard (1944–2009), himself had served in the Senate from 1991 to 1993, as well as serving three terms in the Alaska House of Representatives. Curt Menard was serving as mayor of the Matanuska-Susitna Borough at the time of his death. The Curtis D. Menard Memorial Sports Center in Wasilla would later be named in his honor.

Menard was initially known at the beginning of her tenure in the Senate, to some degree of scorn, for her efforts in establishing Marmot Day in Alaska, a cause originally championed by Curt Menard. Following the successful passage of the legislation in April 2009, she has focused most of her efforts on support for and work on constructing the Knik Arm Crossing bridge project.

On August 28, 2012, Menard lost her election bid in the Republican primary to Mike Dunleavy.
