= Nikiski High School =

Location
- Nikiski, Alaska 99635; United States
- Coordinates: 60°44′04″N 151°17′48″W

Information
- CEEB code: 020274
- Enrollment: 308 (2023-2024)
- Colors: Black, white, and silver
- Mascot: Bulldog
- Website: https://kpbsd.org/schools/nikiski-middle-high/

Nikiski High School is a public high school in the Kenai Peninsula Borough School District located in Nikiski, Alaska.

The school population is approximately 400 students in grades 6-12 and it is classified as a 3A school by the Alaska School Activities Association.

Nikiski High School offers football, volleyball, cross-country, wrestling, basketball, soccer, baseball, cross-country skiing, track and field, dance troupe, and DDF (drama, debate, and forensics). The football team were state champions in 2011.

== Former faculty ==
- Jesse Bjorkman, Alaska state senator

== See also ==
- List of high schools in Alaska
