= Kenai Spur Highway =

Highway in Alaska

- Kenai Spur Highway highlighted in red

Route information
- Length: 38.787 mi (62.422 km)
- Existed: c. 1951–present

Major junctions
- South end: AK-1 (Sterling Highway) in Soldotna
- North end: Bay Beach Road in Nikiski

Location
- Country: United States
- State: Alaska
- Boroughs: Kenai Peninsula

Highway system
- Alaska Routes; Interstate; Scenic Byways

The Kenai Spur Highway is a 39-mile-long (63 km) highway on the Kenai Peninsula in the U.S. state of Alaska. The road begins at a junction with the Sterling Highway in Soldotna and provides access to the towns of Kenai and Nikiski, dead-ending at the entrance to the Captain Cook State Recreation Area. Visitors traveling between the Homer area and these areas can bypass Soldotna and access the Spur Highway via Kalifornsky Beach Road. The highway is a four-lane undivided road inside of the cities of Soldotna and Kenai and a two-lane road elsewhere. The northern section of the road is also known as the North Kenai Road. In 2018, the Federal Highway Administration approved a plan to extend the road by eight miles to improve access to remote homes in the area.

== Major intersections ==
The entire route is in Kenai Peninsula Borough.

Location	mi	km	Destinations	Notes
Soldotna	0.000	0.000	Sterling Highway (AK-1)	Southern terminus
Kenai	10.310	16.592	Airport Way	Access to Kenai Airport
Kenai	10.675	17.180	Bridge Access Road	Alternate access to Sterling highway via Kalifornsky Beach Road
Kenai	11.054	17.790	Willow Street	Access to central Kenai
Kenai	11.359	18.281	Main Street Loop	Forms loop around central Kenai
Nikiski	26.751	43.052	Nikiski Beach Road	Access to Nikiski High School
Nikiski	38.787	62.422	Bay Beach Road	Northern terminus
1.000 mi = 1.609 km; 1.000 km = 0.621 mi
