= Kenai, Alaska =

City in Alaska, United States

Kenai, Alaska Shk'ituk't (Denaʼina) Кенай (Russian)
- City
- Seal Logo
- Motto: "Village with a Past - City with a Future"
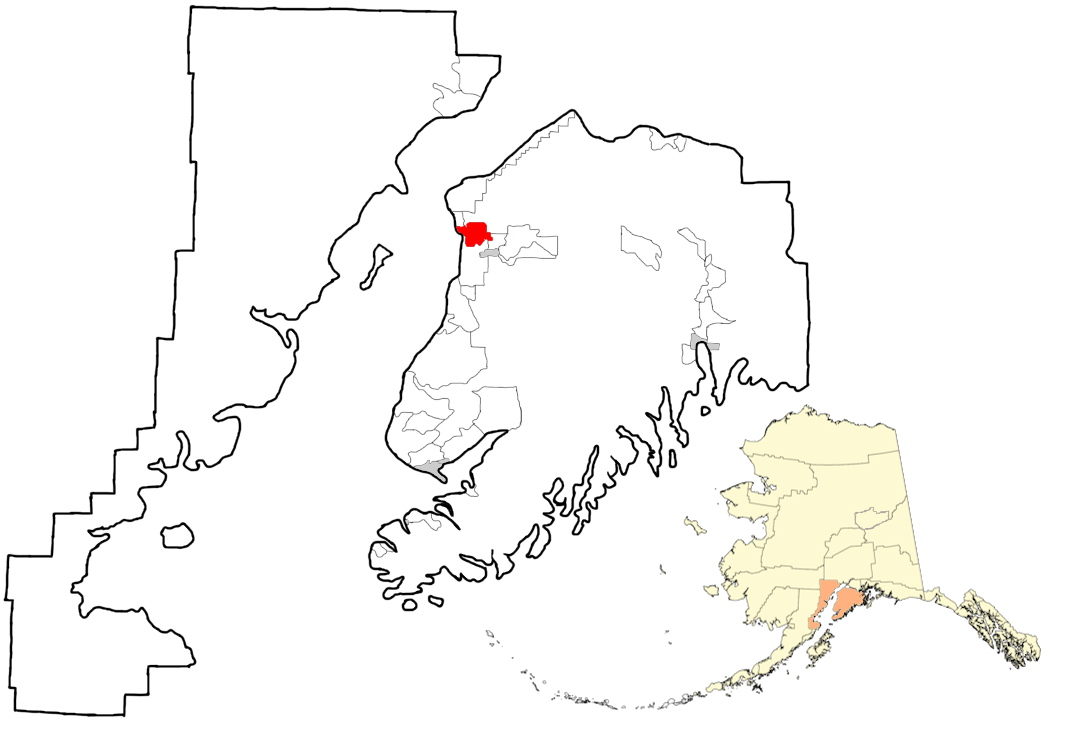
- Location in Kenai Peninsula Borough, Alaska
- Coordinates: 60°33′31″N 151°13′47″W
- Country: United States
- State: Alaska
- Borough: Kenai Peninsula
- Incorporated: May 10, 1960

Government
  - Mayor: Henry Knackstedt
  - State senator: Jesse Bjorkman (R)
  - State rep.: Justin Ruffridge (R)

Area
  - Total: 35.97 sq mi (93.15 km^{2})
  - Land: 29.14 sq mi (75.47 km^{2})
  - Water: 6.82 sq mi (17.67 km^{2})
- Elevation: 72 ft (22 m)

Population (2020)
  - Total: 7,424
  - Density: 254.8/sq mi (98.37/km^{2})
- Time zone: UTC−9 (Alaska (AKST))
  - Summer (DST): UTC−8 (AKDT)
- ZIP codes: 99611, 99635
- Area code: 907
- FIPS code: 02-38420
- GNIS feature ID: 1413299, 2419407
- Website: www.kenai.city

Kenai (/ˈkiːnaɪ/, KEE-ny; Dena'ina: Shk'ituk't; Russian: Кенай, romanized: Kenay) is a city in the Kenai Peninsula Borough in the U.S. state of Alaska. By road, it is 158 miles southwest of Anchorage. The population was 7,424 as of the 2020 census, up from 7,100 in 2010, the seventh-most populated city in the state.

== History ==
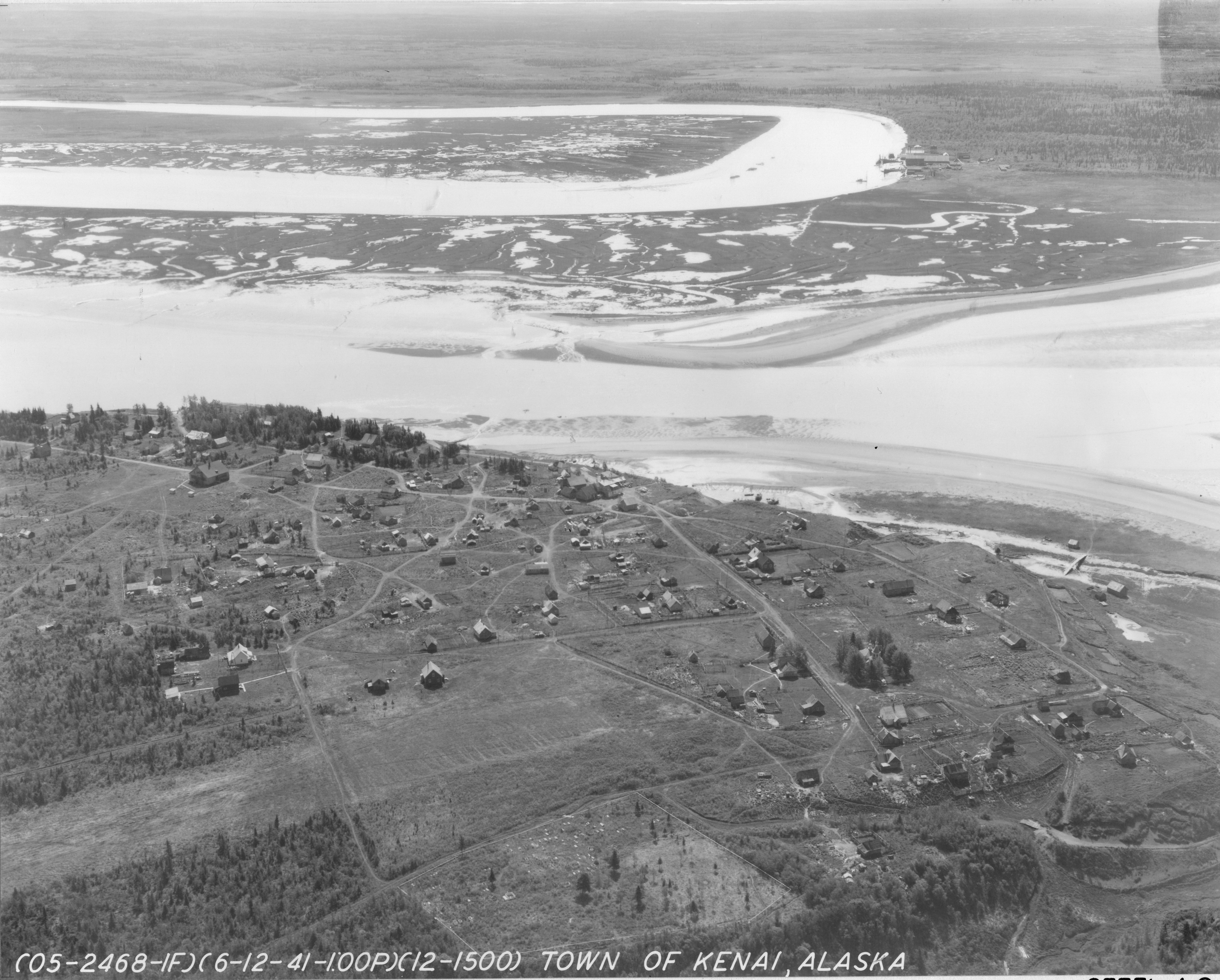
Kenai in the 1940s

The city of Kenai is named after the local Dena'ina word 'ken' or 'kena', which means 'flat, meadow, open area with few trees; base, low ridge', according to the Dena'ina Topical Dictionary by James Kari, Ph.D., published in 2007. This describes the area along the mouth and portion of the Kenai River near the City of Kenai. Archaeological evidence suggests that the area was first occupied by the Kachemak people from 1000 B.C., until they were displaced by the Dena'ina Athabaskan people around 1000 A.D. Before the arrival of the Russians, Kenai was a Dena'ina village called Shk'ituk't, meaning "where we slide down." When Russian fur traders first arrived in 1741, about 1,000 Dena'ina lived in the village. The traders called the people "Kenaitze", which is a Russian term for "people of the flats", or "Kenai people". This name was later adopted when they were incorporated as the Kenaitze Alaskan Natives in the early 1970s.

=== Fur trade ===
In 1786, Pytor Zaykov built Nikolaevskaia krepost (Fort Nicholas) for the Lebedev-Lastochkin Company on the site of modern Kenai, being the first European settlement on the Alaskan mainland. Hostilities surfaced between the natives and settlers in 1797, culminating in an incident in which the Dena'ina attacked Fort St. Nicholas, later dubbed the battle of Kenai. Over one hundred deaths occurred from all involved parties. In 1838, the introduction of smallpox killed one half of the Dena'ina population.

=== United States ===
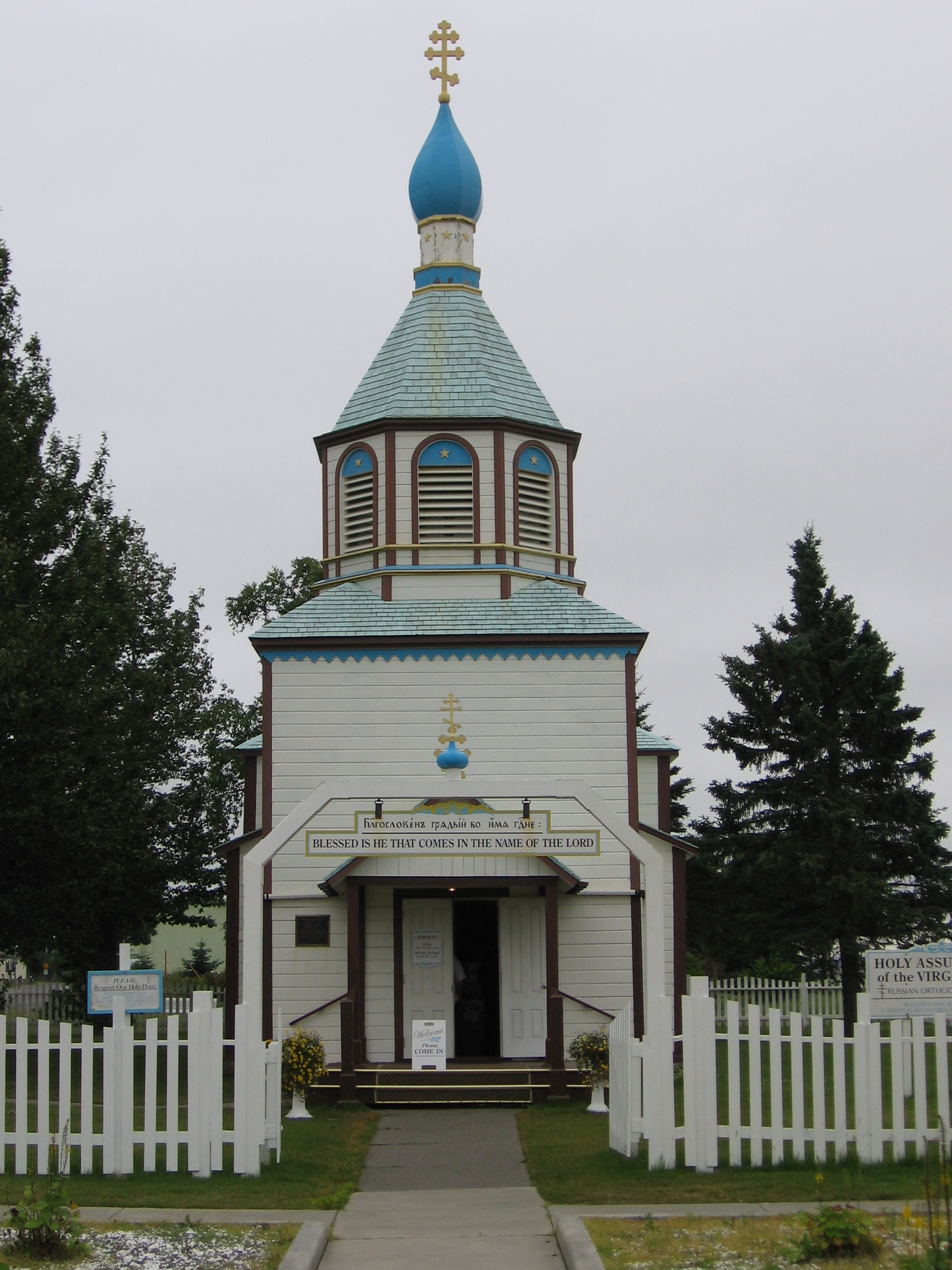
Holy Assumption Russian Orthodox Church

In 1869, after the Alaska Purchase, the United States Army established a post called Fort Kenay. It was soon abandoned.

In 1895–96, the Holy Assumption of the Virgin Mary Russian Orthodox Church was built in the village. It is still in use today.

The establishment of shipping companies in the early 1900s broadened Kenai into a port city. Canning companies were established and helped fuel the commercial fishing boom that was the primary activity through the 1920s.

In 1940, homesteads were opened in the area. The first dirt road from Anchorage was constructed in 1951; pavement would not arrive until 1956 with the construction of the Kenai Spur Highway.

A military base, Wildwood Army Station (later Wildwood Air Force Station), was established in 1953, and served as a major communications post. Wildwood was conveyed in 1974 to the Kenai Native Association in partial settlement of Alaska Native land claims. The facility was leased and later purchased by the State of Alaska and presently serves as the Wildwood Correctional Complex.

=== Statehood ===
In 1965, offshore oil discoveries in Cook Inlet caused a period of rapid growth. They were a part of a series of oil deposits located during the middle of the 20th century. In 1957, oil was discovered at Swanson River, 20 miles (32 km) northeast of Kenai. This was the first major oil discovery in Alaska.

In 1992 and 2011, Kenai was named one of the All-America Cities.

In 2008, the Kenai River was designated as a Category 5, or "impaired," water body by the State of Alaska in accordance with the federal Clean Water Act. The Kenai River Working Group (KRWG) was formed to address the issue of water pollution. By 2010, the status of the river was changed to a Category 2, or "water that attains its designated uses."

== Geography ==
Kenai is located at 60°33′31″N 151°13′47″W (60.558738, −151.229616), on the west side of the Kenai Peninsula near the outlet of the Kenai River to the Cook Inlet of the Pacific Ocean. According to the United States Census Bureau, the city has a total area of 35.5 square miles (92 km^{2}), of which, 29.9 square miles (77 km^{2}) of it is land and 5.6 square miles (15 km^{2}) of it (15.85%) is water.

=== Climate ===
As with much of Southcentral Alaska, Kenai has a moderate dry-summer subarctic climate (Köppen climate classification: Dsc) due to the cool summers. Winters are snowy, long but not particularly cold, especially considering the latitude, with January featuring a daily average temperature of 15.8 °F (−9.0 °C). Snow averages 63.6 inches (162 cm) per season, falling primarily from October through March, with some accumulation in April, and rarely in May or September. There are 37 nights of sub-0 °F (−18 °C) lows annually, and the area lies in USDA Plant Hardiness Zone 4, indicating an average annual minimum in the −20 to −30 °F (−29 to −34 °C) range. Summers are cool due to the marine influence, with 75 °F (24 °C)+ highs or 55 °F (13 °C)+ lows being extremely rare. Extreme temperatures have ranged from −48 °F (−44 °C) on February 4, 1947, up to 89 °F (32 °C) on July 4, 2019.

Climate data for Kenai Municipal Airport, Alaska (1991–2020 normals, extremes 1899–present)
Month	Jan	Feb	Mar	Apr	May	Jun	Jul	Aug	Sep	Oct	Nov	Dec	Year
Record high °F (°C)	49 (9)	52 (11)	59 (15)	69 (21)	82 (28)	87 (31)	89 (32)	86 (30)	75 (24)	63 (17)	59 (15)	56 (13)	89 (32)
Mean maximum °F (°C)	40.7 (4.8)	41.6 (5.3)	44.7 (7.1)	56.3 (13.5)	69.2 (20.7)	73.7 (23.2)	74.5 (23.6)	73.3 (22.9)	65.1 (18.4)	55.4 (13.0)	43.6 (6.4)	40.8 (4.9)	77.5 (25.3)
Mean daily maximum °F (°C)	22.4 (−5.3)	28.1 (−2.2)	32.7 (0.4)	44.3 (6.8)	54.5 (12.5)	60.2 (15.7)	63.3 (17.4)	62.7 (17.1)	55.7 (13.2)	43.1 (6.2)	30.2 (−1.0)	25.1 (−3.8)	43.5 (6.4)
Daily mean °F (°C)	14.9 (−9.5)	19.9 (−6.7)	23.6 (−4.7)	36.0 (2.2)	45.4 (7.4)	52.1 (11.2)	56.0 (13.3)	54.8 (12.7)	47.8 (8.8)	35.9 (2.2)	23.2 (−4.9)	18.1 (−7.7)	35.6 (2.0)
Mean daily minimum °F (°C)	7.4 (−13.7)	11.6 (−11.3)	14.4 (−9.8)	27.7 (−2.4)	36.4 (2.4)	44.0 (6.7)	48.8 (9.3)	46.8 (8.2)	39.8 (4.3)	28.6 (−1.9)	16.1 (−8.8)	11.0 (−11.7)	27.7 (−2.4)
Mean minimum °F (°C)	−20.6 (−29.2)	−13.9 (−25.5)	−8.6 (−22.6)	11.4 (−11.4)	27.0 (−2.8)	33.7 (0.9)	38.8 (3.8)	34.3 (1.3)	25.4 (−3.7)	11.6 (−11.3)	−6.7 (−21.5)	−14.5 (−25.8)	−25.4 (−31.9)
Record low °F (°C)	−47 (−44)	−48 (−44)	−41 (−41)	−22 (−30)	12 (−11)	26 (−3)	27 (−3)	24 (−4)	−3 (−19)	−12 (−24)	−27 (−33)	−43 (−42)	−48 (−44)
Average precipitation inches (mm)	0.89 (23)	0.83 (21)	0.64 (16)	0.58 (15)	0.79 (20)	1.20 (30)	1.98 (50)	2.68 (68)	3.57 (91)	2.56 (65)	1.41 (36)	1.14 (29)	18.27 (464)
Average snowfall inches (cm)	9.8 (25)	10.5 (27)	9.2 (23)	1.8 (4.6)	0.2 (0.51)	0.0 (0.0)	0.0 (0.0)	0.0 (0.0)	0.2 (0.51)	7.1 (18)	13.5 (34)	15.2 (39)	67.5 (171.62)
Average precipitation days (≥ 0.01 in)	8.1	8.2	6.0	6.0	8.0	10.1	12.7	14.1	15.7	13.2	9.8	10.5	122.4
Average snowy days (≥ 0.1 in)	7.5	6.3	4.8	1.7	0.1	0.0	0.0	0.0	0.1	2.9	7.0	9.6	40.0
Source 1: NOAA (average snowfall/snow days 1981–2010)
Source 2: National Weather Service

== Demographics ==
Historical population
Census	Pop.	Note	%±
1880	44		—
1890	264		500.0%
1900	290		9.8%
1910	250		−13.8%
1920	332		32.8%
1930	286		−13.9%
1940	303		5.9%
1950	321		5.9%
1960	778		142.4%
1970	3,533		354.1%
1980	4,324		22.4%
1990	6,327		46.3%
2000	6,942		9.7%
2010	7,100		2.3%
2020	7,424		4.6%
U.S. Decennial Census

Kenai first appeared on the 1880 U.S. Census as the unincorporated "Creole" (mixed Russian and Native people) village of Kenai Rédoute. It was simply shortened to Kenai with the 1890 census. It was officially incorporated in 1960.

=== 2020 census ===
As of the 2020 census, Kenai had a population of 7,424. The median age was 35.0 years. 26.8% of residents were under the age of 18 and 14.3% of residents were 65 years of age or older. For every 100 females there were 102.2 males, and for every 100 females age 18 and over there were 98.6 males age 18 and over.

75.7% of residents lived in urban areas, while 24.3% lived in rural areas.

There were 2,953 households in Kenai, of which 33.0% had children under the age of 18 living in them. Of all households, 41.7% were married-couple households, 21.8% were households with a male householder and no spouse or partner present, and 27.4% were households with a female householder and no spouse or partner present. About 31.0% of all households were made up of individuals and 11.5% had someone living alone who was 65 years of age or older.

There were 3,338 housing units, of which 11.5% were vacant. The homeowner vacancy rate was 2.2% and the rental vacancy rate was 7.8%.

Racial composition as of the 2020 census
Race	Number	Percent
White	5,295	71.3%
Black or African American	43	0.6%
American Indian and Alaska Native	733	9.9%
Asian	135	1.8%
Native Hawaiian and Other Pacific Islander	34	0.5%
Some other race	133	1.8%
Two or more races	1,051	14.2%
Hispanic or Latino (of any race)	420	5.7%

=== 2000 census ===
The median income for a household in the city was $45,962, and the median income for a family was $61,348. Males had a median income of $48,371 versus $27,112 for females. The per capita income for the city was $20,789. About 8.2% of families and 13.4% of the population were below the poverty line, including 12.5% of those under age 18 and 4.2% of those age 65 or over.

== Transportation ==
The main road access to Kenai is via the Kenai Spur Highway, which branches off of the Sterling Highway in downtown Soldotna and winds through downtown and the portions of city limits north of the Kenai River. The Warren Ames Memorial Bridge, located within city limits and the Kenai River's farthest downriver crossing, provides access to the portions of city limits south of the river and to Kalifornsky Beach Road, the latter providing an alternate access to Soldotna and the outlying road network. Beaver Loop Road provides access to neighborhoods and parklands upriver of the bridge.

Although many fishing boats are based in Kenai, the city does not have a formal port and harbor. There are docks for offloading the catch, but commercial fishing boats are generally moored offshore in the Kenai River. The nearest deep water port is in Nikiski, but is primarily reserved for use by the oil and gas extraction industry. The Kenai Airport has regularly scheduled flights to Anchorage.

== Fishing ==
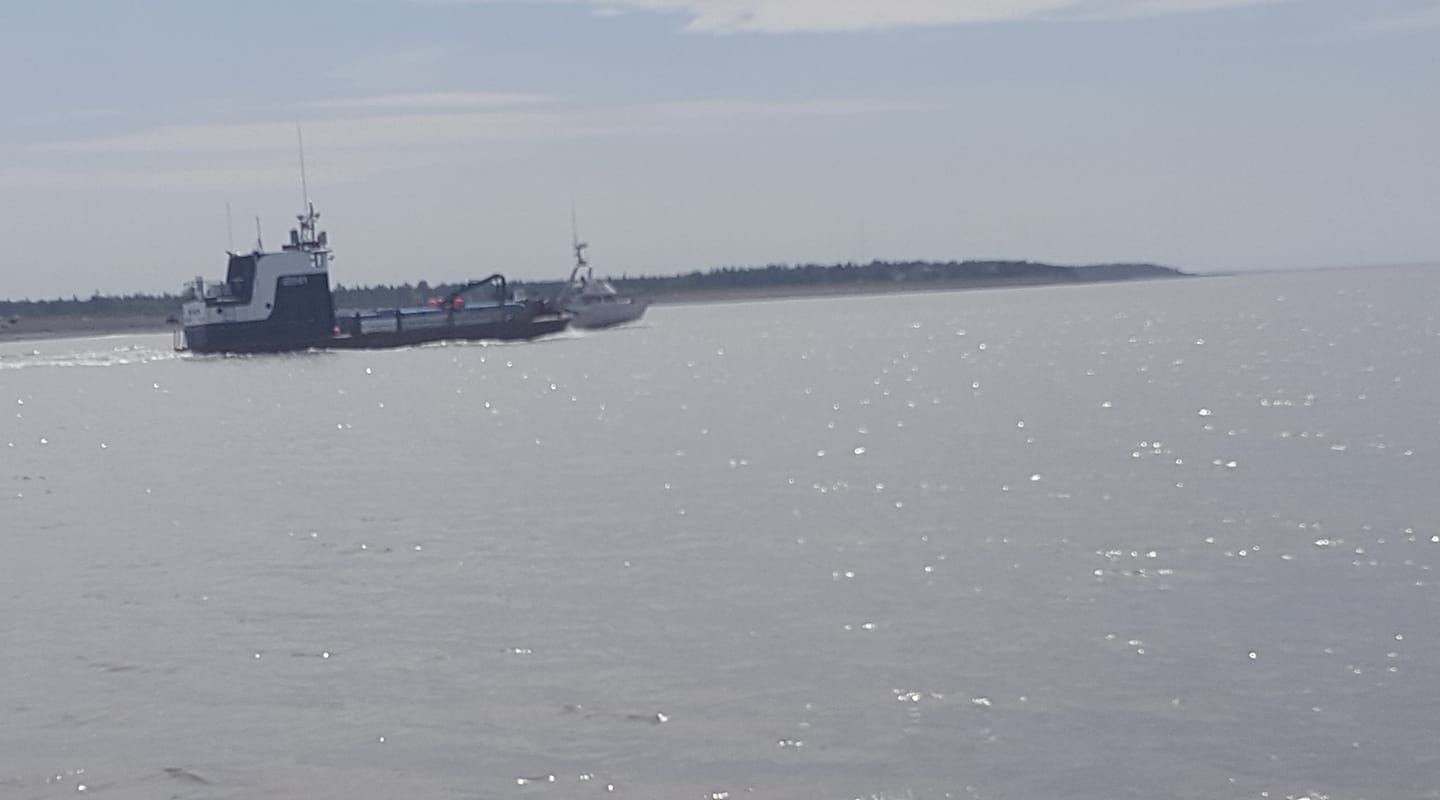
fishing boats emerging from the Kenai River into Cook Inlet

In 1985, a world record largest sport-caught Chinook (or "king") salmon was taken from the Kenai River, weighing in at 97 lbs 4oz. Eight of the ten largest king salmons caught in the world have come from the same river, making the city a popular fishing tourist location.

The lower reaches of the Kenai River, including its mouth where it empties into Cook Inlet, are within city limits. This area is the site of a designated personal use dipnet fishery during the month of July, one of a number of such fisheries throughout various parts of Alaska, that is open annually to residents of the state. The dipnetting season and fishing limitations are set by the Alaska Department of Fish and Game, and require fishermen to carry personal use fishing permits and only fish within designated regions and limits. Because the fishery is easily accessible and open to all Alaska residents, participation has grown over time, creating a significant strain on city resources as they deal with litter, fish waste, fire hazards and other issues associated with having in excess of ten thousand extra persons in the city during this period.

== Sister cities ==
- Nikiski, Alaska
- Soldotna, Alaska

== Notable people ==
- Philip H. Ross, U.S. Navy Rear Admiral, double Navy Cross recipient
- Allie Ostrander, professional long distance runner, NCAA three-time champion

== See also ==
- Kenai River
- Coral Seymour Ballpark
- Peninsula Clarion, a regional paper published in Kenai
