= 26th Alaska State Legislature =

Alaskan legislature

The 26th Alaska State Legislature was elected in November 2008.

== Sessions ==
Session	Date
First session	January 20, 2009 – May 19, 2009
Special session	August 10, 2009
Second session	January 19, 2010 – April 18, 2010

== Leadership ==
Position	Name	Party	District
Speaker	Mike Chenault	Republican	District 34
Majority Leader	Johnny Ellis	Democratic	District L
Minority Leader	Con Bunde	Republican	District P

== Members ==
Alaska State House of Representatives 26th Alaska Legislature, 2009-2010
District	Name	Party	Location
1	Kyle Johansen	Republican	Ketchikan
2	Peggy Wilson	Republican	Wrangell
3	Beth Kerttula	Democratic	Juneau
4	Cathy Muñoz	Republican	Juneau
5	Bill Thomas	Republican	Haines
6	Woodie Salmon	Democratic	Beaver
7	Mike Kelly	Republican	Fairbanks
8	David Guttenberg	Democratic	Fairbanks
9	Scott Kawasaki	Democratic	Fairbanks
10	Jay Ramras	Republican	Fairbanks
11	John B. Coghill, Jr.	Republican	North Pole
12	John L. Harris	Republican	Valdez
13	Carl J. Gatto	Republican	Palmer
14	Wes Keller	Republican	Wasilla
15	Mark A. Neuman	Republican	Wasilla
16	Bill Stoltze	Republican	Chugiak/Mat-Su
17	Anna I. Fairclough	Republican	Eagle River
18	Nancy A. Dahlstrom	Republican	Anchorage
19	Pete Petersen	Democratic	Anchorage
20	Max Gruenberg	Democratic	Anchorage
21	Harry Crawford	Democratic	Anchorage
22	Sharon Cissna	Democratic	Anchorage
23	Les Gara	Democratic	Anchorage
24	Berta Gardner	Democratic	Anchorage
25	Mike Doogan	Democratic	Anchorage
26	Lindsey Holmes	Democratic	Anchorage
27	Bob Buch	Democratic	Anchorage
28	Craig W. Johnson	Republican	Anchorage
29	Chris Tuck	Democratic	Anchorage
30	Kevin Meyer	Republican	Anchorage
31	Bob Lynn	Republican	Anchorage
32	Mike Hawker	Republican	Anchorage
33	Kurt Olson	Republican	Kenai
34	Charles Chenault	Republican	Nikiski
35	Paul Seaton	Republican	Homer
36	Alan Austerman	Republican	Kodiak
37	Bryce Edgmon	Democratic	Unalaska
38	Bob Herron	Democratic	Bethel
39	Richard Foster	Democratic	Nome
40	Reggie Joule	Democratic	Kotzebue

== See also ==
- List of Alaska State Legislatures
- 25th Alaska State Legislature
- List of governors of Alaska
- List of speakers of the Alaska House of Representatives
- Alaska Legislature
- Alaska Senate
