= Ann Spohnholz =

American politician (1950–2024)

Member of the Alaska House of Representatives from district 13, seat A
- In office January 9, 1989 – April 12, 1989
- Appointed by: Steve Cowper
- Preceded by: Pat Pourchot
- Succeeded by: David Finkelstein

Personal details
- Born: Mary Ann Spohnholz; April 18, 1950 Northampton, Massachusetts, U.S
- Died: June 9, 2024 (aged 74) Anchorage, Alaska, U.S
- Children: 4, including Ivy

Mary Ann Spohnholz (April 18, 1950 – June 9, 2024) was an American educator, feminist, and politician who served as a member of the Alaska House of Representatives from January 9, 1989, until April 12 of that same year. She was appointed by Governor Steve Cowper to fill a vacancy until a special election was held on April 5, 1989.

== Biography ==
Spohnholz was born in Northampton, Massachusetts, she attended Amhurst Regional High School before earning a degree from Alaska Pacific University. Due to a vacancy being left in the 13th State House District, which covered Mountain View and East Anchorage, due to the need for a runoff, Spohnholz was appointed by Governor Steve Cowper to fill a vacancy until a special election was held on April 5, 1989. She was succeeded by David Finkelstein.

She ran for a full term in the state house in the 1990 elections, but was defeated by Terry Martin by a margin of 25 votes. In the 1996 Alaska State House of Representative elections, Spohnholz ran for the open 21st district. She defeated Sharon Cissna in the Democratic Primary by a margin of a single vote, but was defeated by Joe Ryan by only eleven votes.

In 2013, she earned a master's degree in English from the University of Alaska Anchorage and was a teacher briefly before her retirement. Her daughter, Ivy Spohnholz was also a member of the Alaska State House.

Spohnholz died on June 9, 2024, at the age of 74. Her funeral was held on June 16. Governor Mike Dunleavy ordered the Alaska and United States flags to fly at half-staff on June 17.
