= Smalley =

Smalley may refer to:

== People ==
- Smalley (surname)

== Places ==
- Smalley's Inn & Restaurant in Carmel, New York, USA
- Smalley, Derbyshire, a village in England

== Other ==
- A type of small excavator: see Smalley (excavator)
- USS Smalley (DD-565), a Fletcher-class US navy destroyer

== See also ==
- Small (disambiguation)
- Smalleye squaretail a species of fish
