= Ivy Spohnholz =

American politician

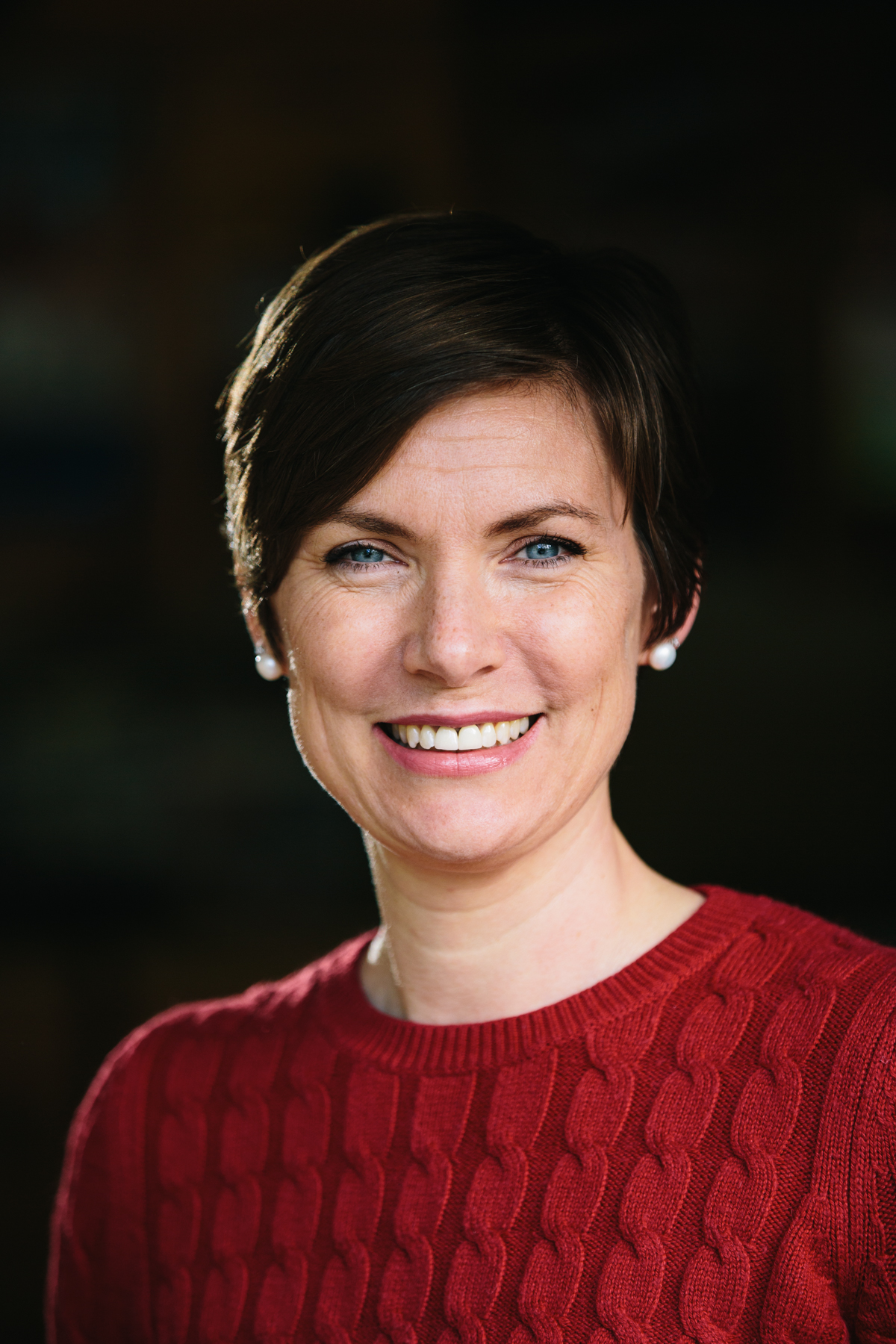

Member of the Alaska House of Representatives from the 16th district
- In office March 10, 2016 – January 17, 2023
- Preceded by: Max Gruenberg
- Succeeded by: Jennifer Armstrong

Personal details
- Born: January 17, 1973 (age 53) Nabesna, Alaska, U.S.
- Party: Democratic
- Spouse: Troy Bowler
- Relations: Ann Spohnholz (mother)
- Children: 3
- Education: University of Washington (BA); University of Washington (EMPA)
- Occupation: Legislator
- Profession: Nonprofit Executive
- Website: Campaign website

Ivy Spohnholz (born January 17, 1973) is a former Democratic member of the Alaska House of Representatives, serving the 16th district. She served beginning on March 10, 2016, after being appointed by Governor Bill Walker to fill the vacancy left by the death of longtime Representative Max Gruenberg on February 14, 2016. She was elected to a full term on November 8, 2016, with 51.52% of the vote, a 10-point margin over Republican Don Hadley. She was reelected to State House for a second time in 2018 with 55.1% of the vote, an 11-point margin over Republican Stanley Wright.

Spohnholz chairs the Alaska House Special Committee on Ways & Means, co-chairs the House Labor and Commerce Committee, and serves on the Health & Social Services, Legislative Budget & Audit and Joint Armed Services Committees. To address Alaska's notoriously high health care costs, in 2018 Spohnholz passed landmark health care price transparency legislation requiring health care providers to post their prices for consumers in public spaces and on their websites. In 2020, Spohnholz passed HB 29 expanding access to insurance coverage for telehealth care. Responding to the COVID-19 crisis, as the chair of the Labor and Commerce Committee Spohnholz passed HB 308 making it easier for Alaskans to access their unemployment insurance benefits in just six days. She was reelected in 2020 with 53% of the vote, by a margin of 12.4% over Republican Paul Bauer (40. 6%) and Libertarian Scott Kohlhaas, with 6.3%. Spohnholz chose not to file for reelection in 2022.

Spohnholz lives in East Anchorage with her husband, Troy, and their dog Spyke.

== Early life ==
Ivy was born in 1973 in a log cabin in the community of Nabesna, Alaska, near Slana, Alaska, and raised in Anchorage.

She attended Steller Secondary School in Anchorage and continued her education at the University of Washington where she received a Bachelors of Arts in Political Science in 1997 and a Masters of Public Administration in 2014.

Prior to her appointment to the Alaska House of Representatives, she was Director of Development for The Salvation Army in Alaska. Spohnholz has volunteered extensively including serving on the boards of directors for the Alaska Children's Trust and YWCA Alaska. She and her husband, Troy, have also been foster parents.

Ivy's mother, Ann Spohnholz (b. April 18, 1950), was appointed by Governor Steve Cowper to temporarily hold seat 13a in the Alaska House, while a disputed close election between Democrat David Finkelstein and incumbent Brad Bradley, was done over. She held the office from January 1989 to April 1989, when Finkelstein was elected. In 1990, she ran against seat 13b incumbent, Terry Martin, who won his 7th out of 10 House terms by only 25 votes. In 1996, she won the open primary for seat 21 by one vote over Sharon Cissna, but was defeated by Republican Joe Ryan, who took 47.82%, by 23 votes. Cissna beat Ryan two years later. Her father, Ron Spohnholz, was a police officer with Anchorage Police Department before retiring.
