= Cascade High School (Everett, Washington) =

- Front of Cascade High School

Location
- 801 East Casino Road; Everett, Washington 98203; United States; 47°55′28″N 122°13′23″W

Information
- Type: Public
- Mottoes: Bruin Pride Never Dies, Life is Good in the Bruinhood, Crimson and Grey All the Way, Bring out the Bruin (The motto changes yearly, as decided by the ASB of that year.)
- Established: September 5, 1961; 65 years ago
- School district: Everett School District
- NCES School ID: 530267000391
- Principal: Michael Takayoshi
- Teaching staff: 73.76 (FTE)
- Grades: 9–12
- Enrollment: 1,651 (2024-2025)
- Student to teacher ratio: 22.38
- Campus type: Suburban
- Colors: Crimson & Gray
- Fight song: Roll Along
- Athletics conference: Wesco 3A
- Mascot: Bruins
- Rival: Everett High School
- Yearbook: Vista Publications
- Website: cascadehs.everettsd.org

Cascade High School is a secondary school located in Everett, Washington, United States. Part of the Everett Public Schools, it caters to grades 9–12 and has an annual enrollment of approximately 1,700 students. Students attending Cascade High School live primarily within the city of Everett, but some live in Mill Creek, Snohomish, and Mukilteo. The Cascade mascot is the Bruin and the school's colors are crimson and grey.

== History ==
Prior to the construction of Cascade High School, all secondary students within the Everett School District attended Everett High School in downtown Everett from its opening in 1880. As the neighboring Mukilteo School District lacked a high school during that period, students from that district attended Everett High as well. (Note: The city of Mukilteo did not incorporate until 1947; Rosehill School at the city's waterfront was the only school in the Mukilteo School District for much of its history prior to the opening of Cascade. The arrangement of Mukilteo district students attending the Everett district for secondary education continued until the opening of Mariner High School in 1970.) One high school was sufficient for Everett between its incorporation and the end of World War II in 1945 since it had no annexation of any kind during that period.

However, the post-World War II baby boom and suburban expansion south of Everett brought unprecedented population growth for the city; four new and three replacement schools opened between 1947 and 1957 to keep up with the increased demand, with future feeder Evergreen Junior High School opening in 1958. The rapid expansion drove demand for a new high school in that area, further compounded by Boeing's plans to build a new factory there for its first wide-body aircraft, the 747. Originally projected to open for the 1960–61 school year, construction delays pushed Cascade's opening back an additional year; when it finally opened on September 5, 1961, for the 1961–62 school year, the campus initially had seven buildings built at $3 million total and $16 per square foot. While initially located in unincorporated Snohomish County, Everett annexed Cascade and its surrounding area on February 6, 1962.

Cascade underwent renovation and modernization in 1999. Everett-based Dykeman Architects & Interiors was the lead architect on the project, with Redmond-based Osborne Construction serving as general contractor.

=== Free Stehekin controversy ===
In 2007, Cascade was embroiled in controversy when district superintendent Carol Whitehead fired English and journalism teacher Kay Grant Powers over a dispute on the district-unauthorized publication of the Free Stehekin, an underground paper published by Cascade students with the help of Powers. Powers, an unabashed leftist and ardent free speech supporter who had taught at Cascade since 1984, was accused by Whitehead of using school equipment to print the paper, damaging the reputation of the district in the process. The dispute was related to a 2005 lawsuit filed by two Everett High students who were co-editors of the Kodak, the school's newspaper; the lawsuit, settled by the former editors and the district in August 2007, was filed over the ability of school administrators to review the newspaper before publication. In the meantime, the district's enforcement of prior review policies forced the Kodak and the Free Stehekin underground as well as the Tyro, the literary magazine of Cascade.

While Powers had emailed Whitehead in February 2007, agreeing to not use school equipment for the Free Stehekin, Powers admitted that some use had occurred. It was later revealed that on May 10, a hidden camera was installed in Powers' classroom by a vendor under request of the district, whose officials denied its existence for four months until evidence was shown to the contrary. The teachers' union agreed to dispute Powers' firing, with a public hearing scheduled for mid-April 2008; however, Powers and Whitehead agreed to a settlement on April 11. Under the settlement, Powers was reinstated with back pay as an English teacher for Henry M. Jackson High School before retiring in August 2009. Meanwhile, Whitehead retired on August 31, 2008, partly over her family's concerns about a mailed death threat she received at district headquarters in late April of that year. Powers ultimately died at her Seattle residence on January 4, 2019; she was 76 years old and suffering from dementia.

Craig Verver sexual abuse controversy

In 2016 and 2017, the Everett School District and Cascade High School teacher Craig Verver were named as defendants in lawsuits by two former students, accusing Craig Verver of grooming and sexual abuse of students, and accusing the school district of negligently failing to act to protect students from his abuse. The Everett School District kept Craig Verver employed on paid leave even after he admitted in deposition to having sex with one of the students in his classroom. Instead of firing the disgraced teacher, the Everett School District instead allowed Craig Verver to simply quietly resign his position, effective June 2018. He voluntarily surrendered his teaching certificate to the Washington Office of the Superintendent of Public Instruction in January 2019.

=== School-Based Health Center ===
In 2026, Cascade announced a school-based health center, which is staffed by a team of experienced and compassionate providers who provide students with safe, private, and accessible health services on campus run by Community Health Center of Snohomish County. A school-based health center is a standard model used nationally and locally to increase access to preventative and acute healthcare services for young people in public school settings. There are currently over 65 operating in Washington State. Nationally, there are nearly 2,600 clinics in operation. There is no out-of-pocket cost for students accessing services at the school-based health center. Health insurance, if available, will be billed for eligible services, but families will not receive a bill for service costs above insurance coverage.

=== Demographics ===
As of 2026, student demographics were 37.4% White, 28.2% Hispanic, 16.8% Asian, 7.9% Two or More Races, 6.9% Black, 1.6% Native Hawaiian/Pacific Islander, and 0.3% American Indian/Alaska Native.

61% of students are categorized as low-income and receive free or reduced benefits.

== Academics ==
The school offers multiple Advanced Placement courses, with over 40% of the student body taking at least one AP course. Courses include AP Seminar, AP Research, AP Business with Personal Finance, AP English Language and Composition, AP English Literature and Composition, AP 2-D Art and Design, AP 3-D Art and Design, AP Drawing, AP Calculus AB, AP Calculus BC, AP Computer Science A, AP Computer Science Principles, AP Statistics, AP Biology, AP Chemistry, AP Environmental Science, AP Physics 1, AP African American Studies, AP Human Geography, AP World History: Modern, AP United States History, AP Macroeconomics, AP Microeconomics, AP Psychology, AP US Government and Politics, AP Spanish Language and Culture, AP Spanish Literature and Culture, AP French Language and Culture, and AP German Language and Culture.

Cascade High School offers multiple CTE courses that prepare students with technical, academic, andemployability skills for success in the workplace and in further education by ensuring all students have opportunities to explore in-demand career pathways. Courses include Business Law, Business Operations, Publications, Child Development, Introduction to Education, Sports Medicine & Therapeutic Care, Automotive Technology, Manufacturing, Mechatronics, and more.

In 2026, Cascade High School became a candidate school for the International Baccalaureate (IB) Diploma Programme. Pending authorization, the school plans to launch the two-year curriculum for grades 11 and 12 in the 2027–28 academic year, beginning with the graduating Class of 2029. Prior to full implementation, the school introduced a preparatory course titled Pre-IB Foundations & Leadership, which focuses on IB academic skills, leadership development, and community service.

== Athletics ==
Cascade High School is part of District One of the Washington Interscholastic Activities Association (WIAA). Cascade was a longtime member of Wesco 4A, but dropped down to 3A in 2020 due to WIAA guideline changes; its adjusted enrollment had dropped to the 3A level in 2016, but Cascade elected to remain in 4A up to that point. In 2026, Cascade rejoined the 3A level in 2026 following Wesco 3A redistricting. Cascade is now a part of Wesco 3A Central, joining neighboring schools Snohomish, Marysville Getchell, Monroe, and Everett. Cascade offers sports including men's baseball, basketball, football, soccer, tennis, track and field, cross-country, golf, wrestling, and swimming. Women's sports offerings include flag football, tennis, basketball, volleyball, soccer, fast-pitch softball, cross-country, track and field, swimming, wrestling, golf, and bowling.

Cascade was one of many Washington Interscholastic Activities Association (WIAA) schools to offer a girl's flag football team in its inaugural 2025–2026 season. The team went to the WIAA 4A State Playoffs and were honored at the school.

== Traditions ==
Since 1961, students at Cascade High School have participated in an annual December food drive to collect and distribute donated foodstuffs to local households and community organizations. The 2025 food drive collected 51,000 cans of food, 1,000 gifts, and $19,000 in donations for charity use.

Cascade holds annual matchups against their rival, Everett High School. They have two large sporting events against Everett: Battle for Broadway during the football season and BruGull Fest during the basketball season.

== Notable alumni ==
- Ryan G. Anderson, convicted terrorist
- Gary Bryan, radio personality
- Patrick Duffy, actor, starring in such series as Dallas, Man from Atlantis and Step By Step
- Chris Henderson, soccer player for the US national team
- Mark Hodgins, former member of the Alaska House of Representatives
- Geoff Reece, NFL center
- Marc Schneider, Olympic rower who competed at the 1996 and 2000 Summer Olympics.
- Grady Sizemore, former MLB player
- Steven Souza Jr., former MLB player
- Cam McHarg, actor and film director
