= Jim Whitaker =

American politician

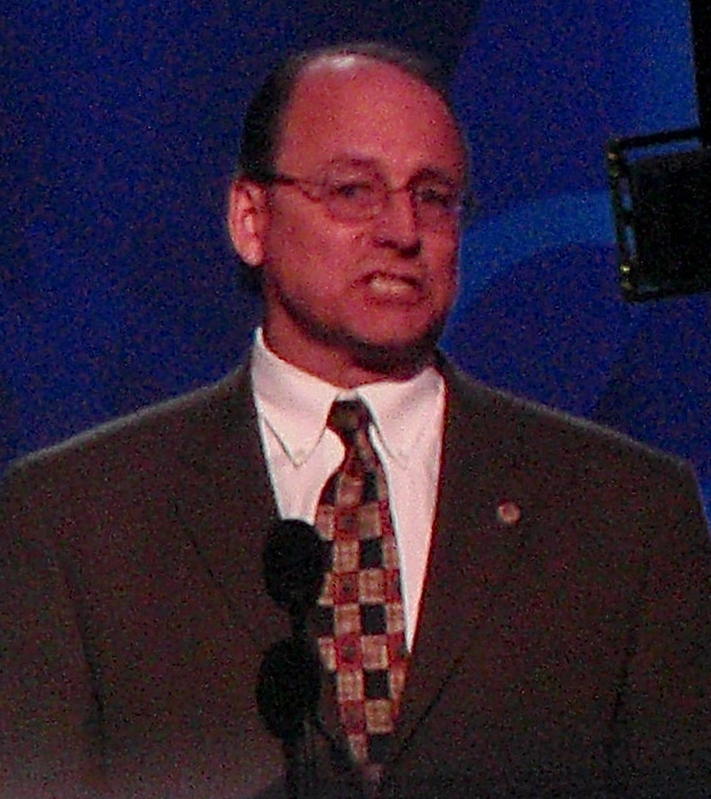
- Whitaker in 2008

9th Mayor of the Fairbanks North Star Borough, Alaska
- In office October 27, 2003 – November 16, 2009
- Preceded by: Rhonda Boyles
- Succeeded by: Luke Hopkins

Member of the Alaska House of Representatives from the 10th district
- In office January 21, 2003 – October 27, 2003
- Preceded by: (redistricting)
- Succeeded by: Nick Stepovich

Member of the Alaska House of Representatives from the 31st district
- In office January 19, 1999 – January 20, 2003
- Preceded by: Pete Kelly
- Succeeded by: (redistricting)

Member of the Fairbanks City Council
- In office October 1995 – October 1998

Personal details
- Born: September 30, 1950 (age 76) Bremerton, Washington, U.S.
- Party: Republican
- Spouse: Patricia "Jinx" Whitaker
- Children: Victoria, Christine, Jennifer, Wendy

Norris J. "Jim" Whitaker (born September 30, 1950) is an American politician of the Republican Party who served as mayor of Fairbanks North Star Borough, Alaska, from 2003 to 2009. Prior to his mayoral term, Whitaker served in the Alaska House of Representatives from 1999 to 2003. In October 2003 he was elected borough mayor, defeating the incumbent, fellow Republican Rhonda Boyles. Whitaker was reelected in 2006 with over 77% of the vote. As mayor, Whitaker was known for supporting spending on quality of life services such as parks and recreation, as well as spearheading a campaign to prevent a drastic reduction in the operations of Eielson Air Force Base due to federal budget cuts.

Whitaker endorsed Democrat Barack Obama in the 2008 United States presidential election and spoke during the second day of the 2008 Democratic National Convention in Denver, Colorado. Many Alaska Republicans expressed ill feelings about the decision, with one former state senator accusing him of being a Republican In Name Only. Whitaker's endorsement of Obama was notable as the mayor of the second-largest metropolitan area in Alaska, the home state of 2008 Republican vice-presidential candidate Sarah Palin, who was nominated by John McCain after the Democratic convention.

In 2009, Whitaker endorsed Democrat Luke Hopkins to be his successor as mayor. Hopkins won the election in a runoff on November 3 and succeeded Whitaker on November 16, 2009.

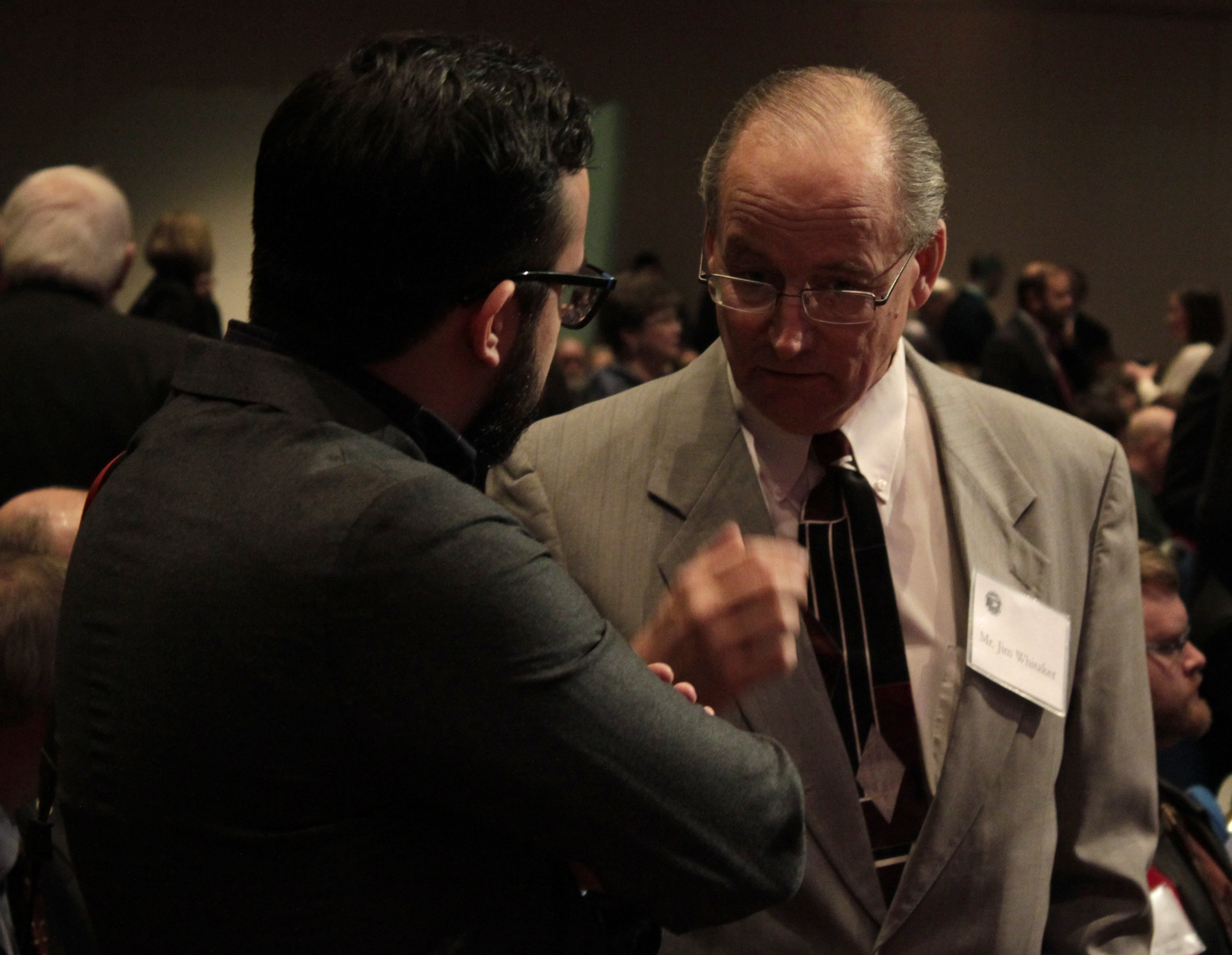
Whitaker speaks with the Fairbanks Daily News-Miner's political reporter prior to Bill Walker's inauguration in December 2014.

In 2014, Whitaker was selected to be Governor Bill Walker's Chief of Staff.
