= Stepovich =

Stepovich is a surname. Notable people with the surname include:

- Mike Stepovich (1919–2014), American lawyer and politician
- Nick Stepovich (born 1957), American politician and businessman
