= Jay Ramras =

American politician (born 1964)

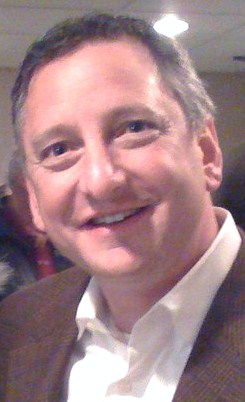
- Ramras in 2008

Member of the Alaska House of Representatives from the 10th district
- In office January 10, 2005 – January 16, 2011
- Preceded by: Nick Stepovich
- Succeeded by: Steve M. Thompson

Personal details
- Born: July 31, 1964 (age 62) Fairbanks, Alaska, U.S.
- Party: Republican
- Education: Syracuse University
- Profession: Hotelier and restaurateur

Jay B. Ramras (born July 31, 1964) is an American businessman and politician. Ramras was a Republican member of the Alaska House of Representatives, being elected to the 10th District in 2004, and served three terms. He served as Chair of the Education Committee, Vice-Chair of the State Affairs Committee, and is a member of the Health & Social Services Committee and the Resources Committee. He also served on the Commerce, Community & Economic Development, Education & Early Development, Environmental Conservation, and Law Finance Subcommittees, for the 26th Legislature.

In 2010, Ramras ran for lieutenant governor, but lost the Republican primary to Mead Treadwell.

Ramras is also a hotel and restaurant owner. Beginning in 1986 with a small restaurant called Jaybird's Wingworld, located in a strip mall just outside downtown Fairbanks, he became successful enough to expand his business footprint throughout the Fairbanks area. In 1993, he purchased the Food Factory, located in the nearby Bentley Mall, from "Big Bob" Grocott, who established the restaurant in 1980. Ramras sold the Food Factory in 2010. He also later purchased Pike's Landing, near Fairbanks International Airport. In 2000, Ramras, along with partners, opened Pike's Waterfront Lodge next door to Pike's Landing. He has featured himself in numerous television commercials for his businesses over the years. In his commercials for the hotel, he has often espoused his political philosophy and positions.

== Personal life ==
Jay Ramras was born in Fairbanks, Alaska, the elder of two sons of Dan and Dorothy Ramras. His father moved to Fairbanks from Brooklyn in 1947. He graduated from Lathrop High School in 1981, and earned a Bachelor of Arts in American History from the Syracuse University in 1984.

Ramras has been a lifelong resident of Fairbanks, with two exceptions. He spent a year living in the small Alaska Native community of Allakaket during his childhood. In 1997, he briefly moved to New York City, seeking (ultimately unsuccessfully) to find a Jewish wife willing to move to Alaska with him, becoming a minor national celebrity in the process.
