= Kelly Wolf =

American politician

Member of the Kenai Peninsula Borough Assembly, District 1
- In office December 1, 2012 – December 1, 2015
- Preceded by: Gary Knopp
- Succeeded by: Gary Knopp

Member of the Alaska House of Representatives from the 33rd district
- In office January 21, 2003 – January 10, 2005
- Preceded by: Hugh Fate
- Succeeded by: Kurt Olson

Personal details
- Born: August 3, 1961 (age 65) Longview, Washington, United States
- Party: Republican
- Other political affiliations: Independent (2008)

Kelly J. Wolf (born August 3, 1961) is an American politician from the state of Alaska. He served in the Alaska House of Representatives from 2003 until 2005.

== Biography ==
Wolf was born in 1961 in Longview, Washington, moving to Alaska in 1975, graduating from Kenai Central High School in 1979. He worked as a contractor and carpenter, and was first elected to the House of Representatives in 2002 as a Republican, defeating Hal Smalley. Wolf did not run for reelection in 2004, but ran in 2008 as an independent, placing third.

Wolf was elected to the Kenai Peninsula Borough Assembly in 2012, and was subject to an unsuccessful recall effort in January 2015, before being defeated in his 2015 bid for reelection. He also unsuccessfully ran for lieutenant governor in 2014, and attempted a comeback to the House in 2016.

== Personal life ==
Wolf and his wife, Elvira, have 4 children: Ryan, Joshua, Justin, and Salena.

== Political positions ==
Wolf is opposed to gun control, abortion, and same-sex marriage. Elaborating on his pro-life views, he stated in his 2014 declaration of candidacy for Lieutenant Governor, "I cannot support abortion, because if did [sic] my oldest son who was born with Down’s Syndrome may not be here and to me and my family this would have been a tragedy."

== Electoral history ==
Alaska House District 33 election, 2002
Party	Candidate	Votes	%
Republican	Kelly Wolf	3,056	52.50
Democratic	Harold Smalley	2,742	47.11
Other	Write-ins	23	0.40
Total votes		5,821	100.00

Kenai Peninsula Borough Assembly District 1 election, 2006
Party	Candidate	Votes	%
Nonpartisan	Gary Knopp	733	63.46
Nonpartisan	Kelly Wolf	412	35.67
Other	Write-ins	10	0.87
Total votes		1,155	100.00

Alaska House District 33 election, 2008
Party	Candidate	Votes	%
Republican	Kurt Olson	5,461	67.24
Democratic	Richard A. Waisanen	1,633	20.11
Independent	Kelly Wolf	1,013	12.47
Other	Write-ins	15	0.19
Total votes		8,122	100.00

Kenai Peninsula Borough Assembly District 1 election, 2012
Party	Candidate	Votes	%
Nonpartisan	Kelly Wolf	232	50.22
Nonpartisan	Michael Winegarden	225	48.70
Other	Write-ins	5	1.08
Total votes		462	100.00

Alaska lieutenant gubernatorial Republican primary, 2014
Party	Candidate	Votes	%
Republican	Dan Sullivan	74,758	70.70
Republican	Kelly Wolf	30,985	29.30
Total votes		105,743	100

Kenai Peninsula Borough Assembly District 1 election, 2015
Party	Candidate	Votes	%
Nonpartisan	Gary Knopp	269	30.26
Nonpartisan	David C. Wartinbee	265	29.81
Nonpartisan	Kelly Wolf	180	20.25
Nonpartisan	Robin Davis	172	19.35
Other	Write-ins	3	0.34
Total votes		889	100.00

Alaska House District 30 Republican primary, 2016
Party	Candidate	Votes	%
Republican	Gary Knopp	887	43.14
Republican	Rick R. Koch	581	28.26
Republican	Keith D. Baxter	313	15.22
Republican	Kelly Wolf	275	13.38
Total votes		2,056	100.00
