= Mike Navarre =

American businessman and politician

Mayor of Kenai Peninsula Borough
- In office December 1, 2011 – November 5, 2017
- Preceded by: Dave Carey
- Succeeded by: Charlie Pierce
- In office December 1, 1996 – December 1, 1999
- Preceded by: Donald E. Gilman
- Succeeded by: Dale Bagley

Member of the Alaska House of Representatives from the 5A (later 9th) district
- In office January 3, 1985 – December 1, 1996
- Preceded by: Hugh Malone
- Succeeded by: Mark Hodgins

Personal details
- Born: June 9, 1956 (age 70) Lansing, Michigan
- Party: Democratic
- Education: Eastern Washington University

Mike Navarre (born June 9, 1956) is an American businessman and politician who formerly served as mayor of Alaska's Kenai Peninsula Borough and as a member of the Alaska House of Representatives.

== Biography ==
Mike Navarre was born on June 9, 1956, in Lansing, Michigan, one of eleven children (seven sons and four daughters) of George A. Navarre (1923–2009) and his wife Rose (née Doogan). The family moved to Kenai, Alaska, when he was an infant, where they established themselves in the business community. At first, the family opened up a grocery store, then branched out into an auto service business and fast food franchising, both of which currently operate locations across Alaska. He dropped out of college in the 1970s and moved to Fairbanks, Alaska, moving back to Kenai in 1978. Navarre later returned to college and graduated with a Bachelor of Arts in Government from Eastern Washington University in 1983.

Navarre was first elected to the state House as a Democrat in 1984, and served until 1996, representing District 5 (holding Seat A) from 1985 to 1993 and District 9 from 1993 to 1996. He chaired the House Finance Committee for several years and was Majority Leader from 1989 until 1991. In 1996, Navarre successfully ran for mayor of Kenai Peninsula Borough, before being defeated by Dale Bagley in 1999. He once again ran in 2011, and was reelected in 2014. During his first term as mayor, he served as president of the Alaska Conference of Mayors.

In October 2017, while the election to replace Navarre had gone to a runoff, he was appointed by Bill Walker, then-governor of Alaska, to head the Alaska Department of Commerce, Community and Economic Development. The appointment came about when the department's commissioner Chris Hladick was appointed by Scott Pruitt, the administrator of the Environmental Protection Agency, to become the agency's Region 10 director. His successor Charlie Pierce took office as mayor on November 5; Navarre spent several days coordinating the transition with Pierce before starting his new job.

Navarre serves on the Kenai Chamber of Commerce, North Peninsula Chamber of Commerce, and Peninsula Petroleum Club. He is also a member of the Municipal Advisory Gas Project Review Board, as well as the board of the Rasmuson Foundation.

== Electoral history ==
Alaska House District 5A open primary, 1984
Party	Candidate	Votes	%
Republican	Merrill Sikorski	2,208	37.77
Republican	Betty Glick	1,433	24.51
Democratic	Mike Navarre	1,445	24.72
Libertarian	John C. Davis	760	13.00
Total votes		5,846	100.00

Alaska House District 5A election, 1984
Party	Candidate	Votes	%
Democratic	Mike Navarre	4,437	39.45
Republican	Merrill Sikorski	4,358	38.75
Libertarian	John C. Davis	2,442	21.71
Other	Write-ins	11	0.10
Total votes		11,248	100.00

Alaska House District 5A election, 1986
Party	Candidate	Votes	%
Democratic	Mike Navarre	6,786	63.67
Republican	Thomas Wagoner	3,842	36.05
Other	Write-ins	30	0.28
Total votes		10,658	100.00

Alaska House District 5A election, 1988
Party	Candidate	Votes	%
Democratic	Mike Navarre	6,382	58.59
Republican	Mike King	4,504	41.35
Other	Write-ins	6	0.06
Total votes		10,892	100.00

Alaska House District 5A election, 1990
Party	Candidate	Votes	%
Democratic	Mike Navarre	5,803	54.82
Republican	Ron Sartain	4,270	40.34
Nonpartisan	Larry Slone	494	4.67
Other	Write-ins	18	0.17
Total votes		10,585	100.00

Alaska House District 9 election, 1992
Party	Candidate	Votes	%
Democratic	Mike Navarre	2,561	45.90
Republican	Mark Hodgins	2,343	42.00
Nonpartisan	Gary Superman	672	12.05
Other	Write-ins	3	0.05
Total votes		5,579	100.00

Alaska House District 9 election, 1994
Party	Candidate	Votes	%
Democratic	Mike Navarre	2,079	46.07
Republican	Mark Hodgins	1,965	43.54
Nonpartisan	Gary Superman	465	10.30
Other	Write-ins	4	0.09
Total votes		4,513	100.00

Kenai Peninsula Borough mayoral election, 1996
Party	Candidate	Votes	%
Nonpartisan	Mike Navarre	4,833	54.25
Nonpartisan	Betty Glick	2,546	28.58
Nonpartisan	Gary Superman	1,280	14.37
Nonpartisan	Jesse Wilson	143	1.61
Nonpartisan	Ed Martin	94	1.06
Other	Write-ins	13	0.15
Total votes		8,909	100.00

Kenai Peninsula Borough mayoral election, 1999
Party	Candidate	Votes	%
Nonpartisan	Mike Navarre	3,890	44.90
Nonpartisan	Dale Bagley	2,626	30.31
Nonpartisan	Joe Arness	1,302	15.03
Nonpartisan	Joseph A. Ross	632	7.30
Nonpartisan	Daniel E. Skipwith	192	2.22
Other	Write-ins	22	0.25
Total votes		8,664	100.00

Kenai Peninsula Borough mayoral election runoff, 1999
Party	Candidate	Votes	%
Nonpartisan	Dale Bagley	4,183	52.33
Nonpartisan	Mike Navarre	3,810	47.67
Total votes		7,993	100.00

Kenai Peninsula Borough mayoral election, 2011
Party	Candidate	Votes	%
Nonpartisan	Mike Navarre	3,932	38.83
Nonpartisan	Fred Sturman	2,312	22.83
Nonpartisan	Dale Bagley	1,657	16.36
Nonpartisan	Debbie Brown	1,261	12.45
Nonpartisan	Gary Superman	759	7.50
Nonpartisan	Tim O'Brien	177	1.75
Other	Write-ins	28	0.28
Total votes		10,126	100.00

Kenai Peninsula Borough mayoral election runoff, 2011
Party	Candidate	Votes	%
Nonpartisan	Mike Navarre	5,054	52.74
Nonpartisan	Fred Sturman	4,529	47.26
Total votes		9,583	100.00

Kenai Peninsula Borough mayoral election, 2014
Party	Candidate	Votes	%
Nonpartisan	Mike Navarre	5,908	54.37
Nonpartisan	Thomas R. Bearup	3,899	35.88
Nonpartisan	Carrol J. Martin	1,003	9.23
Other	Write-ins	56	0.52
Total votes		10,866	100.00
