= Smalley (surname) =

Smalley is a surname. Notable people with the surname include:

- Adam Smalley, British racing driver
- Beryl Smalley, historian
- Bill Smalley, British footballer
- Dave Smalley, musician
- Dave Smalley (Cleveland), musician
- David Allen Smalley (1809–1877), American judge and politician
- Denis Smalley, musician
- Eugene Byron Smalley, plant pathologist
- Gary Smalley, counselor
- Hal Smalley, politician
- Howard Smalley (born 1942), New Zealand cricketer
- Kyle E. Smalley, astronomer
- Luke Smalley (1955–2009), American photographer
- Phillips Smalley, film director
- Richard Smalley (1943–2005), Nobel prize in chemistry
- Roger Smalley (1943–2015), musician
- Roy Smalley Jr., baseball player
- Roy Smalley III, baseball player
- Sherman E. Smalley (1866–1958), American politician and jurist
- Stephen Smalley (1931–2024), British Anglican priest
- Tom Smalley (1912–1984), England footballer
- Will Smalley, American baseball player
- William A. Smalley (1923–1997), linguist
- William E. Smalley, American bishop

== Fictional ==
- Stuart Smalley, fictional character
