= Mae Tischer =

American politician

Mae Tischer (October 16, 1928 – January 18, 2018) was an American politician.

Tischer was born in Minnesota. In 1962, Tischer moved to Alaska with her family and lived in a homestead at Goose Creek for three years. In 1965, she moved again to Anchorage, Alaska, so that her children could attend highschool. She met "Ticsh" Tisher on the Alcan Highway in 1965, whom she was married to until his death in a car crash in 1972.

Tischer served as district director for the Alaska Muscular Dystrophy Association in Anchorage, Alaska. In 1983 and 1984, Tischer served in the Alaska House of Representatives and was a Republican. Tischer died at the Anchorage Pioneer House in Anchorage, Alaska on January 18, 2018.

== Notes ==
Alaska House of Representatives
Preceded by District created	Member of the Alaska House of Representatives from the 11-B district 1983–1985	Succeeded by Max Gruenberg
