= Max Gruenberg =

American politician (1943–2016)

Member of the Alaska House of Representatives from the 14th district
- In office January 20, 2003 – February 14, 2016
- Preceded by: Brian Porter
- Succeeded by: Ivy Spohnholz

Member of the Alaska House of Representatives from the 11^{th-B} district
- In office 1985 – January 18, 1993 Serving with Dave Donley (1986–1990); Roger Jenkins (1984–1986)
- Preceded by: Mae Tischer
- Succeeded by: District Abolished

Personal details
- Born: Max Foorman Gruenberg, Jr. September 25, 1943 San Francisco, California, U.S.
- Died: February 14, 2016 (aged 72) Juneau, Alaska, U.S.
- Party: Democratic
- Spouse: Kayla Epstein
- Education: Stanford University, University of California
- Profession: Attorney

Max Foorman Gruenberg, Jr. (September 25, 1943 – February 14, 2016) was an American politician, a Democratic member of the Alaska House of Representatives, representing the 14th District since 2003. He previously served from 1985 through 1993. On October 13, 2009, he became the senior member of the House after the death of Richard Foster of Nome.

Gruenberg served in the United States Navy during the Vietnam War. He died at home on February 14, 2016 in Juneau after an evening with his friends and wife at their residence. He had previously had heart attacks. He was 72 years old.

== Life and education ==
Max F. Gruenberg Jr. was born in San Francisco to Dorothy Lilienthal Gruenberg and Max Gruenberg, Sr. in 1943 as their only son. Growing up, Gruenberg participated in Boy Scouts and became an Eagle Scout. He graduated from Acalanes High School in Lafayette, California northeast of Oakland in 1961 and went to Stanford University from 1961-1965, where he earned his B.A. in political science.

After Gruenberg graduated from Stanford University he attended UCLA School of Law from 1967 to 1970. On June 5, 1994, Gruenberg married his third wife, Kayla Epstein. Gruenberg had two sons named Bruce and Daniel. Outside of politics, Gruenberg participated in and was a member of the Fairview Lions Club from 1978 to 2016, Alaska Common Ground from 2001 to 2016, a board member in the American Academy of Matrimonial Lawyers from 1981 to 2016, and in the Veterans of Foreign Wars from 1993 to 2016. He was a family lawyer from 1974 to 2005 participating in court cases including Flores v. Flores in 1979 and Hilliker v. Hilliker in 1988, appearing before the Alaska Supreme Court.

== Military career ==
Max Gruenberg and his father served in different branches within the United States military. Max served in the Navy during the Vietnam War; his father was in the U.S. Army during World War II. Max's mother later married Jacques Schnier, an artist who also served in World War II. After graduating from Stanford University, Max Gruenberg joined the Navy from 1966-1967 as a lieutenant on a transport ship called the U.S.S. Whitfield, where he was awarded a 3 battle stars Vietnam Service Medal.

== Political career ==
In 1970, Max Gruenberg moved to Alaska and began his political life as an Alaskan politician. In 1985, he served in the House of Representative, representing East Anchorage House District 16. He remained in office until 1993, when he took a 10 year break from politics. He returned to politics in 2002 and in 2003, where he served as House of Representative until his death in 2016. During Gruenberg's early years in politics, he helped create the Alaska Law Review and worked alongside Republican Senator Ted Stevens as Steven's top legislative aide in Washington D.C. In 1970-1971, Gruenberg was also a law clerk for Justice Roger Connor in the Alaska Supreme Court.

=== Elections for Alaska House of Representatives ===
District 16 election in 2014
Party	Candidate	Vote Count
Democratic	Max F. Gruenberg, Jr.	3,253
Republican	Don Hadley	2,745

District 14 election in 2012
Party	Candidate	Vote Count
Democratic	Max F. Gruenberg, Jr.	3,391
Republican	Don Hadley	2,883

District 20 election in 2010
Party	Candidate	Vote Count
Democratic	Max F. Gruenberg, Jr.	2,065
Liberal	Scott A. Kohlhaas	918

District 20 election in 2008
Party	Candidate	Vote Count
Democratic	Max F. Gruenberg, Jr.	3,361
Liberal	Scott Kohlhaus	812

=== Alaska committees ===
Alaska Committees Assignment Rep. Gruenberg Jr. Held
2015	2013-2014	2011-2012	2009-2010
Judiciary	Judiciary	Judiciary	Judiciary
State Affairs	Legislative Council	State Affairs	State Affairs
Military & Veterans' Affairs	Military & Veterans' Affairs	Transportation	Transportation
	Rules	Rules	

=== Legislative bills ===
Bills Sponsored by Rep. Gruenberg Jr.
Bill Number	Name of Bill
AK HB6	Priv Employer Voluntary Vet Preference
AK HB8	Powers of Attorney
AK HB18	Expand Medicaid Coverage
AK SB23	Opioid Old Drugs: Dispensing; Immunity
AK HB27	Dhss Duties; cina; Foster Care; Adoption
AK HB35	March 27: Great Alaska Earthquake Day
AK HB44	Sex Abuse/ assault/ dating Viol Prev. Progs
AK HB60	Military: Sexual Assault
AK HB61	Military Meritorious Award License Plates
AK HB117	Sexual Assault Examination Kits
AK HB 130	Naming State Library & Museum
AK HB142	Establish Elders' Day
AK HB147	Animals: Protection/release/custody
AK HB154	Civil Legal Services Fun
AK HB175	Establish Military Family Day
AK HB207	Antitrust Actions & Penalties
AK HB215	New Drugs For The Terminally Ill
AK HB223	Session Limit
AK HB226	Extended Alaska Commission on Aging
AK HB 255	Reading or Typing Messages While Driving
Ak HCR16	Ways And Means: Uniform Rules
AK HJR6	Federal Contamination of Ancsa Lands
AK HJR22	Stewart-hyder Border Hours

Honorary titles
Preceded by Richard Foster	Senior member of the Alaska House of Representatives; 2009–2016	Succeeded by Mike Chenault
