= Hal Smalley =

American politician

Member of the Alaska House of Representatives from the 9th district
- In office January 3, 1999 – January 3, 2001
- Preceded by: Mark Hodgins
- Succeeded by: Mike Chenault

Member of the Kenai Peninsula Borough Assembly, District 2
- In office October 2008 – October 2014
- Preceded by: Margaret Gilman
- Succeeded by: Blaine D. Gilman

Member of the Kenai City Council
- In office October 2007 – October 2010
- In office October 1988 – January 1999

Personal details
- Born: November 22, 1946 (age 79) Hood River, Oregon, United States
- Party: Democratic
- Education: Clatsop Community College; Western Oregon University

Harold V. Smalley (born November 22, 1946) is an American politician who served one term in the Alaska House of Representatives.

== Biography ==
Smalley was born in 1946 in Hood River, Oregon. He graduated from Astoria High School in 1965, and attended Clatsop Community College from 1965 until 1967. He later transferred to the Oregon College of Education (now known as Western Oregon University), graduating in 1969.

In 1970, Smalley moved to Napakiak, Alaska, a small community of mostly Yup'ik Alaska Natives, where he taught at the Napakiak Bureau of Indian Affairs Day School. In 1972, Smalley moved to nearby Kwigillingok, again teaching with the Bureau of Indian Affairs. He moved to Kenai in 1974, serving as Director of Student Affairs of the Kenai Native Association, and later teaching with the Kenai Peninsula School District. Smalley was President of the Kenai Peninsula Education Association from 1983 until 1997, and also worked as a commercial fisherman. He serves on the Kenai and Soldotna Chamber of Commerce.

Smalley served on the Kenai City Council from 1988 until 1999, and ran for the House from the 9th district in 1998, defeating one-term incumbent Republican Mark Hodgins by 231 votes. In 2000, he ran for reelection and was defeated by Mike Chenault. Smalley unsuccessfully ran again from the 33rd district in 2002, losing to Kelly Wolf, and again in 2004, losing to Kurt Olson. Following his service in the House, Smalley served on the Kenai Peninsula Borough Assembly from 2008 until 2014 and the Kenai City Council from 2007 until 2010. He unsuccessfully ran for Mayor of Kenai in 2016 and unsuccessfully applied for a vacant seat on the Borough Assembly in February 2017.

== Personal life ==
Smalley and his wife, Arleen Susan Smalley, have 2 children: Jeanine, Kristopher, and Brian.

== Electoral history ==
Alaska House District 9 election, 1998
| Party | Candidate | Votes | % |
|---|---|---|---|
| Democratic | Harold Smalley | 2,652 | 51.95 |
| Republican | Mark Hodgins | 2,421 | 47.42 |
| Other | Write-ins | 32 | 0.63 |
| Total votes | | 5,105 | 100.00 |

Alaska House District 9 election, 2000
| Party | Candidate | Votes | % |
|---|---|---|---|
| Republican | Mike Chenault | 3,256 | 51.09 |
| Democratic | Harold Smalley | 2,607 | 41.04 |
| Republican Moderate | James R. Price | 493 | 7.76 |
| Other | Write-ins | 7 | 0.11 |
| Total votes | | 6,363 | 100.00 |

Alaska House District 33 election, 2002
| Party | Candidate | Votes | % |
|---|---|---|---|
| Republican | Kelly Wolf | 3,056 | 52.50 |
| Democratic | Harold Smalley | 2,742 | 47.11 |
| Other | Write-ins | 23 | 0.40 |
| Total votes | | 5,821 | 100.00 |

Alaska House District 33 election, 2004
| Party | Candidate | Votes | % |
|---|---|---|---|
| Republican | Kurt Olson | 4,348 | 58.03 |
| Democratic | Harold Smalley | 3,126 | 41.72 |
| Other | Write-ins | 19 | 0.25 |
| Total votes | | 7,493 | 100.00 |

Kenai City Council election, 2007
| Party | Candidate | Votes | % |
|---|---|---|---|
| Nonpartisan | Harold Smalley | 713 | 42.44 |
| Nonpartisan | Barry Eldridge | 486 | 28.93 |
| Nonpartisan | Joe Moore | 470 | 27.98 |
| Other | Write-ins | 11 | 0.65 |
| Total votes | | 1,680 | 100.00 |

Kenai Peninsula Borough Assembly District 2 election, 2008
| Party | Candidate | Votes | % |
|---|---|---|---|
| Nonpartisan | Harold Smalley | 724 | 67.16 |
| Nonpartisan | Malcolm G. McBride | 352 | 32.65 |
| Other | Write-ins | 2 | 0.19 |
| Total votes | | 1,078 | 100.00 |

Kenai City Council election, 2010
| Party | Candidate | Votes | % |
|---|---|---|---|
| Nonpartisan | Terry Bookey | 643 | 30.39 |
| Nonpartisan | Brian Gabriel | 586 | 27.69 |
| Nonpartisan | Harold Smalley | 548 | 25.90 |
| Nonpartisan | Barry Eldridge | 330 | 15.60 |
| Other | Write-ins | 9 | 0.43 |
| Total votes | | 2,116 | 100.00 |

Kenai Peninsula Borough Assembly District 2 election, 2011
| Party | Candidate | Votes | % |
|---|---|---|---|
| Nonpartisan | Harold Smalley | 688 | 95.16 |
| Other | Write-ins | 35 | 4.84 |
| Total votes | | 723 | 100.00 |

Kenai Peninsula Borough Assembly District 2 election, 2012
| Party | Candidate | Votes | % |
|---|---|---|---|
| Nonpartisan | Harold Smalley | 449 | 65.64 |
| Nonpartisan | Chris Hutchison | 234 | 34.21 |
| Other | Write-ins | 1 | 0.15 |
| Total votes | | 684 | 100.00 |

Kenai mayoral election, 2016
| Party | Candidate | Votes | % |
|---|---|---|---|
| Nonpartisan | Brian Gabriel | 577 | 53.08 |
| Nonpartisan | Harold Smalley | 502 | 46.18 |
| Other | Write-ins | 8 | 0.74 |
| Total votes | | 1,087 | 100.00 |
