= Eric Feige =

American politician

Member of the Alaska House of Representatives from the 6th district
- In office January 18, 2013 – January 20, 2015
- Preceded by: Alan Dick
- Succeeded by: Jim Colver

Member of the Alaska House of Representatives from the 12th district
- In office 2011–2013
- Preceded by: John Harris
- Succeeded by: Dan Saddler

Personal details
- Born: April 10, 1961 (age 65) Meriden, Connecticut, U.S.
- Party: Republican
- Education: United States Military Academy; Pennsylvania State University
- Website: feige4house.org

Military service
- Branch/service: United States Army
- Years of service: 1983–1992
- Rank: Captain

Eric A. Feige (born April 10, 1961, in Meriden, Connecticut) is an American politician and a Republican member of the Alaska House of Representatives from 2013 to 2015, representing District 6. Feige consecutively served from 2011 until 2013 while it was the District 12 seat.

== Education ==
Feige earned his BS from the United States Military Academy and his PA and MS from Pennsylvania State University.

== Elections ==
- In 2012 Feige was redistricted to District 6, while Republican Representative Alan Dick was redistricted to District 38. Feige won the District 6 August 28, 2012 Republican Primary with 1,373 votes (53.34%), and won the November 6, 2012 General election with 4,879 votes (71.77%) against Democratic nominee Jamey Duhamel.
- 2010 When Republican Representative and Speaker of the House John Harris retired and left the District 12 seat open, Feige won the three-way August 24, 2010 Republican Primary by 7 votes, with 812 votes (33.65%), and won the November 2, 2010 General election with 3,166 votes (62.37%) against Democratic nominee Bert Cottle.
