= Jim Colver =

American politician

Member of the Alaska House of Representatives from the 9th district
- In office January 20, 2015 – January 2017
- Preceded by: Eric Feige
- Succeeded by: George Rauscher

Member of the Matanuska-Susitna Borough Assembly
- In office 2009–2015

Personal details
- Born: 1958 (age 67–68) Anchorage, Territory of Alaska
- Party: Republican
- Spouse: Marie-Louise
- Children: Hannah, Julia, and Calum
- Education: University of Alaska Anchorage (B.A.)
- Occupation: Land surveyor
- Website: Legislative website

James C. Colver (born 1958) is an American politician from Alaska. A Republican, he is a former member of the Alaska House of Representatives, serving House District 9 from 2015 through 2016. He is also a former assemblyman for the Matanuska-Susitna Borough.

Colver lost his bid for reelection in 2016 during the Republican primary. Colver mounted a successful primary challenge to incumbent Representative Eric Feige in 2014; the Chickaloon Republican finished third in the three-way primary election on August 19. He went on to defeat Palmer Democrat Mabel Wimmer and Constitution Party nominee Pam Goode of Delta Junction in the general election, finishing on top in another three-way contest.

== Personal life ==
Jim Colver was born in Anchorage, Territory of Alaska to Warren and Della Colver. His father served as attorney general of Alaska in the early years of Alaska's statehood under governor William A. Egan. He lives in the Hatcher Pass area, near Palmer.

Colver joined the Republican Party in 2012. He acknowledged during his 2014 campaign that he previously supported several Democratic candidates, including Mark Begich in the 2008 U.S. Senate election. After graduating from West Anchorage High School, Jim Colver continued onto receive his associate degree in Surveying Technology from the University of Anchorage, Alaska. Following his A.S., he went on to receive his bachelor's degree in Business Management and Law from the University of Anchorage, Alaska.
