= Gary Knopp =

American politician (1957–2020)

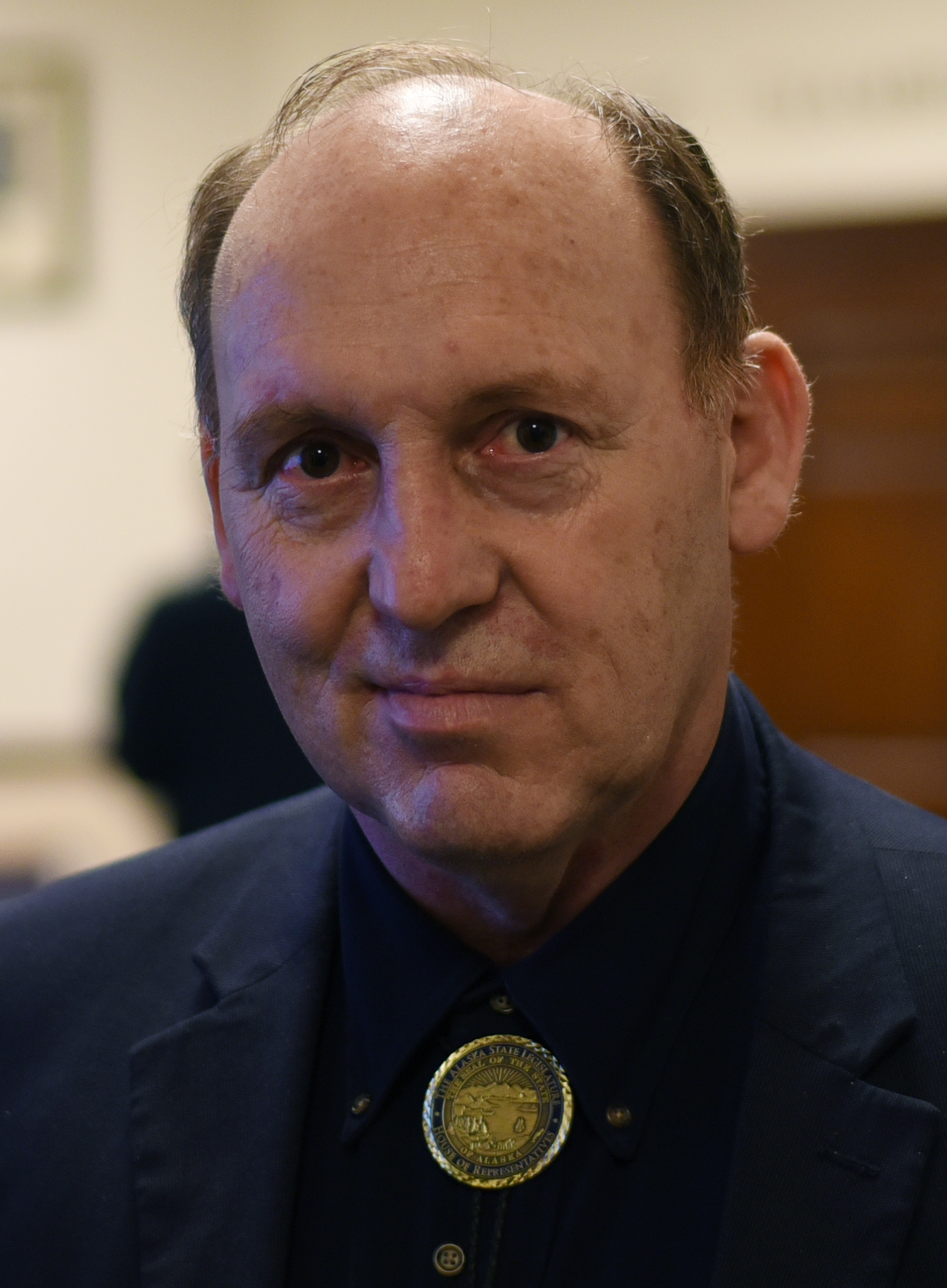

Member of the Alaska House of Representatives from the 30th district
- In office January 17, 2017 – July 31, 2020
- Preceded by: Kurt Olson
- Succeeded by: Ron Gillham

Member of the Kenai Peninsula Borough Assembly, District 1
- In office December 1, 2015 – January 3, 2017
- Preceded by: Kelly Wolf
- Succeeded by: Brent Hibbert
- In office December 1, 2006 – December 1, 2012
- Preceded by: Dan Chay
- Succeeded by: Kelly Wolf

Personal details
- Born: Gary Allan Knopp; July 14, 1957 Whitefish, Montana, U.S.
- Died: July 31, 2020 (aged 63) Soldotna, Alaska, U.S.
- Party: Republican

Gary Allan Knopp (July 14, 1957 – July 31, 2020) was an American politician who served in the Alaska House of Representatives from the 30th district as a member of the Republican Party.

== Early life ==
Knopp was born on July 14, 1957, in Whitefish, Montana. In 1979, he moved to Alaska.

== Career ==
Knopp was elected to the Kenai Peninsula Borough Assembly in Alaska in 2006, serving until 2012 (including two years as assembly president), when he retired in order to unsuccessfully run for the state house. Knopp won a third term on the Assembly in 2015, and successfully ran for the House in 2016.

=== Alaska House of Representatives ===
Knopp resigned from the Assembly on January 3, 2017, and was sworn in as a representative later that month.

In December 2018, Knopp left the Republican caucus in the House of Representatives to push for a bipartisan coalition. On May 17, 2019, he was censured by the Alaska Republican Party State Central Committee due to his role in forming a majority coalition in the House of Representatives with members of the Alaska Democratic Party.

During the 30th session of the Alaska House of Representatives, from 2017 to 2019, Knopp served on the Administration, University of Alaska, Commerce, Community and Economic Development, Labor and Workforce Development, Revenue, State Affairs, Arctic Policy, Economic Development and Tourism, and Labor and Commerce committees. During the 31st session, from 2019 to 2020, he served as the chairman of the Natural Resources, and Labor and Workforce Development committees and as a member on the Finance committee.

== Personal life ==
Knopp was married to Helen. He died on July 31, 2020, when his private Piper PA-12 Super Cruiser aircraft collided with a deHavilland DHC-2 Beaver owned by High Adventure Air Charter, near Soldotna, Alaska. The other plane's six occupants also died in the crash. A National Transportation Safety Board (NTSB) investigation indicated that Knopp had hit the Beaver at the aft end of the fuselage, that he had taken off shortly after the Beaver, that his aircraft was not properly registered, and that Knopp had been denied a medical certificate in 2012 due to vision problems.

== Electoral history ==
Kenai Peninsula Borough Assembly District 1 election, 2006
Party	Candidate	Votes	%
Nonpartisan	Gary Knopp	733	63.46
Nonpartisan	Kelly Wolf	412	35.67
Other	Write-ins	10	0.87
Total votes		1,155	100.00

Kenai Peninsula Borough Assembly District 1 election, 2009
Party	Candidate	Votes	%
Nonpartisan	Gary Knopp	592	95.18
Other	Write-ins	30	4.82
Total votes		622	100.00

Alaska House District 29 Republican primary, 2012
Party	Candidate	Votes	%
Republican	Kurt Olson	1,679	56.10
Republican	Gary Knopp	1,314	43.90
Total votes		2,993	100.00

Kenai Peninsula Borough Assembly District 1 election, 2015
Party	Candidate	Votes	%
Nonpartisan	Gary Knopp	269	30.26
Nonpartisan	David C. Wartinbee	265	29.81
Nonpartisan	Kelly Wolf	180	20.25
Nonpartisan	Robin Davis	172	19.35
Other	Write-ins	3	0.34
Total votes		889	100.00

Alaska House District 30 Republican primary, 2016
Party	Candidate	Votes	%
Republican	Gary Knopp	887	43.14
Republican	Rick R. Koch	581	28.26
Republican	Keith D. Baxter	313	15.22
Republican	Kelly Wolf	275	13.38
Total votes		2,056	100.00

Alaska House District 30 election, 2016
Party	Candidate	Votes	%
Republican	Gary Knopp	5,346	65.29
Democratic	Shauna L. Thornton	1,868	22.81
Constitution	J. R. Myers	473	5.78
Nonpartisan	Daniel L. Lynch	473	5.78
Other	Write-ins	28	0.34
Total votes		8,188	100.00

Alaska House District 30 election, 2018
Party	Candidate	Votes	%
Republican	Gary Knopp	6,187	93.83
Other	Write-ins	407	6.17
Total votes		6,594	100.00
