= Mark Hodgins =

American politician

Member of the Alaska House of Representatives from the 9th district
- In office January 3, 1997 – January 3, 1999
- Preceded by: Mike Navarre
- Succeeded by: Harold Smalley

Member of the Kenai Peninsula Borough Assembly
- In office 1987–1992

Personal details
- Born: September 18, 1947 (age 79) Los Angeles, California, U.S.
- Party: Republican
- Education: University of Alaska Fairbanks

Mark D. Hodgins (born September 18, 1947) is an American politician who served one term in the Alaska House of Representatives.

== Biography ==
Hodgins was born in Los Angeles in 1947. He graduated from Cascade High School in Everett, Washington in 1965 and served in the Alaska National Guard from 1966 until 1972. Hodgins later studied at the University of Alaska and at Kenai Peninsula Community College.

Hodgins served in the Kenai Peninsula Borough Assembly from 1987 until 1992. He unsuccessfully ran for the House in 1992 and 1994, both times losing to Mike Navarre, but won in 1996 when Navarre decided to retire. Hodgins was defeated in his 1998 bid for reelection and later moved to North Bend, Oregon, where he is a co-owner of Dent Breakaway Industries. Hodgins unsuccessfully ran for selection to the Coos County Board of Commissioners in May 2011, to replace deceased Commissioner Nikki Whitty.

== Personal life ==
Hodgins and his wife, Audrey, have 2 children: Deni and Andrea.

== Electoral history ==
Alaska House District 9 election, 1992
Party	Candidate	Votes	%
Democratic	Mike Navarre	2,561	45.90
Republican	Mark Hodgins	2,343	42.00
Nonpartisan	Gary Superman	672	12.05
Other	Write-ins	3	0.05
Total votes		5,579	100.00

Alaska House District 9 election, 1994
Party	Candidate	Votes	%
Democratic	Mike Navarre	2,079	46.07
Republican	Mark Hodgins	1,965	43.54
Nonpartisan	Gary Superman	465	10.30
Other	Write-ins	4	0.09
Total votes		4,513	100.00

Alaska House District 9 election, 1996
Party	Candidate	Votes	%
Republican	Mark Hodgins	3,078	56.96
Democratic	Lorraine F. Crawford	2,309	42.73
Other	Write-ins	17	0.32
Total votes		5,404	100.00

Alaska House District 9 election, 1998
Party	Candidate	Votes	%
Democratic	Harold Smalley	2,652	51.95
Republican	Mark Hodgins	2,421	47.42
Other	Write-ins	32	0.63
Total votes		5,105	100.00
