= Kenai Central High School =

Location
- 9583 Kenai Spur Highway; Kenai, Kenai Peninsula Borough, Alaska 99661; United States; 60°33′41″N 151°12′47″W

Information
- School type: Public
- School district: Kenai Peninsula Borough School District
- CEEB code: 020060
- Principal: Dan Beck
- Teaching staff: 27.29 (FTE)
- Grades: 9–12
- Enrollment: 494 (2023–2024)
- Student to teacher ratio: 18.10
- Colors: Red, white, and black
- Mascot: Tuffy the Kardinal
- Nickname: KCHS
- Budget: not enough
- Website: kpbsd.org/schools/kenai-central/

Kenai Central High School (KCHS) is a public high school serving grades 9–12 in Kenai, Alaska. The school operates under the authority of the Kenai Peninsula Borough School District, and is one of five high schools in the district. The School's mascot is the Kardinal, and its colors are red, white and black. The current principal is Dan Beck, and its assistant principal is Will Chervenak.

== Notable alumni ==
- Allie Ostrander, professional runner
- Kelly Wolf, Alaska state representative
- Mike Chenault, Alaska state representative
