= List of mayors of Valdez, Alaska =

The following is a list of mayors of the city of Valdez, Alaska, United States.

- John L. Steel, 1901-1903 (Note: Other sources name John W. Leedy as mayor, 1901-1903)
- John Goodell, 1903-1905
- Henry Miller, 1905-1907
- Thos. Quinn, 1907-1909
- L. Archibald, 1909-1910
- F.M. Boyle, 1910-1912
- E.E. Ritchie, c.1912-1914
- Ed. Wood, c.1915
- Jas. Patterson, 1916-1917
- Anthony J. Dimond, c.1918-1922, 1925-1928
- James H. Patterson, c.1922
- Walter T. Stuart, c.1923, c.1933
- William A. Egan, c.1946
- C.G. Stith, c.1950
- C.J. Egan, c.1950
- William Growden, c.1955
- Walter H. "Walt" Day
- Lynn Chrystal, 1976-1977, 1989-1990
- Mac MacDonald, c.1978
- Bill Walker, c.1979-1980
- Steve McAlpine, 1980-1982
- Susy Collins, c.1982
- John Searle Devens, c.1984-1989
- John Harris, 1992-1996
- Dave C. Cobb, c.1998-2000
- Bert Cottle, c.2008-2009
- Larry Weaver, c.2015-2016
- Ruth Knight, c.2017-2018
- Jeremy O'Neil, c.2020-2021
- Sharon Scheidt, c.2022-2024
- Dennis Fleming, 2024-present

== See also ==
- Valdez history
