= John Harris (Alaska politician) =

American politician

- John Harris (left of center, behind Peggy Wilson) at a briefing with fellow legislators in March 2001.

24th Speaker of the Alaska House of Representatives

Member of the Alaska House of Representatives
- In office 2005–2009
- Governor: Frank Murkowski; Sarah Palin
- Preceded by: Pete Kott
- Succeeded by: Mike Chenault

Member of the Alaska House of Representatives from the 12th (previously 35th) district
- In office January 19, 1999 – January 2011
- Preceded by: Eugene G. Kubina
- Succeeded by: Eric Feige

Personal details
- Born: October 15, 1957 (age 68) Glennallen, Alaska
- Party: Republican
- Occupation: Teamster

John Harris (born October 15, 1957, in Glennallen, Alaska) is an American politician and member of the Alaska House of Representatives. He served as Speaker of the House from 2005 to 2008. He was first elected in 1998 and represents the 12th district, as a member of the Republican Party. He was the mayor of Valdez from 1992 to 1996 and a member of the Valdez City Council from 1990 to 1998. John Harris attended Lincoln Electric Welding School in Cleveland, Ohio and Spartan School of Aeronautics in Tulsa, Oklahoma. He is the owner of Valdez Industrial Supply, and has been a board member of Horizons Unlimited, Resource of Alaska, and United Way.

He is Chair of the House Committee on Committees and was Co-Chair of the Finance Committee. He is a member of the Armed Services Committee, the ASC Subcommittee on Homeland Security, the Rules Committee, the Legislative Council Committee, and the following Finance Subcommittees: Court System, Governor, Legislature, and University of Alaska. He was a member of the Ethics Committee, the Finance Committee, the Legislative Budget & Audit Joint Committee, and the Finance Subcommittees for Health & Social Services and Corrections.

Harris contemplated running for Alaska governor in 2010 but dropped out of the race over fundraising concerns.

== Political views and proposals ==
Harris has asked Ben Stevens, former Alaska state senator and son of Ted Stevens, to resign from his position on the Republican National Committee. Stevens is under investigation for his ties to the oil field services company Veco Corp. In 2002, Harris offered an amendment that would have stopped an increase in state alcohol tax. In 2001, due to legal problems posed when pilots fly into Canada, he introduced a bill to change the law requiring pilots to carry a gun as part of their survival kit. He opposed a bill that would have stopped the minimum wage from increasing with inflation.

== See also ==
- List of mayors of Valdez, Alaska
