= Richard Foster (Alaska politician) =

American politician (1946–2009)

Member of the Alaska House of Representatives from the 39th district (23rd district 1989–1993, 38th district 1993–2003)
- In office January 9, 1989 – October 13, 2009
- Preceded by: Henry Springer
- Succeeded by: Neal Foster

Personal details
- Born: August 9, 1946 Nome, Alaska
- Died: October 13, 2009 (aged 63) Seattle, Washington
- Party: Democratic
- Spouse: Cathy
- Children: Neal, Jimmy, Myria, Justin, Tiffany, Richard, Nathan, Ramsey, Chandler (born between 1972 and 1989)
- Education: University of Alaska
- Occupation: Air taxi operator

Neal Richard Foster (August 9, 1946 – October 13, 2009) was a Democratic member of the Alaska House of Representatives, representing various districts centered on Nome, Alaska from 1989 until his death. Though a Democrat, he frequently caucused with the Republicans and served for a period of time as the Majority Whip.

He died of a heart attack while receiving treatment for kidney disease. His oldest son, Neal Foster, was appointed to replace him, and was elected to his own term in 2010.

At the time of his death, he was the second longest-serving member in the history of the Alaska House, behind Carl Moses, who also represented western Alaska (Max Gruenberg surpassed his tenure in October 2015). He was also a second-generation member of the Alaska Legislature; his father, Neal W. "Willie" Foster (1916-1979), served one term apiece in the Alaska Senate representing Nome before and following statehood.

== See also ==
- List of Native American politicians
