= Mike Chenault =

American politician (born 1957)

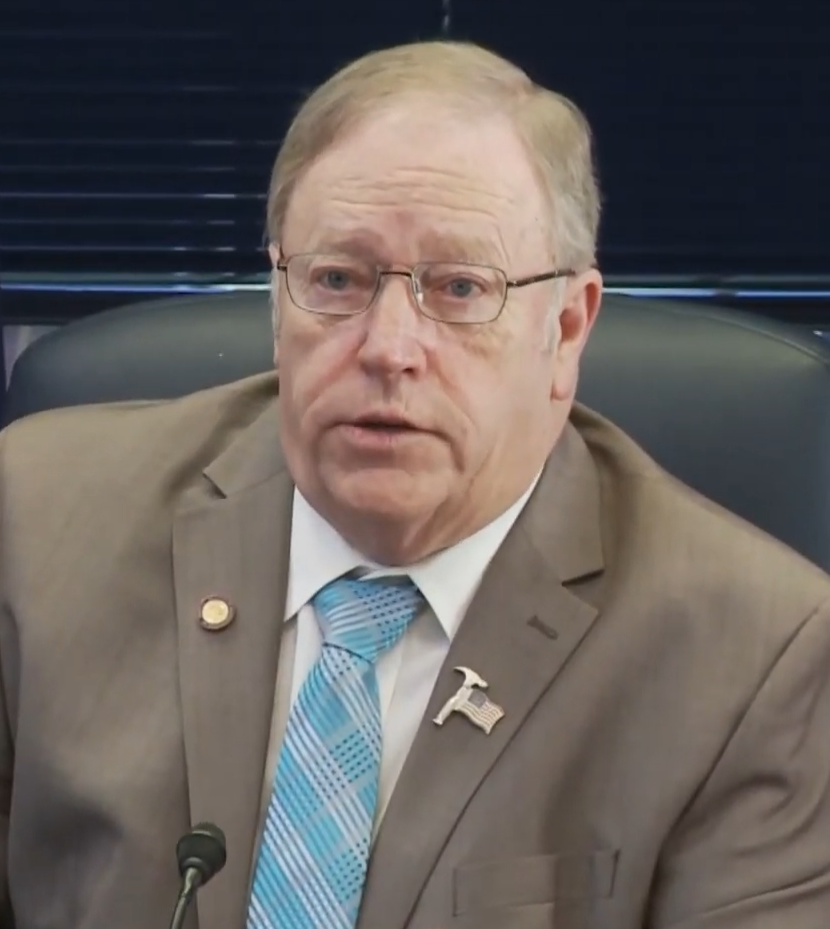

Speaker of the Alaska House of Representatives
- In office January 20, 2009 – January 17, 2017
- Preceded by: John Harris
- Succeeded by: Bryce Edgmon

Member of the Alaska House of Representatives from the 29th district
- In office January 15, 2013 – January 15, 2019
- Preceded by: Redistricted
- Succeeded by: Ben Carpenter

Member of the Alaska House of Representatives from the 34th district
- In office January 20, 2003 – January 15, 2013
- Preceded by: Redistricted
- Succeeded by: Redistricted

Member of the Alaska House of Representatives from the 9th district
- In office January 8, 2001 – January 20, 2003
- Preceded by: Hal Smalley
- Succeeded by: Redistricted

Personal details
- Born: Charles Michael Chenault; February 25, 1957 (age 69) Hobbs, New Mexico, U.S.
- Party: Republican
- Spouse: Tanna
- Children: 4

Charles Michael Chenault (born February 25, 1957) is an American politician in the state of Alaska. Chenault served as a Republican member of the Alaska House of Representatives from 2001 to 2019, representing portions of the Kenai Peninsula Borough, where he has lived for most of his life. Chenault served as the body's speaker from 2009 to 2017. He lost his position as house speaker to Democrat Bryce Edgmon when three Republicans joined a coalition of Democrats to form a bipartisan house majority after the general election in November 2016.

== Early life ==
Charles Michael Chenault was born in Hobbs, New Mexico on February 25, 1957. He moved to the Kenai Peninsula of Alaska with his family as a child. Chenault graduated from Kenai Central High School in 1975.

Chenault began a career in construction. He was vice-president of the Qwick Construction Company when he entered politics. His professional experience led to a tenure as president of the North Peninsula Chamber of Commerce.

== Political career ==
In 2000, Mike Chenault ran as a Republican candidate for the Alaska House of Representatives from the Kenai Peninsula-based 9th district, defeating one-term Democratic incumbent and former schoolteacher Harold "Hal" Smalley. He was re-elected mostly with little difficulty.

He was first elected Speaker of the Alaska House for the 26th Alaska State Legislature. He was a member of several committees, including the Rules Committee, the Legislative Council, and was an alternate for the Labor & Commerce Committee. He also sits on Finance subcommittees for Government, Transportation, and the Legislature.

In the 30th Legislature, Chenault was in his ninth and final term in the House. He served four terms as House Speaker, becoming the longest-serving holder of that office. He represented Alaska's 29th House District, which encompasses most of the eastern Kenai Peninsula, stretching from Nikiski to Seward and the area in between. He did not run in 2018 and was succeeded by Ben Carpenter.

Chenault briefly ran for the Republican nomination for Alaska Governor, but dropped out before the primary as the party consolidated around Mike Dunleavy.

== Personal life ==
Mike Chenault is married to Tanna. They have four children: a son, Brandon, and three daughters; Elisha, Shanda and Miranda.
