= Smalley's Inn & Restaurant =

Tavern, restaurant and former hotel

Coordinates: 41°25′37.7″N 73°40′45″W

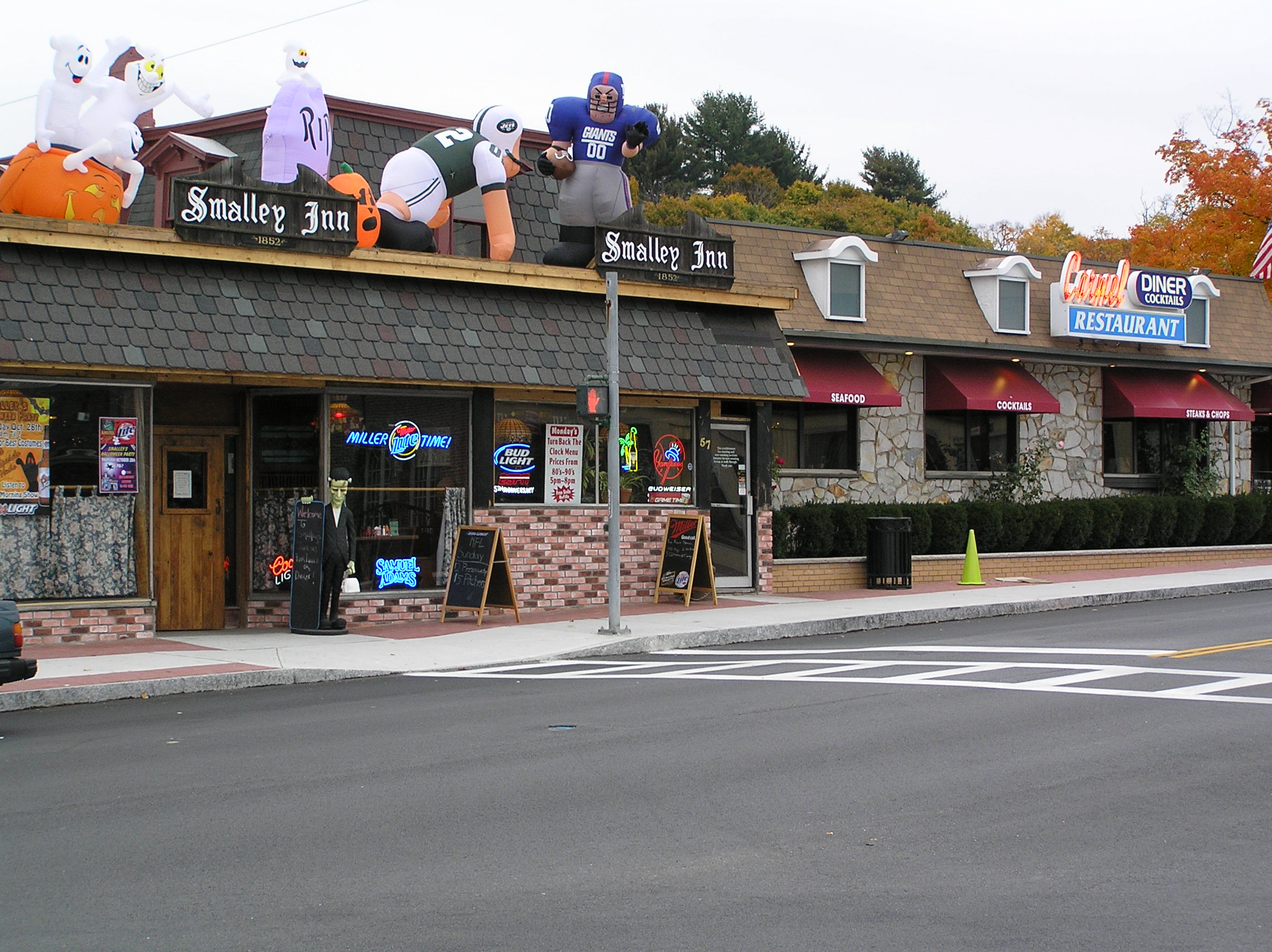
Smalley Inn on NYS Route 52 in Carmel, New York

Smalley's Inn was a tavern, restaurant and former hotel that was open in Carmel, New York, United States from 1852 to 2020.

== History ==
Smalley Inn was opened in 1852 by James Smalley. In 1924, the inn and much of Carmel burned to the ground. A new Smalley's Hotel was built. The hotel was located where the Palmer Agency, Smith Barney and the Smalley Inn Restaurant are located now. The Putnam County National Bank was also located in Smalley's Hotel in 1896.

The old hotel was later divided and sold to private business owners. Millie Conigllio bought Smalley Inn & Restaurant in the early 1950s. As a new resident of the area, she decided to keep the name.

The business was later taken up by her son, Anthony F. Porto Sr., who remains the current owner, along with his son, Anthony M. Porto Jr.

Smalley's, along with a swath of buildings on Carmel's Route 52 business corridor, was once again ravished by fire in 1974 (50 years after the similar conflagration of 1924). Recently, the Inn was renovated.

A family restaurant currently lies to the left of the old-fashioned bar.

Smalley's Inn announced its closure in 2020, reportedly due to financial reasons as well as Porto's health, and service came to an end on January 15, 2020, at 2:00 PM., after being in business for over 55 years.

== News and events ==
Since closing, the business has been up for sale.

Owners and employees have noted peculiar sightings and events for years.

Approximately fifteen years ago, Anthony Porto Jr. found the tombstone of a little girl buried under a set of basement steps in the restaurant. After this occurrence, these peculiar events intensified.

Frequent ghostly sightings of a little girl prompted owners at the Inn to contact paranormal investigators. It was clarified that the ghost in Smalley Inn was Elizabeth Smalley, daughter of original owner James Smalley, who had been killed as a toddler.

SMALLEY INN on Route 52 in Carmel has all the ingredients for a haunting. The inn was built around the mid-19th century, though evidence shows it may have been around a lot longer.

Owner James J. Smalley was at various times the sheriff, coroner and treasurer of the town. His daughter, Elizabeth, was only a toddler when she died, and there is a belief that a portion of the basement was used as a morgue when Smalley was the coroner.

Witnesses have had their clothing tugged on, have seen ghostly figures of a man, woman and child, and, on one occasion, every cell and house phone went off at exactly the same time, with each call originating from a phone within the building. Tony's dad, Anthony, who owns the inn, has had experiences in the upstairs apartment, and the inn's staff members have their own stories of happenings in the kitchen and basement liquor closet and meat locker.

One waitress has said that she has heard footsteps, while working alone, in the attic. When she confronted someone, the answer was that no one was ever up there. No one wants to go downstairs for they feel a strange presence. As for Anthony, while upstairs and lying in his queen-sized bed, he felt someone on the other side of his bed... just lying there. Once he got up, there was nobody there.

Anthony wanted to build a sports bar in the basement. But to do that, men had to work around "The Pillar". The ghost of Elizabeth was said to peek out behind the pillar. Almost as if playing peek-a-boo or hide and go seek. As one man tried to work downstairs, he came up asking "Is this like a joke?" and left. The second man came over, went downstairs, came up freaked out, and left. As for the third man, he went down, came up almost in tears and screaming, and left. He forgot his tools in the basement.

Radio station K104 visits the restaurant yearly around Halloween with paranormal investigators for entertainment.

On August 17, 2012, Travel Channel aired an episode of "The Dead Files" filmed in Smalley Inn. In the episode, the show's psychic medium, Amy Allan, said she saw the transparent ghosts of a banshee and a soldier, who reportedly haunt the building.

Hauntings of the Hudson River Valley, An Investigative Journey, by Vincent T. Dacqunio and Postcard History Series- Carmel, by George Carroll Wipple III are books entailing detailed references of the history behind the current paranormal events documented at Smalley Inn & Restaurant.
