= Prior review =

Material reviewed before publication

Prior review occurs when executive persons read and review materials before they have been made available to the public.

Prior review is distinct from prior restraint, the government prohibition of speech in advance of its publication.
