= Kurt Olson =

American politician (1948–2023)

Member of the Alaska House of Representatives from the 30th district
- In office January 17, 2005 – January 17, 2017
- Preceded by: Kelly Wolf
- Succeeded by: Gary Knopp

Personal details
- Born: Kurt Edward Olson; March 24, 1948 Sacramento, California, U.S.
- Died: November 9, 2023 (aged 75) Soldotna, Alaska, U.S.
- Party: Republican
- Education: California State University
- Occupation: Legislative Aide; Insurance Broker

Military service
- Allegiance: United States
- Branch/service: United States Air Force
- Years of service: 1967–1971

Kurt Edward Olson (March 24, 1948 – November 9, 2023) was an American politician who was a Republican member of the Alaska House of Representatives, representing the 30th District from 2005 until 2017. He served as Chair of the Labor & Commerce Committee, Vice Chair of the Rules Committee, a member of the Resources Committee, and Legislative Budget & Audit Committee. He also served on the Administration, Natural Resources, and Labor & Workforce Finance Subcommittees, for the 29th Legislature. Representative Olson served in the United States Air Force from 1967 to 1971.

== Personal life and death ==
Olson was married to Barbara and had two children: Madelyn and Valerie, a granddaughter: Isabella. Representative Olson graduated from Cupertino High School in 1966, and received a Bachelor of Arts from California State University in 1977.

Kurt Olson died of pancreatic cancer in Soldotna, on November 9, 2023, at the age of 75.
