= Sharon Cissna =

American politician

Member of the Alaska House of Representatives from the 22nd district
- In office January 20, 2003 – January 15, 2013
- Preceded by: Harry Crawford

Member of the Alaska House of Representatives from the 21st district
- In office January 19, 1999 – January 20, 2003
- Preceded by: Joe Ryan
- Succeeded by: Harry Crawford

Personal details
- Born: April 5, 1942 (age 84) Seattle, Washington, U.S.
- Party: Democratic
- Spouse: Sid Atwood
- Education: University of Alaska Anchorage (BA); Alaska Pacific University
- Occupation: Business owner

Sharon Marie Cissna (born April 5, 1942) is an American politician and former Democratic member of the Alaska House of Representatives, representing the 22nd District from 1999 to 2013.

== Early life, education, and early career ==
In 1942, she was born in Seattle, Washington. She graduated from Federal Way High School in 1960. She attended Knapp Business College in 1962 and the University of Washington in 1964. In 1967 she moved to Alaska and has lived there ever since. She earned a B.A. from University of Alaska-Anchorage in 1972. She earned a master's degree from Alaska Pacific University in 1992. She graduated from community emergency response training in 1999.

She has been the Owner/Operator of PS Publication Services since 1972. In the 1970s, she was a legislative aide for the Alaska House of Representatives. She was a counselor at South Central Foundation Traditional Healing from 1991–1992. She was a Supervisor at Family Treatment Homes from 1993–1994. She was a counselor, Mental Health Therapist, and owner of SOLUTIONS (Family/Individual Counseling) from 1994–1998. She was also a Home Based Mental Health Counselor at Hope Cottages from 1995–1998. She was Chairwoman of the Airport Heights Community Council from 1997-1999.

== Alaska House of Representatives ==
=== Elections ===
She first ran for the Alaska's 21st House District in 1996. She lost by just one vote in the primary to former state representative Ann Spohnholz. In 1998, she ran again and won the primary with 47% of the vote. In the general election, she defeated incumbent Republican state representative Joe Ryan 53%-47%. In 2000, she won re-election to a second term with 54% of the vote. In 2002 after redistricting, she decided to run in the newly redrawn Alaska's 22nd House District. She won re-election to a third term with 54% of the vote. In 2004, she won re-election to a fourth term with 57% of the vote. In 2006, she won re-election to a fifth term with 94% of the vote. In 2008, she won re-election to a sixth term with 61% of the vote. In 2010, she won re-election to a seventh term with 93% of the vote.

=== Committee assignments ===
- House Committee on Community and Regional Affairs
- House Committee on Education
- House Committee on Health and Social Services
- House Committee on Military & Veterans' Affairs

== 2010 TSA procedures protest ==
At the Seattle Airport in November, 2010, a Transportation Security Administration (TSA) airport screening device identified her prosthesis for a missing breast. As a result, cancer survivor Cissna was subjected to a particularly humiliating and intrusive body search. Rep. Cissna was faced again with the invasive procedure on February 21, 2011 when being screened in Seattle for a return to Anchorage. She refused to be subjected to such an indignity once more and returned to Alaska by boat and taxicab. Her experience received national publicity, questioning the methods which TSA forces upon those least likely to be security threats. Similarly, Kentucky U.S. Senator Rand Paul missed a flight after he refused to undergo a pat down after an anomaly was spotted during a TSA body scan.

== 2012 congressional election ==
On April 11, 2012, Cissna announced that she would become a candidate to run against 19-term Alaska Republican Congressman Don Young, the United States House of Representatives sponsor of the Aviation and Transportation Security Act that created the TSA in 2001. Cissna won her five-person primary with 50% of the Democratic vote. She vowed to make resistance against useless and unnecessary humiliation by the TSA part of her campaign.

On November 6, 2012, Cissna lost the Congressional race to incumbent Don Young, 63.94% to 28.61%.

== Personal life ==
Cissna lives in Anchorage, Alaska and was widowed twice and is currently married. She has one daughter named Robin.
