= Joe Ryan (politician) =

American businessman and politician

Member of the Alaska House of Representatives from the 21st district
- In office January 13, 1997 – January 19, 1999
- Preceded by: Bettye Davis
- Succeeded by: Sharon Cissna

Personal details
- Born: Joseph Patrick Ryan; July 5, 1936 Cleveland, Ohio, U.S.
- Died: November 7, 2016 (aged 80) Fairbanks, Alaska, U.S.
- Party: Republican

Joseph Patrick Ryan (July 5, 1936 – November 7, 2016) was an American businessman and politician.

Born in Cleveland, Ohio, Ryan served in the United States Air Force following high school. He settled in Canton, Ohio during the early 1960s, then moved to Fairbanks, Alaska in 1975. Ryan worked as a mechanic during the construction of the Trans-Alaska Pipeline System and later as an airline transport pilot. He served on the Fairbanks North Star Borough Assembly for a single term, from 1987 to 1990, winning election by defeating an eleven-year incumbent. Ryan was a Republican and active in the Alaska Republican Party, serving as the organization's platform chair at one point. From 1997 to 1999, Ryan served in the Alaska House of Representatives representing east Anchorage. Ryan returned to Fairbanks in later life, where he died on November 7, 2016.
