= Nick Stepovich =

American politician and businessman

Nicholas Stepovich (born December 31, 1957) is an American politician and businessman.

Stepovich was born in Juneau, Alaska Territory and has lived in Fairbanks, Alaska, since 1958. He graduated from Monroe High School in Fairbanks in 1976 and received his bachelor's degree in history from Southern Oregon University in 1980. He owned the Soapy Smith's Pioneer Restaurant in Fairbanks.

Stepovich served in the Alaska House of Representatives in 2003 and 2004 and was a Republican.

In 2009, Stepovich was convicted of cocaine possession and tampering with evidence. In 2016, the Alaska Court of Appeals partially overturned the conviction.
