= Elyse Guttenberg =

American novelist

Elyse Guttenberg (born August 9, 1952) is an Alaskan writer known primarily for her fantasy novels. Guttenberg served for many years as a member of the Alaska State Council on the Arts Literature Review Panel, and the Fairbanks North Star Borough Library Commission. She has written three books, Sunder, Eclipse and Seed (1990), Summer Light (1995) and Daughter of the Shaman (1997).

== Early life ==
Elyse Guttenberg was born in New York City and grew up in Astoria and Rochdale Village in Queens. In 1972, she followed her two brothers, Richard and David Guttenberg north to attend the University of Alaska Fairbanks where she received a bachelor's degree in anthropology (1977) and a MAT in English (1979). At UAF, Guttenberg was one of the founding editors of Permafrost, the nation's farthest north literary journal.

== Career ==
Guttenberg served for many years as a member of the Alaska State Council on the Arts Literature Review Panel, and the Fairbanks North Star Borough Library Commission.

Her works include:

- three novels - Sunder, Eclipse and Seed (1990), Summer Light (1995) and Daughter of the Shaman (1997);
- other shorter works.

Guttenberg was the recipient of an Individual Artist Fellowship in Literature from the Alaska State Council on the Arts. In 1988, Guttenberg and Jean Anderson were the recipients of an Alaska State Council's initiative grant to publish "Inroads: An Anthology Celebrating Alaska's Twenty-Seven Fellowship Writers".

Her 1990 novel "Sunder, Eclipse and Seed," received honorable mention for the William L. Crawford Award for the year's best new fantasy from the International Association for the Fantastic in the Arts.

In 2013, Guttenberg was the organiser of Fairbanks' Jewish Film Festival.

== Personal life ==
Guttenberg's married Luke Hopkins (born ca. 1945) in 1977 and has two grown children, Selena and Grier Hopkins, an Alaska state legislator. Guttenberg's husband was the mayor of the Fairbanks North Star Borough from 2009 to 2015.

== Works ==
- Inroads: An Anthology Celebrating Alaska's Twenty-Seven Fellowship Writers, 1988. Alaska State Council. Edited with Jean Anderson
- Sunder, Eclipse and Seed, Roc, 1990
- Summer Light, HarperPrism, 1995
- Daughter of the Shaman, HarperCollins, 1997

=== Shorter works ===
- "Selena's Song," in Spaceships and Spells, edited by Jane Yolen, Martin Greenberg, & Charles Waugh. Harper and Row, 1987
- "Plane Story," in The Women's Press Book of Myth and Magic, edited by Helen Windrath, The Women's Press, 1993
- "Rules for Winter," (poetry) About Place Journal, Vol.II, Issue II web page

=== Anthologies ===
- "The Faces of Fantasy: Photographs by Patti Perret," intro. by Terri Windling, ISBN 0-312-86182-6
- Summer Light excerpt in "The Last New Land, stories of Alaska Past and Present," edited by Wayne Mergler, forward John Haines, ISBN 0882408143
