= List of mayors of Fairbanks, Alaska =

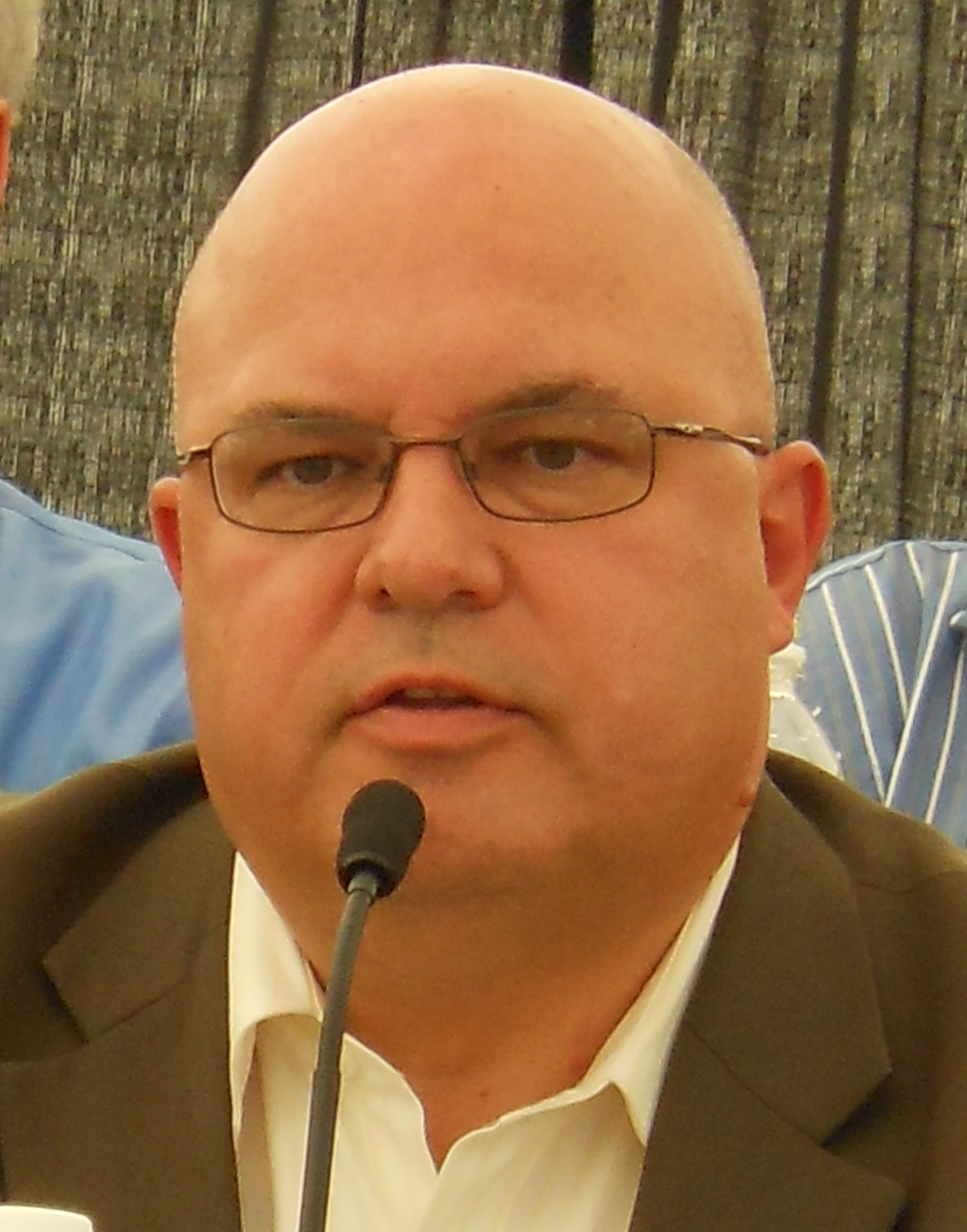
David Pruhs, shown campaigning for the Alaska House of Representatives at the 2012 Tanana Valley State Fair, is the incumbent mayor of Fairbanks. Pruhs took office on October 24, 2022.

The following lists the individuals who have served as mayor of Fairbanks, Alaska, as well as the ten mayors of the Fairbanks North Star Borough, a county equivalent that includes the city.

Fairbanks, a home rule city in the U.S. state of Alaska, was founded in 1901. It was incorporated as a town on November 10, 1903, pursuant to laws allowing communities in Alaska to incorporate. Following changes in those laws during the latter territorial era, Fairbanks incorporated as a city ca. 1950. When statehood became effective for Alaska in 1959, the Alaska Constitution provided for home rule, a status the citizens of Fairbanks ratified the following year.

The Fairbanks North Star Borough, which encompasses the city and several surrounding towns and villages, was established by an act of the Alaska State Legislature in 1963 (Chapter 52, Session Laws of Alaska 1963), and incorporated on January 1, 1964. The borough seat is in Fairbanks.

== Mayors of the city of Fairbanks ==
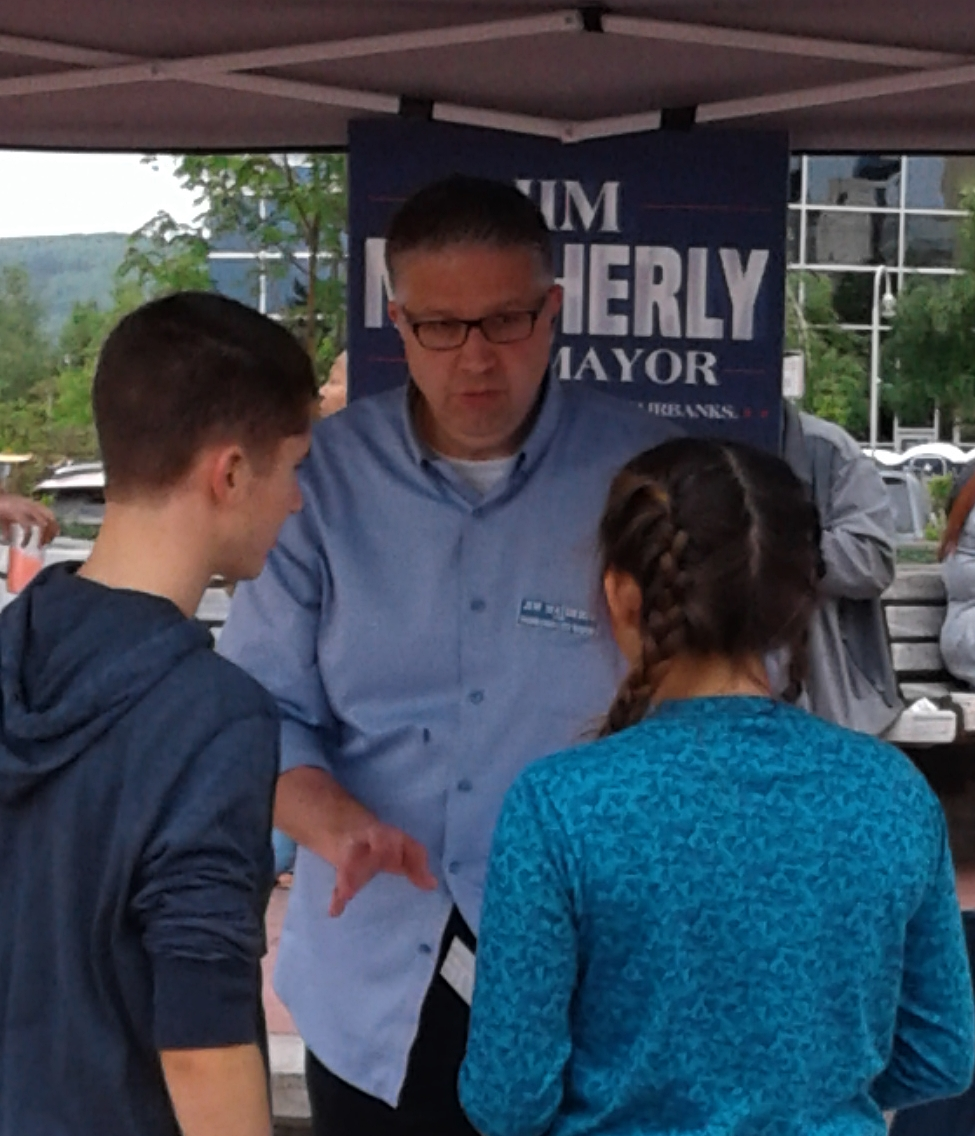
Jim Matherly was mayor from 2016 to 2022. Matherly is shown while campaigning for the office at a street fair in downtown Fairbanks in 2016.

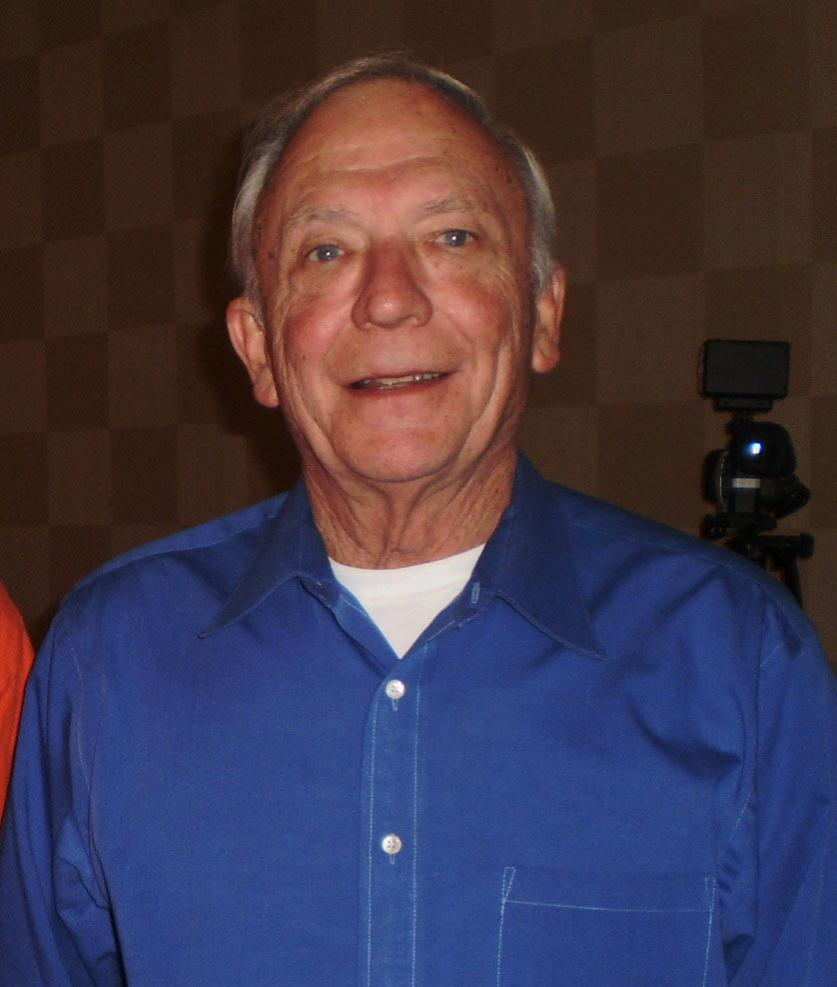
Steve Thompson (2010)

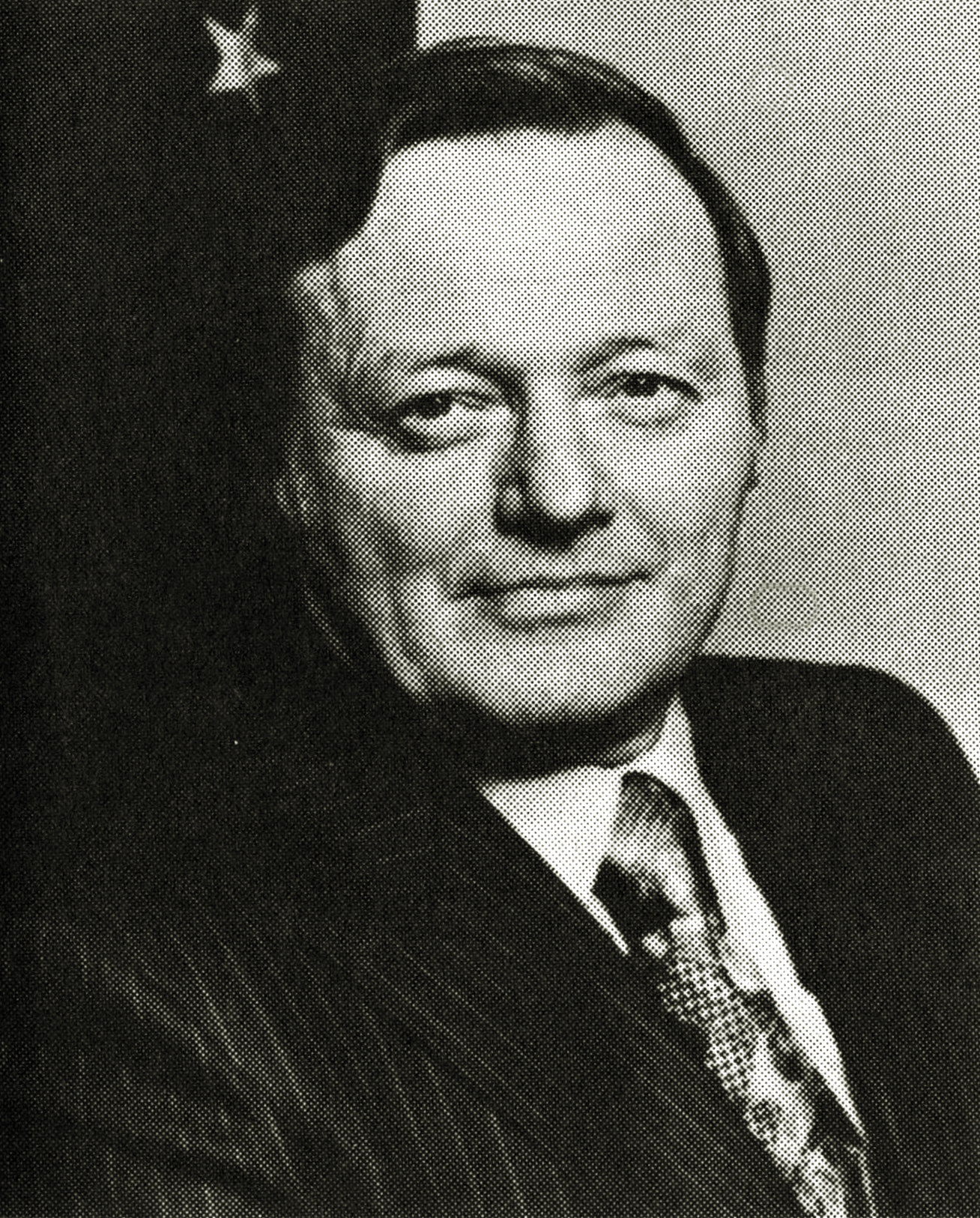
H. A. Boucher (1973)

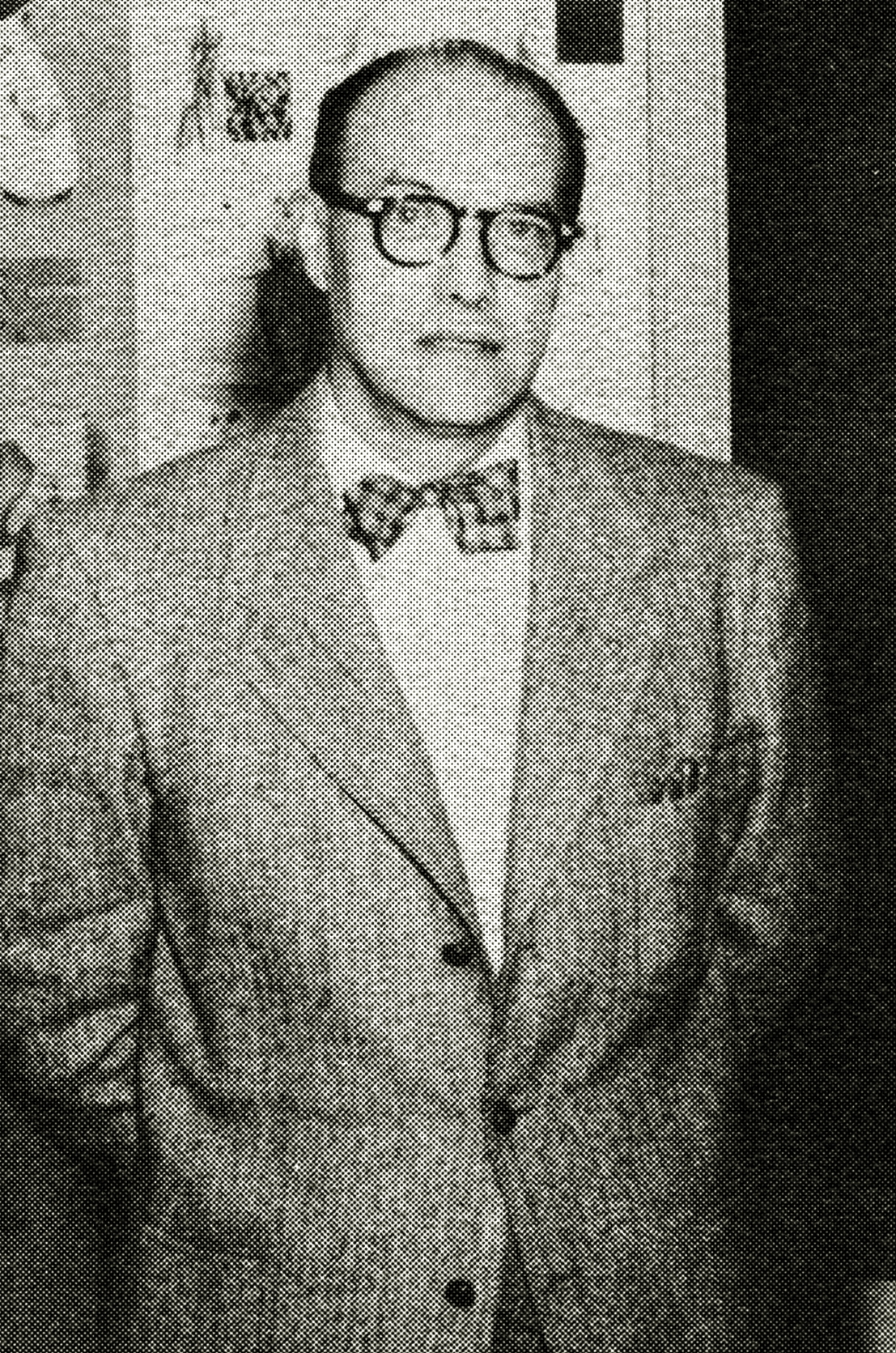
Douglas Preston (1953)

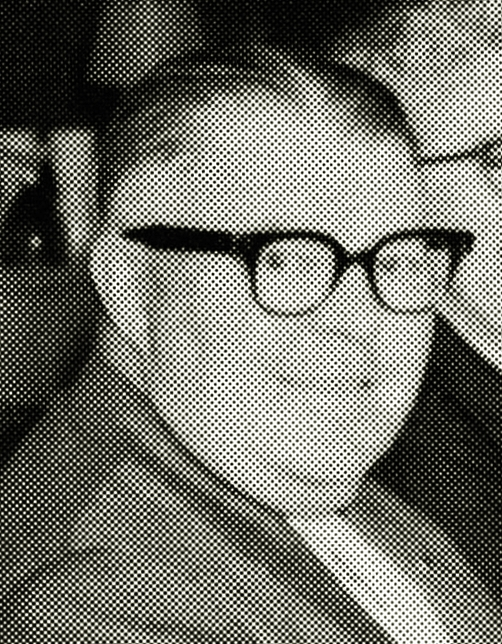
Maurice Johnson (1960)

The city mayor was originally elected from amongst the council. Later the system changed to elect the mayor directly for a two-year term, but with few responsibilities, as the city was administered by a manager. The mayor began serving as the chief administrator of city government, serving a three-year term, in 1992.

Order	Name	Term start
1	E. T. Barnette	1903
2	B.D. Mills	1906
3	J. Barrack	1907
4	Fred Carter	1908
5	Joseph Smith	1909
6	Mel Sabin	1909
7	A.J. Nordale	1910
8	F.S. Gordon	1911
9	Dan Driscoll	1912
10	E.C. Heacock	1913
11	Murray C. Smith	1913
12	Andrew Nerland	1915
13	R.R. Meyers	1916
14	G.M. Smith	1917
15	Henry T. Ray	1917
16	E.E. Suter	1918
17	A.L. Wilbur	1919
18	C.H. Woodward	1921
19	R.W. Ferguson	1922
20	Thomas A. Marquam	1923
21	Dr. Frank De La Vergne	1925
22	Jessie F. Bryant	1931
23	Arnold Nordale	1933
24	E. B. Collins	1934
25	Arthur Leslie Nerland	1938
26	William Growden	1940
27	Howard G. Hughes	1943
28	Alfeld Hjalmar Nordale	1945
29	Ray Kohler	1948
30	Maurice Johnson	1949
31	Robert Hoopes	1950
32	Ralph J. Rivers	1952
33	Douglas Preston	1954
34	Paul B. Haggland	1957
35	Joseph M. Ribar	1960
36	Darrell Brewington	1962
37	Sylvia Ringstad	1965
38	H. A. Boucher	1966
39	Julian C. Rice	1970
40	Harold Gillam	1972
41	William Ransom Wood	1978
42	Ruth E. Burnett	1980
43	Bill Walley	1982
44	James D. Nordale	1988
45	Wayne S. Nelson	1990
46	James C. Hayes	1992
47	Steve M. Thompson	2001
48	Terry Strle	2007
49	Jerry Cleworth	2010
50	John Eberhart	2013
51	Jim Matherly	2016
52	David Pruhs	2022
53	Mindy O'Neall	2025

== Mayors of Fairbanks North Star Borough ==
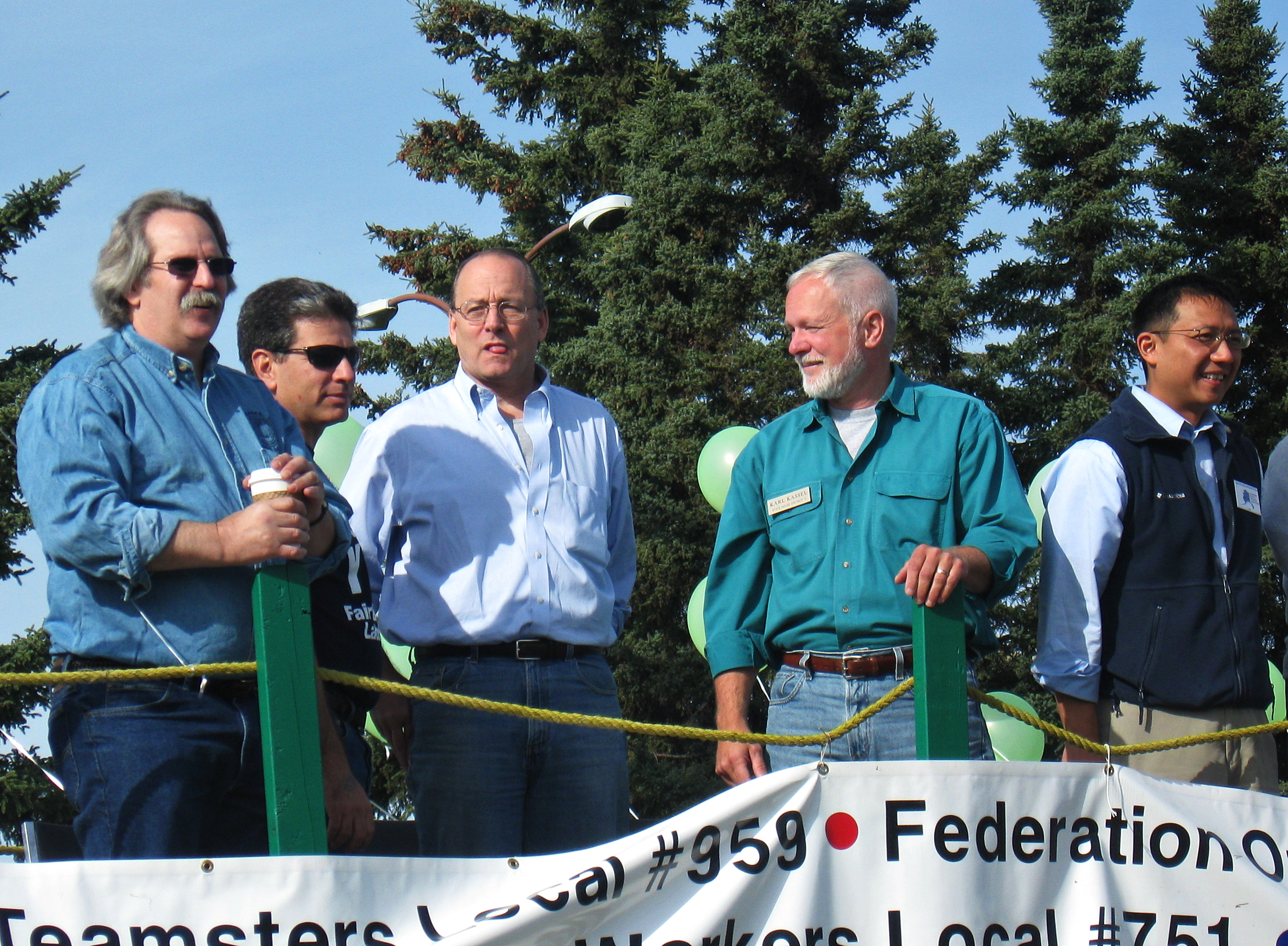
Then-borough mayor Jim Whitaker and current mayor Karl Kassel on the grandstand of the Fairbanks Labor Day parade in 2008. They are flanked by David Guttenberg, Ethan Berkowitz and Scott Kawasaki.

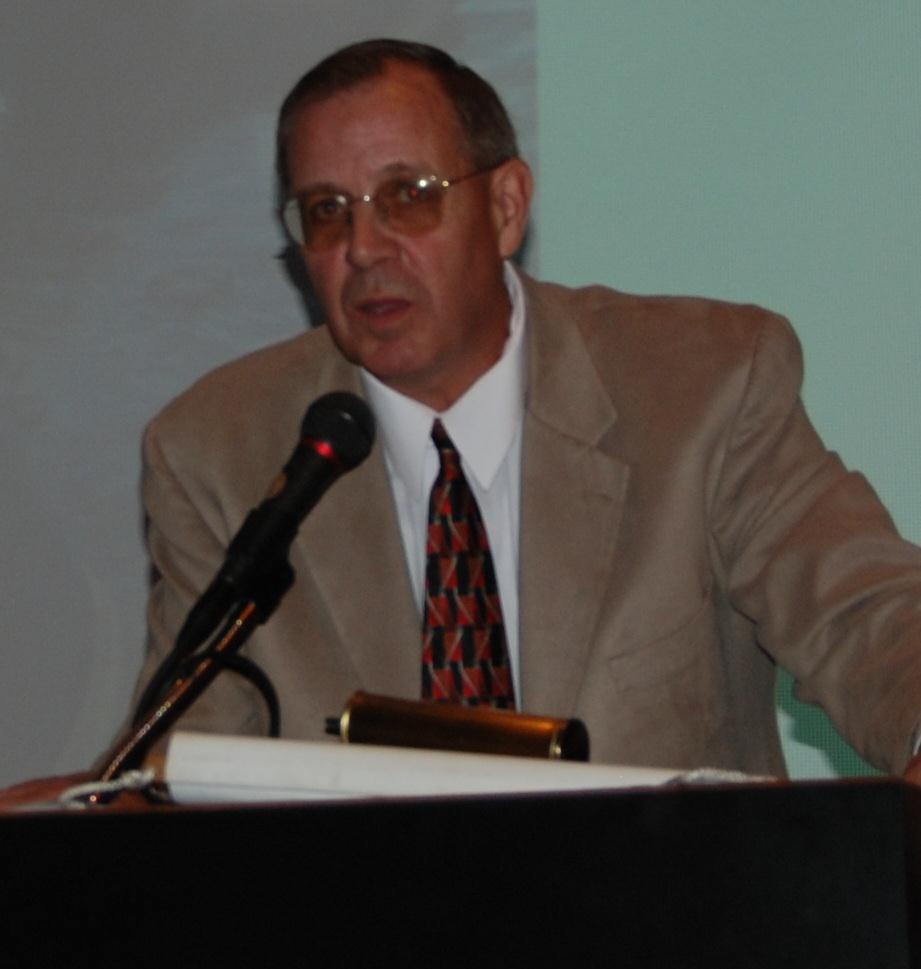
Jim Sampson (2008)

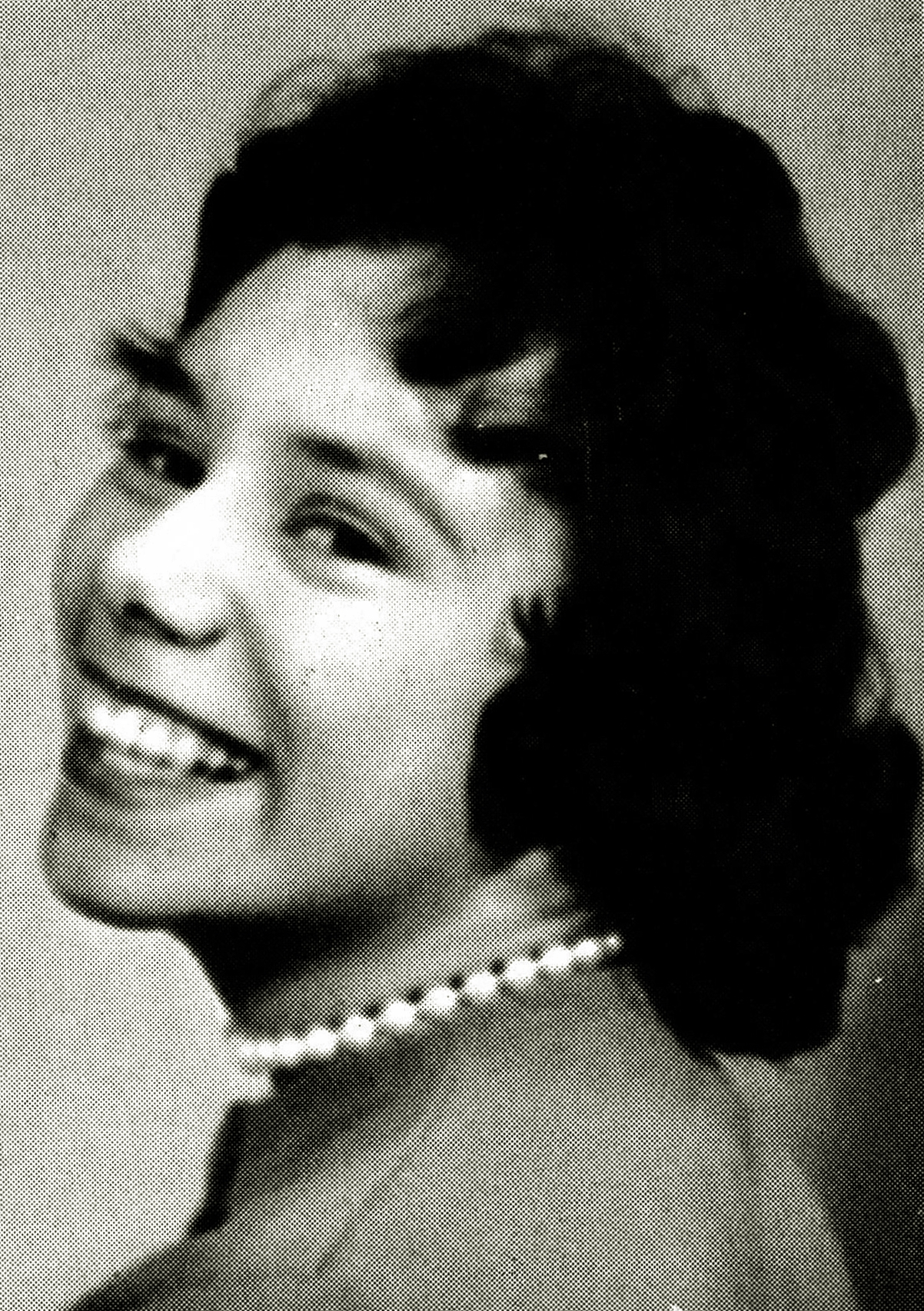
Juanita Helms (1959)

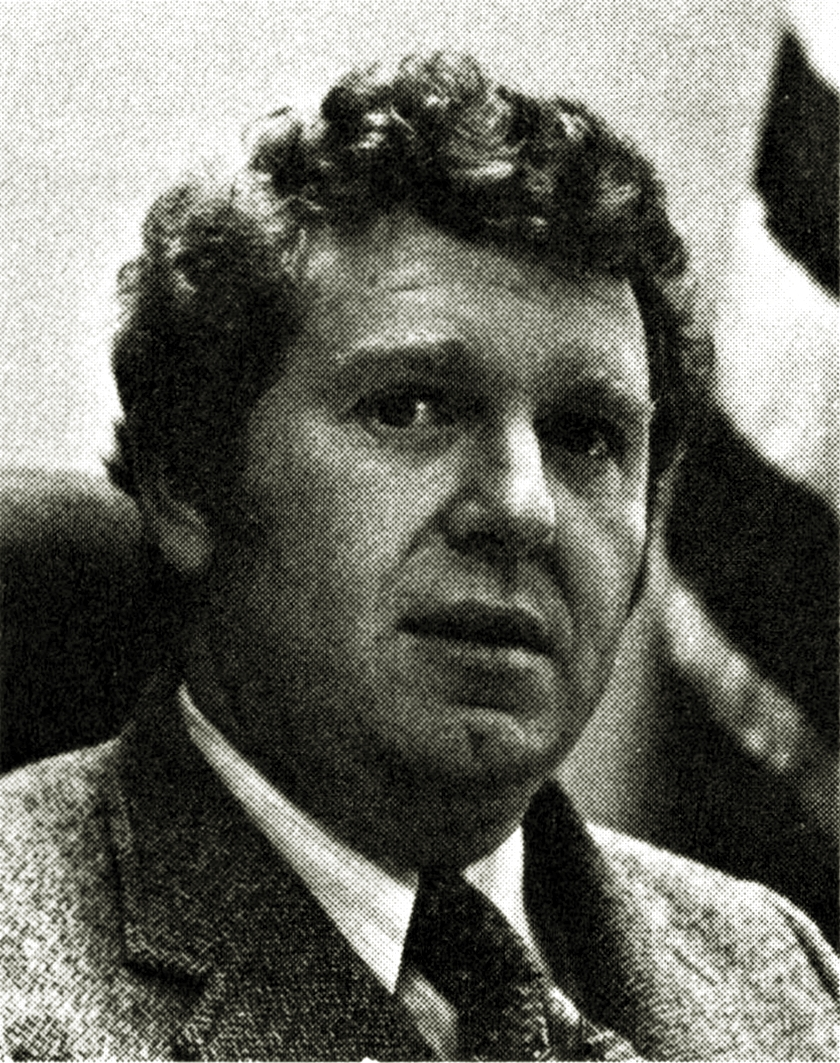
Bil Allen (1977)

The borough mayor's position was originally titled chairman, rather than mayor, until the mid-1970s, given the structure which the legislature had originally established for organized boroughs. The term of office had changed from two years to three years at around the same time. The position is non-partisan.

Nr.	Name	Term start
1	John D. Schleppegrell	1964
2	Harold Gillam	1966
3	John A. Carlson	1968
4	Bill Allen	1982
5	Juanita Helms	1985
6	Jim Sampson	1990
7	Hank Hove	1997
8	Rhonda Boyles (R)	2000
9	Jim Whitaker (R)	2003
10	Luke T. Hopkins (D)	2009
11	Karl Kassel (I)	2015
12	Bryce Ward (R)	2018
13	Grier Hopkins (D)	2024
