= David Pruhs =

American politician

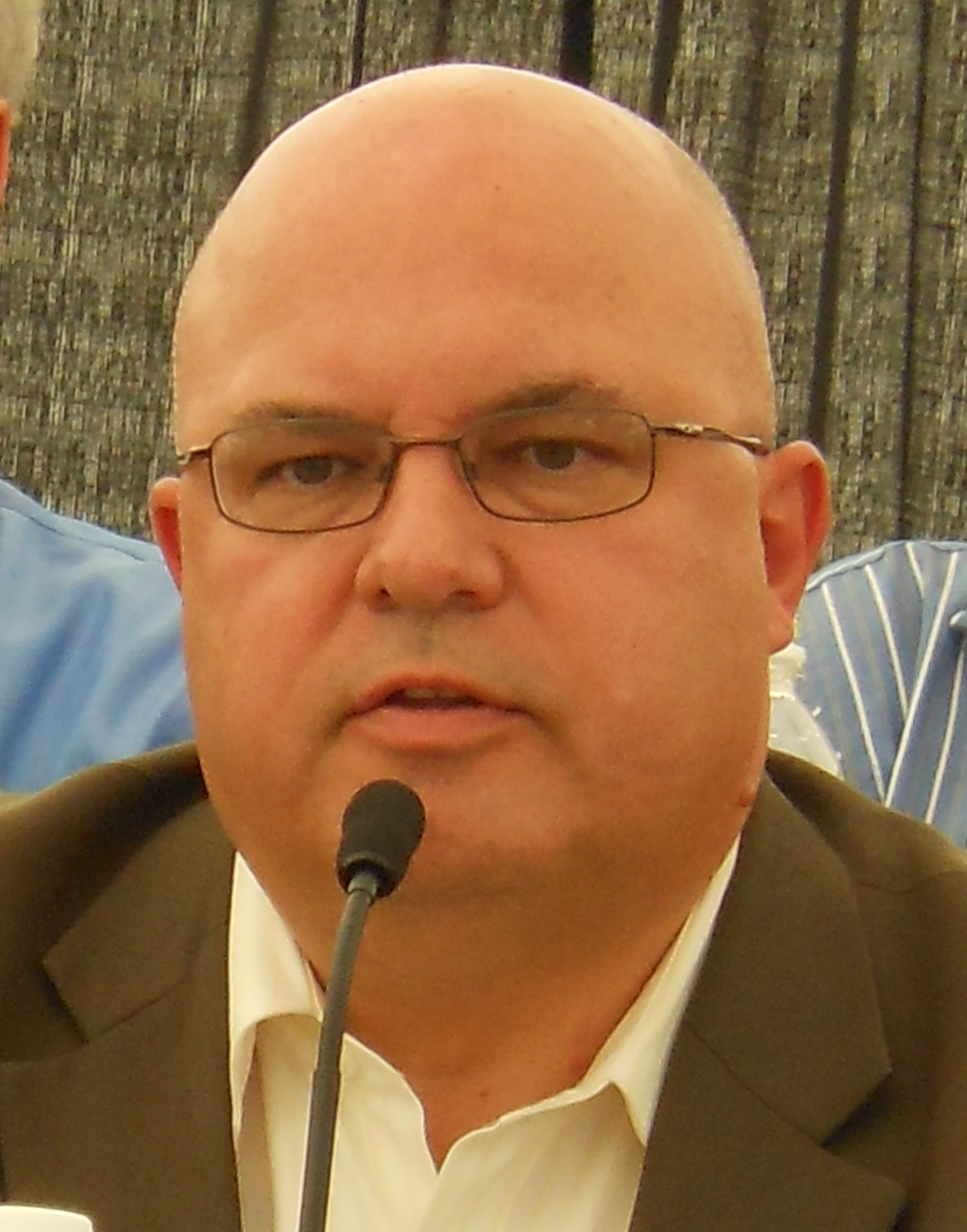

52nd Mayor of Fairbanks
- In office October 24, 2022 – October 27, 2025
- Preceded by: Jim Matherly
- Succeeded by: Mindy O'Neall

Personal details
- Born: 1959 or 1960 (age 66–67) Fairbanks, Alaska, U.S.
- Party: Republican
- Education: California Polytechnic State University (BS)

David Pruhs (December 19, 1959) is an American politician who served as the mayor of Fairbanks, Alaska from 2022 to 2025. Prior to his election as mayor, Pruhs served two terms as a member of Fairbanks' City Council. Pruhs served one three-year term as the 52nd Mayor of Fairbanks before he was defeated for re-election by Democrat Mindy O'Neall in 2025.

== Career ==
Pruhs was born in Fairbanks, and graduated from Monroe Catholic High School before achieving a BS in Business Administration, from California Polytechnic State University in San Luis Obispo. He was Chair of the Fairbanks North Star Borough Planning Commission (2012–2014), before serving two terms as a member of the Fairbanks City Council (2014–2020), concurrently as a member of the Alaska Real Estate Commission from 2016 to 2020.

=== Mayor of Fairbanks ===
In 2022, Pruhs was elected to replace fellow Republican two-term incumbent Jim Matherly who was retiring. In the officially non-partisan election on October 4, 2022, he faced Fairbanks City Council Member Valerie Therrien, and defeated her with 55.9% of the votes.

During his tenure, he received criticism for a Facebook post in April 2025, which stated his opinion that the city operates downtown “for residents… not for visitors”, as a comment on people coming into downtown from villages and shelters. Critics, including Alaska Native organizations like the Tanana Chiefs Conference, said the comments implied a link between Alaska Native people and social problems such as vandalism or disorder and reinforced harmful stereotypes about Native communities. Pruhs subsequently issued a public apology.

In the 2025 mayoral election, Pruhs ran for re-election but was defeated by Democrat Mindy O'Neall who won with approximately 54% of the vote. After conceding, Pruhs suggested that low voter turnout, roughly 15% of eligible voters participated, contributed to his loss.
