= Permafrost: Literary Journal =

American literary journal

- Cover of Volume 30 (2008)
- Editor: Jaclyn Bergamino
- Categories: Literary magazine
- Frequency: Annual
- First issue: Spring 1977
- Based in: Fairbanks, Alaska
- Language: English
- ISSN: 0740-7890

Permafrost is the farthest north literary journal in the United States. Based out of the University of Alaska Fairbanks, Permafrost publishes poetry, fiction, non-fiction, and visual art, and has published interviews with such notable Alaskan writers as Gerri Brightwell, Derick Burleson, and Richard Nelson. Recent cover art has been predominantly influenced by Alaskan culture, highlighting the likes of painter David Mollett and photographer Larry McNeil.

Having celebrated its 30th anniversary in 2008, Permafrost continues to publish notable writers/artists such as Allen Ginsberg, Ilya Kaminsky, and Andy Warhol alongside up and coming writers such as Dan Pinkerton, Billy Thorpe, and Siân Griffiths. More recently, Permafrost has published work by BJ Hollars and Brian Oliu. The journal is staffed by volunteers from the UAF English Department and specifically students of the MFA in Creative Writing program.

== Permafrost Book Prizes ==
Each year the journal sponsors an annual book prize. The winner of the 2010 competition was poet Richard Sonnenmoser for Science-Magic School. Past winners include Briton Shurley (2007), Holly Iglesias (1999), and Laurie O'Brien (1994).

== Circulation and Specs ==
As one of the growing journals in the field, Permafrost's circulation reached 500 copies in 2008. Situated as the farthest north journal, Permafrost publishers are 350 miles from the nearest city, and separated by country borders beyond that. The journal continues to increase its circulation yearly due to swelling online sales, growing interest from libraries, and the continued support of the Alaska State Council on the Arts and the Alaska Humanities Forum.

In 2008, the journal's dimensions were 8.5 by 5 inches, and was 196 pages in length.

== Past Editors ==
1977: Neil Williams	1990: Ellen E. Moore	2001-2: Tom Helleberg, Jenny Lagergren	2022: Courtney Skaggs
1978: Elyse Guttenberg	1991: Steve Baily	2003: Rachael Alonzo	2023: Elizabeth Bolton/Delcenia Cosman
1979: Greg Divers	1992: Sandra Keith, Karen Sylte	2004: Jeff Gaskin	2024: Manuel A. Melendez
1980: Linda Schandelmeier	1993: Kip Knott	2005-6: Steve Goerger	
1981: Harley Stein, Tina Matthews	1994-5: Dafna Rica Ezran	2007: Brian Keenan	
1982: Karl Flaccus, Robert R. Weeden	1996: Julie Filapek, Jennifer Roberts-Luevano	2008: Jamison Klagmann	
1983-4: Roberta Roth Laulicht, David Sims	1997: T.J. O'Donnell	2009: Kyle Mellen	
1985-6: R.H. Ober, Alys Culhane	1998: Tricia Yost, Thomas A. Porter	2010: Jessica Bryant	
1987: Natalie Kusz, Marcia Mason	1999: Sydney Glasoe, David Houston Wood	2011: Sharon Frantz	
1988-9: Robin Lewis	2000: Christian Lybrook	2012: Christie Hinrichs	
2013: Caitlin Scarano	2014: Caitlin Woolley	2015: Jaclyn Bergamino	

== See also ==
- List of literary magazines
