= Kassel (disambiguation) =

Kassel can refer to:

== Places ==
- Kassel, a town in Hesse, Germany
- Landgraviate of Hesse-Kassel
- Electorate of Hesse
- Kassel (region) an administrative region in Germany
- Kassel (district) a district in Germany
- Komarivka, Velyka Mykhailivka Raion, a town in Ukraine formerly known as Kassel
- Cassel, Nord a town in France, known in Dutch as Kassel
- Province of Kurhessen
- KSV Hessen Kassel

== Surnames ==
- Chuck Kassel (born 1903), a former professional American football player
- Josh Kassel (born 1985), an American college ice hockey goaltender
- Karl Kassel (born 1952), a Democrat running for the Alaska House of Representatives from district 7 (Fairbanks)
- Matt Kassel (born 1989), a midfielder for the University of Maryland soccer team
- Nabil Kassel (born 1984), an Algerian boxer best known to win the middleweight gold at the 2007 All-Africa Games
- Philip Kassel (born 1876), an American gymnast and track and field athlete who competed in the 1904 Summer Olympics
- Rudolf Kassel (1926–2020), a German classical philologist
- Tichi Wilkerson Kassel (1926–2004), an American film personality and the publisher of The Hollywood Reporter

== Other uses ==
- Battle of Kassel (1945), a four-day struggle between the U.S. Army and the German Army in April 1945 for Kassel
- Kassel 12, a German glider used for training, developed in the 1920s
- Kassel conversations, the conventional name of an early medieval text preserved in a manuscript from c.810
- Kassel kerb, a concave-section made for buses kerb stone
- Kassel Literary Prize, an annual prize awarded in recognition of "grotesque and comic work" at a high artistic level
- Kassel Nabil (born 1984), a boxer from Algeria
