= Mike Kelly (Alaska politician) =

American politician

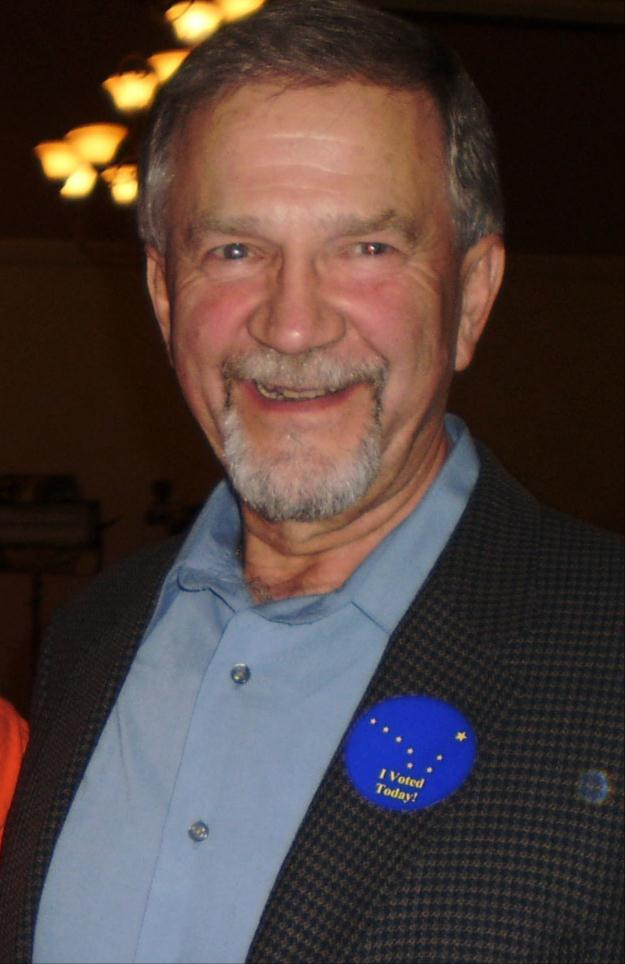
- Kelly in 2010

Member of the Alaska House of Representatives from the 7th district
- In office January 10, 2005 – January 17, 2011
- Preceded by: Hugh Fate
- Succeeded by: Bob Miller

President of the University of Alaska Board of Regents
- In office 1996–1998
- Preceded by: Sharon D. Gagnon
- Succeeded by: Michael J. Burns

Member of the University of Alaska Board of Regents
- In office 1991–1999
- Preceded by: Ruth E. Burnett
- Succeeded by: Brian D. Rogers

Personal details
- Born: Michael Patrick Kelly; May 6, 1942 Tacoma, Washington, U.S.
- Died: December 7, 2016 (aged 74) near Fairbanks, Alaska, U.S.
- Party: Republican
- Spouse: Cherie
- Children: 5
- Education: University of Alaska

Michael Patrick Kelly (May 6, 1942 – December 7, 2016) was a Republican member of the Alaska House of Representatives, representing the 7th District from 2005 until 2011. In the 26th Alaska State Legislature, he served on the Finance Committee, chairing the Corrections and the Natural Resources Finance Subcommittee. He also served on the Fish & Game Finance Subcommittee.

== Prior to politics ==
Mike Kelly was born on May 6, 1942, in Tacoma, Washington, the oldest of seven children of Halford "Hal" and Helen Kelly. Hal Kelly moved to Fairbanks, Alaska, in late 1947; his family moved to Fairbanks the following year. Mike Kelly graduated from Monroe High School in 1960.

Kelly retired as the president and CEO of GVEA in 2000, and was working as a commuter airline pilot for Tanana Air Service at the time of his election to the State House. He served a single term on the University of Alaska Board of Regents, from 1991 to 1999, serving as president of the board from 1996 to 1998.

== Political career ==
Kelly is the oldest brother of Pete Kelly, who represented Fairbanks in the Alaska House from 1995 to 1999, and the Alaska Senate from 1999 to 2003. Mike Kelly ran for an open House seat in 2004, defeating a primary opponent and 3 opponents on the general election ballot. Most of his time in office was spent dealing with solutions to problems brought on by the public employee retirement system in Alaska and the potential for future budget problems due to unfunded liabilities. This angered the old-timer and conservative constituencies who originally voted for him, as he mainly talked about building large-scale development projects. The solution he achieved, which would have resulted in lesser benefits for newer public employees than the ones who came before, also angered the public employee sector. They began to target Kelly for defeat.

=== 2008 campaign ===
In 2008, Kelly faced two primary challengers. He defeated Schaeffer Cox, a 24-year-old carpenter who would later become better known for his involvement in the militia movement, by an approximately 51 to 36 percent margin. In the general election, he was re-elected by only 4 votes against Karl Kassel, who had recently retired as head of parks and recreation for the Fairbanks North Star Borough.

=== 2010 campaign ===
In 2010, he was defeated for reelection by Bob Miller, a former television anchor. Political action committees were formed specifically to oppose Kelly. Advertisements pointing out his actions on the public employee retirement issue, presented in contrast with his own retirement package from Golden Valley Electric Association, were a constant presence during the 2010 campaign season.

== Personal life and death ==
Kelly and his wife Cherie had five children, Roxanne, Shannon, Erin, Cecilia and James, as well as 12 grandchildren. He graduated from Monroe High School in 1960, attended Seattle University from 1960 to 1961, and received his Bachelor of Business Administration degree from the University of Alaska in 1966.

Kelly was killed in the crash of an American Champion Citabria, which he was piloting, on Fort Wainwright near Fairbanks, Alaska, on December 7, 2016.
