= Bob Miller (Alaska politician) =

American journalist and politician

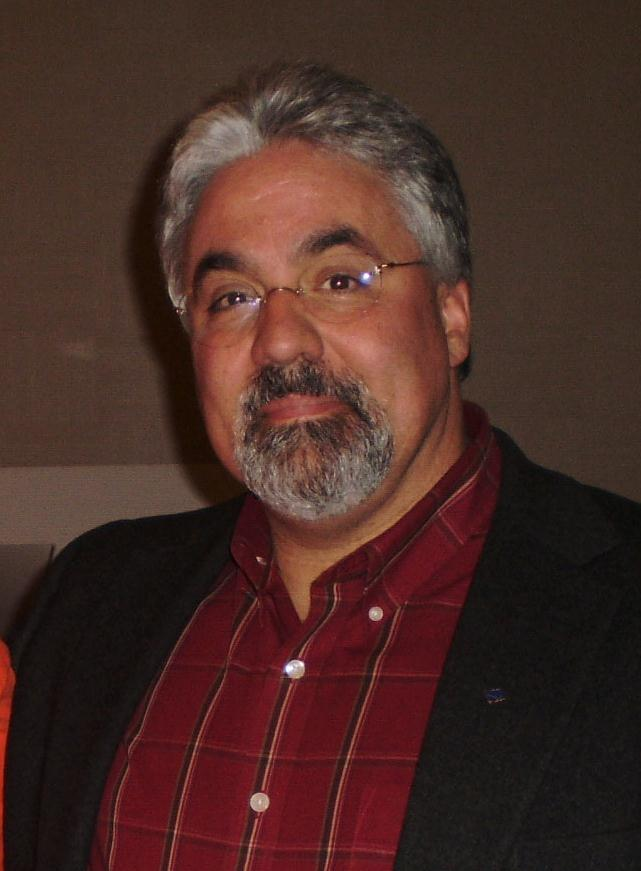

Member of the Alaska House of Representatives from the 7th district
- In office January 24, 2011 – January 28, 2013
- Preceded by: Mike Kelly
- Succeeded by: Tammie Wilson

Personal details
- Born: July 25, 1953 (age 73) Washington, D.C., U.S.
- Party: Democratic
- Spouse: Joni Miller
- Children: 4
- Education: Towson State College (BA)
- Profession: Television anchor

Robert J. "Bob" Miller (born July 25, 1953) is an American journalist, media personality, musician and politician. He was a Democratic member of the Alaska House of Representatives for one term during the 27th Alaska State Legislature. He represented the 7th district which was located in the Fairbanks North Star Borough in Interior Alaska.

== Early life ==
Bob Miller was born on July 25, 1953, in Washington, D.C., and raised in Maryland. He graduated from Bladensburg Senior High School and went on to earn a Bachelor of Arts from Towson State College in 1975. He moved to Fairbanks, Alaska, the hometown of his wife Joni, where he worked as a television anchor and musician. He plays both the guitar and banjo.

== Political career ==
In 2010, Miller defeated incumbent Republican Mike Kelly. He lost his reelection campaign to Republican and fellow incumbent Tammie Wilson.
