= Karl Kassel =

Karl W. Kassel
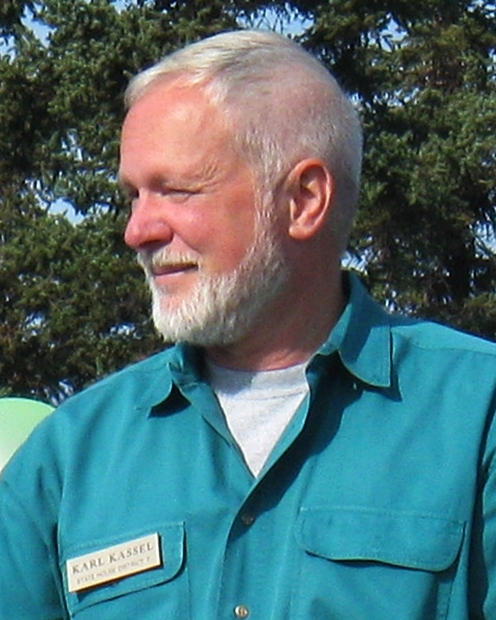
- Kassel in 2008

Mayor of Fairbanks North Star Borough, Alaska
- In office October 2015 – October 2018
- Preceded by: Luke Hopkins
- Succeeded by: Bryce Ward

Personal details
- Born: September 10, 1952 (age 74) Rochester, New York
- Party: Independent
- Spouse: Billie
- Education: Brockport State University
- Profession: Government administrator

Karl W. Kassel (born September 10, 1952) is an American independent politician and former Mayor of Fairbanks North Star Borough, Alaska, serving from 2015 to 2018. He is a retired businessman and government administrator.

== Biography ==
Karl W. Kassel was born in 1952 in Rochester, New York. After graduating from the State University of New York at Brockport with a degree in physical education and a minor in recreation, he moved to Alaska.

Kassel lives "off-the-grid" in a rural corner of the FNSB near the former Murphy Dome Air Force Station. His house, built in 2009 and occupied by Kassel and his family beginning early the following year, was noted for a combination of window placement, solar panels and a heat exchange system, which resulted in little usage of fossil fuel oils to heat the home.

Kassel has traded on the similarity of his name to that of the NPR broadcaster Carl Kasell. He has participated in fundraising efforts for public radio station (and NPR affiliate) KUAC where he offers to record an answering machine or voice mail greeting, similar to the prize offered on Wait Wait... Don't Tell Me! where Kasell records such a greeting.

== Political career ==
=== 2008: Campaign for state house ===
Kassel was unchallenged in the primary and received 1,844 votes. His Republican opponent was Mike Kelly. He lost the election receiving 5,020 votes as opposed to 5,024 for Kelly, a difference of only four votes.

In 2008, following his retirement as parks and recreation director for the Fairbanks North Star Borough (FNSB), Kassel ran for the Alaska House of Representatives from the 7th District, which covers most of the FNSB north of the city of Fairbanks. As the Democratic nominee challenging embattled Republican incumbent Mike Kelly, a bitterly fought campaign led to a close result and a recount of votes. In the end, Kelly would outpoll Kassel by only 4 votes.

=== 2010-present: Fairbanks North Star Borough Assembly ===
Kassel defeated incumbent Guy Sattley, who had served five mostly non-consecutive terms on the body starting in 1990, to claim Seat I. Seat I is a three-year term.

In 2012, Kassel was elected by his fellow Assembly members to serve as the body's presiding officer for the following year.

Kassel ran for borough mayor in 2015 and was elected. He served one term and did not run for a second term. See List of mayors of Fairbanks, Alaska.
