= Grier Hopkins =

American politician (born 1983)

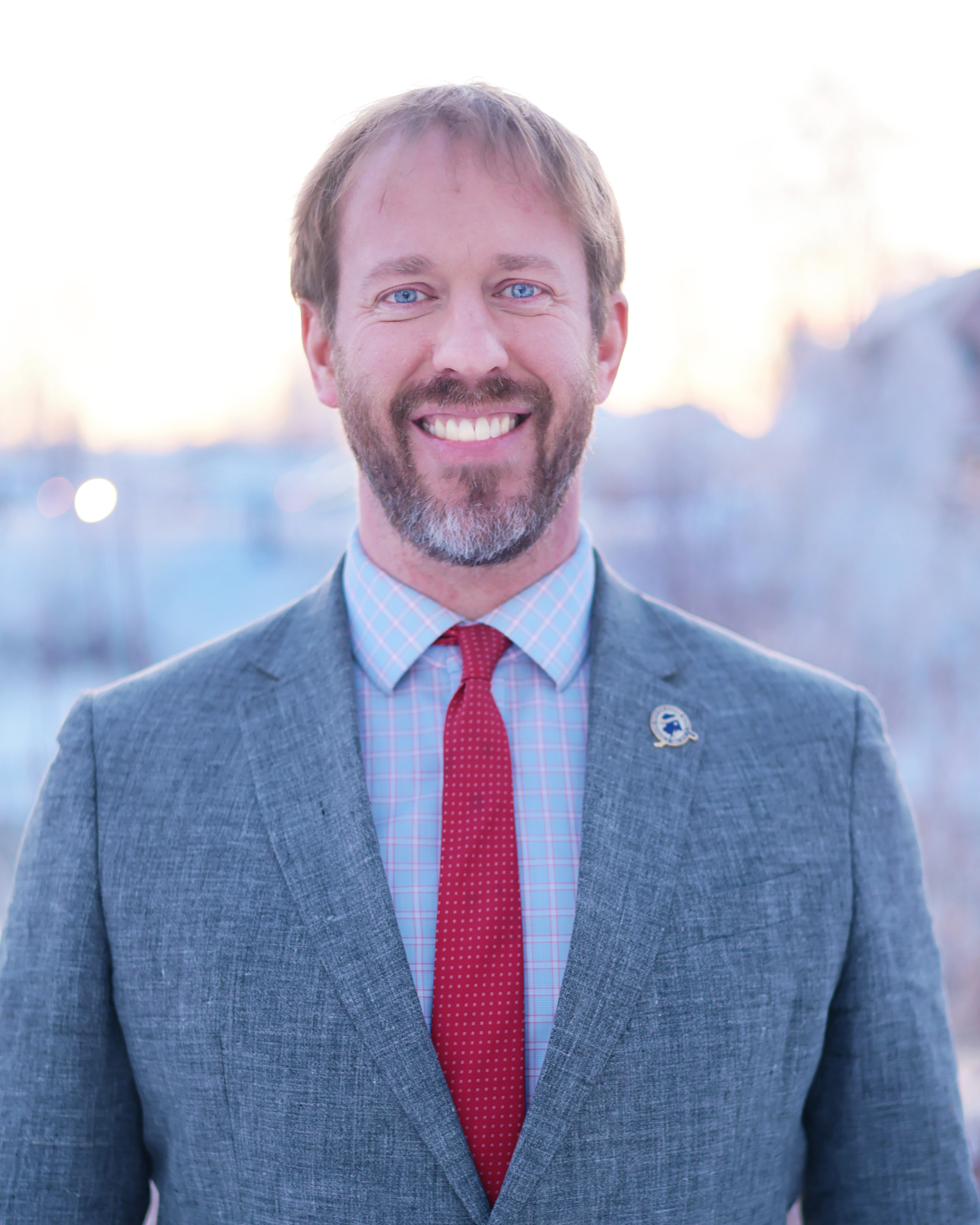
- Mayor Grier Hopkins 2024

Mayor of Fairbanks North Star Borough
- Incumbent
- Assumed office October 27, 2024
- Preceded by: Bryce Ward

Member of the Alaska House of Representatives from the 4th district
- In office January 28, 2019 – January 17, 2023
- Preceded by: David Guttenberg
- Succeeded by: Frank Tomaszewski

Personal details
- Born: Grier Hayden Hopkins; August 15, 1983 (age 42) Fairbanks, Alaska, U.S.
- Party: Democratic
- Spouse: Kristina Miller
- Relations: David Guttenberg (uncle)
- Parents: Luke Hopkins (father); Elyse Guttenberg (mother)

Grier Hayden Hopkins (born August 15, 1983) is an American politician who served as a member of the Alaska House of Representatives from 2019 to 2023. A member of the Democratic Party, he represented the 4th State House district, which covered the northwestern corner of the Fairbanks North Star Borough, including communities north of Fairbanks.

== Career ==
Hopkins won the election on 6 November 2018 from the platform of Democratic Party. He secured 52% of the vote while his closest rival Republican Jim Sackett secured 43%. In October 2024, Hopkins was elected mayor of the Fairbanks North Star Borough.

== Electoral history ==
Alaska's House district 4 election, 2018
Party	Candidate	Votes	%
Democratic	Grier Hopkins	4,356	51.74%
Republican	Jim Sackett	3,650	43.35%
Independent	Tim Lamkin	395	4.69%
Write-in		18	0.21%
Total votes		8,419	100%
Democratic hold			
