= Jim Matherly =

American politician

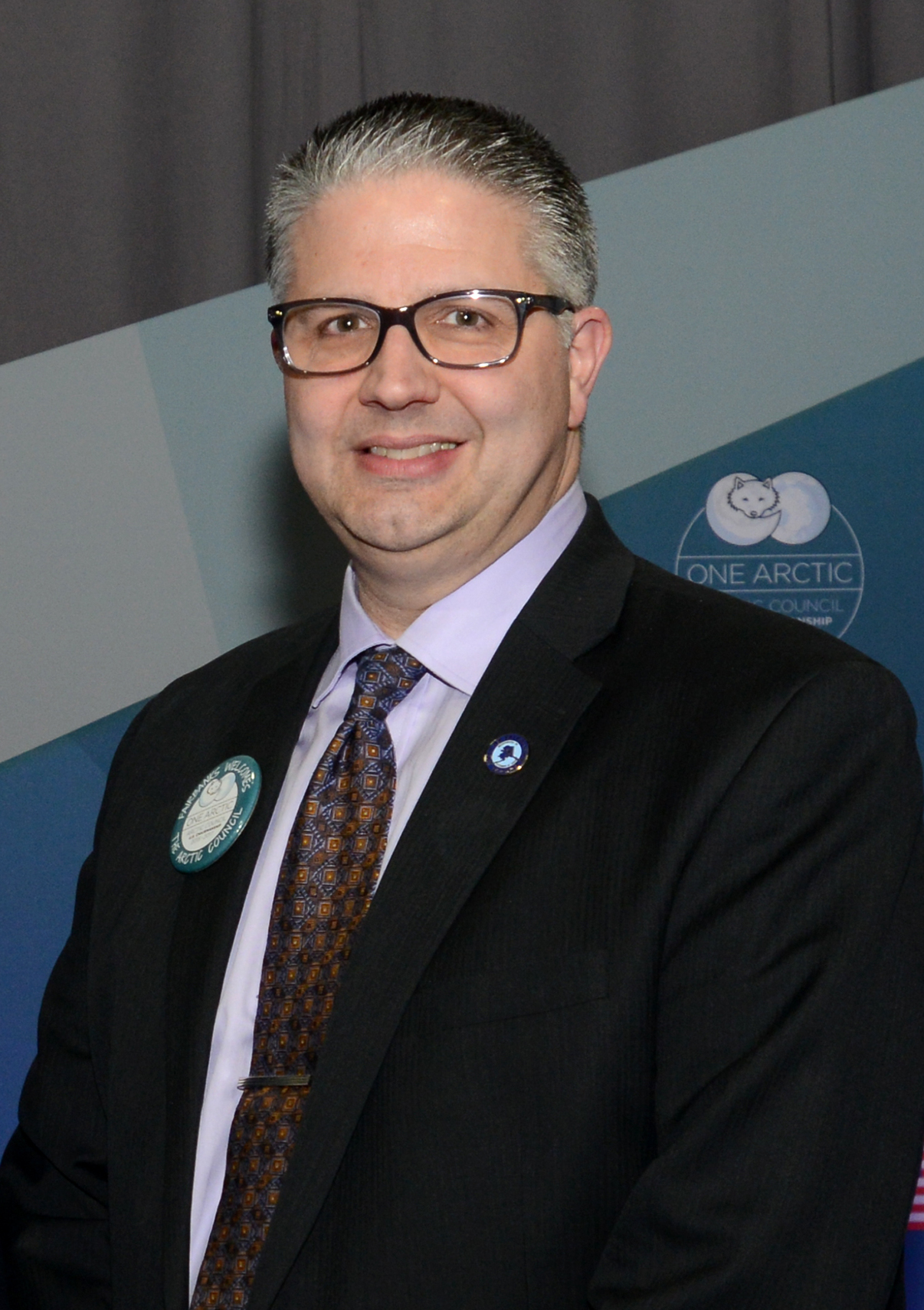
- Mayor Jim Matherly in 2017

Mayor of Fairbanks
- In office October 24, 2016 – October 24, 2022
- Preceded by: John Eberhart
- Succeeded by: David Pruhs

Member of the Fairbanks City Council from Seat D
- In office October 25, 2010 – October 24, 2016
- Preceded by: John Eberhart
- Succeeded by: Jerry Norum

Personal details
- Born: James Henry Matherly Jr. ca. May 1963 (age 61–62); Fairbanks, Alaska
- Political party: Republican
- Relatives: Michael Geraghty (uncle)

Jim Matherly is a former DJ and politician who served as the mayor of Fairbanks, Alaska from 2016 to 2022.

== Career ==
Matherly served two terms on the City Council (2010 - 2016) and was elected Mayor after beating incumbent John Eberhart in the 2016 election. He announced in January 2019 that he would run for reelection in the fall of 2019. He won the October 1 race for re-election in 2019.

In September 2018, then Mayor Matherly posted a meme on his Facebook page mocking Christine Blasey Ford. The meme showed Ford with her hand raised and a caption which read "Believe in something, Even if you can't remember anything," referencing the Nike ad featuring Colin Kaepernick. The post prompted outrage from Fairbanksans. Matherly issued an apology, stating that his girlfriend had posted the meme when he showed her his new iPhone.

After stating support for an LGBTQ+ non-discrimination ordinance, Matherly then vetoed the ordinance several days after it was approved by City Council. Ordinance 6093 would have prohibited discrimination against people based on their gender or sexual orientation, in employment, housing and public spaces.

In 2022, Matherly was appointed as the Fairbanks Director of the Office of the Governor. In a 2023 interview, Matherly described the position as akin to being the mayor without being elected into the position.
