= David Guttenberg =

American politician (born 1951)

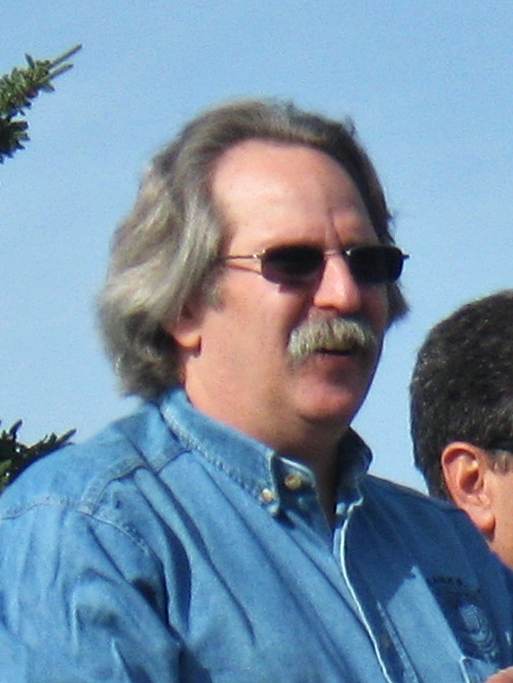

Member of the Alaska House of Representatives
- In office January 21, 2003 – January 15, 2019
- Preceded by: John Davies
- Succeeded by: Grier Hopkins
- Constituency: 8th district (2003-2013); 38th district (2013-2015); 4th district (2015-2019)

Personal details
- Born: May 26, 1951 (age 75) New York City, New York, U.S.
- Party: Democratic
- Spouse: Marilyn (deceased 2013)
- Relations: Grier Hopkins (nephew)
- Education: Pennsylvania Academy of Fine Arts
- Occupation: Politician, peony farmer
- Profession: Construction worker (retired)

David Guttenberg (born May 26, 1951) is an American politician serving as a member of the Fairbanks North Star Borough Assembly. A member of the Democratic Party, he was a member of the Alaska House of Representatives from 2003 to 2019, after which his nephew, Grier Hopkins, succeeded him.

Guttenberg missed much of the legislative session in 2013 due to the illness of his wife Marilyn, who died on October 7 that year.
