= Going Rouge =

Collection of essays about Sarah Palin

Going Rouge: Sarah Palin, An American Nightmare
- The cover was made as a spoof of Sarah Palin's similarly titled memoir.
- Author: Edited by Richard Kim and Betsy Reed
- Language: English
- Genre: US politics
- Publisher: OR Books
- Publication date: November 17, 2009
- Publication place: United States
- Media type: Print (paperback) & Ebook
- Pages: 240
- ISBN: 978-0-9842950-0-5

Going Rouge: Sarah Palin, An American Nightmare is a collection of essays about Sarah Palin with a spoof title and book cover design intended to lampoon Palin's memoir Going Rogue: An American Life. It was released on November 17, 2009. Both books feature Palin on the front in red, but Going Rouge has her against a backdrop of black thunder clouds and lightning, instead of the blue sky and white clouds on her memoir.

The anthology, according to its publisher OR Books, provides a political counterpoint and addresses Palin's background, her rise to prominence, and "the nightmarish prospect of her continuing to dominate the nation's political scene."

The book is unrelated in content to Going Rouge: The Sarah Palin Rogue Coloring & Activity Book, a 48-page paperback by cartoonist Julie Sigwart and radio host Micheal Stinson, or to Going Rouge: A Candid Look inside the Mind of Political Conservative Sarah Palin, a novelty book of 102 blank pages.

== Content ==
The book, released by OR Books, a start-up founded by veteran publishers John G. H. Oakes and Colin Robinson, was published on November 17, 2009, the same day that Palin's own hardback Going Rogue: An American Life was released. According to their site, Oakes is the former publisher of the independent publishing house Four Walls Eight Windows, and Robinson a former publisher of The New Press.

Other contributing writers include Max Blumenthal, Joe Conason, Eve Ensler, Michelle Goldberg, Jane Hamsher, Christopher Hayes, Jim Hightower, Linda Hirshman, Dahlia Lithwick, Amanda Marcotte, Shannyn Moore, Jeanne Devon, John Nichols, Hanna Rosin, Matt Taibbi, Michael Tomasky, Rebecca Traister, Naomi Klein, Jessica Valenti, Patricia Williams, JoAnn Wypijewski, and Gary Younge.

Salon magazine also announced that several of their original articles will be included: "The Sarah Palin Pity Party," by Rebecca Traister; "The Losers Who Gave Us Sarah Palin," by Joe Conason; and two pieces by Juan Cole, "What's the Difference Between Sarah Palin and Muslim Fundamentalists? Lipstick" and "Sarah Palin, meet Mahmoud Ahmadinejad." Some of the other more than 50 short essays, includes "Wrong Woman, Wrong Message," by Gloria Steinem, "Our Polar Bears, Ourselves," by Mark Hertsgaard, and "Sarah Palin's Death Panels" by Robert Reich. Max Blumenthal, author of Republican Gomorrah (2009), includes an account of his meeting with Palin's "witch-hunting pastor" from Kenya, Thomas Muthee, "who urges his parishioners to crush 'the python spirit' of the unbeliever enemies by stomping on their necks."

An additional component in Going Rouge is how "feminist considerations" were "magnified and distorted" by Palin's candidacy. The varied and "complex nuances of gender and feminist constructions raised by the Palin phenomenon" are addressed by Katha Pollitt, Amy Alexander, Amanda Fortini and Emily Bazelon, among others.

== Publication and promotion ==
Palin's book on the left shown next to Going Rouge on the right

The cover is a parody of hers and it certainly takes some shots and mocks Sarah Palin, but it is a very serious book and the book itself is not a parody. It is not at all intended as a joke or a parody.

— Richard Kim, senior editor at The Nation

OR Books cofounder Colin Robinson announced that they intended to promote the book with a web video by documentary filmmaker Robert Greenwald, which they planned to "send around virally" leading up to the November 17 release date. Customers wanting the book would initially only have two choices, to order the book as an ebook download for $10 or order a print-on-demand paperback for $16. Such low production costs Robinson believed would allow OR to promote the book heavily on the Internet, with perhaps some print advertising as well. Afterwards, OR Books hoped to entertain offers from reprint houses looking to buy the paperback rights. The book was eventually released on Amazon, achieving a sales rank of #825 in books for the week of December 14, 2009 and dropping to #7,309 for the week of January 29, 2010 (Going Rogue, in contrast, was #58 that same week).

Various news sources, including CNN and Fox News, have confused Going Rouge and Going Rogue in articles intended to discuss Palin's memoir.

== Critical reception ==
Writer Geoffrey Dunn, author of The Lies of Sarah Palin: The Untold Story Behind Her Relentless Quest for Power, gave the book a favorable review, describing it as "full of golden nuggets." Dunn concluded his remarks by stating "One thing is certain: You will read far more about the real Sarah Palin in Going Rouge than you ever will in her own memoirs, being published by who else? Rupert Murdoch."

A reviewer writing in the San Francisco Chronicle said that the book contains "articles by some of the most thought provoking writers in America who have chronicled the foibles and pratfalls of Sarah Palin."
