= Saturday Night Live parodies of Sarah Palin =

Television comedy sketches

Tina Fey as Sarah Palin (left) and Amy Poehler as Hillary Clinton (right) in their first sketch, "A Nonpartisan Message from Governor Sarah Palin & Senator Hillary Clinton"

The sketch comedy television show Saturday Night Live aired several critically acclaimed sketches parodying then Alaskan governor and vice presidential nominee Sarah Palin in the lead-up to the 2008 United States presidential election. The sketches featured former cast member Tina Fey, who returned as a guest star to portray Palin. Fey won the Primetime Emmy Award for Outstanding Guest Actress in a Comedy Series for her impersonation of Palin.

== Background ==
Soon after the 2008 John McCain presidential campaign's August 29, 2008, announcement that Alaska governor Sarah Palin would be McCain's vice presidential nominee, several people noted a physical resemblance between comedian Tina Fey and Palin.

Viewers speculated who would play Palin on SNL during the run up to the November 4 presidential election. Days before the broadcast of the sketch, SNL executive producer Lorne Michaels said "there are [ongoing] discussions" about Fey playing Palin. On September 13, 2008, NBC announced that Fey would appear in the thirty-fourth-season premiere.

== "A Nonpartisan Message from Governor Sarah Palin & Senator Hillary Clinton" ==
The first sketch, "A Nonpartisan Message from Governor Sarah Palin & Senator Hillary Clinton," aired during the thirty-fourth season premiere of SNL on September 13, 2008. The sketch starred Tina Fey and Amy Poehler as Palin and Clinton respectively. Fey, the series' former head writer and repertory player, made her third appearance on the series since officially leaving SNL in 2006 to work on 30 Rock, a series which she created. The sketch was written by head writer and Weekend Update anchor Seth Meyers with added jokes by Poehler and Fey. A famous line from the sketch, "I can see Russia from my house." was written by SNL producer Mike Shoemaker.

Poehler and Fey are featured in a fictional speech playing New York Senator Hillary Rodham Clinton and Alaskan Governor Sarah Palin, respectively. The pair discuss the presence of sexism in the 2008 United States presidential election, and the differences between Palin and Clinton. Governor Palin was the Republican Party vice-presidential nominee and Senator Clinton was a contender for the Democratic Party presidential nomination. Through the course of the message, Palin tries to present herself as the candidate for the job, and Clinton gets progressively more and more disgusted at Palin's sudden rise to fame as John McCain's running mate, despite her background. It also features references to Clinton's campaign.

=== Reaction ===
==== Critical reception ====
The sketch was well received by critics. Erin Fox of TV Guide wrote that Tina Fey "nails [Sarah] Palin's mannerisms and accent. [Amy] Poehler is amazing as Hillary [Clinton]; her timing is better than ever. My favorite line was Tina saying 'I can see Russia from my house!'" Fox added that "this was a much anticipated and hoped-for pairing and we got it!" Annie Wu of TV Squad thought that Fey's "impression wasn't perfect but it was more accurate than Amy Poehler's Hillary Clinton, which [she] still find[s] incredibly off." Wu added that "the mugging for the camera was absolutely hilarious." James Poniewozik of Time Magazine wrote that "Fey's Palin was perfectly good enough" and that "the skit itself did a good job of what SNL—which has lately cultivated a strong set of female comics—tried hard to do through Hillary's campaign, which is try to address sexism without either simply going for the easy stereotypes or letting female candidates off the hook." The Huffington Post's reviewer wrote that "Fey bears a striking resemblance to Palin and nailed the candidate's distinctive accent."

==== Palin's response ====
When asked how she felt about Fey's portrayal, Palin herself replied, "I watched with the volume all the way down and I thought it was hilarious... I didn't hear a word she said, but the visual was spot on." Palin "and the press corps watched the sketch in the back of her plane, laughing at Tina and Amy's satirical take on the two politicians," and Palin later claimed that she had once dressed up as Fey for Halloween. However, Carly Fiorina, a spokeswoman for the John McCain campaign argued that the sketch portrayed Hillary Clinton as "very substantive," but Fiorina thought, in the case of Sarah Palin, that she was portrayed as "totally superficial." Fiorina thought the sketch was "disrespectful in the extreme" and "sexist."

In a series of interviews, Palin made some "flubs" leading her to joke that "[she] was just trying to give Tina Fey more material." She also joked that it was to provide "job security for SNL characters." Palin later remarked that she should appear on SNL to spoof a series of American Express commercials which featured Tina Fey.

== Further Palin sketches ==
Due to the popularity of the sketch and Fey's impression of Palin, Fey reprised her role during the September 27, 2008 episode. That sketch featured Palin being interviewed by Katie Couric (also portrayed by Amy Poehler), and parodied an interview which took place between Palin and Couric which aired days before the sketch's broadcast. In the sketch, Fey quoted near verbatim one of Palin's answers from the actual interview and mimed Palin's gestures. The following episode featured a skit parodying the debate between Palin and Joe Biden (played by Jason Sudeikis). Queen Latifah also appeared in the skit as moderator Gwen Ifill.

Palin herself appeared on the October 18, 2008 episode, along with Fey in the cold opening, and in the Weekend Update segment. Alec Baldwin and Mark Wahlberg also appeared in that sketch as themselves. On the October 23 episode of Saturday Night Live Weekend Update Thursday, Fey as Palin appeared alongside Darrell Hammond as John McCain and Will Ferrell as President George W. Bush.

On November 1, 2008, Fey once again portrayed Palin, this time in a sketch featuring the real John McCain, the last of numerous sketches featuring the Arizona Senator. In the sketch, McCain poked fun at himself and his campaign, as well as Barack Obama's purchase of airtime on several major networks earlier in the week. In the sketch, McCain and Palin can only afford to buy airtime on QVC, a home-shopping channel. McCain's wife, Cindy, also made an appearance in the sketch as herself.

After Palin's memoir, Going Rogue: An American Life, achieved best-seller status through pre-orders, Fey announced she would resume impersonating the former Governor despite having "retired" the act months previously. On April 10, 2010, Fey hosted SNL, and once again played Palin, who unveiled her own television network featuring shows such as Hey Journalist, I Gotcha, Todd! starring her husband Todd Palin (Jason Sudeikis) and Are You Smarter than a Half-Term Governor? Fey hosted SNL in May 2011 while pregnant. A new sketch was made in which parodies of Mitt Romney (Jason Sudeikis), Newt Gingrich (Bobby Moynihan), Michele Bachmann (Kristen Wiig), Palin (Fey), Donald Trump (Darrell Hammond), and Jimmy McMillan (Kenan Thompson) fought in a Republican Party debate between undeclared candidates, with Shepard Smith (Bill Hader) coordinating.

On March 11, 2012, on the episode hosted by Jonah Hill, Palin was impersonated by Andy Samberg in the Weekend Update segment. The dialogue leads the audience to think that it was supposed to be another appearance by Fey and that Seth Meyers wasn't aware of the change, but Samberg convinces Meyers to finish his part.

Palin appeared on the Saturday Night Live 40th Anniversary Special, where Jerry Seinfeld jokingly mistook her for Tina Fey.

Fey and Poehler co-hosted SNL on December 19, 2015, and performed as Palin and Clinton, transported through time from 2008, in yet another sketch that also featured Kate McKinnon's portrayal of Clinton. For their performance, the duo won the Emmy Award for Outstanding Guest Actress in a Comedy Series; this was Fey's second win in the category for her performance as Palin and Poehler's first Emmy win after 18 nominations. This was also the first time an acting category had been won by more than one person.

In January 2016, following Palin's real-life endorsement of Donald Trump, Fey returned to the role to parody the speech given by Palin in Iowa that endorsed Trump. This skit served as the show's cold open.
