= Deluge: Gaza and Israel from Crisis to Cataclysm =

2024 book

Deluge: Gaza and Israel From Crisis to Cataclysm
- Author: Jamie Stern-Weiner
- Publisher: OR Books
- Publication date: 2024

Deluge: Gaza and Israel from Crisis to Cataclysm is a 2024 book edited by Jamie Stern-Weiner.
