= OR Books =

American publisher

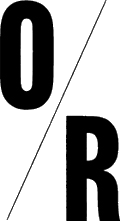
- Founded: 2009; 16 years ago
- Founder: John Oakes and Colin Robinson
- Country of origin: United States
- Headquarters location: New York City, New York
- Distribution: Consortium Book Sales
- Publication types: Books
- Official website: www.orbooks.com

OR Books is a New York City-based independent publishing house founded by John Oakes and Colin Robinson in 2009. The company sells digital and print-on-demand books directly to the customer and focuses on creative promotion through traditional media and the Internet. On its site, OR Books states that it "embraces progressive change in politics, culture and the way we do business."

Not long after its founding in 2009, OR Books became known for publishing Going Rouge: Sarah Palin, An American Nightmare, a parody of Palin's autobiography Going Rogue: An American Life. Going Rouge became a best-seller as per The New York Times. Since then, the company has published books by Julian Assange, Moustafa Bayoumi, Medea Benjamin, Patrick Cockburn, Sue Coe, Simon Critchley, Lisa Dierbeck, Ariel Dorfman, Norman Finkelstein, Laura Flanders, Chris Lehmann, Gordon Lish, Bill McKibben, Eileen Myles, Yoko Ono, Barney Rosset, Douglas Rushkoff, Elissa Shevinsky, Burhan Sönmez, Jeanne Thornton, Slavoj Žižek, and others.

== Founders ==
According to OR's website, John Oakes co-founded the publishing company Four Walls Eight Windows and was subsequently publisher of Thunder's Mouth Press and co-publisher of Nation Books. He is publisher of the Evergreen Review. Colin Robinson, a former senior editor at Scribner, was previously managing director of Verso Books and publisher of The New Press.

== Joint ventures ==
In September 2010, OR Books announced a partnership with a writers' collective known as Mischief & Mayhem, whose members include Dale Peck, Lisa Dierbeck, Joshua Furst, DW Gibson, and Choire Sicha.

In what the industry newsblog Shelf Awareness termed a "very significant...move," St. Mark’s Bookshop and OR Books announced a joint venture to enable the store’s customers to buy select books on OR’s list from the bookstore’s website.

In April 2016, OR Books acquired UK publishing company Serif, following the death in 2015 of its founder Stephen Hayward, a former associate of Robinson's.

In May 2016, OR Books and Counterpoint Press announced a partnership whereby Counterpoint would put several OR titles into stores.
