= Technocreep =

2014 book by Thomas P. Keenan

Technocreep: The Surrender of Privacy and the Capitalization of Intimacy
- Author: Thomas P. Keenan
- Publisher: OR Books
- Publication date: 2014

Technocreep: The Surrender of Privacy and the Capitalization of Intimacy is a 2014 book by Thomas P. Keenan, an adjunct professor of computer science at the University of Calgary.

The book includes tips about how to increase one's personal privacy, and how to catch companies selling one's data.

Technocreep was a recommended book for the secondary schools of British Columbia during the 2015-2016 academic year, and was also recommended by the Office of the Information and Privacy Commissioner of British Columbia.

== Reception ==
The Daily Californian described the book as having an "Atwoodian flavor". The Rumpus said "Keenan lays out the evidence calmly, methodically and without polemics." Quill & Quire called it a "companion guide" to life in a post-Snowden world.

The book was a featured topic on Science for the People.
