= Arshia Sattar =

Indian translator and writer (born 1960)

Arshia Sattar (born 1960) is an Indian translator and writer.

Sattar obtained her PhD in South Asian Languages and Civilizations from the University of Chicago in 1990. Her doctoral advisor was Wendy Doniger, a renowned Indologist. Her abridged translations of the epic Sanskrit texts, Kathasaritsagara and Valmiki's Ramayana have both been published by Penguin Books. Her book reviews and articles appear regularly in The Times of India, The Illustrated Weekly of India and the Indian Review of Books.

She has also worked with documentary film and theatre. Most recently, she taught Indian Studies at the Mahindra United World College of India in Pune for five years. She currently works as a freelance writer and researcher. She was previously the programming director at OpenSpace, an NGO committed to promoting awareness of issues such as globalization. She has also been a visiting lecturer at Middlebury College, teaching courses on Indian cinema and cultural politics. In 2005, Sattar was the program director for the Rangashankara theater festival in Bengaluru. She also sometimes lectures at the National Institute of Design, Ahmedabad, India, and the Srishti School of Art Design and Technology, Bangalore, India where she gives a week-long class on Indian narrative.

Arshia Sattar along with DW Gibson co-founded the Sangam House Writing residency in 2008. This is the first and only fully funded writer's residency in India.

== Bibliography ==
- Sattar, Arshia (1994). Tales from the Kathāsaritsāgara. Penguin Books. ISBN 978-0140247213.
- Sattar, Arshia (1996). The Rāmāyaṇa by Vālmīki. Viking. ISBN 978-0-14-029866-6.
- Sattar, Arshia (2014). Adventures with Hanuman. Rupa Publications India. ISBN 978-8129129345.
- Sattar, Arshia (2018-05-08). Ramayana. Restless Books. ISBN 978-1-63206-177-5. OCLC 993684661.
- Sattar, Arshia (2019). Uttara: The Book of Answers. Harper Collins India. ISBN 978-9353572594.
- Sattar, Arshia (2019). Lost Loves: Exploring Rama's Anguish. Harper Collins India. ISBN 978-9353572617.
- Sattar, Arshia (2020). Maryada: Searching for Dharma in the Ramayana. Harper Collins India. ISBN 978-9353577124.
