= Good Tidings and Great Joy =

2013 book by Sarah Palin

Good Tidings and Great Joy: Protecting the Heart of Christmas
- Author: Sarah Palin
- Language: English
- Subject: Christmas
- Published: 2013
- Publication place: United States
- Preceded by: America by Heart: Reflections on Family, Faith, and Flag
- Followed by: Sweet Freedom: A Devotional

Good Tidings and Great Joy: Protecting the Heart of Christmas is a 2013 book by Sarah Palin that became a New York Times Bestseller. The book makes "an emphatic case for the true meaning of Christmas." The title of the book is an allusion to Luke 2:10 in the New Testament. Palin promoted the book with a 15-city tour. According to Publishers Weekly, the book sold 209,591 copies in 2013.
