= America by Heart =

2010 book by Sarah Palin

America by Heart: Reflections on Family, Faith, and Flag
- Author: Sarah Palin
- Language: English
- Subject: Politics and government
- Genre: Biography
- Publisher: HarperCollins
- Publication date: November 23, 2010
- Publication place: United States
- Media type: Hardcover (large print and audiobook available)
- Pages: 272
- ISBN: 978-0-06-201096-4
- OCLC: 649799997
- Preceded by: Going Rogue: An American Life
- Followed by: Good Tidings and Great Joy

America by Heart: Reflections on Family, Faith, and Flag is the second book by Sarah Palin. It was released on November 23, 2010, and has been described as containing selections from Palin's favorite speeches, sermons, and inspirational works, as well as vignettes about Americans she met in the fall of 2009 while on her book tour for Going Rogue: An American Life. One million copies were printed for the first run, and a digital edition has been available since the release. She embarked on a 16-city book tour in America's "heartland" that began on November 23, 2010. The book made number two on The New York Times Best Seller list during its second week of release. America by Heart was the fifth best-selling nonfiction book of 2010, according to Publishers Weekly, with 797,955 copies sold.

== Pre-publication controversy ==
Several days before the book's release, the website Gawker published excerpts in which Palin criticized Levi Johnston (the father of her grandchild), the TV show American Idol, Hollywood filmmakers, Michelle Obama, Barack Obama, the Obamas' former pastor Jeremiah Wright, and John F. Kennedy for the speech he made about his religion while campaigning for president in 1960. Palin posted the following message on her Twitter page:

The publishing world is LEAKING out-of-context excerpts of my book w/out my permission? Isn't that illegal?

Within 48 hours, Palin's publisher had sued Gawker for copyright violations and had obtained a federal court order requiring Gawker to remove the material from its website, despite Gawker Media's claim of fair use. The American Spectator called the legal action a "huge victory".

On November 20, 2010, Palin published her own "Exclusive Sneak Peek" of the book on her Facebook page. On the day the book was officially released, The Guardian printed extracts from the book on American values, criticism of Barack Obama and his health care legislation, criticism of Levi Johnston and the younger generation.

== Reviews ==
Human Events magazine describes the book as patriotic and optimistic in tone and as bringing life to words from historical figures such as Ronald Reagan, John F. Kennedy and Abigail Adams.

Townhall columnist Katie Pavlich recommends the book to "any American who believes in faith, family, love of country and even history". She describes the book as having a personal touch but as emphasizing faith-guided conservative principles much more than Palin's earlier book, Going Rogue.

Amanda Marcotte's review in the Guardian claims that America by Heart is divisive and succeeds in "stoking the feelings of resentment in her target audience against the usual cadre of villains," while containing a subtext which implies that white fundamentalist Christians are the real Americans and that America is the only nation with the right to having feelings of "exceptionalism."

The New York Times says the book is full of the patriotic reflections promised by the title, but it is also a road map to the political attacks Palin would make on Barack Obama if she were to run for U.S. president in 2012.
