= Palin–Couric interviews =

2008 US presidential election interviews

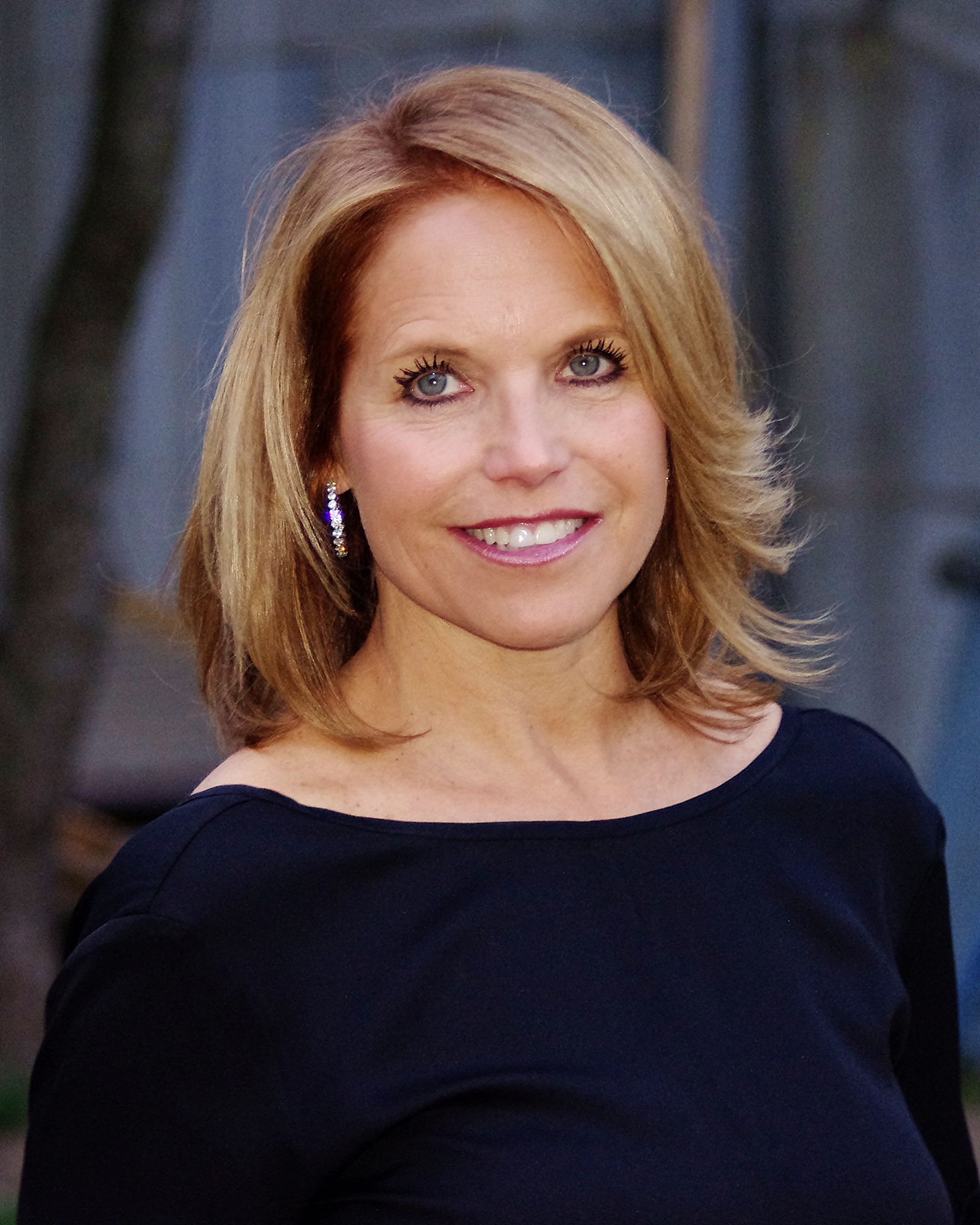
Katie Couric conducted a multiple-part interview with Sarah Palin in September 2008

In the run-up to the 2008 United States presidential election, Republican vice presidential nominee Sarah Palin was interviewed multiple times by CBS Evening News anchor Katie Couric. The interviews were broadcast on September 24 and 25, 2008. Couric received the Alfred I. duPont–Columbia University Award and the Walter Cronkite Award for Journalism Excellence for the interview.

The interviews were widely seen as a disaster for Palin's image and for the McCain campaign, and were cited by many as the cause of a turning of the tide of public opinion against her.

== Origins ==
The Couric interview was preceded by heavy media scrutiny over the McCain campaign's alleged unwillingness to allow press access to Palin.

Palin's account in her memoirs states that Nicolle Wallace, a senior McCain staffer, pushed for Couric and the CBS Evening News. "The campaign's general strategy involved coming out with a network anchor, someone they felt had treated John well on the trail thus far. My suggestion was that we be consistent with that strategy and start talking to outlets like FOX and the Wall Street Journal. I really didn't have a say in which press I was going to talk to, but for some reason Nicolle seemed compelled to get me on the Katie bandwagon," wrote Palin.

"Katie really likes you," Wallace said according to Palin. "She's a working mom and admires you as a working mom. She has teenage daughters like you. She just relates to you. ... Believe me, I know her very well. I've worked with her. ... She just has such low self-esteem. ... She just feels she can't trust anybody. She wants you to like her. You know what? We'll schedule a segment with her, if it doesn't go well, if there's no chemistry, we won't do any others."

Wallace disputed Palin's account. "The whole notion there was a conversation where I tried to cajole her into a conversation with Katie [Couric] is fiction". Wallace earlier had praised the channel, "We had no input on usage ... we had no ground rules on the interview. I think that's pretty unprecedented. A lot of people negotiate platforms. We didn't negotiate platforms or air dates."

"We were initially supposed to interview her—sit down with her in Philadelphia on Sunday and travel with Senator McCain and Governor Palin on that Monday," Couric recalled. "And then the campaign felt they didn't want a week to go by without hearing anything from Governor Palin because they were doling out the interviews very selectively. So they decided when she was visiting some world leaders at the UN, that that would be an opportunity for her to sit down that morning and talk to me and it was very serendipitous for us, because we could—that opened the door to a lot of interesting foreign policy questions. And, also, in addition to that, the 2008 financial crisis was sort of really heating up during that week, so that was another opportunity. Then, we had scheduled an interview the following Monday, during which we were going to talk about a lot of domestic and social issues, so they gave us tremendous access."

Newsweek reported that at the time of the Couric interview, Palin felt that she had been overmanaged for her first one-on-one debut with a network anchor, Charlie Gibson of ABC, and "rebuffed Wallace's help with her Couric interview." McCain advisers said that Palin "did not have the time or focus to prepare for the interview." "She did not say, 'I will not prepare,'" a McCain adviser said. "She just didn't have a bandwidth to do a mock interview session the way we had prepared before. She was just overloaded."

== Format ==
CBS News producers segmented key moments from the interviews over the course of several days and on multiple formats, including The Early Show, the Evening News, and the Internet. The New York Observer noted that this "prolonged the interviews' saliency in the news cycle," and Bill Kristol, a Fox News Channel commentator who was a prominent supporter of Palin, referred to the network's "seemingly never-ending installments" as a "nine-thousand-part interview."

The initial 40-minute session aired September 24 and 25, 2008. Palin and Couric discussed Rick Davis and the economy. Palin defended her comments on how Alaska's proximity to Russia enhanced her foreign policy experience:

COURIC: You've cited Alaska's proximity to Russia as part of your foreign-policy experience. What did you mean by that?

PALIN: That Alaska has a very narrow maritime border between a foreign country, Russia, and on our other side, the land—boundary that we have with—Canada. It, it's funny that a comment like that was—kind of made to cari—I don't know. You know. Reporters—

COURIC: Mocked?

PALIN: Yeah, mocked, I guess that's the word, yeah.

COURIC: Explain to me why that enhances your foreign policy credentials.

PALIN: Well, it certainly does because our— our next door neighbors are foreign countries. They're in the state that I am the executive of. And there in Russia—

COURIC: Have you ever been involved with any negotiations, for example, with the Russians?

PALIN: We have trade missions back and forth. We— we do— it's very important when you consider even national security issues with Russia as Putin rears his head and comes into the air space of the United States of America, where— where do they go? It's Alaska. It's just right over the border. It is— from Alaska that we send those out to make sure that an eye is being kept on this very powerful nation, Russia, because they are right there. They are right next to— to our state.

Couric asked Palin her opinion on the emergency economic bailout the Bush administration was proposing:

COURIC: Why isn't it better, Governor Palin, to spend $700 billion helping middle-class families, who are struggling with healthcare, housing, gas and groceries, allow them to spend more and put more money into the economy instead of helping these big financial institutions that played a role in creating this mess?

PALIN: That's why I say, I, like every American I'm speaking with, we're ill about this position that we have been put in where it is the tax payers looking to bail out, but ultimately, what the bailout does is help those who are concerned about the healthcare reform that is needed to help shore up our economy, helping tho— it's got to be all about job creation too, shoring up our economy, and putting it back on the right track, so healthcare reform and reducing taxes and reining in spending has got to accompany tax reductions and tax relief for Americans. And trade, we've got to see trade as opportunity, not as— competitive— scary thing, but one in five jobs being created in the trade sector today, we've got to look at that as more opportunity. All those things under the umbrella of job creation. This bailout is a part of that.

In another segment aired on September 30, Couric asked Palin about her taste in periodicals:

COURIC: And when it comes to establishing your world view, I was curious, what newspapers and magazines did you regularly read before you were tapped for this—to stay informed and to understand the world?

PALIN: I've read most of them again with a great appreciation for the press, for the media, coming f—

COURIC: But like which ones specifically? I'm curious that you—

PALIN: Um, all of 'em, any of 'em that, um, have, have been in front of me over all these years. Um, I have a va—

COURIC: Can you name a few?

PALIN: I have a vast variety of sources where we get our news too. Alaska isn't a foreign country, where, it's kind of suggested and it seems like, 'Wow, how could you keep in touch with what the rest of Washington, D.C. may be thinking and doing when you live up there in Alaska?' Believe me, Alaska is like a microcosm of America.

== Fallout ==
The interviews aired on CBS Evening News showed ratings increases on both nights and clips posted on YouTube garnered more than 10 million views. National Review editor Rich Lowry called Palin's performance in the interview "dreadful." The New York Times television critic Alessandra Stanley described the interview as "in some ways ... the worst" interview Palin had done. The exchange on Russia was "startling," her answer "surprisingly wobbly." While it's "perhaps understandable" that Palin "felt nervous," it still "wasn't a reassuring performance." Beliefnet's Rod Dreher wrote that he was "well and truly embarrassed" for Palin. She's "a good woman who might well be a great governor of Alaska," but this was a "train wreck."

The interviews were later parodied on Saturday Night Live, with Tina Fey as Palin. While helping Seth Meyers write the sketch, Fey decided to use Palin's answer regarding her opinion on the bank bailout nearly verbatim. Fey later said on the Late Show with David Letterman that, in answering that question, Palin "got lost in a corn maze," noticeably struggling to find an answer and meandering between several seemingly unrelated topics such as health care, job creation, lowering government spending, international trade, and lowering taxes, ultimately not stating a clear position for or against it.

CNN commentator Jack Cafferty was particularly critical of Palin's answer to the bailout question, saying that if McCain wins, Palin will be "one 72-year-old's heartbeat away from being President of the United States, and if that doesn't scare the hell out of you, it should" and that in all his years of covering politics, "that was one of the most pathetic pieces of tape I have ever seen from someone aspiring to one of the highest offices in this country." The airing of the Couric interviews coincided with a collapse in her approval ratings and a loss of McCain's gains among white women.

In the immediate aftermath of the interview, Palin voiced irritation she had with Couric's interview:

The Sarah Palin in those interviews was a little bit annoyed. It's like, man, no matter what you say, you are going to get clobbered. If you choose to answer a question, you're going to get clobbered on the answer. If you choose to try to pivot and go on to another subject that you believe that Americans want to hear about, you'll get clobbered for that too. ... In those Katie Couric interviews, I did feel that there were a lot of things that she was missing, in terms of an opportunity to ask what a VP candidate stands for, what the values are represented in our ticket.

Palin also criticized Couric's question on what newspapers and magazines she read:

My response to her, I guess it was kind of filtered. But, I was sort of taken aback, like, the suggestion was, you're way up there in a far away place in Alaska. You know, that there are publications in the rest of the world that are read by many. And I was taken aback by that because I don't know, the suggestion that this was a little bit of perhaps we're not in tune with the rest of the world.

According to campaign manager Rick Davis, Palin thought the questions would be softer than they were: "She was under the impression the Couric thing was going to be easier than it was. Everyone's guard was down for the Couric interview." "I knew it didn't go well the first day, and then we gave her a couple of other segments after that," Palin said in a retrospective with conservative filmmaker John Ziegler on the Couric interview. "My question to the campaign was, after it didn't go well the first day, why were we going to go back for more? Because of however it works in that upper echelon of power brokering, in the media and with spokespersons, it was told [to] me, yeah, we're going to go back for more. And going back for more was not a wise decision, either."

After the election, Couric appeared on the Late Show with David Letterman and discussed her interviews with Palin, especially in regard to her question on what newspapers or magazines she read to "stay informed and to understand the world":

COURIC: I'm not sure whether she was afraid to offend certain people, by, she would offend conservatives by saying she read the New York Times.

LETTERMAN: Or people who don't read. She was afraid of offending people who don't read. Maybe that was it.

COURIC: Even in the post-election interviews, Dave, that she's done, nobody has really asked her, "Why didn't you answer that question?"

Palin directly responded to that question in Ziegler's interview,

Because, Katie, you're not the center of everybody's universe, maybe that's why they didn't think to ask that question among so many other things to be asked. To me the question was more along the lines of: Do you read? What do you guys do up there? What is it that you read? And perhaps I was just too flippant in my answer back to her ...

Ziegler has called the awarding of the Walter Cronkite award to Couric an "outrage." "What really happened here is that Katie Couric showed Governor Palin that she had an agenda on the abortion issue," Ziegler said.

She kept coming back to it time and time again, obviously trying to trap Governor Palin into saying something stupid or extreme. Everything after that has to be seen in the context of that episode, because Governor Palin never trusted Katie Couric after that. It is very, very obvious that Katie Couric had an agenda and that she is being rewarded for having pursued that agenda.

On the other hand, former Republican presidential candidate Mike Huckabee defended Couric, "Now I must say I did not think that ... the Katie Couric interviews were unfair. In fact, if anything, Katie Couric was extraordinarily gentle, even helpful. [Palin] just ... I don't know what happened. I can't explain it. It was not a good interview. I'm being charitable."

Steve Schmidt, McCain's senior campaign strategist and advisor, later reflected on the interview, first by defending Couric by saying that there were no "gotcha questions" or "unfair questions," and then added, "I think it was the most consequential interview from a negative perspective that a candidate for national office has gone through, not since Roger Mudd interviewed Ted Kennedy in the late 1970s." This interview was notable for Kennedy's vague and incoherent response to the question of "[w]hy do you want to be President?" which some say derailed Kennedy's presidential ambitions.

Accepting the Walter Cronkite Award for Special Achievement for National Impact on the 2008 Campaign, Couric said,

I believe one of the reasons that the interview I conducted with Sarah Palin was so impactful is because it wasn't done through any particular ideological prism. I was so mindful of my personal affect, knowing every head tilt, expression, and follow-up question would be carefully dissected for any evidence of bias. My goal was simply to be a conduit to allow her to express her views and give those watching a chance to come to their own conclusions.

== Later remarks ==
In November 2010, Palin ruled out ever granting Couric another interview. Palin said she would not be willing to have an interview "with a reporter who already has such a bias against whatever it is that I would come out and say? Why waste my time? No. ... So a journalist, a reporter who is so biased and will, no doubt, spin and gin up whatever it is that I have to say to create controversy, I swear to you, I will not my waste my time with her. Or him."

In April 2012, Palin temporarily assumed Couric's old job as Today Show co-host for the April 3rd show, competing with Couric's week-long run as host of Good Morning America.

In November 2015, Palin was asked about her response to Couric's question about her news sources. Palin said:

I had a crappy answer. But it was a fair question. I didn't like, though, the way that, forever then in these seven years, that interview has kind of been stamped on my forehead as, 'she's an idiot.' I just think, in the context of the whole ball of wax that day—or two days—of an interview and editing, it wasn't real fun.
