= Sweet Freedom: A Devotional =

2015 book by Sarah Palin

- Author: Sarah Palin
- Language: English
- Subject: Religion, politics
- Genre: Devotional
- Publisher: Regnery Publishing
- Publication date: November 16, 2015
- Publication place: United States
- Media type: Hardcover (large print and audiobook available)
- Pages: 288
- ISBN: 978-1-62157-463-7
- OCLC: 2777708191
- Preceded by: Good Tidings and Great Joy: Protecting the Heart of Christmas

Sweet Freedom: A Devotional is a 2015 book by Sarah Palin. It consists of 260 devotionals, all based on biblical verses, discussing the author's takes on current political topics. The book was generally well received, including endorsement of public figures such as Donald Trump and Mark Levin. According to the book's publisher Regnery Publishing, the book peaked at number one on the Amazon chart for devotionals. During the month after the release of the book, Palin attended book signings in North Carolina, Florida and California.
