= Betsy Reed =

American journalist and editor (born 1968)

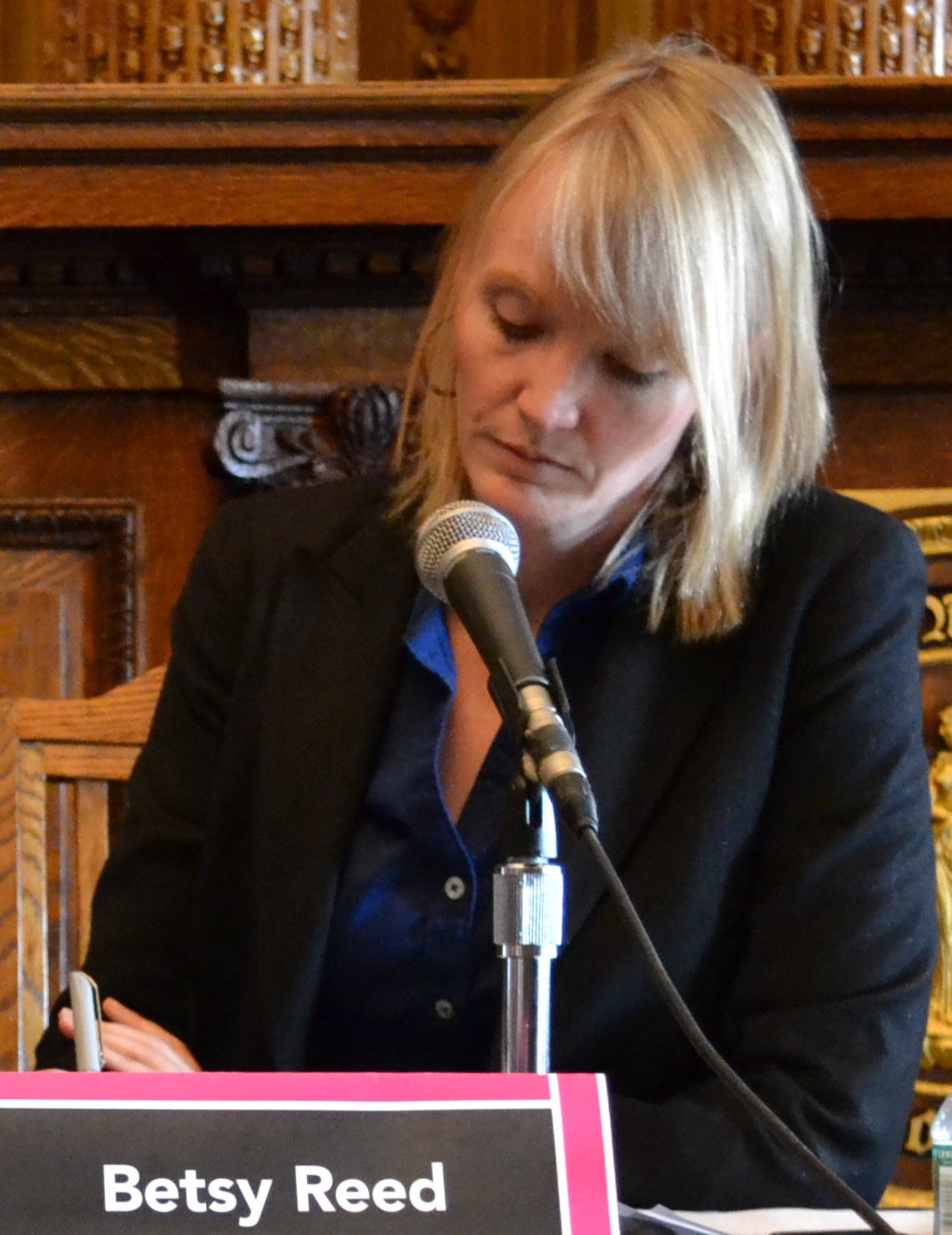
- Reed at the 2011 Brooklyn Book Festival
- Born: 1968 (age 57–58)
- Education: Harvard University (BA)

Betsy Reed (born 1968) is an American journalist and editor. From January 2015, she was the editor-in-chief of The Intercept. In July 2022, she was named the editor-in-chief of Guardian US, succeeding John Mulholland, and assumed her new position in the autumn of that year.

Reed earned a bachelor's degree in history and literature from Harvard University in 1990. She worked for sixteen years as editor at the weekly magazine The Nation, starting as senior editor in 1998, and promoted to executive editor in 2006. She left The Nation in late 2014 in order to join The Intercept as its editor-in-chief.

Upon her succession of John Mulholland, Katherine Viner, editor-in-chief of Guardian News & Media described Reed as "one of America's foremost and experienced editors".

She has also edited several books of investigative journalism, including Blackwater and Dirty Wars by Jeremy Scahill, and the essay collection Going Rouge: Sarah Palin, An American Nightmare.

== The Intercept ==
In October 2020, Reed became embroiled in a public dispute with Glenn Greenwald, co-founding editor of The Intercept. Greenwald resigned in protest, saying that the publication refused to publish an article he wrote on Democratic U.S. presidential candidate Joe Biden unless he removed sections critical of Biden. Reed disputed Greenwald's charge, and said she had asked Greenwald to substantiate his statements as part of the normal editing process but that Greenwald had refused. The following week, Laura Poitras, who, like Greenwald, co-founded The Intercept, said she had been fired in 2020 "without cause" from First Look Media, the parent company of The Intercept, for criticizing The Intercept's handling of whistleblower Reality Winner.

In an open letter dated January 14, 2021, Poitras singled out Reed and First Look Media's CEO Michael Bloom for her firing. First Look responded that it had not renewed Poitras's employment contract because she had not been very active with the company in recent years, and Reed called Poitras' claims "baseless and frankly ridiculous". Nevertheless, Betsy Reed oversaw the initial reporting on Winner’s NSA leak, and when their lone source's identity was compromised Intercept management ordered an internal review of the newsroom's handling of Winner's restricted documents (regarding Russian interference in the 2016 United States elections).

Reed did not fade into the background while the internal inspection was underway, she instead took an active behind-the-scenes role in The Intercept's investigation, assigned staff who reported directly to her to gather facts, and, when the facts pointed to editorial failures, Reed removed the staff person from the investigation, according to Laura Poitras.
