= DW Gibson =

American journalist

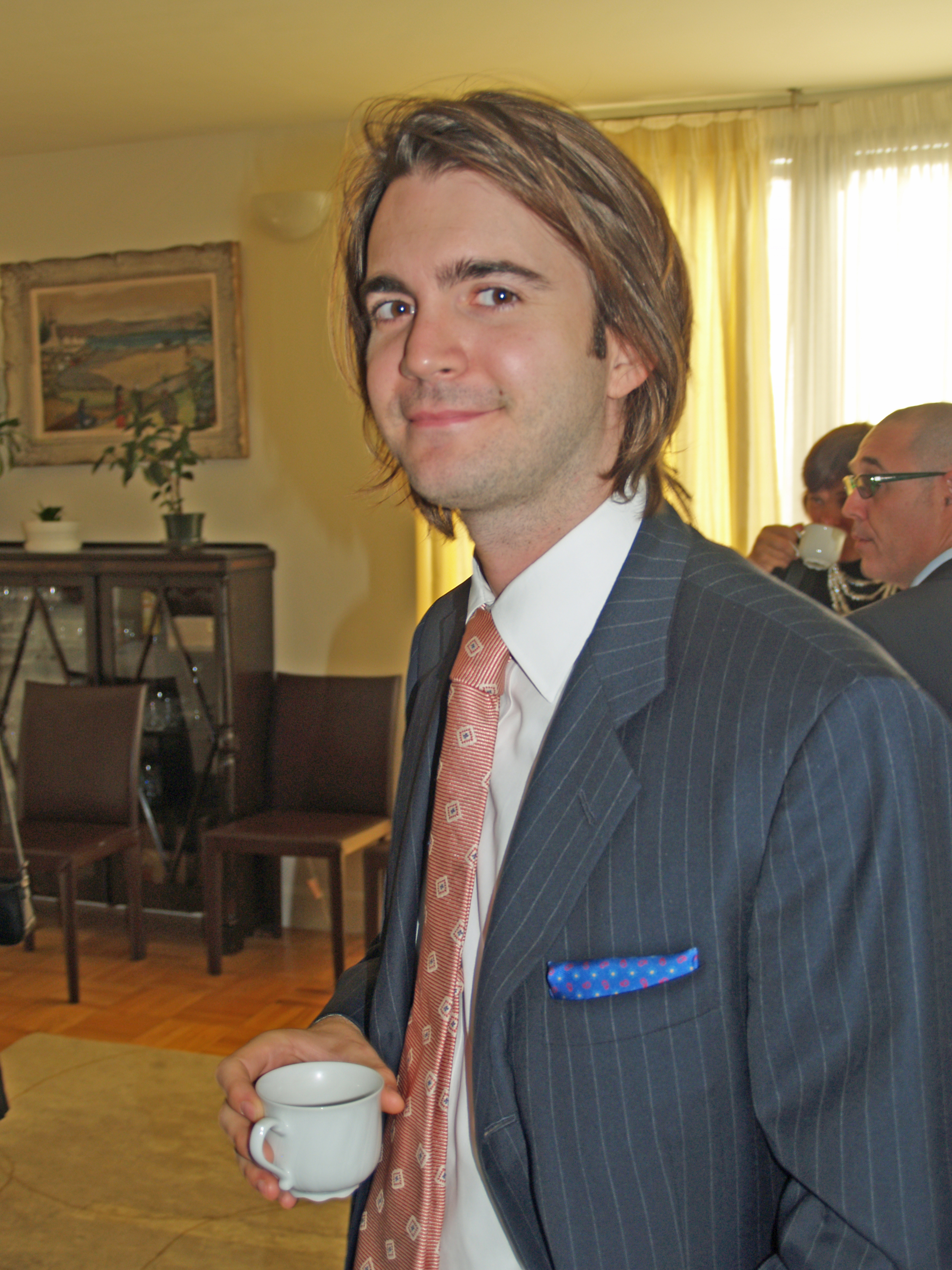
- Occupations: Journalist; Author; Radio Host

David-William Gibson is an American journalist, author, radio host, and cultural critic. He shared a 2016 National Magazine Award for his work on “This Is the Story of One Block in Bed-Stuy, Brooklyn” for New York magazine.

Gibson has published two oral histories: Not Working: People Talk About Losing a Job and Finding Their Way in Today’s Changing Economy and The Edge Becomes the Center: An Oral History of Gentrification in the 21st Century, which won the inaugural Brooklyn Eagle Literary Prize awarded by the Brooklyn Public Library and a 2016 Independent Publisher Book Awards Gold Medal. He has written for Harper’s, The New York Times, The Washington Post, The Nation, and The Village Voice. He has contributed on-air to NPR’s All Things Considered and Midday on WNYC
