= Sarah Palin =

American politician (born 1964)

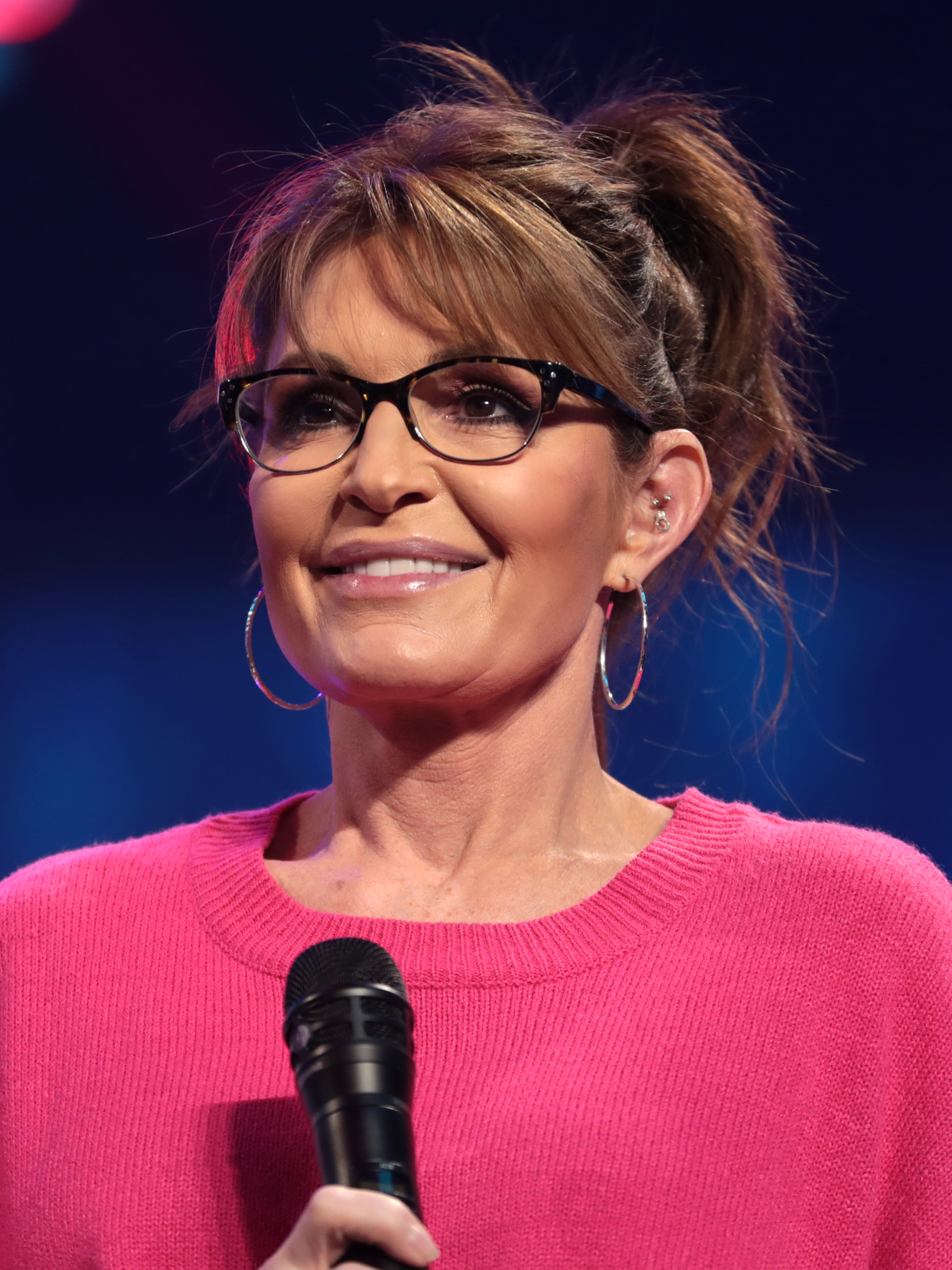
- Palin in 2021

9th Governor of Alaska
- In office December 4, 2006 – July 26, 2009
- Lieutenant: Sean Parnell
- Preceded by: Frank Murkowski
- Succeeded by: Sean Parnell

Chair of the Alaska Oil and Gas Conservation Commission
- In office February 19, 2003 – January 23, 2004
- Governor: Frank Murkowski
- Deputy: Mike Bill; Randy Ruedrich; Daniel Seamount
- Preceded by: Camille Taylor
- Succeeded by: John Norman

Mayor of Wasilla
- In office October 14, 1996 – October 14, 2002
- Preceded by: John Stein
- Succeeded by: Dianne Keller

Member of the Wasilla City Council from Ward E
- In office October 19, 1992 – October 14, 1996
- Preceded by: Dorothy Smith
- Succeeded by: Colleen Cottle

Personal details
- Born: Sarah Louise Heath; February 11, 1964 (age 62) Sandpoint, Idaho, U.S.
- Party: Republican
- Spouse: Todd Palin (m. 1988; div. 2020)
- Children: 5, including Bristol
- Education: University of Hawaii, Hilo (attended); Hawaii Pacific University (attended); North Idaho College (attended); Matanuska-Susitna College (attended); University of Idaho (BA)
- Website: Official website

Sarah Louise Palin (/ˈpeɪlɪn/ PAY-lin; née Heath; born February 11, 1964) is an American politician, commentator, and author who served as the ninth governor of Alaska from 2006 until her resignation in 2009. She was the 2008 Republican vice presidential nominee on the ticket of U.S. senator John McCain.

Palin was elected to the Wasilla city council in 1992 and became mayor of Wasilla in 1996. In 2003, after an unsuccessful run for lieutenant governor, she was appointed chair of the Alaska Oil and Gas Conservation Commission, responsible for overseeing the state's oil and gas fields for safety and efficiency. In 2006, at age 42, she became the youngest person (at the time) and the first woman to be elected governor of Alaska. Immense legal fees incurred by both Palin and the state of Alaska from her fights against ethics investigations led to her resignation in 2009.

Palin was nominated as John McCain's vice presidential running mate at the 2008 Republican National Convention. She was the first Republican female vice presidential nominee and the second female vice presidential nominee of a major party, after Geraldine Ferraro in 1984. The McCain-Palin ticket subsequently lost the 2008 election to the Democratic Party's then-U.S. senators Barack Obama and Joe Biden. Throughout the race, her public image and experience came under media attention. Although her vice presidential bid alongside McCain was unsuccessful, the 2008 presidential election significantly raised Palin's national profile.

Since her resignation as governor in 2009, she has campaigned for the fiscally conservative Tea Party movement. In addition, she has publicly endorsed several candidates in multiple election cycles, including Donald Trump in his 2016 presidential campaign. She has also led a career as a television personality. From 2010 to 2015, she provided political commentary for Fox News. She hosted TLC's Sarah Palin's Alaska in 2010–11 and Amazing America with Sarah Palin on the Sportsman Channel in 2014–15. From 2014 to 2015, she oversaw a short-lived subscriber-based online TV channel, the Sarah Palin Channel, via TAPP TV. Her personal memoir, Going Rogue, written following the 2008 election, sold more than one million copies.

In 2022, Palin ran in the special election for Alaska's at-large congressional seat that was vacated after the death of Representative Don Young, but lost to Democrat Mary Peltola, who completed Young's unfinished term. Palin faced Peltola and others again in the November general election for the same seat, and again lost to Peltola, who won re-election to serve a full two-year term.

== Early life and education ==
Palin was born in Sandpoint, Idaho, the third of four children (three daughters and one son) of Sarah "Sally" Heath (née Sheeran; 1940–2021), a school secretary, and Charles R. "Chuck" Heath (born 1938), a science teacher and track-and-field coach. Palin's siblings are Chuck Jr., Heather, and Molly. Palin is of English, Irish, and German ancestry.

When Palin was a few months old, the family moved to Skagway, Alaska, where her father had been hired to teach. They relocated to Eagle River, Anchorage in 1969, and settled in Wasilla, Alaska, in 1972.

Palin played flute in the junior high band. She attended Wasilla High School, where she was head of the Fellowship of Christian Athletes and a member of the girls' basketball and cross-country running teams. During her senior year, she was co-captain and point guard of the basketball team that won the 1982 Alaska state championship, earning the nickname "Sarah Barracuda" for her competitive streak.

In 1984, Palin won the Miss Wasilla beauty pageant; she finished third (as second runner-up) in the Miss Alaska pageant, where she won the title of "Miss Congeniality". She played the flute in the talent portion of the contest. Though one author reported that she received the Miss Congeniality award in the Miss Wasilla contest, this was disputed by another contestant and classmate of Palin's. She received a college scholarship.

After graduating from high school in 1982, Palin enrolled at the University of Hawaii at Hilo. Shortly after arriving in Hawaii, Palin transferred to Hawaii Pacific University in Honolulu for a semester in the fall of 1982. She returned to the mainland, enrolling at North Idaho College, a community college in Coeur d'Alene, for the spring and fall semesters of 1983. She transferred and enrolled at the University of Idaho in Moscow, Idaho, for an academic year starting in August 1984. Beginning in the fall of 1985, she attended Matanuska-Susitna College in Alaska. Palin returned to the University of Idaho in January 1986 and received her bachelor's degree in communications with an emphasis in journalism in May 1987.

== Early career ==
After graduation, Palin worked as a sportscaster for KTUU-TV and KTVA-TV in Anchorage and as a sports reporter for the Mat-Su Valley Frontiersman, fulfilling an early ambition.

== Political career ==
Palin has been a Republican since 1982.

=== Wasilla City Council ===
Palin was elected to the Wasilla City Council in 1992, winning by a margin of 530 votes to 310.

=== Mayor of Wasilla ===
Concerned that revenue from a new Wasilla sales tax would not be spent wisely, Palin ran for mayor of Wasilla in 1996, defeating incumbent mayor John Stein by a 651–440 margin. Her biographer described her campaign as targeting wasteful spending and high taxes; her opponent, Stein, said that Palin introduced abortion, gun rights, and term limits as campaign issues. The election was nonpartisan, though the state Republican Party ran advertisements for Palin. She ran for reelection against Stein in 1999 and won, 909 votes to 292. In 2002, she completed the second of the two consecutive three-year terms allowed by the city charter. She was elected president of the Alaska Conference of Mayors in 1999.

==== First term ====
Using revenue generated by a 2% sales tax, which had been approved by Wasilla voters in October 1992, Palin cut property taxes by 75% and eliminated personal property and business inventory taxes. Using municipal bonds, she made improvements to the roads and sewers and increased funding to the police department. She oversaw creation of new bike paths and procured funding for storm-water treatment to protect freshwater resources. At the same time, she reduced the budget of the local museum and postponed discussions about a new library and city hall, which some of the council believed was needed.

Soon after taking office in October 1996, Palin eliminated the position of museum director. She asked for updated resumes and resignation letters from "city department heads who had been loyal to Stein", although the mayor's office was considered a non-partisan position. These included the city police chief, public works director, finance director, and librarian. Palin stated this request was to find out their intentions and whether they supported her. She temporarily required department heads to get her approval before talking to reporters, saying they needed to learn her administration's policies. She created the position of city administrator and reduced her own $68,000 salary by 10%. By mid 1998 this action was reversed by the city council.

In October 1996, Palin asked library director Mary Ellen Emmons if she would object to the removal of a book from the library if people were picketing to have the book removed. Emmons responded that she would, and others as well. Palin stated that she had not been proposing censorship but had been discussing many issues with her staff that were "both rhetorical and realistic in nature." No attempt was made to remove books from the library during Palin's tenure as mayor.

Palin said she fired Police Chief Irl Stambaugh because he did not fully support her efforts to govern the city. Stambaugh filed a lawsuit alleging wrongful termination and violation of his free speech rights. The judge dismissed Stambaugh's lawsuit, holding that the police chief served at the discretion of the mayor and could be terminated for nearly any reason, even a political one, and ordered Stambaugh to pay Palin's legal fees.

==== Second term ====
During her second term as mayor, Palin proposed and promoted the construction of a municipal sports center to be financed by a 0.5% sales tax increase and a $14.7 million bond issue. Voters approved the measure by a 20-vote margin, and the Wasilla Multi-Use Sports Complex (later named the Curtis D. Menard Memorial Sports Center) was built on time and under budget. However, the city spent an additional $1.3 million because of an eminent domain lawsuit caused by the city's failure to obtain clear title to the property before beginning construction. The city's long-term debt grew from about $1 million to $25 million because of expenditures of $15 million for the sports complex, $5.5 million for street projects, and $3 million for water improvement projects. The Wall Street Journal characterized the project as a "financial mess." A city council member defended the spending increases as being necessitated by the city's growth during that time.

Palin also joined with nearby communities in hiring the Anchorage-based lobbying firm of Robertson, Monagle & Eastaugh to lobby for federal funds. The firm secured nearly $8 million in earmarks for the Wasilla city government, including $500,000 for a youth shelter, $1.9 million for a transportation hub, and $900,000 for sewer repairs. In 2008, Wasilla's incumbent mayor credited Palin's 75 percent property tax cuts and infrastructure improvements with bringing "big-box stores" and 50,000 shoppers per day to Wasilla.

Term limits prevented Palin from seeking a third term in 2002. Palin endorsed Dianne Keller in the election to succeed her. Keller won, defeating three opponents, including Faye Palin (Palin's mother-in-law, the stepmother of Palin's husband).

=== State politics ===
In 2002, Palin ran for the Republican nomination for lieutenant governor, coming in second to Loren Leman in a five-way Republican primary. Following her defeat, she campaigned throughout the state for the nominated Republican governor-lieutenant governor ticket of Frank Murkowski and Leman. Murkowski and Leman won and Murkowski resigned from his long-held U.S. Senate seat in December 2002 to assume the governorship. Palin was said to be on the "short list" of possible appointees to Murkowski's U.S. Senate seat, but Murkowski ultimately appointed his daughter, state representative Lisa Murkowski, as his successor in the Senate.

Governor Murkowski offered other jobs to Palin and, in February 2003, she accepted an appointment to the Alaska Oil and Gas Conservation Commission, which oversees Alaska's oil and gas fields for safety and efficiency. While she had little background in the area, she said she wanted to learn more about the oil industry and was named chair of the commission and ethics supervisor. By November 2003, she was filing nonpublic ethics complaints with the state attorney general and the governor against a fellow commission member, Randy Ruedrich, a former petroleum engineer and at the time the chair of the state Republican Party. He was forced to resign in November 2003. Palin resigned in January 2004 and put her protests against Ruedrich's "lack of ethics" into the public arena by filing a public complaint against Ruedrich, who was then fined $12,000. She joined with Democratic legislator Eric Croft in complaining that Gregg Renkes, then the attorney general of Alaska, had a financial conflict of interest in negotiating a coal exporting trade agreement. Renkes also resigned his post.

From 2003 to June 2005, Palin served as one of three directors of "Ted Stevens Excellence in Public Service, Inc.," a 527 group designed to provide political training for Republican women in Alaska. In 2004, Palin told the Anchorage Daily News that she had decided not to run for the U.S. Senate that year against the Republican incumbent, Lisa Murkowski, because her teenage son opposed it. Palin said, "How could I be the team mom if I was a U.S. Senator?"

== Governor of Alaska ==
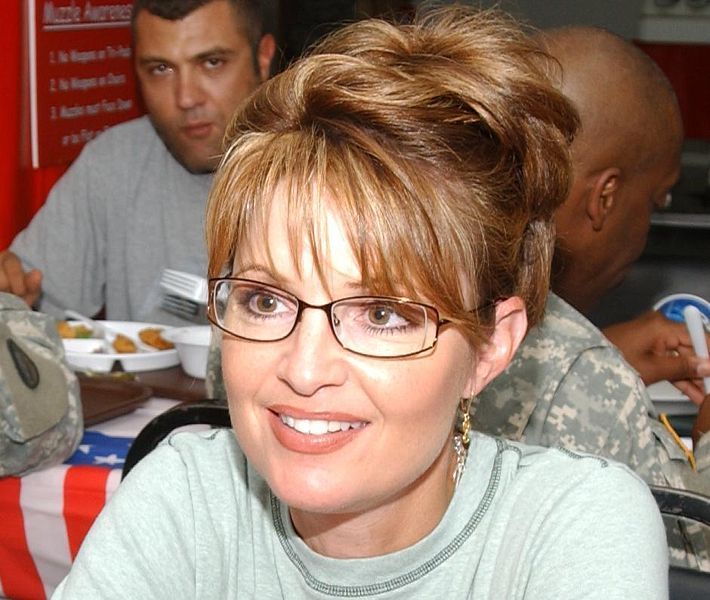
Palin visits soldiers of the Alaska National Guard, July 24, 2007.

In 2006, running on a clean-government platform, Palin defeated incumbent governor Frank Murkowski in the Republican gubernatorial primary. Her running mate was State Senator Sean Parnell.

In the November election, Palin was outspent but victorious, defeating former Democratic governor Tony Knowles 48.3% to 41.0%. She became Alaska's first female governor and, at the age of 42, the youngest governor in Alaskan history. She was the state's first governor to have been born after Alaska achieved U.S. statehood, and the first who was not inaugurated in the capital, Juneau (she chose to have the ceremony in Fairbanks instead).

She took office on December 4, 2006. For most of her term, she was very popular with Alaska voters. Polls taken in 2007 showed her with 93% and 89% popularity among all voters. The Anchorage Daily News and The Weekly Standard called her "the most popular governor in America." A poll taken in late September 2008, after Palin was named to the national Republican ticket, showed her popularity in Alaska at 68%. A poll taken in May 2009 indicated Palin's popularity among Alaskans had declined to 54% positive and 41.6% negative.

Palin declared that top priorities of her administration would be resource development, education and workforce development, public health and safety, and transportation and infrastructure development. She had championed ethics reform throughout her election campaign. Her first legislative action after taking office was to push for a bipartisan ethics reform bill. She signed the resulting legislation in July 2007, calling it a "first step" and declaring that she remained determined to clean up Alaska politics.

Palin frequently broke with the Alaskan Republican establishment. For example, she endorsed Parnell's bid to unseat Don Young, the state's longtime at-large U.S. representative. She publicly challenged then-U.S. Senator Ted Stevens to "come clean" about the federal investigation into his financial dealings. She promoted the development of oil and natural-gas resources in Alaska, including drilling in the Arctic National Wildlife Refuge (ANWR). Proposals to drill for oil in ANWR have catalyzed national debate.

In 2006, Palin obtained a passport. In 2007, she traveled to Kuwait, where she visited the Khabari Alawazem Crossing at the Kuwait–Iraq border and met with members of the Alaska National Guard. On her return journey, she visited injured soldiers in Germany.

=== Budget, spending, and federal funds ===
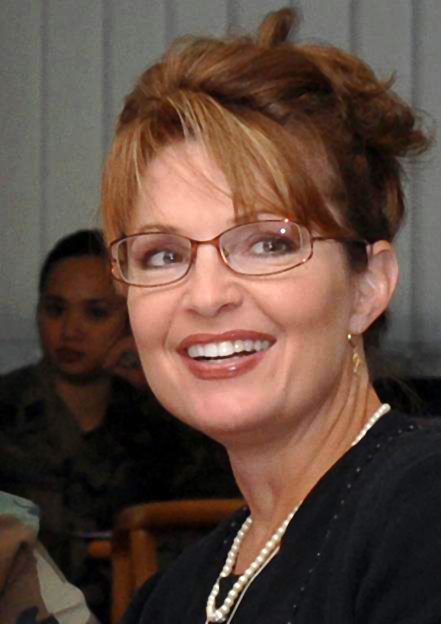
Palin in Germany, July 2007

In June 2007, Palin signed a record $6.6 billion operating budget into law. At the same time, she used her veto power to make the second-largest cuts of the capital budget in state history. The $237 million in cuts represented over 300 local projects and reduced the capital budget to $1.6 billion.

In 2008, Palin vetoed $286 million, cutting or reducing funding for 350 projects from the FY09 capital budget.

Palin followed through on a campaign promise to sell the Westwind II jet, a purchase made by the Murkowski administration for $2.7 million in 2005 against the wishes of the legislature. In August 2007, the jet was listed on eBay, but the sale fell through, and the plane later sold for $2.1 million through a private brokerage firm.

==== Gubernatorial expenditures ====
Palin lived in Juneau during the legislative session, and lived in Wasilla and worked out of offices in Anchorage the rest of the year. Since the office in Anchorage was 565 miles from Juneau, while she worked there, state officials said she was permitted to claim a $58 per diem travel allowance and reimbursement for hotel. She filed for per diem, claiming a total of $16,951, but rather than stay at a hotel overnight, regularly commuted the 50 miles one way to her home in Wasilla. She did not use the former governor's private chef.

Both Republicans and Democrats criticized Palin for taking the per diem, as well as an additional $43,490 in travel expenses on occasions when her family accompanied her on state business. Palin's staffers responded that these practices were in line with state policy, that her gubernatorial expenses were 80% below those of her predecessor Murkowski, and that "many of the hundreds of invitations Palin receives include requests for her to bring her family, placing the definition of 'state business' with the party extending the invitation."

In February 2009, the State of Alaska, reversing a policy that had treated the payments as legitimate business expenses under the Internal Revenue Code, decided that per diems paid to state employees for stays in their own homes would be treated as taxable income and will be included in employees' gross income on their W-2 forms. Palin had ordered the review of the tax policy.

In December 2008, an Alaska state commission recommended increasing the governor's annual salary from $125,000 to $150,000. Palin said that she would not accept the pay raise. In response, the commission dropped the recommendation.

==== Federal funding ====
In her State of the State address on January 17, 2008, Palin declared that the people of Alaska "can and must continue to develop our economy, because we cannot and must not rely so heavily on federal government [funding]." Alaska's federal congressional representatives cut back on pork-barrel project requests during Palin's time as governor.

While the state has no sales tax or income tax, royalty revenues from the Prudhoe Bay Oil Field (consisting mostly of state-owned lands) have supported large state budgets since 1980. The exact amounts have depended on the prevailing price of petroleum. As a result, state revenues doubled to $10 billion in 2008. Despite this, for the 2009 state budget, Palin gave a list of 31 proposed federal earmarks or requests for funding, totaling $197 million, to Alaska's senior U.S. senator Ted Stevens. This was a major decrease from earlier years. Palin has said that her decreasing support for federal funding was a source of friction between her and the state's congressional delegation; Palin requested less in federal funding each year than her predecessor Frank Murkowski requested in his last year.

==== Bridge to Nowhere ====
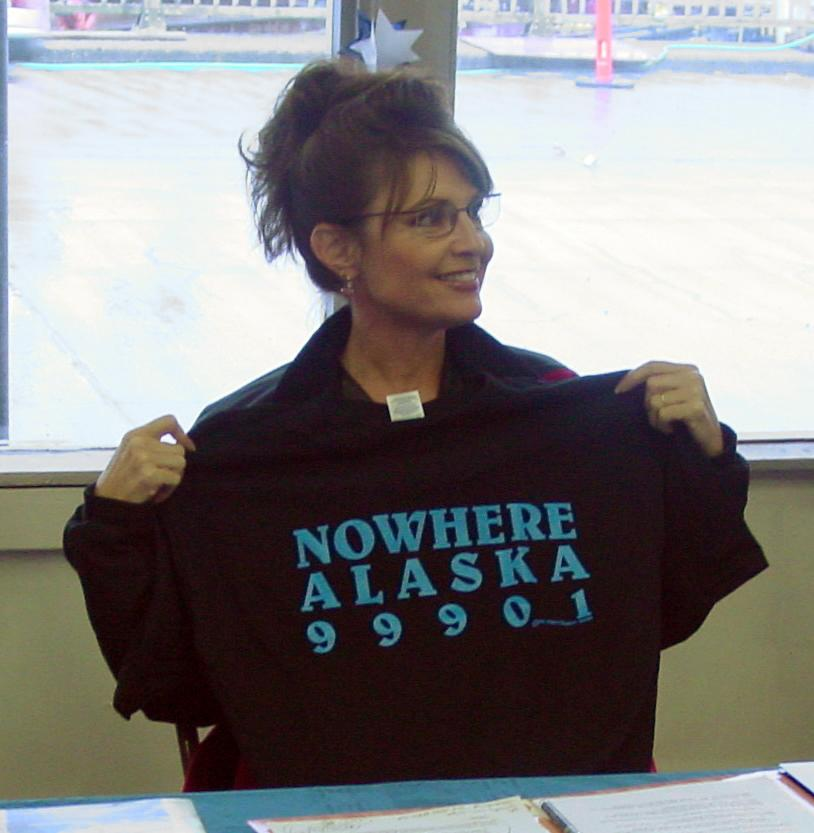
Palin visiting Ketchikan during her gubernatorial campaign, 2006

In 2002, it was proposed that a for-profit prison corporation, Cornell Corrections, build a prison on Gravina Island. To connect Gravina with nearby Ketchikan, on Revillagigedo Island, it was originally planned that the federal government spend $175 million on building a bridge and another $75 million to connect it to the power grid with an electrical intertie. The Ketchikan Borough Assembly turned the proposal down when the administration of Governor Tony Knowles also expressed its disfavor with the idea. Eventually, the corporation's prison plans led to the exposure of the wide-ranging Alaska political corruption probe, which eventually ensnared Alaska's U.S. senator Ted Stevens. The bridge idea persisted through the administration of former U.S. senator and then-governor Frank Murkowski. The 2005 Highway Bill provided for $223m to build the Gravina Island Bridge. The provisions and earmarks were negotiated by Alaska's Rep. Don Young, who chaired the House Transportation Committee, and were supported by the chair of the Senate Appropriations Committee, Ted Stevens. This bridge, nicknamed "The Bridge to Nowhere" by critics, was intended to replace the auto ferry that is currently the only connection between Ketchikan and its airport. While the federal earmark was withdrawn after meeting opposition from Oklahoma senator Tom Coburn, the state of Alaska still received $300 million in transportation funding, with which the state of Alaska continued to study improvements in access to the airport, which conceivably could include improvements to the ferry service. In 2006, Palin had run for governor with a "build-the-bridge" plank in her platform, saying she would "not allow the spinmeisters to turn this project ... into something that's so negative." Palin criticized the use of the word "nowhere" as insulting to local residents and urged speedy work on building the infrastructure "while our congressional delegation is in a strong position to assist." Despite the demise of the bridge proposal, Palin spent $26 million in transportation funding for the planned 3-mile access road on Gravina island that ultimately had little use. A spokesman for Alaska's Department of Transportation said that it had been within Palin's power to cancel the road project but noted the state was considering cheaper designs to complete the bridge project, and that in any case the road would open up the surrounding lands for development. As governor, Palin canceled the Gravina Island Bridge in September 2007, saying that Congress had "little interest in spending any more money" due to "inaccurate portrayals of the projects." Alaska did not return the $442 million in federal transportation funds.

In 2008, as a candidate for vice president, Palin characterized her position as having told Congress "thanks, but no thanks, on that bridge to nowhere." A number of Ketchikan residents said that the claim was false and a betrayal of Palin's previous support for their community. Some critics said that her statement was misleading, as she had expressed support for the spending project and kept the federal money after the project was canceled.

=== Gas pipeline ===
In August 2008, Palin signed a bill authorizing the State of Alaska to award TransCanada Pipelines—the sole bidder to meet the state's requirements—a license to build and operate a pipeline to transport natural gas from the Alaska North Slope to the continental United States through Canada. The governor also pledged $500 million in seed money to support the project.

It was estimated that the project would cost $26 billion. Newsweek described the project as "the principal achievement of Sarah Palin's term as Alaska's governor." The pipeline also faces legal challenges from Canadian First Nations.

=== Predator control ===
In 2007, Palin supported a 2003 Alaska Department of Fish and Game policy allowing the hunting of wolves from the air as part of a predator control program intended to increase moose and caribou populations for subsistence-food gatherers and other hunters. In March 2007, the department offered a bounty of $150 per wolf would be paid to the 180 volunteer pilots and gunners in five areas of Alaska to offset fuel costs. In the preceding four years, 607 wolves had been killed. State biologists wanted 382 to 664 wolves to be killed by the end of the predator-control season in April 2007. Wildlife activists sued the state- A state judge declared the bounty illegal on the basis that a bounty would have to be offered by the Board of Game and not by the Department of Fish and Game. On August 26, 2008, Alaskans voted against ending the state's predator control program.

=== Public Safety Commissioner dismissal ===
Palin dismissed Public Safety Commissioner Walt Monegan on July 11, 2008, citing performance-related issues, such as not being "a team player on budgeting issues" and "egregious rogue behavior." Palin attorney Thomas Van Flein said that the "last straw" was Monegan's planned trip to Washington, D.C., to seek funding for a new, multimillion-dollar sexual assault initiative the governor hadn't yet approved.

Monegan said that he had resisted persistent pressure from Palin, her husband, and her staff, including state attorney general Talis J. Colberg, to fire Palin's ex-brother-in-law, Alaska state trooper Mike Wooten; Wooten was involved in a child custody battle with Palin's sister after a bitter divorce that included an alleged death threat against Palin's father. At one point Sarah and Todd Palin hired a private investigator to gather information, seeking to have Wooten officially disciplined. Monegan stated that he learned an internal investigation had found all but two of the allegations to be unsubstantiated, and Wooten had been disciplined for the others – an illegal moose killing and the tasering of his 11-year-old stepson, who had reportedly asked to be tasered. He told the Palins that there was nothing he could do because the matter was closed. When contacted by the press for comment, Monegan first acknowledged pressure to fire Wooten but said that he could not be certain that his own firing was connected to that issue; he later asserted that the dispute over Wooten was a major reason for his firing. Palin stated on July 17 that Monegan was not pressured to fire Wooten, nor dismissed for not doing so.

Monegan said the subject of Wooten came up when he invited Palin to a birthday party for his cousin, state senator Lyman Hoffman, in February 2007 during the legislative session in Juneau. "As we were walking down the stairs in the capitol building she wanted to talk to me about her former brother-in-law," Monegan said. "I said, 'Ma'am, I need to keep you at arm's length with this. I can't deal about him with you. She said, 'OK, that's a good idea.'"

Palin said there was "absolutely no pressure ever put on Commissioner Monegan to hire or fire anybody, at any time. I did not abuse my office powers. And I don't know how to be more blunt and candid and honest, but to tell you that truth. To tell you that no pressure was ever put on anybody to fire anybody." Todd Palin gave a similar account.

On August 13, she acknowledged that a half dozen members of her administration had made more than two dozen calls on the matter to various state officials. "I do now have to tell Alaskans that such pressure could have been perceived to exist, although I have only now become aware of it", she said. Palin said, "Many of these inquiries were completely appropriate. However, the serial nature of the contacts could be perceived as some kind of pressure, presumably at my direction."

Chuck Kopp, whom Palin had appointed to replace Monegan as public safety commissioner, received a $10,000 state severance package after he resigned following just two weeks on the job. Kopp, the former Kenai chief of police, resigned July 25 following disclosure of a 2005 sexual harassment complaint and letter of reprimand against him. Monegan said that he did not receive a severance package from the state.

==== Legislative investigation ====
On August 1, 2008, the Alaska Legislature hired an investigator, Stephen Branchflower, to review the Monegan dismissal. Legislators stated that Palin had the legal authority to fire Monegan, but they wanted to know whether her action had been motivated by anger at Monegan for not firing Wooten. The atmosphere was bipartisan and Palin pledged to cooperate. Wooten remained employed as a state trooper. She placed an aide on paid leave due to a tape-recorded phone conversation that she deemed improper, in which the aide, appearing to act on her behalf, complained to a trooper that Wooten had not been fired.

Several weeks after the start of what the media referred to as "troopergate", Palin was chosen as John McCain's running mate. On September 1, Palin asked the legislature to drop its investigation, saying that the state Personnel Board had jurisdiction over ethics issues. The Personnel Board's three members were first appointed by Palin's predecessor, and Palin reappointed one member in 2008. On September 19, Todd Palin and several state employees refused to honor subpoenas, the validity of which were disputed by Talis Colberg, Palin's appointee as Alaska's attorney general. On October 2, a court rejected Colberg's challenge to the subpoenas, and seven of the witnesses, not including Todd Palin, eventually testified.

==== Branchflower Report ====
On October 10, 2008, the Alaska Legislative Council unanimously voted to release, without endorsing, the Branchflower Report, in which investigator Stephen Branchflower found that firing Monegan "was a proper and lawful exercise of her constitutional and statutory authority," but that Palin abused her power as governor and violated the state's Executive Branch Ethics Act when her office pressured Monegan to fire Wooten. The report stated that "Governor Palin knowingly permitted a situation to continue where impermissible pressure was placed on several subordinates to advance a personal agenda, to wit: to get Trooper Michael Wooten fired." The report also said that Palin "permitted Todd Palin to use the Governor's office [...] to continue to contact subordinate state employees in an effort to find some way to get Trooper Wooten fired."

Palin's attorneys condemned the Branchflower Report as "misleading and wrong on the law" and an attempt to "smear the governor by innuendo." The day after the report was released, Palin said she was "very, very pleased to be cleared of any legal wrongdoing" or "any kind of unethical activity."

==== Alaska Personnel Board investigation and report ====
The bipartisan State of Alaska Personnel Board reviewed the matter at Palin's request. On September 15, the Anchorage law firm of Clapp, Peterson, Van Flein, Tiemessen & Thorsness filed arguments of "no probable cause" with the Personnel Board on behalf of Palin. The Personnel Board retained independent counsel Timothy Petumenos as an investigator. On October 24, Palin gave three hours of depositions with the Personnel Board in St. Louis, Missouri. On November 3, 2008, the State of Alaska Personnel Board reported that there was no probable cause to believe that Palin or any other state official had violated state ethical standards. The report further stated that the Branchflower Report used the wrong statute in reaching its conclusions, misconstrued the available evidence and did not consider or obtain all of the material evidence required to properly reach findings in the matter.

=== Job approval ratings ===
As governor of Alaska, Palin's job approval rating ranged from a high of 93% in May 2007 to a low of 54% in May 2009.

| Date | Approval | Disapproval | Pollster |
|---|---|---|---|
| May 15, 2007 | 93% | Not reported | Dittman Research |
| May 30, 2007 | 89% | Not reported | Ivan Moore Research |
| October 19–21, 2007 | 83% | 11% | Ivan Moore Research |
| April 10, 2008 | 73% | 7% | Rasmussen Reports |
| May 17, 2008 | 69% | 9% | Rasmussen Reports |
| July 24–25, 2008 | 80% | Not reported | Hays Research Group |
| July 30, 2008 | 64% | 14% | Rasmussen Reports |
| September 20–22, 2008 | 68% | Not reported | Ivan Moore Research |
| October 7, 2008 | 63% | 37% | Rasmussen Reports |
| March 24–25, 2009 | 59.8% | 34.9% | Hays Research |
| May 4–5, 2009 | 54% | 41.6% | Hays Research |
| June 14–18, 2009 | 56% | 35% | Global Strategy Group |

=== Resignation ===
On July 3, 2009, Palin announced that she would not run for reelection in the 2010 Alaska gubernatorial election and would resign before the end of the month. Palin stated that since August 2008, both she and the state had been spending an "insane" amount of time and money ($2.5 million) responding to "opposition research", 150 FOIA requests and 15 "frivolous" legal ethics complaints filed by "political operatives" against her. She said her resignation was also influenced by her desire not to be a lame duck.

Lieutenant Governor Sean Parnell said that Palin's decision to resign was driven by the high cost of legal fees against ethics investigations; Palin and her husband Todd personally incurred more than $500,000 in legal expenses. Parnell became governor on July 26, 2009, in an inaugural ceremony in Fairbanks upon Palin's resignation taking effect.

In December 2010, new rules governing Alaska executive branch ethics, stemming from Palin's tenure as governor, took effect. "These include allowing for the state to pay legal costs for officials cleared of ethics violations; (and) allowing for a family member of the governor or lieutenant governor to travel at state cost in certain circumstances ..."

== 2008 vice presidential campaign ==
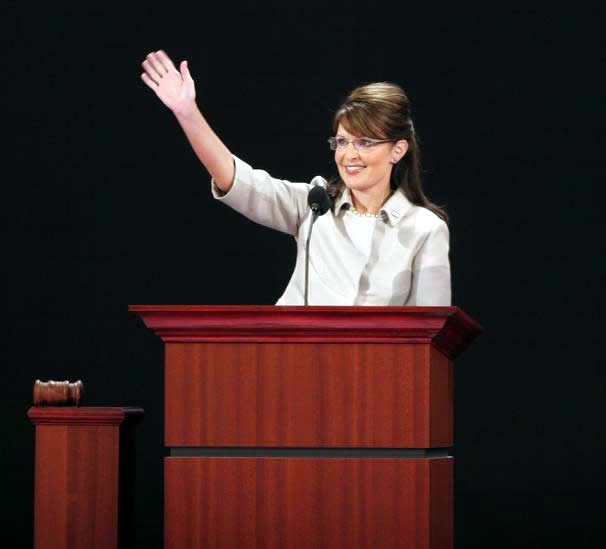
Palin addresses the 2008 Republican National Convention in Saint Paul, Minnesota.

Several conservative commentators met Palin in the summer of 2007. Some of them, such as Bill Kristol, later urged McCain to pick Palin as his vice presidential running mate, arguing that her presence on the ticket would provide a boost in enthusiasm among the Religious Right wing of the Republican party, while her status as an unknown on the national scene would also be a positive factor.

On August 24, 2008, Steve Schmidt and a few other senior McCain campaign advisers discussed potential vice presidential picks with the consensus settling around Palin. The following day, the strategists advised McCain of their conclusions and McCain personally called Palin, who was at the Alaska State Fair.

On August 27, Palin visited McCain's vacation home near Sedona, Arizona, where she was offered the position of vice-presidential candidate. According to Jill Hazelbaker, a spokeswoman for McCain, he had previously met Palin at the National Governors Association meeting in Washington in February 2008 and had come away "extraordinarily impressed." Palin was the only prospective running mate who had a face-to-face interview with McCain to discuss joining the ticket that week. Nonetheless, Palin's selection was a surprise to many because a main criticism he had of Obama was his lack of experience, and speculation had centered on other candidates, such as Minnesota governor Tim Pawlenty, Louisiana governor Bobby Jindal, former Massachusetts governor Mitt Romney, U.S. senator Joe Lieberman of Connecticut, and former Pennsylvania governor Tom Ridge. On August 29, in Dayton, Ohio, McCain introduced Palin as his running mate, making her the first Alaskan and the second woman to run on a major U.S. party ticket.

Palin was largely unknown outside Alaska before her selection by McCain. On September 1, 2008, Palin revealed that her daughter Bristol was pregnant and that she would marry the child's father, Levi Johnston. During this period, some Republicans felt that Palin was being unfairly attacked by the media. Timothy Noah of Slate magazine predicted that Palin's acceptance speech would be "wildly overpraised" and might end speculation that she was unqualified for the job of vice president because the press had been beating her up for "various trivial shortcomings" and had lowered the expectations for her speech. On September 3, 2008, Palin delivered a 40-minute acceptance speech at the Republican National Convention that was well received and watched by more than 40 million people. Wall Street Journal writer Thomas Frank noted the irony in her unattributed quoting of right-wing faux populist Westbrook Pegler's treacly, "We grow good people in our small towns, with honesty and sincerity and dignity."

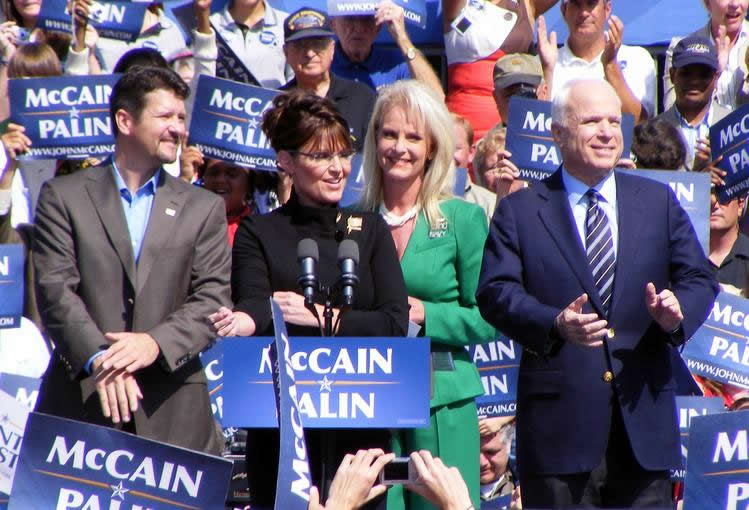
The Palins and McCains in Fairfax, Virginia, September 2008

During the campaign, controversy erupted over alleged differences between Palin's positions as a gubernatorial candidate and her position as a vice-presidential candidate. After McCain introduced Palin as his running mate, Newsweek and Time put Palin on their magazine covers, as some of the media alleged that McCain's campaign was restricting press access to Palin by allowing only three one-on-one interviews and no press conferences with her. Palin's first major interview, with Charles Gibson of ABC News, met with mixed reviews. Her interview five days later with Fox News Channel's Sean Hannity went more smoothly and focused on many of the same questions from Gibson's interview. Palin's performance in her third interview with Katie Couric, of CBS News, was widely criticized; her poll numbers declined, Republicans expressed concern that she was becoming a political liability, and some conservative commentators called for Palin to resign from the Presidential ticket. Other conservatives remained ardent in their support for Palin, accusing the columnists of elitism. Following this interview, some Republicans, including Mitt Romney and Bill Kristol, questioned the McCain campaign's strategy of sheltering Palin from unscripted encounters with the press.

Palin reportedly prepared intensively for the October 2 vice-presidential debate with Democratic vice-presidential nominee Joe Biden at Washington University in St. Louis. Some Republicans suggested that Palin's performance in the interviews would improve public perceptions of her debate performance by lowering expectations. Polling from CNN, Fox and CBS found that while Palin exceeded most voters' expectations, they felt that Biden had won the debate.

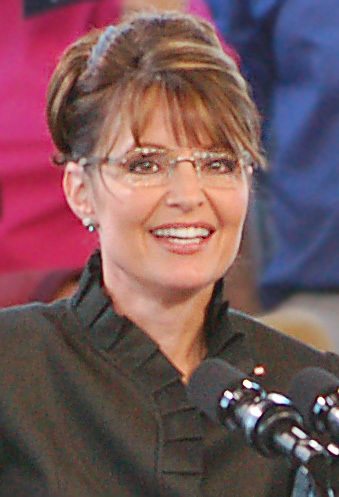
Sarah Palin at a campaign rally in Carson City, Nevada, September 13, 2008

Upon returning to the campaign trail after her debate preparation, Palin stepped up her attacks on the Democratic candidate for president, Illinois senator Barack Obama. At a fundraising event, Palin explained her new aggressiveness, saying, "There does come a time when you have to take the gloves off and that time is right now." Palin said that her first amendment right to "call Obama out on his associations" was threatened by "attacks by the mainstream media."

Palin appeared on Saturday Night Live's "Weekend Update" segment on October 18. Prior to her appearance, she had been memorably parodied several times by SNL cast member Tina Fey, who was noted for her physical resemblance to the candidate. In the weeks leading up to the election, Palin was also the subject of amateur parodies posted on YouTube.

Controversy arose after it was reported that the Republican National Committee (RNC) spent $150,000 of campaign contributions on clothing, hair styling, and makeup for Palin and her family in September 2008. Campaign spokespersons stated the clothing would be going to charity after the election. Palin and some media outlets blamed gender bias for the controversy. At the end of the campaign, Palin returned the clothes to the RNC.

The election took place on November 4, and Obama was projected as the winner at 11:00 PM EST. In his concession speech McCain thanked Palin, calling her "one of the best campaigners I've ever seen, and an impressive new voice in our party for reform and the principles that have always been our greatest strength." While aides were preparing the teleprompter for McCain's speech, they found a concession speech written for Palin by George W. Bush speechwriter Matthew Scully. Two members of McCain's staff, Steve Schmidt and Mark Salter, told Palin that there was no tradition of Election Night speeches by running mates, and that she would not be speaking. Palin appealed to McCain, who agreed with his staff.

Political scientists have debated the impact that Palin had on the outcome of the 2008 presidential election. A 2010 study in the journal Electoral Studies found that "her campaign performance cost McCain just under 2% of the final vote share." However, a 2013 study in the journal Political Research Quarterly failed to find an adverse impact.

== Post-2008 election ==
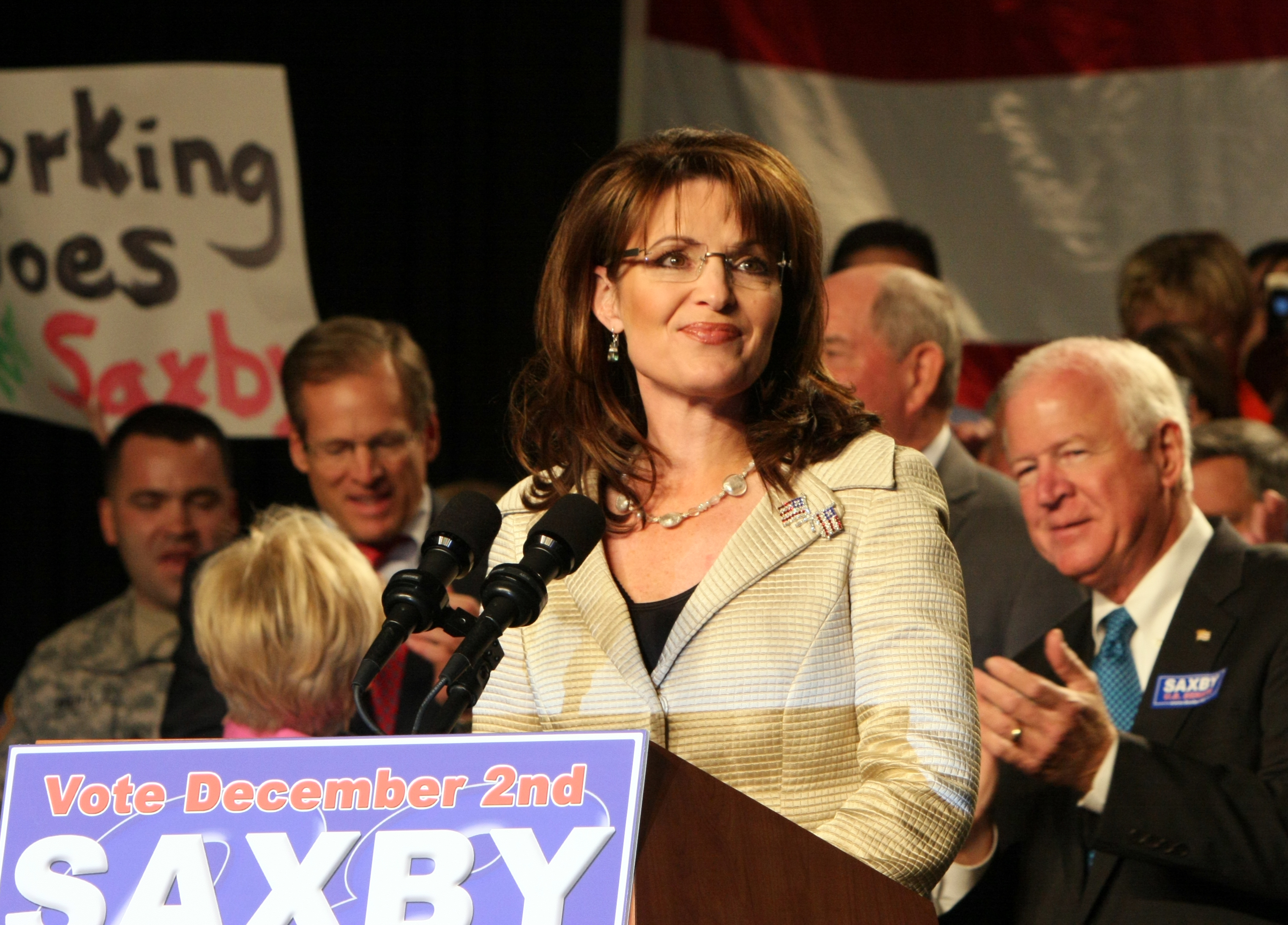
Palin rallies with Saxby Chambliss in Savannah, Georgia, December 2008.

Palin was the first guest on commentator Glenn Beck's Fox News television show on January 19, 2009, commenting on Barack Obama that he would be her president and that she would assist in any way to bring progress to the nation without abandoning her conservative views.

In August 2009, she coined the phrase "death panel", to describe rationing of care as part of the proposed health care reform. She stated that it would require Americans such as her parents or her child with Down syndrome, "to stand in front of Obama's 'death panel' so his bureaucrats can decide, based on a subjective judgment of their 'level of productivity in society,' whether they are worthy of health care." The phrase was criticized by many Democrats and Politifact named it the "Lie of the Year of 2009." However, conservatives disputed this and defended her use of the term.

In March 2010, Palin started a show to be aired on TLC called Sarah Palin's Alaska. The show was produced by Mark Burnett. Five million viewers tuned in for the premiere episode, a record for TLC. Palin also secured a segment on Fox News. Two guests that she was shown to have interviewed claimed to have never met her. Guests LL Cool J and Toby Keith stated that footage shown on the segment was actually taken from another interview with someone else, but was used in Palin's segment. Fox News and Palin ended this relationship in January 2013. But on June 13, 2013, Palin rejoined Fox News Channel as an analyst.

On December 8, 2010, it was reported that SarahPAC and Palin's personal credit card information were compromised through cyber attacks. Palin's team believed the attack was executed by Anonymous during Operation Payback. The report was met with skepticism in the blogosphere. Palin's email had been hacked once before in 2008.

=== SarahPAC ===
On January 27, 2009, Palin formed the political action committee, SarahPAC. Michael Glassner, a former aide to Palin, was appointed as the chief of staff of SarahPAC. The organization, which describes itself as an advocate of energy independence, supports candidates for federal and state office. Following her resignation as governor, Palin stated her intention to campaign "on behalf of candidates who believe in the right things, regardless of their party label or affiliation." It was reported that SarahPAC had raised nearly $1,000,000. A legal defense fund was set up to help Palin challenge ethics complaints, and it had collected approximately $250,000 by mid July 2009. In June 2010, Palin's defense fund was ruled illegal and was required to pay back $386,856 it collected in donations because it used Palin's position as governor to raise money for her personal gain. Palin subsequently set up a new defense fund. Sarah PAC was terminated as of December 31, 2016.

In the wake of the January 8, 2011, shooting of Rep. Gabrielle Giffords, Palin faced criticism for her SarahPAC website's inclusion of a political graphic that included a crosshair over Giffords's district. Palin responded on her Facebook page to the criticism, saying, "Acts of monstrous criminality stand on their own. They begin and end with the criminals who commit them", equating the accusations of her role in the shooting to a "blood libel".

=== Going Rogue and America by Heart ===
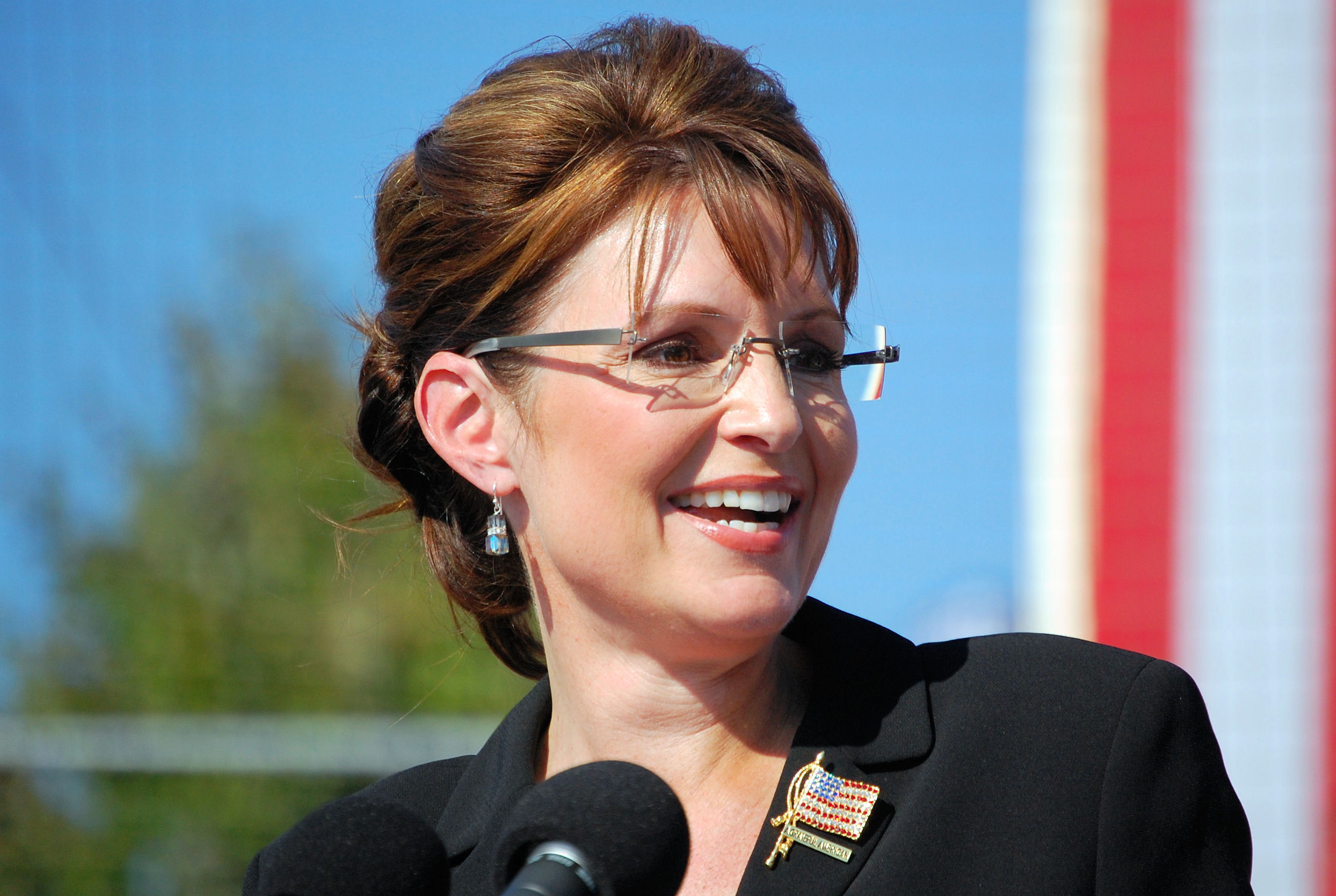
Palin on the campaign trail in 2008

In November 2009, Palin released her memoir, Going Rogue: An American Life, in which she details her private and political career, including her resignation as Governor of Alaska. Palin said she took the title from the phrase 'gone rogue' used by McCain staffers to describe her behavior when she spoke her mind on the issues during the campaign. The subtitle, "An American Life," mirrors the title of President Ronald Reagan's 1990 autobiography. Less than two weeks after its release, sales of the book exceeded the one million mark, with 300,000 copies sold the first day. Its bestseller rankings were comparable to memoirs by Bill Clinton, Hillary Clinton and Barack Obama.

Palin traveled to 11 states in a bus, with her family accompanying her, to promote the book. She made a number of media appearances as well, including a widely publicized interview on November 16, 2009, with Oprah Winfrey. In November 2010 HarperCollins released Palin's second book, titled America by Heart. The book contains excerpts from Palin's favorite speeches, sermons and literature as well as portraits of people Palin admires, including some she met in rural America on her first book tour.

=== Tea Party movement ===
On February 6, 2010, Palin was the keynote speaker at the first Tea Party convention in Nashville, Tennessee. Palin said the Tea Party movement is "the future of politics in America." She criticized Obama for rising deficits, and for "apologizing for America" in speeches in other countries. Palin said Obama was weak on the war on terror for allowing the so-called Christmas bomber to board a plane headed for the United States.

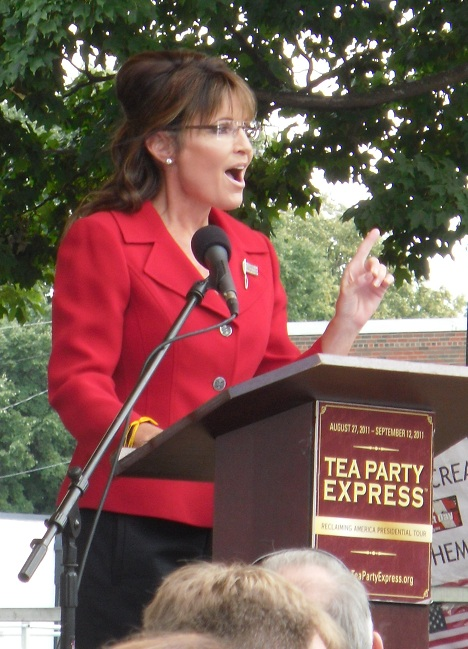
Palin addressing a Labor Day rally sponsored by the Tea Party Express (Manchester, NH), 2011

In 2011, Palin was the keynote speaker at an annual tax day tea party rally at the Wisconsin State Capitol in Madison sponsored by Americans for Prosperity, a conservative political advocacy group headquartered in Arlington, Virginia, and a featured speaker at a Tea Party Express rally in Manchester, New Hampshire, at which Palin urged members of the Tea Party movement to avoid internal bickering with establishment Republicans.

=== 2010 endorsements ===
In mid-2010, Palin positioned herself as a champion of conservative Republican women, calling for a "whole stampede of pink elephants" in the 2010 midterm elections. She endorsed a number of female Republican candidates in primary elections, including Karen Handel, who unsuccessfully sought the Republican nomination for Governor of Georgia in the 2010 election. After multiple Palin-endorsed candidates lost their races, a spokesman for the House Democratic campaign operation, Ryan Rudominer, called her involvement a "great thing across the board". She spoke at a May 2010 fundraiser for the Susan B. Anthony List, an anti-abortion political advocacy group and political action committee that supports pro-life women in politics, in which she coined the term "mama grizzly".

Palin endorsed Nikki Haley for the Republican nomination for Governor of South Carolina three weeks before the election. At the time of the endorsement, Haley was polling behind three other Republicans; she ended up winning the nomination and the general election. According to ABC News, "pundits credited the notable endorsements of tea party groups, former state first lady Jenny Sanford, and former Alaska Gov. Sarah Palin with legitimizing" Haley's candidacy "in the face of the state's male-dominated political establishment".

In the months ahead of the November 2010 elections, Palin endorsed 64 Republican candidates, and was a significant fundraising asset to those she campaigned for during the primary season. According to Politico, Palin's criteria for endorsing candidates was whether they had the support of the Tea Party movement and the support of the Susan B. Anthony List. In terms of success, Palin was 7–2 for Senate endorsements; 7–6 for House endorsements; and 6–3 in endorsements of gubernatorial candidates in races that were considered 'competitive'. Palin's endorsement of Joe Miller in the August 24 Alaska primary election for U.S. Senator was identified as a pivotal moment in Miller's upset of the incumbent Republican senator Lisa Murkowski. After losing the Republican Party primary to Miller, Murkowski ran as a write-in candidate, defeating both Miller and Democrat Scott McAdams in the general election, winning with a plurality.

According to The Daily Beast reporter Shushannah Walshe, Christine O'Donnell's unlikely prospects of upsetting establishment Republican candidate Mike Castle "changed overnight" due to Palin's endorsement. O'Donnell defeated Castle in the September 14 primary for Joe Biden's former Senate seat in Delaware. Her O'Donnell endorsement further increased tensions between Palin and the Republican establishment: leading conservative commentator Charles Krauthammer described the endorsement as "reckless and irresponsible". In 2010, former congressman and influential TV host Joe Scarborough urged his party to dissociate itself from her. Party strategist Karl Rove argued that Palin's endorsement of O'Donnell may have cost the GOP the Delaware Senate seat, and Politico's Ben Smith posited that Palin's support of O'Donnell helped dash Republican hopes of regaining control of the U.S. Senate.

Another Palin endorsement carried Nevada's Sharron Angle to a 40.1% primary win, in the race to beat highly endangered incumbent Senate majority leader Harry Reid. Reid prevailed 50.3% to 44.6% in the 2010 election despite losing 14 of Nevada's 17 counties. Angle had led by as much as 11% in March and June Rasmussen polling.

Palin's influence over the primaries increased speculation that she would seek to be the party's nominee for president in 2012, with political pundits such as David Frum and Jonathan Chait identifying Palin as the front-runner.

=== 2012 election cycle and candidacy speculation ===
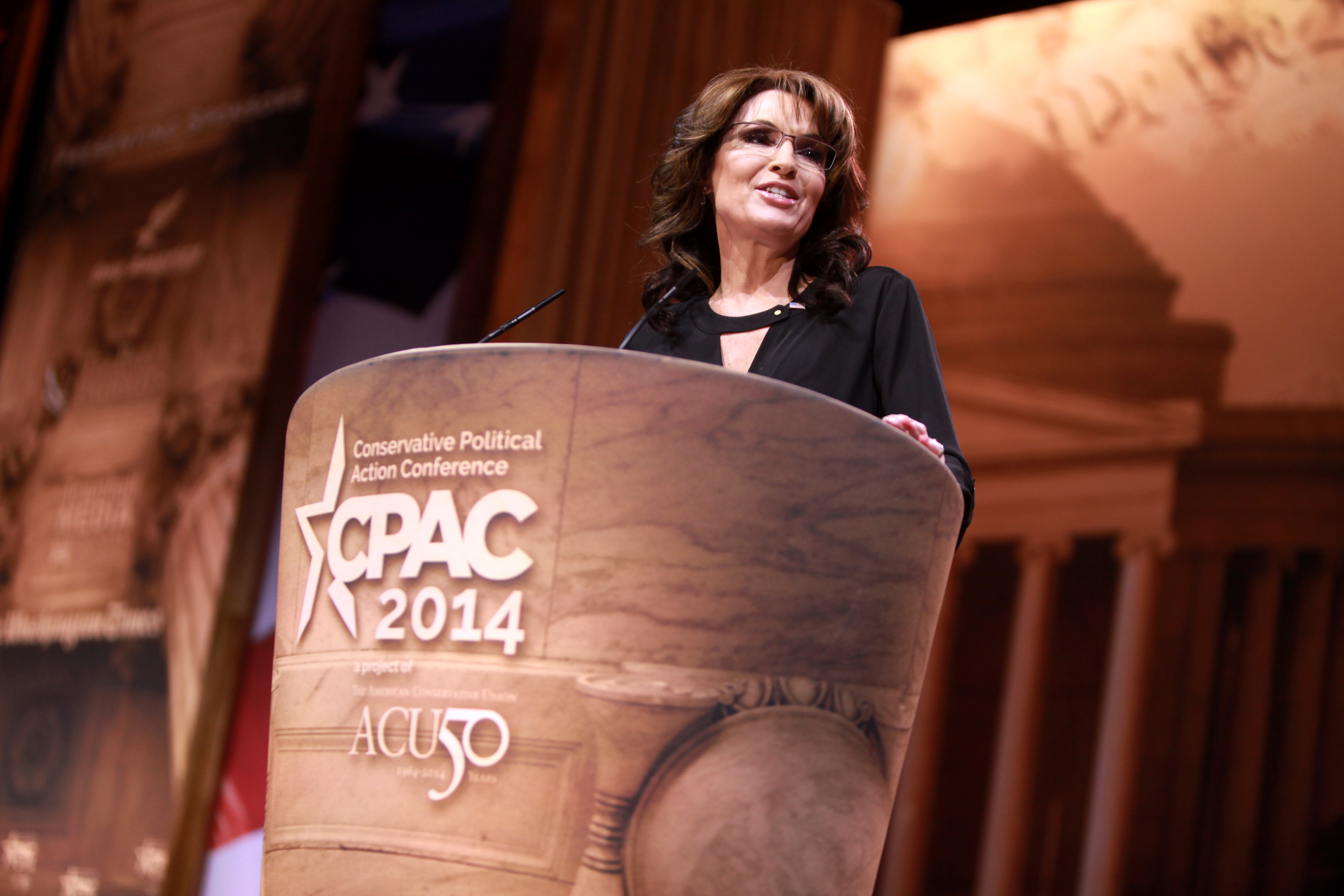
Palin speaking at the 2014 Conservative Political Action Conference (CPAC) in National Harbor, Maryland

Beginning in November 2008, following Palin's high profile in the presidential campaign, an active "Draft Palin" movement started. On February 6, 2010, when asked on Fox News whether she would run for president in 2012, she replied, "I would be willing to if I believe that it's right for the country." In November 2010, Palin confirmed that she was considering running for the White House, but realized that her level of experience could make it difficult to win the nomination and criticized the "lamestream media" for focusing attention on her personal life. In March 2011, Palin said, "It's time that a woman is president of the United States of America." On October 5, 2011, Palin said she had decided not to seek the Republican nomination for president.

=== 2014 Alaska gubernatorial election endorsement ===
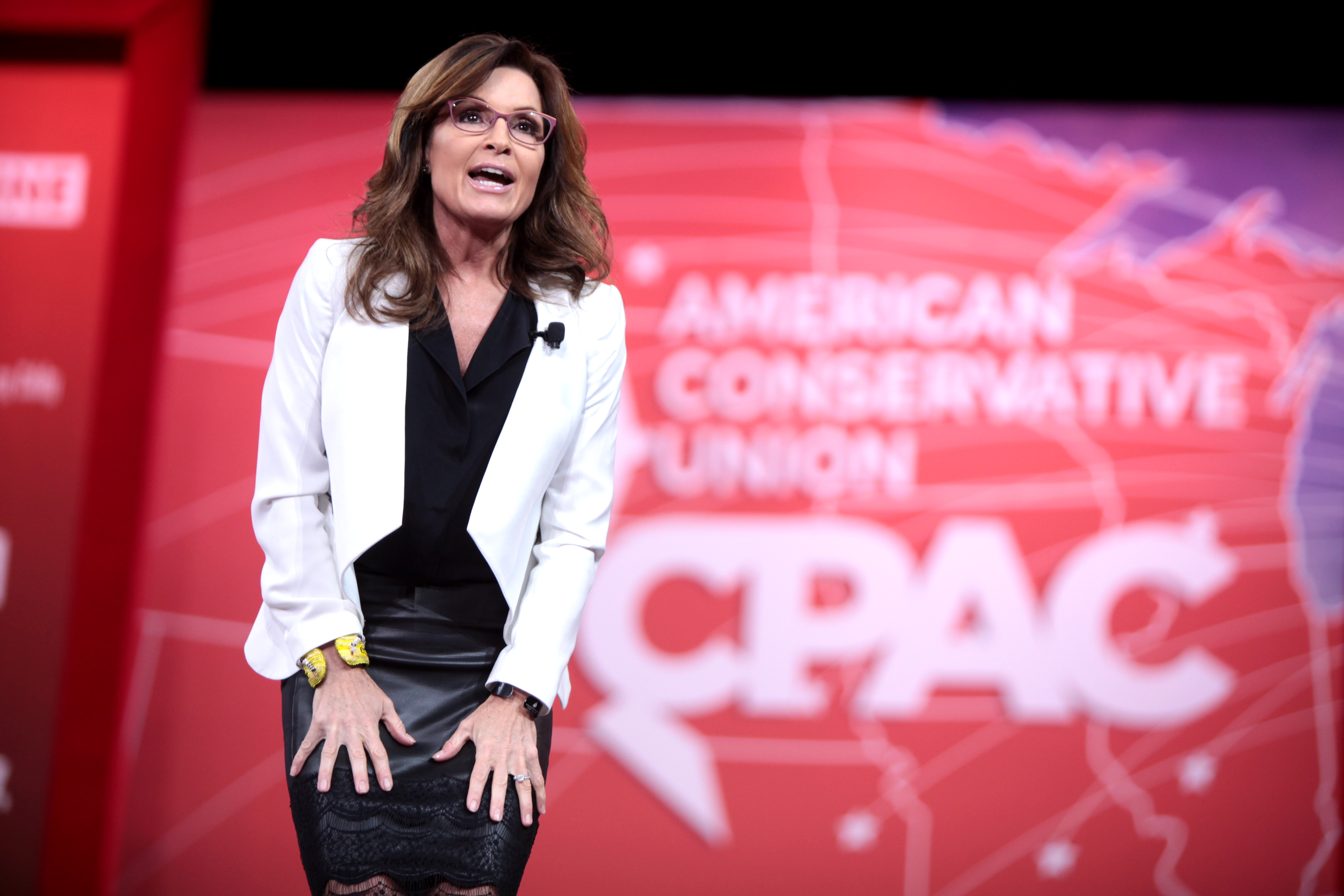
Palin speaking at the 2015 CPAC in National Harbor

In October 2014, Palin endorsed the "unity ticket" of Independent Bill Walker and Democrat Byron Mallott in the 2014 Alaska gubernatorial election, which ran against her successor and former lieutenant governor, Sean Parnell. The endorsement was prompted by Parnell's oil-and-gas industry tax-cuts, which dismantled her administration's "Alaska's Clear and Equitable Share" (ACES) plan. She had previously supported a referendum to repeal the tax cuts, which was narrowly defeated in August 2014. Walker and Mallott made the repeal of the tax cuts a centerpiece of their campaign. Walker and Mallott won the governorship in the November 2014 election with 48.1 percent of the vote, versus 45.9 percent for the Republican ticket.

=== 2016 endorsements ===
In January 2016, Palin endorsed Donald Trump for president of the United States.

In a May 2016 interview with CNN's Jake Tapper, Palin said she would work to defeat Republican speaker of the House Paul Ryan. Palin cited Ryan's reluctance to support Trump for president. In early August, Palin said again that she supported Paul Nehlen, a little-known Republican challenger to Ryan, despite Trump's support of Ryan. A few days later, Ryan overwhelmingly defeated Nehlen in the Republican primary, taking over 84 percent of the vote.

=== 2017 defamation lawsuit ===
In June 2017, Palin filed a defamation lawsuit against The New York Times for an editorial accusing Palin of "political incitement" in the run-up to the 2011 shooting of Democratic congresswoman Gabrielle Giffords. The Times pointed out that a link to an advertisement from Palin's political action committee showed stylized crosshairs over the congressional districts held by 20 Democrats, including Giffords. The Times later issued a correction, stating that no connection between the Palin advertisement and the Giffords shooting had been established and clarifying that what was depicted in the crosshairs in the ad were "electoral districts, not individual Democratic lawmakers." The Times wrote that the error did not "undercut or weaken the argument of the piece". In subsequent testimony at an evidentiary hearing, Times editorial page editor James Bennet stated that the editorial sought to make a point about heated political rhetoric and was not intended to blame Palin for the attack on Giffords.

Palin's lawsuit was dismissed by the U.S. District Court for the Southern District of New York in August 2017. Judge Jed S. Rakoff ruled that Palin had failed to show actual malice on the part of the Times. In August 2019, the U.S. Circuit Court of Appeals for the Second Circuit reinstated Palin's suit, ruling that the district court erred when it held an evidentiary hearing on the newspaper's motion to dismiss rather than deciding the newspaper's motion to dismiss on the pleadings. In August 2020, Rakoff denied both sides' motions for summary judgment and ordered a jury trial. As the first libel case against the Times to go to trial in the U.S. in 18 years, the suit was closely watched among First Amendment scholars. On February 15, 2022, the jury reached a unanimous verdict in favor of The New York Times, finding that Palin had not proven actual malice. Jurors were aware that the previous day Rakoff said he would dismiss the case regardless of their verdict after some jurors had received push notifications on their smart phones, though jurors said it did not affect their deliberations. The 2nd U.S. Circuit Court of Appeals in Manhattan revived the case in August 2024 citing mistakes by the judge, particularly his announcement during jury deliberations that he would dismiss the case. On April 22, 2025, a federal jury found the Times was not liable for defamation against Palin.

=== 2022 House of Representatives candidacy ===
In August 2021, Palin had hinted at a possible Senate bid, challenging incumbent centrist Republican Lisa Murkowski. After the death of Alaska's at-large congressman Don Young, Palin instead ran in the 2022 special election for the vacated congressional seat. On April 3, 2022, former president Donald Trump endorsed her run for the House of Representatives.

Palin was one of the three remaining of 50 initial candidates in the 2022 Alaska's at-large congressional district special election. Al Gross, an independent, had dropped out of the "top four" runoff, leaving two Republicans remaining, Palin and Nick Begich III, along with Democratic ex-state House member, Alaska Native Mary Peltola.

Palin lost the special ranked choice election to Peltola following counting on August 31. She received 58,328 votes (30.9%) in the first round, and 85,987 votes (48.5%) once Begich's second preferences had been transferred.

After she lost the race to fill the remainder of Young's term, Palin urged Begich to drop out of the November election for the two-year term, but he refused to do so. She later lost the general election in November by an even larger margin, receiving 25.7% of the vote in the first round to Peltola's 48.8%, then 45% in the second round, to Peltola's 55%.

== Political positions ==
Palin has been a registered Republican since 1982.

=== Health care ===
Palin opposed the 2010 health care reform package, saying it would lead to rationing of health care by a bureaucracy, which she described using the term "death panels". This legislation is the Patient Protection and Affordable Care Act, as modified by the Health Care and Education Reconciliation Act of 2010. She opposes abortion, including in cases of rape and incest, though she supports it if the mother's life is in jeopardy. She also opposes embryonic stem cell research. She supports parental consent as a requirement for female minors seeking an abortion.

=== Social issues ===
Palin opposes same-sex marriage and supports capital punishment. She has also called marijuana use a "minimal issue" and suggested that arresting cannabis users should be a low priority for local police. Although she opposes full legalization, she admits to smoking marijuana recreationally when it was legal in Alaska.

=== Education ===
Palin supports sex education in public schools that encourages sexual abstinence along with teaching about contraception. She also supports discussion of creationism during lessons on evolution in public schools. Palin believes evolution "should be taught as an accepted principle" and said that her belief in God's role in Earth's creation "is not part of the state policy or a local curriculum in a school district. Science should be taught in science class." (See Creation–evolution controversy.)

=== Guns ===
A Life Member of the National Rifle Association of America (NRA), Palin interprets the Second Amendment as including the right to handgun possession and opposes bans on semi-automatic firearms. She supports gun safety education for youth.

=== Environment ===
Palin supports off-shore drilling, and land-based drilling in the Arctic National Wildlife Refuge. When commenting on the Gulf Coast oil disaster Palin said, "I repeat the slogan 'drill here, drill now.'" She said, "I want our country to be able to trust the oil industry." Palin asked supporters to read an article by Thomas Sowell that criticized Obama for having BP pay to an escrow fund.

Palin considers herself a conservationist and during the 2008 campaign said "of global warming, climate change, whether it's entirely, wholly caused by man's activities or is part of the cyclical nature of our planet...John McCain and I agree that we have to make sure that we're doing all we can to cut down on pollution." She opposed cap-and-trade proposals contained in the yet to be defeated ACES energy bill. Speaking at a 2009 Department of Interior hearing, Palin acknowledged that "many believe" a global effort to reduce greenhouse gases is needed. She stated, "[S]topping domestic energy production of preferred fuels does not solve the issues associated with global warming and threatened or endangered species, but it can make them worse... These available fuels are required to supply the nation's energy needs during the transition to green energy alternatives." After the election and the Climatic Research Unit email controversy, Palin spoke at a 2010 California logging conference calling studies supporting the scientific consensus on climate change "snake oil science". She attacked what she called "heavy-handed" environmental laws and cited her 2008 suit, as Alaska's governor, against the federal government to overturn the listing of polar bears as a threatened species. She considered environmental regulations as an economic burden to businesses trying to recover from the recession and environmental activists as wanting to "lock up the land".

=== Foreign policy ===
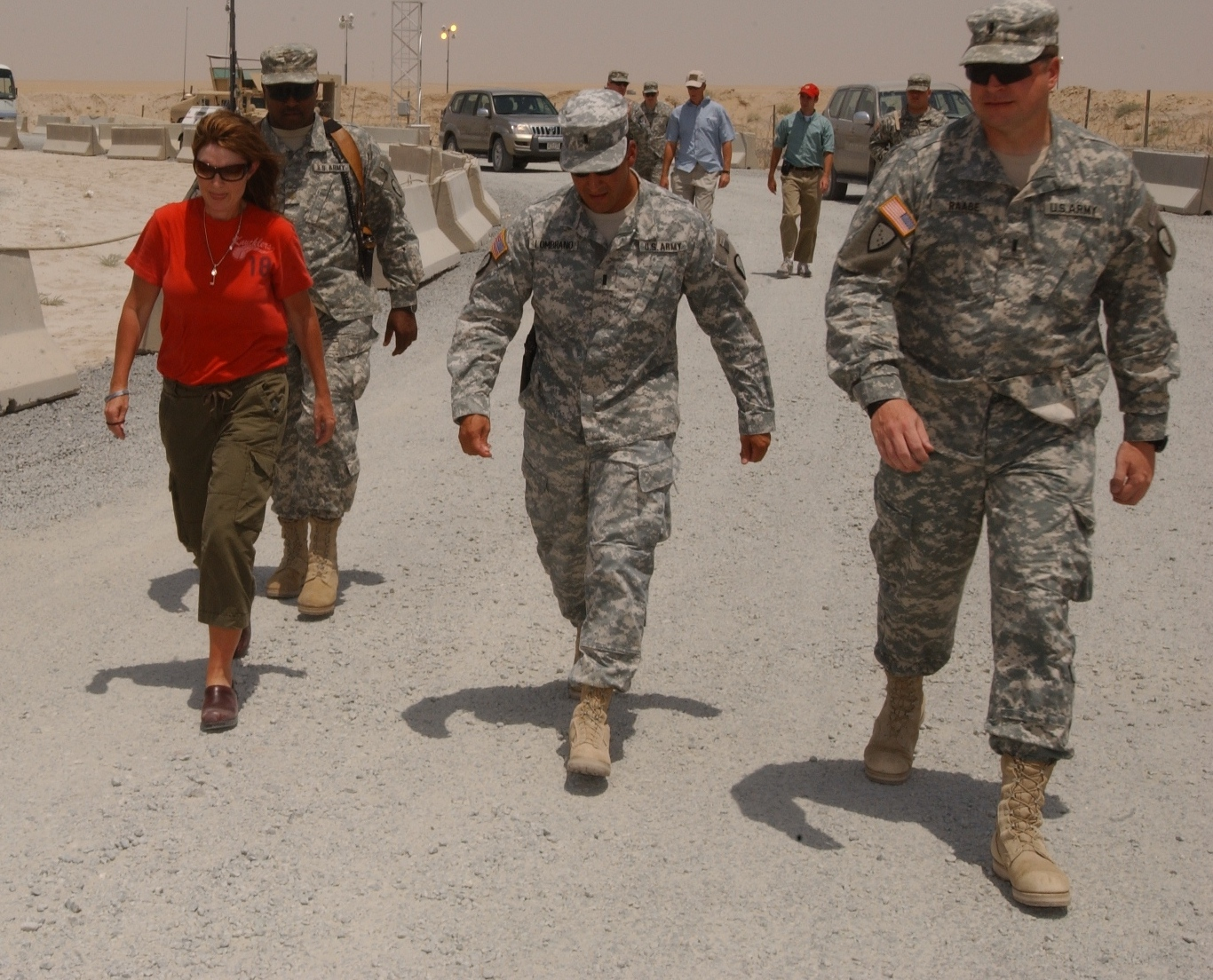
Palin (red shirt) in Kuwait, July 26, 2007

Palin is a strong supporter of Israel. Referring to Iran's threat to Israel, Palin said Obama would be reelected if "he played the war card. Say he decided to declare war on Iran or decided really come out and do whatever he could to support Israel, which I would like him to do."

On foreign policy, Palin supported the George W. Bush administration's policies in Iraq, but was concerned that "dependence on foreign energy" may be obstructing efforts to "have an exit plan in place". Palin supports preemptive military action in the face of an imminent threat, and supports U.S. military operations in Pakistan. She also supported the surge strategy in Iraq, the use of additional ground forces in Afghanistan, and, in general, maintaining a strong defensive posture by increasing the defense budget.

Palin opposed the Obama administration's proposed 2013 military intervention in Syrian Civil War, suggesting to let "Allah sort it out" in the Syrian Civil War.

In 2008, Palin supported NATO membership for Ukraine and Georgia, and affirms that if Russia invaded a NATO member, the United States should meet its treaty obligations. During the 2022 Russian invasion of Ukraine, Palin advocated for a reduction in U.S. military aid to Ukraine and criticized U.S. involvement in the conflict.

Palin opposed the Joint Comprehensive Plan of Action which placed limits on Iran's nuclear program, on the grounds that the treaty was not strict enough. In a September 9, 2015, speech, she said, "Only in an Orwellian Obama world full of sparkly fairy dust blown from atop his unicorn as he's peeking through a pretty pink kaleidoscope would he ever see victory or safety for America or Israel in this treaty."

== Television appearances ==
In 2016, Palin appeared as a guest panel on the Season 1 Finale of the ABC-rebooted Match Game

In 2020, Palin competed in season three of The Masked Singer as "Bear". She was the first of Group C to be eliminated and stated to Nick Cannon that she did it as a 'walking middle finger to the haters'.

== Personal life ==
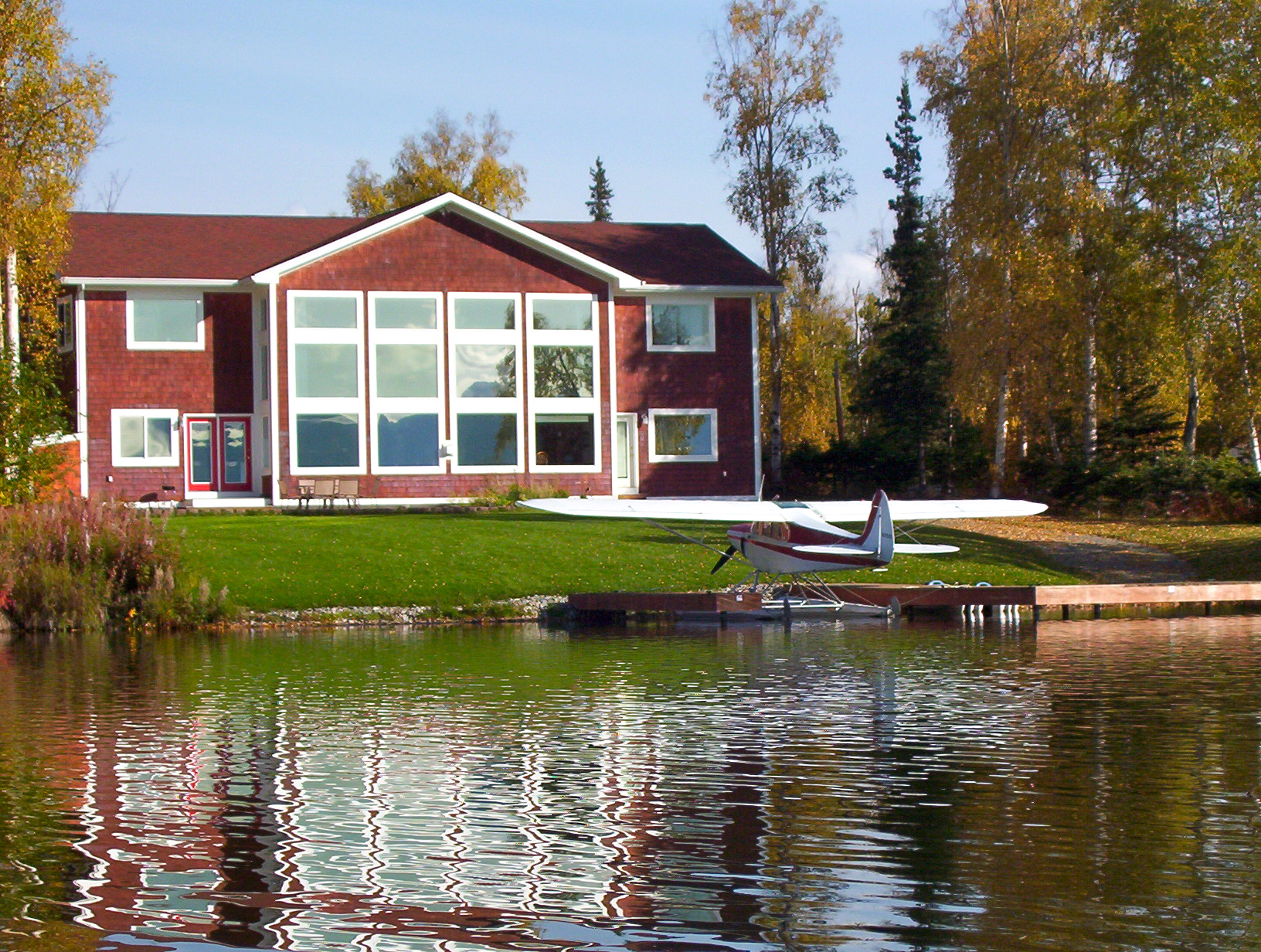
The Palins' home in Wasilla

In August 1988, Palin eloped with Todd Palin, her high-school sweetheart, and together they have five children: son Track Charles James (born 1989) and daughters Bristol Sheeran Marie (born 1990), Willow Bianca Faye (born 1994), and Piper Indy Grace (born 2001). Their youngest son, Trig, born 2008, was prenatally diagnosed with Down syndrome.

Todd Palin worked for oil company BP as an oil-field production operator, retiring in 2009. He owns a commercial fishing business.

Palin was "baptized Catholic as a newborn" as her mother, Sally, had been raised Catholic. However, the Heath family "started going to non-denominational churches" thereafter. Later, her family joined the Wasilla Assembly of God, a Pentecostal church, which she attended until 2002. Palin then switched to the Wasilla Bible Church. Immediately after McCain named her as his running mate, several news reports called her the first Pentecostal/charismatic believer to appear on a major-party ticket. However, Palin herself eschews the "Pentecostal" or "charismatic" label, describing herself as a "Bible-believing Christian".

Todd filed for divorce from Sarah on August 29, 2019, citing "incompatibility of temperament". He requested an equal division of debts and assets, and to have joint custody of their son, Trig. The divorce was finalized on March 23, 2020.

In early 2022, Palin was reported to be in a relationship with Ron Duguay, a former NHL player for the New York Rangers. He confirmed they were dating in February that year. After Duguay's death in October 2026, Palin, together with his family, attended a Rangers game honoring him.

== Public image ==
In June 2008, the Alumni Association of North Idaho College gave Palin its Distinguished Alumni Achievement Award.

Prior to the 2008 Republican National Convention, a Gallup poll found that a majority of voters were unfamiliar with Sarah Palin. During her campaign to become vice president, 39% said Palin was ready to serve as president if needed, 33% said Palin was not, and 29% had no opinion. This was "the lowest vote of confidence in a running mate since the elder George Bush chose then-Indiana senator Dan Quayle to join his ticket in 1988." Following the convention, her image came under close media scrutiny, particularly with regard to her religious perspective on public life, her socially conservative views, and her perceived lack of experience or intelligence. Palin's lack of experience in foreign and domestic politics was criticized by conservatives as well as liberals following her nomination. At the same time, Palin became more popular than John McCain among Republicans.

One month after being introduced as McCain's running mate, she was viewed both more favorably and unfavorably among voters than her Democratic opponent, Delaware Senator Joe Biden. A plurality of the television audience rated Biden's performance higher at the 2008 vice-presidential debate.

Media outlets repeated Palin's statement that she "stood up to Big Oil" when she resigned after 11 months as the head of the Alaska Oil and Gas Conservation Commission. She said it was because of abuses she witnessed involving other Republican commissioners and their ties to energy companies and energy lobbyists; she claimed to have confronted the industry when she raised taxes on oil companies as governor. In turn, others have said that Palin is a "friend of Big Oil" due to her advocacy for oil exploration and development including for drilling in the Arctic National Wildlife Refuge and for the de-listing of the polar bear as an endangered species.

Since 2017, Palin has spoken out in support of Julian Assange and in 2020 she called for him to be pardoned, saying, "I am the first one to admit when I make a mistake and I admit that I made a mistake some years ago, not supporting Julian Assange, thinking that he was a bad guy”.

Palin was named one of United States "10 Most Fascinating People of 2008" by Barbara Walters for an ABC special on December 4, 2008. In April 2010, she was selected as one of the world's 100 most influential people by Time magazine.

== Electoral history ==
1992 Wasilla City Council Seat E election
| Party | Candidate | Votes | % |
|---|---|---|---|
| Nonpartisan | Sarah Palin | 530 | 54.92 |
| Nonpartisan | John Hartrick | 310 | 32.12 |
| Write-in | Others | 125 | 12.95 |
| Total votes | | 965 | |

1996 Wasilla mayoral election
| Party | Candidate | Votes | % |
|---|---|---|---|
| Nonpartisan | Sarah H. Palin | 651 | 57.66 |
| Nonpartisan | John C. Stein (incumbent) | 440 | 38.97 |
| Nonpartisan | Cliff Silvers | 36 | 3.19 |
| Write-in | Others | 2 | 0.18 |
| Total votes | | 965 | |

1999 Wasilla mayoral election
| Party | Candidate | Votes | % |
|---|---|---|---|
| Nonpartisan | Sarah Palin (incumbent) | 909 | 73.60 |
| Nonpartisan | John Stein | 292 | 23.64 |
| Nonpartisan | Cliff Silvers | 32 | 2.59 |
| Write-in | Others | 2 | 0.16 |
| Turnout | | 1,235 | 32.62 |

2006 Alaska gubernatorial Republican primary
| Party | Candidate | Votes | % |
|---|---|---|---|
| Republican | Sarah Palin | 51,443 | 50.59 |
| Republican | John Binkley | 30,349 | 29.84 |
| Republican | Frank Murkowski (incumbent) | 19,412 | 19.09 |
| Republican | Gerald Heikes | 280 | 0.28 |
| Republican | Merica Hlatcu | 211 | 0.21 |
| Total votes | | 101,695 | 100.00 |

2006 Alaska gubernatorial election
| Party | Candidate | Votes | % | ±% |
|---|---|---|---|---|
| Republican | Sarah Palin | 114,697 | 48.33 | −7.6 |
| Democratic | Tony Knowles | 97,238 | 40.97 | +0.3 |
| Independent | Andrew Halcro | 22,443 | 9.46 | n/a |
| Independence | Don Wright | 1,285 | 0.54 | −0.4 |
| Libertarian | Billy Toien | 682 | 0.29 | −0.2 |
| Green | David Massie | 593 | 0.25 | −1.0 |
| Write-in candidate | Write-in votes | 384 | 0.16 | +0.1 |
| Plurality | | 17,459 | 7.36 | |
| Turnout | | 238,307 | 51.1 | |
| Republican hold | | Swing | -7.6 | |

2008 United States presidential election
| Party | Presidential Candidate | Vice Presidential Candidate | Popular vote | | Electoral vote |
| Party | Presidential Candidate | Vice Presidential Candidate | Count | Percentage | Electoral vote |
|---|---|---|---|---|---|
| Democratic Party | Barack Obama | Joe Biden | 69,456,897 | 52.92% | 365 |
| Republican Party | John McCain | Sarah Palin | 59,934,786 | 45.66% | 173 |
| Independent | Ralph Nader | Matt Gonzalez | 738,475 | 0.56% | 0 |
| Libertarian Party | Bob Barr | Wayne Allyn Root | 523,686 | 0.40% | 0 |
| Green | Cynthia McKinney | Rosa Clemente | 161,603 | 0.12% | 0 |
| Other | | | 226,908 | 0.17% | 0 |
| Total | | | 131,241,669 | 100% | 538 |

2022 Alaska's at-large congressional district special election
| Party | Candidate | Round 1 | | | Round 2 | |
| Party | Candidate | Votes | % | Transfer | Votes | % |
|---|---|---|---|---|---|---|
| Democratic | Mary Peltola | 74,807 | 39.66% | +17,000 | 91,206 | 51.47% |
| Republican | Sarah Palin | 58,328 | 30.93% | +27,659 | 85,987 | 48.53% |
| Republican | Nick Begich | 52,504 | 27.84% | -52,504 | Eliminated | |
| Write-in | | 2,971 | 1.58% | -2,971 | Eliminated | |
| Total votes | | 188,610 | 100.00% | | 177,193 | 94.29% |
| Inactive ballots | | 0 | 0.00% | +10,726 | 10,726 | 5.71% |
| Democratic gain from Republican | | | | | | |

2022 Alaska's at-large congressional district election
| Party | Candidate | Round 1 | | | Round 2 | | | Round 3 | |
| Party | Candidate | Votes | % | Transfer | Votes | % | Transfer | Votes | % |
|---|---|---|---|---|---|---|---|---|---|
| Democratic | Mary Peltola (incumbent) | 128,329 | 48.68% | +1,038 | 129,433 | 49.20% | +7,460 | 136,893 | 54.94% |
| Republican | Sarah Palin | 67,732 | 25.74% | +1,064 | 69,242 | 26.32% | +43,013 | 112,255 | 45.06% |
| Republican | Nick Begich | 61,431 | 23.34% | +1,988 | 64,392 | 24.48% | -64,392 | Eliminated | |
| Libertarian | Chris Bye | 4,560 | 1.73% | -4,560 | Eliminated | | | | |
| Write-in | | 1,096 | 0.42% | -1,096 | Eliminated | | | | |
| Total votes | | 263,148 | 100.00% | | 263,067 | 100.00% | | 249,148 | 100.00% |
| Inactive ballots | | 2,193 | 0.83% | +906 | 3,097 | 1.16% | +14,765 | 17,016 | 5.55% |
| Democratic hold | | | | | | | | | |

== Publications ==
- Going Rogue: An American Life, HarperCollins, 2009
- America by Heart: Reflections on Family, Faith, and Flag, HarperCollins, 2010
- Good Tidings and Great Joy: Protecting the Heart of Christmas, HarperCollins, 2013
- Sweet Freedom: A Devotional, Regnery Publishing, 2015

== See also ==
- List of female governors in the United States
- List of female United States presidential and vice presidential candidates

Political offices
| Preceded by Frank Murkowski | Governor of Alaska; 2006–2009 | Succeeded by Sean Parnell |
Party political offices
| Preceded by Frank Murkowski | Republican nominee for Governor of Alaska; 2006 | Succeeded by Sean Parnell |
| Preceded by Dick Cheney | Republican nominee for Vice President of the United States; 2008 | Succeeded by Paul Ryan |
U.S. order of precedence (ceremonial)
| Preceded by Tony Knowles as Former Governor | Order of precedence of the United States | Succeeded by Sean Parnell as Former Governor |
