= Going Rogue =

2009 memoir by Sarah Palin

Going Rogue: An American Life
- Author: Sarah Palin with Lynn Vincent
- Cover artist: Photo: John Keatley; Design: Archie Ferguson
- Language: English
- Subject: Politics, Alaska
- Genre: Autobiography, memoir
- Publisher: Harper
- Publication date: November 17, 2009 (hardcover); August 24, 2010 (paperback)
- Publication place: United States
- Media type: Print (hardcover and paperback), audiobook, e-book
- Pages: 432 (hardcover); 448 (paperback)
- ISBN: 978-0061939891 (hardcover) 978-0061939907 (paperback)
- OCLC: 441761706
- Followed by: America by Heart: Reflections on Family, Faith, and Flag

Going Rogue: An American Life (2009) is a memoir by politician Sarah Palin, former governor of Alaska and 2008 Republican candidate for U.S. Vice President on the ticket with Senator John McCain. She wrote it with journalist Lynn Vincent.

The book became a #1 New York Times Best Seller in its first week of release, and remained at that spot for six weeks. Shortly after its release, it was one of four political memoirs published since the 1990s to sell more than two million copies.

== Writing process ==
The book deal was announced in May 2009 when Palin was still governor of Alaska. She said that she wanted the public to hear her true story, "unrestrained and unfiltered". She reportedly received an advance of $1.25 million from publisher HarperCollins, with two projected additional payouts of between $2.5 million and $5 million each.

Palin announced that although she would have a ghostwriter to help, she would be doing a lot of the writing herself, employing her journalism skills and the personal diaries and notes that she had kept throughout her life. Critics questioned whether Palin could write a book.

Responding to concerns that writing and promoting the book would interfere with her duties as governor, Palin said she would only work on the book after hours and would promote the book "schedule permitting". The Alaska Department of Law issued a legal opinion which okayed the project, stating, "A book publication project is compatible with your position as governor so long as it does not interfere with your official duties".

Conservative journalist and author Lynn Vincent worked on the book with Palin for several weeks shortly after she resigned the governorship in the summer of 2009. Palin met with HarperCollins editors for intensive editing sessions in New York City. HarperCollins publisher Jonathan Burnham said that Palin had been "unbelievably conscientious and hands-on at every stage", adding that the book was "her words, her life ... in full and fascinating detail". HarperCollins had planned publication for spring 2010, but later moved the date to November 17, 2009, as the book was completed earlier than expected. The publisher attributed completion of the memoir early to Palin's devoting full-time to the writing process after she left office. A paperback version of the book, with new material, released on August 24, 2010.

== Summary and themes ==
The first part of the book is devoted to Palin's life before the 2008 campaign; the second part details her life as a candidate for national office. Palin discusses the disagreements she had with her running mate John McCain's campaign advisers, criticizes the national media, and talks about the importance of religion and family life.

The "Going Rogue" part of the title refers to criticism leveled at Palin by McCain campaign advisers that she was straying from their carefully crafted message and publicly disagreeing with McCain on several issues. The subtitle, "An American Life", mirrors the title of President Ronald Reagan's 1990 autobiography.

Palin ends the book by quoting her own father saying, "Sarah's not retreating, she's reloading.", suggesting she would return to public life.

== Commercial and critical reception ==
Going Rogue was available for pre-order between $9 and $10 during a price war among online retailers Amazon, Target.com, and Walmart.com. Dan Calabrese, writing in the North Star National, called the sales "an absolutely unprecedented performance for a non-fiction book so far in advance of its release date".

Less than two weeks after its release, sales of the book exceeded one million, putting it in a class with memoirs by Bill Clinton, Hillary Clinton and Barack Obama. The print run was extended to 2.8 million copies from 1.5 million. Going Rogue attained sales of over 2.7 million by December 1, 2009, and was number one on The New York Times Best Seller list for six consecutive weeks.

According to campaign records, late in 2009, Palin used $63,000 of donations from SarahPAC, her political action committee, to purchase copies of her book, "Going Rogue". The expenditures were listed as, "books for fundraising donor fulfillment". Meghan Stapleton, Palin's spokeswoman, stated the purchased books were autographed and awarded to donors contributing more than $100 to Palin's PAC.

=== Analysis and reactions ===
A team of eleven reporters for the Associated Press challenged some of Palin's statements as factually incorrect, such as her assertions that she traveled frugally, avoided large campaign donors, was against the Wall Street bailouts of 2008, and entered politics for purely altruistic reasons. Their analysis concluded by speculating that the book was "a pre-campaign manifesto". According to Fox News, an AP spokesman "confirmed 11 people worked on the story . . . but refused to say if similar number of journalists were assigned to review other political books, or if Palin has been treated differently". Fox also reported "The (AP) organization did not review for accuracy recent books by the late Senator Ted Kennedy, then-Senator Joe Biden, either book by Barack Obama released before he was president, or autobiographies by Bill or Hillary Clinton." Conservative talk show host John Ziegler objected to the AP piece, saying that the AP is extremely biased and "badly missing the most important points of Sarah Palin's book".

The Huffington Post had an article titled "The First Ten Lies from Going Rogue", including the failure to credit ghostwriter Vincent on the cover, Palin's statement about legal bills she incurred relating to ethics complaints, without disclosing that most of the bills resulted from complaints she filed as a tactic in connection with Troopergate; and her assertion that she had to pay $50,000 in fees to be vetted by the McCain campaign.

Palin replied: "As is expected, the AP and a number of subsequent media outlets are erroneously reporting the contents of the book".

Former McCain campaign aides "hit back", according to Politico, "calling the former vice presidential nominee's soon-to-be released book 'revisionist and self serving' 'fiction'."

A representative for Katie Couric responded to the book's assertion that Couric had badgered Palin during their much-publicized 2008 interview by saying, "The interview speaks for itself".

=== Reception ===
The book received a variety of reviews.

Positive reviews

Conservative radio talk show host John Ziegler praised Going Rogue as "the best book and greatest literary achievement by a political figure in my lifetime" and as showing honesty "the type of which can only come from someone incredibly courageous, grounded, and self-aware". Republican radio talk show host Rush Limbaugh called the book "truly one of the more substantive policy books I've read". Stanley Fish, writing for The New York Times Opinionator blog, explained that "while I wouldn't count myself a fan in the sense of being a supporter, I found [the book] compelling and very well done".

Mixed reviews

The Wall Street Journal's Melanie Kirkpatrick described the book as "more a personal memoir than a political one", which demonstrated that Palin "is not the prejudiced, dim-witted ideologue of the popular liberal imagination". However, Kirkpatrick criticized the book as "too gentle" on the McCain campaign staffers and McCain himself, and as spending too little time discussing political issues. Critic Michiko Kakutani, writing for The New York Times, characterized Going Rogue as "part earnest autobiography, part payback hit job", noting that it was more critical of the McCain campaign than it was of Democrats. Kakutani credited the book with doing a "lively job of conveying the frontier feel of the 49th state". Matthew Continetti of The Washington Post observed that Palin's book was "everything you'd expect from a politician who has no intention of leaving the national scene". Entertainment Weekly gave the book a C, praising the first chapters about Palin's life as "down-to-earth and funny", while concluding that the rest of the memoir was mediocre and self-serving.

Negative reviews

Mark Kennedy of the Associated Press said the book was "less the revealing autobiography of a straight-shooting maverick and more a lengthy campaign speech — more lipstick, less pit bull." Like other reviewers, Kennedy felt "Palin reserves most of her attacks for McCain's advisers." Michael Carey of the Anchorage Daily News said "there is a big something missing from Palin's narrative: the voice of a leader".

The Huffington Post described the book as "one giant complaint about the conduct of John McCain's 2008 presidential campaign". Thomas Frank, writing for The Wall Street Journal, panned the book: "This is the memoir as prolonged, keening wail, larded with petty vindictiveness". Newsweek senior editor Michael Hirsh said that "she seems to be mainly out for repudiation of her critics here, and what you see is a lot of self-involvement" and that the book would "help her with her base...I don't know if it helps at all with what she would need to actually be elected president".

== Book tour ==
Palin was interviewed in rapid succession by Oprah Winfrey, Barbara Walters, Sean Hannity, and Bill O'Reilly, with U.S. News & World Report speculating that the interviews and book tour would be "strewn with land mines". Palin began a three-week national book tour that focused on small and mid-size towns; 11 of the states she visited were considered political battlegrounds for the 2012 presidential election. Large crowds turned out to greet Palin and get their books autographed. Palin spent as long as three hours at some venues. ABC News characterized her bus book tour as "extraordinarily successful" but suggested she might be criticized for taking a private jet provided by the publisher for long legs of the journey.

In addition to the book tour, a web-based campaign directed ads for the book to people searching for Palin's name on Google. Palin also used her Facebook page to promote her book.

== Parodies ==
Going Rogue has inspired a number of parodies and satirical interpretations. Roy Edroso of the Village Voice "reviewed" the book by writing fake excerpts. TA Frank of The Guardian similarly parodied the contents with a faux first draft, complete with fake notes between Palin and her editors. Cartoonist Julie Sigwart and radio host Michael Stinson released a 48-page spoof Going Rouge: The Sarah Palin Rogue Coloring & Activity Book, on the same day that Palin's Going Rogue appeared on the shelves.

South Park featured a parody of the book in the episode Dances with Smurfs called, Going Rogue on the Smurfs.

The book Going Rouge: Sarah Palin, An American Nightmare, was a collection of essays compiled by The Nation criticizing Palin. The cover image was a parody of Palin's book, and was nearly identical. This resulted in news sources, including CNN and Fox News, confusing The Nation's book with Palin's.

== References in popular culture ==
The book and its surrounding promotion were mentioned on late night comedy shows, including the Late Show with David Letterman and Jimmy Kimmel Live! David Letterman had a recurring segment, "Things More Enjoyable than Reading the Sarah Palin Memoir", including such things as "getting run over by a lawnmower" and "driving into a tree". On December 11, 2009, William Shatner read excerpts from the book on The Tonight Show with Conan O'Brien followed by Palin reading excerpts from Shatner's autobiography, Up Till Now.

== Additional works ==
Palin published a second book, America by Heart: Reflections on Family, Faith, and Flag, in November 2010.
