= Ja'Ron Smith =

American political advisor

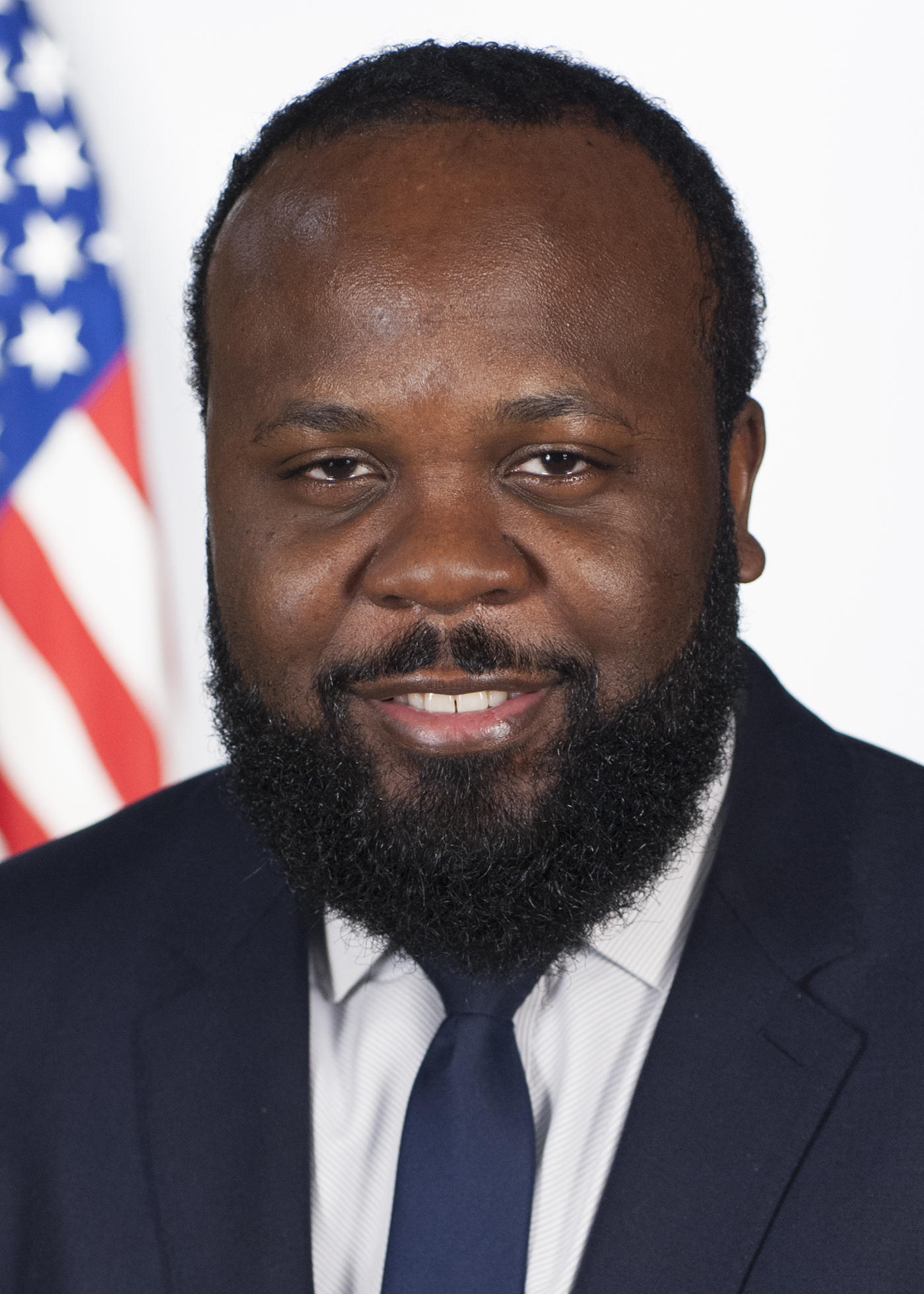

Deputy Director of the Office of American Innovation
- In office April 2019 – November 6, 2020
- President: Donald Trump
- Director: Jared Kushner
- Preceded by: Position established
- Succeeded by: Position abolished

Personal details
- Born: July 29, 1982 (age 43) Cleveland, Ohio, U.S.
- Party: Republican
- Education: Howard University (BBA, MDiv)

Ja'Ron K. Smith (born July 29, 1982) is an American political advisor. He served as a Deputy Assistant to the President and deputy director of the Office of American Innovation for Donald Trump from April 2019 to November 2020. Smith had previously served in the administration as a Special Assistant to the President for Legislative Affairs from June 2018 to April 2019 and Special Assistant to the President for Domestic Policy from February to June 2018. He also served as the director of urban affairs and revitalization from the beginning of the Trump administration in January 2017.

== Early life and education ==
Smith is a native of Cleveland, Ohio. Smith attended the Immaculate Conception School before being offered a football scholarship from St. Peter Chanel High School in Bedford, Ohio. During his high school football career, Smith was teammates with Bam Childress and Steve Cargile. Smith says he was recruited to play football by John Carroll University, but instead attended Howard University, studying Finance and Economics. Smith then earned a Master of Divinity from the Howard University Divinity School.

== Career ==
While in college, Smith worked as an intern for Congressman J. C. Watts. Smith also worked for South Carolina senator Tim Scott and then-U.S. rep. Mike Pence.

In August 2018, Smith's role in the White House was highlighted during questioning of Kellyanne Conway by Jonathan Karl on ABC's This Week regarding the number of Black people that the Trump administration has in senior roles. Smith was the highest-ranking Black aide to Trump. In November 2020, Smith left his post following the 2020 United States presidential election.

After leaving the government, Smith became a partner at corporate lobbying firm CGCN Group.
