= Kevin Gaines =

Kevin Gaines may refer to:

- Kevin Gaines (police officer) (1966–1997), Los Angeles officer who became the subject of a wrongful death lawsuit
- Kevin Gaines (gridiron football) (born 1971), American football player
- Kevin K. Gaines, American academic
