= Jared Kushner =

American businessman (born 1981)

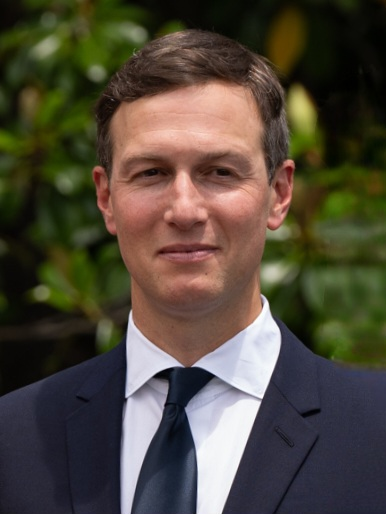
- Kushner in 2025

United States Special Envoy for Peace Missions
- Incumbent
- Assumed office February 19, 2026 Serving with Steve Witkoff
- President: Donald Trump
- Preceded by: Position established

Senior Advisor to the President
- In office January 20, 2017 – January 20, 2021
- President: Donald Trump
- Preceded by: Brian Deese; Shailagh Murray
- Succeeded by: Anita Dunn; Mike Donilon; Cedric Richmond

Director of the Office of American Innovation
- In office March 27, 2017 – January 20, 2021 Serving with Brooke Rollins (2018–2020)
- President: Donald Trump
- Deputy: Ja'Ron Smith
- Preceded by: Position established
- Succeeded by: Position abolished

Member of the Indian Creek Village Council
- Incumbent
- Assumed office July 8, 2024
- Preceded by: Javier Holtz

Personal details
- Born: Jared Corey Kushner; January 10, 1981 (age 45) Livingston, New Jersey, U.S.
- Party: Republican (2018–present)
- Other political affiliations: Democratic (1999–2009); Independent (2009–2018)
- Spouse: Ivanka Trump (m. 2009)
- Children: 3
- Parent: Charles Kushner (father)
- Relatives: Kushner family; Trump family (by marriage)
- Education: Harvard University (BA); New York University (JD, MBA)
- Occupation: Businessman; investor
- Awards: Order of the Aztec Eagle (2018); Order of Ouissam Alaouite (2021); Hungarian Order of Merit (2022)

Jared Corey Kushner (born January 10, 1981) is an American businessman, investor, government official and politician. Through his marriage to Ivanka Trump, he is the son-in-law of the 45th and 47th president of the United States Donald Trump. Kushner has served in both official and informal roles in the first and second Trump administrations.

Kushner worked as a real-estate investor in New York City, especially through the family business Kushner Companies. He took over the company in 2005 after his father, Charles Kushner, was convicted on criminal charges. Jared met Trump's daughter, Ivanka around 2005, and the couple married in 2009. He also became involved in the newspaper industry after purchasing The New York Observer in 2006. He was registered as a Democrat and donated to Democratic politicians until he registered as Independent in 2009 and eventually as Republican in 2018. He played a significant role in the Donald Trump 2016 presidential campaign, and was at one point seen as its de facto campaign manager. Around Trump's election, Kushner was frequently accused of conflicts of interest, profiting from policy proposals for which he personally advocated within the first Trump administration.

In 2017, Kushner was appointed as a senior advisor to Trump and as director of the Office of American Innovation, and held both positions until Trump left office in 2021. His appointment was followed by concerns of nepotism. He led the administration's effort to pass the First Step Act, a criminal justice reform bill signed into law in 2018. Kushner was the primary Trump administration participant for the Middle East Peace Process, authoring the Trump peace plan and facilitating the talks that led to the signing of the Abraham Accords and other normalization agreements between Israel and various Arab states in 2020. Kushner also played an influential role in the Trump administration's COVID-19 response, where he advised Trump that the media was exaggerating the threat of the disease. He was a leading broker in the United States–Mexico–Canada Agreement.

After leaving the White House in 2021, Kushner founded Affinity Partners, a private equity firm that derives most of its funds from the Public Investment Fund, the Saudi government's sovereign wealth fund.

Kushner returned to an informal advisory role in the second Trump administration in 2025, serving along with Steve Witkoff as a key intermediary in diplomatic negotiations regarding the Gaza war and the Russian invasion of Ukraine. In 2026, he was officially appointed as a special envoy for peace.

== Early life and education ==
Jared Corey Kushner was born on January 10, 1981, in Livingston, New Jersey, to Seryl (née Stadtmauer) and Charles Kushner. His father was friends with Bill and Hillary Clinton and attended several dinners with them. Morris Stadtmauer was Jared's maternal grandfather. His paternal grandparents, Reichel and Joseph Kushner, were Holocaust survivors who came to the U.S. in 1949 from Navahrudak, now in Belarus. Reichel, described as the family's matriarch, led efforts during the Holocaust to escape from the Navahrudak ghetto by digging a tunnel. Later, she became a member of the Bielski partisans.

Raised in a Modern Orthodox Jewish family, Kushner graduated from the Frisch School, a Modern Orthodox yeshiva high school, in 1999 and enrolled at Harvard University in the same year. According to journalist Daniel Golden, Kushner's father made a donation of $2.5 million to the university in 1998, not long before Jared was admitted. At Harvard, Kushner was elected into the Fly Club, supported the campus Chabad house led by Hirschy Zarchi, and bought and sold real estate in Somerville, Massachusetts, as a vice president of Somerville Building Associates (a division of Kushner Companies), returning a profit of $20 million by its dissolution in 2005. Kushner graduated from Harvard with honors in 2003, with a B.A. degree in government.

Kushner then enrolled in the JD/MBA dual degree program at the New York University School of Law and New York University Stern School of Business, and graduated with both degrees in 2007. He interned at Manhattan district attorney Robert Morgenthau's office, and with the New York law firm Paul, Weiss, Rifkind, Wharton & Garrison.

== Business career ==
Following his father's conviction in 2005 for 18 criminal charges including illegal campaign contributions, tax evasion, and witness tampering and subsequent incarceration between March 4, 2005, and August 25, 2006, Kushner took a much bigger role in the family real estate business. He set about expanding the business and acquired almost $7 billion in property over the next ten years, much of it in New York City.

=== Real estate ===
Kushner was an active real estate investor during his college years, and increased the Kushner Companies' presence throughout the New York City real estate market.

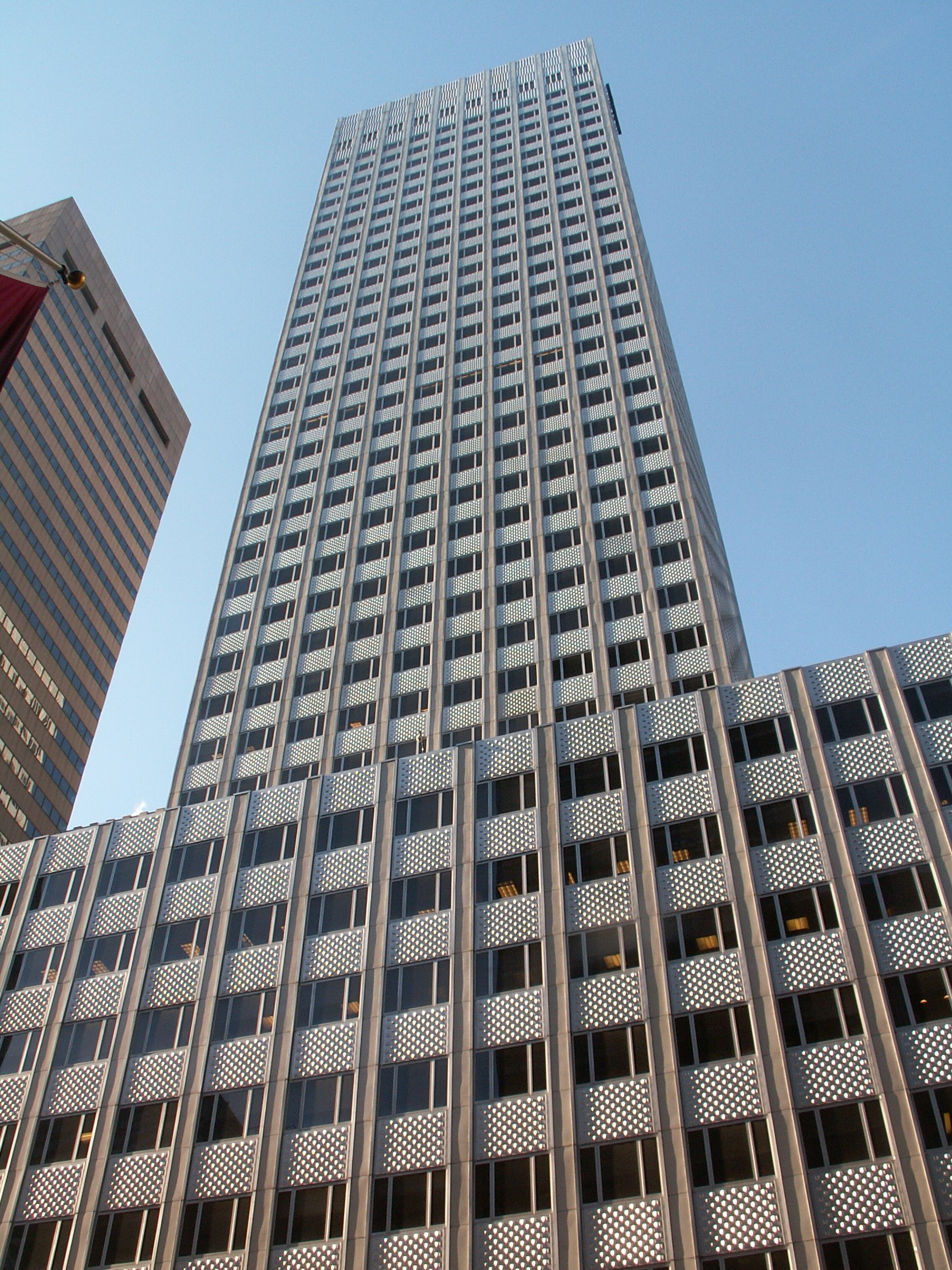
Kushner Companies purchased 666 Fifth Avenue in 2007 for $1.8 billion, the most expensive single property purchase in US history at the time.

Kushner Companies purchased the office building at 666 Fifth Avenue in 2007, for a then-record price of $1.8 billion, most of it borrowed. He assumed the role of CEO in 2008. Following the property crash that year, the cash flow generated by the property was insufficient to cover its debt service, and the Kushners were forced to sell a controlling stake in the retail footage to the Carlyle Group and Stanley Chera and bring in Vornado Realty Trust as a 50% equity partner in the ownership of the building. By that time, Kushner Companies had lost more than $90 million on its investment. He was the face of the deal, but his father Charles Kushner pushed him to do the deal.

In 2011, Kushner purchased a 130,000-square-foot office tower at 200 Lafayette Street in Manhattan for $50 million, selling it two years later for $150 million. In 2013, his company led a transaction to purchase the Jehovah's Witnesses headquarters in Brooklyn Heights for $375 million and invested $100 million into the site, transforming it into a sprawling office park, and signing online retailer Etsy to a 10-year lease. The same year, Kushner co-founded WiredScore, a global organization that provides a digital connectivity certification rating the quality and resilience of digital infrastructure in buildings.

Throughout 2013 to 2014, Kushner and his company acquired more than 11,000 units throughout New York, New Jersey, and the Baltimore area. In August 2014, Kushner acquired a three-building apartment portfolio in Middle River, Maryland, for $38 million with Aion Partners, later selling the complex for $68 million. In May 2015, he acquired a 50.1% stake of the Times Square Building from Africa Israel Investments Ltd. for $295 million.

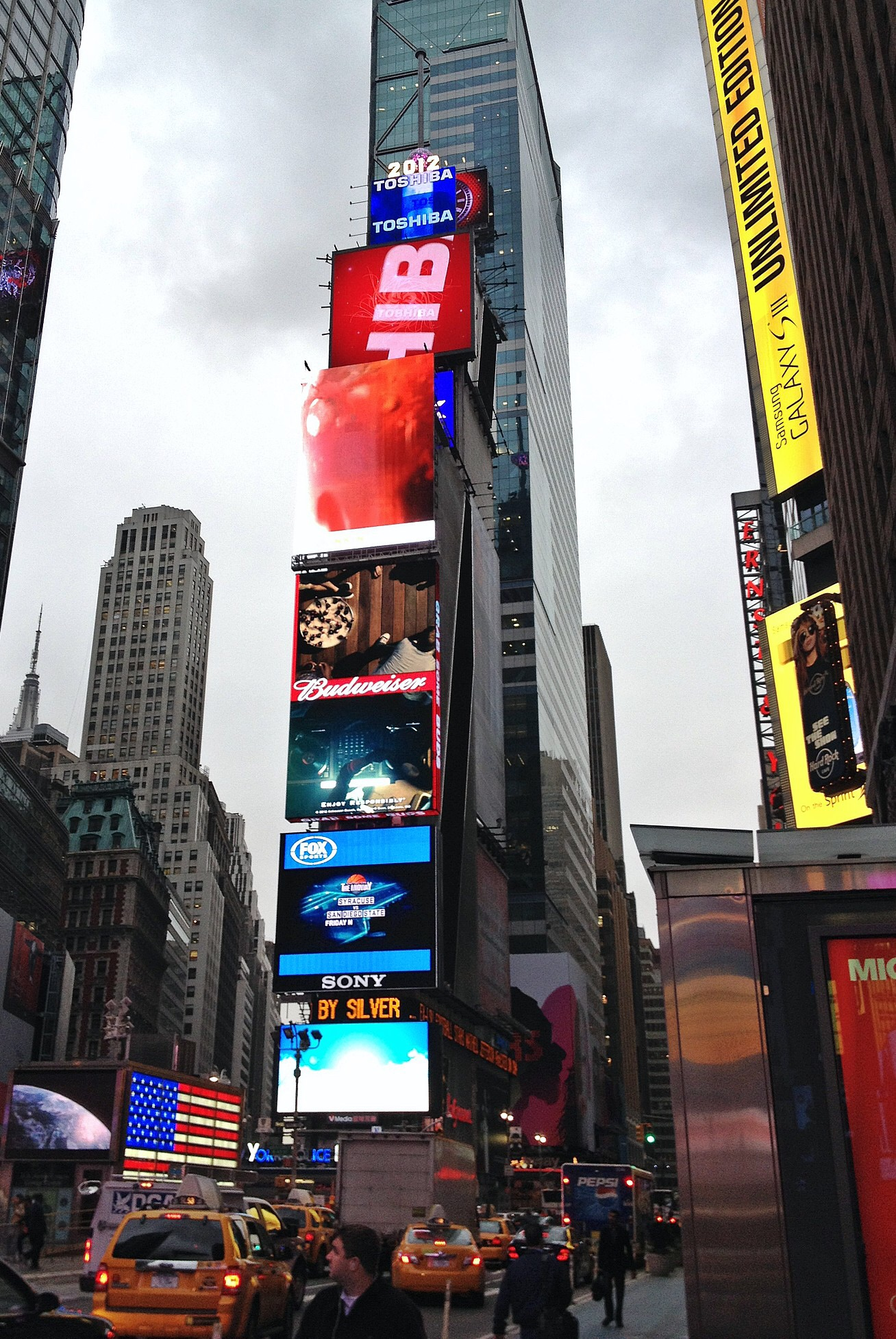
In May 2015, Kushner purchased a majority stake of One Times Square for $295 million.

In 2014, Kushner, with his brother Joshua and Ryan Williams, co-founded Cadre (now RealCadre LLC), an online real-estate investment platform. His business partners included Goldman Sachs and billionaire George Soros, a top Democratic Party donor. In early 2015, Soros Fund Management financed the startup with a $250 million credit line. Kushner did not identify these business relationships in his January 2017 government financial-disclosure form. He did, however, disclose his ownership of BFPS Ventures, the company that housed his stake in Cadre. In 2019, a property management company owned by Kushner was sued alleging that the company charged tenants illegal fees and failed to maintain over 9,000 properties in Maryland; the company settled and paid a $3.25 million civil penalty and restitution in 2022. In 2020, his ownership stake in Cadre was estimated at $25–50 million.

=== Newspaper publishing ===
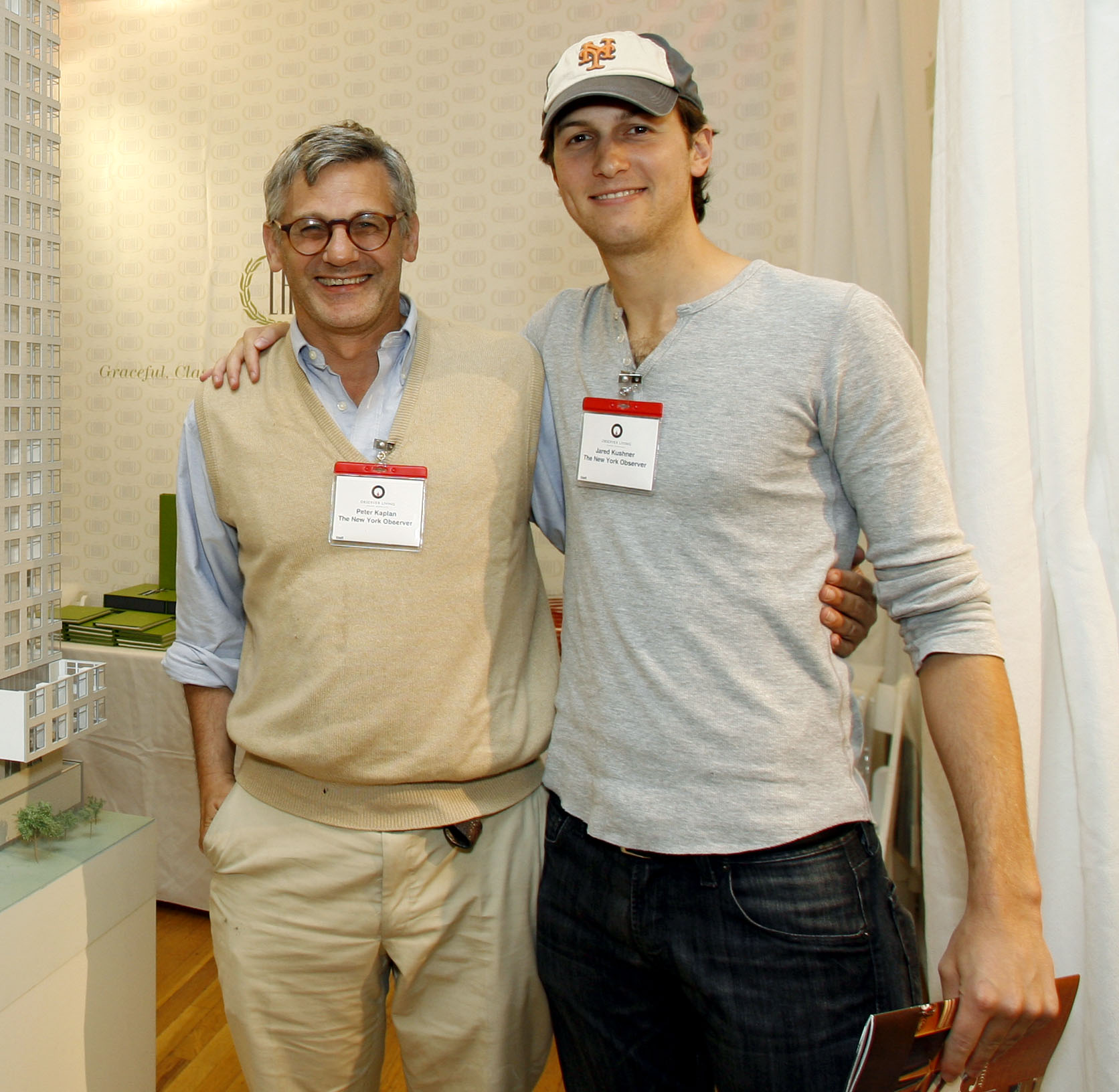
Kushner (right) with The New York Observer's then editor-in-chief Peter W. Kaplan, September 2008

In 2006, Kushner purchased The New York Observer, a weekly New York City newspaper, for $10 million, outcompeting a bid by Trifecta Enterprises, a group headed by Robert De Niro. To make the bid, Kushner used money he says he earned during his college years by closing deals on residential buildings he purchased in Somerville, Massachusetts, with family members providing the backing for his investments. The buildings, which he purchased for $8.3 million in 2000, sold four years later for $13 million.

After purchasing the Observer, Kushner published it in tabloid format. Since then, he has been credited with increasing the Observer's online presence and expanding the Observer Media Group. With no substantial experience in journalism, Kushner could not establish a good relationship with the newspaper's veteran editor-in-chief, Peter W. Kaplan. "This guy doesn't know what he doesn't know", Kaplan remarked about Kushner, to colleagues, at the time. As a result of his differences with Kushner, Kaplan quit his position. Kaplan was followed by a series of short-lived successors until Kushner hired Elizabeth Spiers in 2011. It has been alleged that Kushner used the Observer as propaganda against rivals in real estate. Spiers left the newspaper in 2012. In January 2013, Kushner hired a new editor-in-chief, Ken Kurson. Kurson had been a consultant to Republican political candidates in New Jersey.

According to Vanity Fair, under Kushner, the "Observer has lost virtually all of its cultural currency among New York's elite, but the paper is now profitable and reporting traffic growth ... [it] boasts 6 million unique visitors per month, up from 1.3 million in January 2013". In April 2016, the New York Observer became one of only a handful of newspapers to officially endorse United States presidential candidate Donald Trump in the Republican primary, but the paper ended the campaign period by choosing not to back any presidential candidate at all.

Kushner stepped down from his newspaper role in January 2017 to pursue a role in President Donald Trump's administration. He was replaced by his brother-in-law, Joseph Meyer.

== Politics ==
=== Political background ===
Jared Kushner had been a lifelong Democrat prior to his father-in-law Donald Trump entering politics. He had donated over $10,000 to Democratic campaigns starting at the age of 11. In 2008, he donated to the campaign for Hillary Clinton and his newspaper the New York Observer endorsed Barack Obama over John McCain in the 2008 United States presidential election. After expressing disappointment with Obama, however, he registered as an independent in 2009 and endorsed Republican U.S. presidential nominee Mitt Romney in 2012 via the New York Observer. In 2014 he continued to donate to Democratic groups, but joined his father-in-law Donald Trump's nascent US presidential campaign in the field of the Republican candidates in 2015. Kushner had no prior involvement in campaign politics or in government before Trump's campaign.

=== Presidential campaign ===
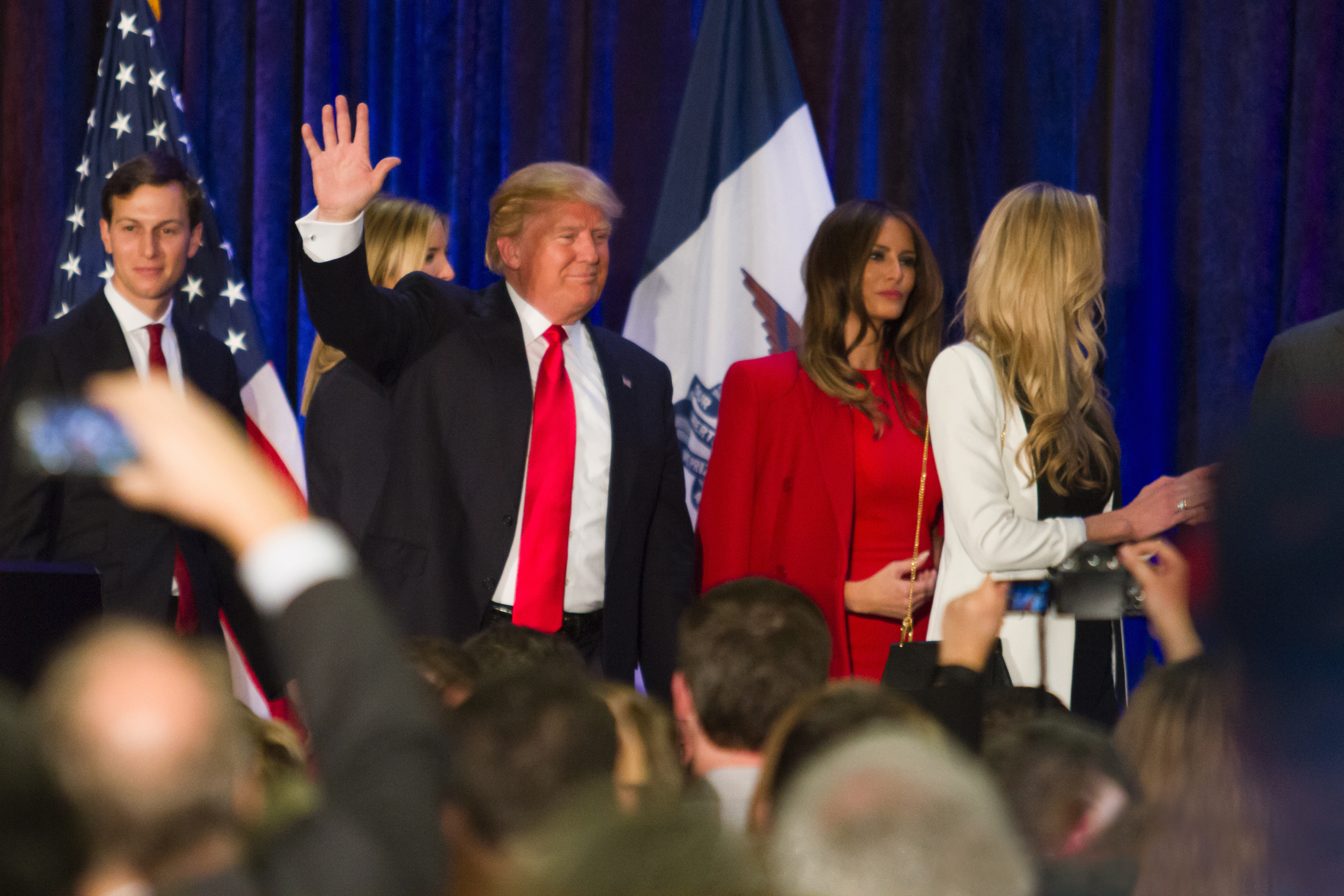
Kushner and the Trump family, pictured at a campaign victory party in Des Moines, Iowa, on February 1, 2016

From the outset of the presidential campaign of his father-in-law Donald Trump, Kushner was the architect of Trump's digital, online, and social media campaigns, enlisting talent from Silicon Valley to run a 100-person social-media team dubbed "Project Alamo." The digital team tested more than one hundred thousand ad combinations a week, raising more than $250 million in small-dollar donations in the closing months of the campaign. Andrew Bosworth, Facebook's top advertising executive during the 2016 campaign cycle, called it the "single best digital ad campaign I've ever seen from any advertiser."

Kushner, together with Paul Manafort and Brad Parscale, hired Steve Bannon's firm Cambridge Analytica to support the Trump campaign. Kushner has also helped as a speechwriter, and was tasked with working to establish a plan for Trump's White House transition team. He was for a time seen as Trump's de facto campaign manager, succeeding Corey Lewandowski, who was fired in part on Kushner's recommendation in June 2016. He had been intimately involved with campaign strategy, coordinating Trump's visit in late August to Mexico, and he is believed to be responsible for the choice of Mike Pence as Trump's running mate. Kushner's "sprawling digital fundraising database and social media campaign" has been described as "the locus of his father-in-law's presidential bid."

According to former Google CEO Eric Schmidt (who worked on technology for Hillary Clinton's campaign), Kushner's role in the 2016 election was its biggest surprise. Schmidt told Forbes, "Best I can tell, he actually ran the campaign and did it with essentially no resources." Federal Election Commission filings indicate the Trump campaign spent $343 million, about 59 percent as much as the Clinton campaign.

On July 5, 2016, Kushner wrote an open letter in the New York Observer addressing the controversy around a tweet from the Trump campaign containing allegedly anti-Semitic imagery. He was responding to his own paper's editorial by Dana Schwartz criticizing Kushner's involvement with the Trump campaign. In the letter, Kushner wrote, "In my opinion, accusations like 'racist' and 'anti-Semite' are being thrown around with a carelessness that risks rendering these words meaningless." His estranged cousin Marc responded to the op-ed on Facebook that his lesson from the story of his grandparents was to renounce hate.

=== Presidential transition ===
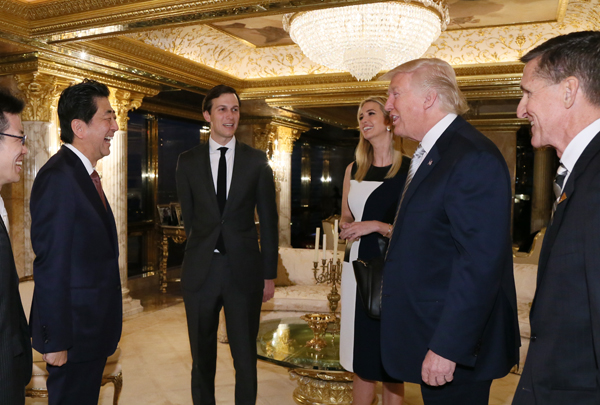
Japanese PM Shinzō Abe meets with Ivanka, president-elect Donald Trump, and Jared Kushner, November 2016

During the presidential transition, Kushner was said to be his father-in-law's "confidant," and one of Donald Trump's closest advisors, even more so than Trump's four adult children. Trump was reported to have requested the top-secret security clearance for him to attend the presidential daily intelligence briefings as his staff-level companion, along with General Mike Flynn, who already had the clearance prior to his resignation.

=== Senior Advisor to the President ===
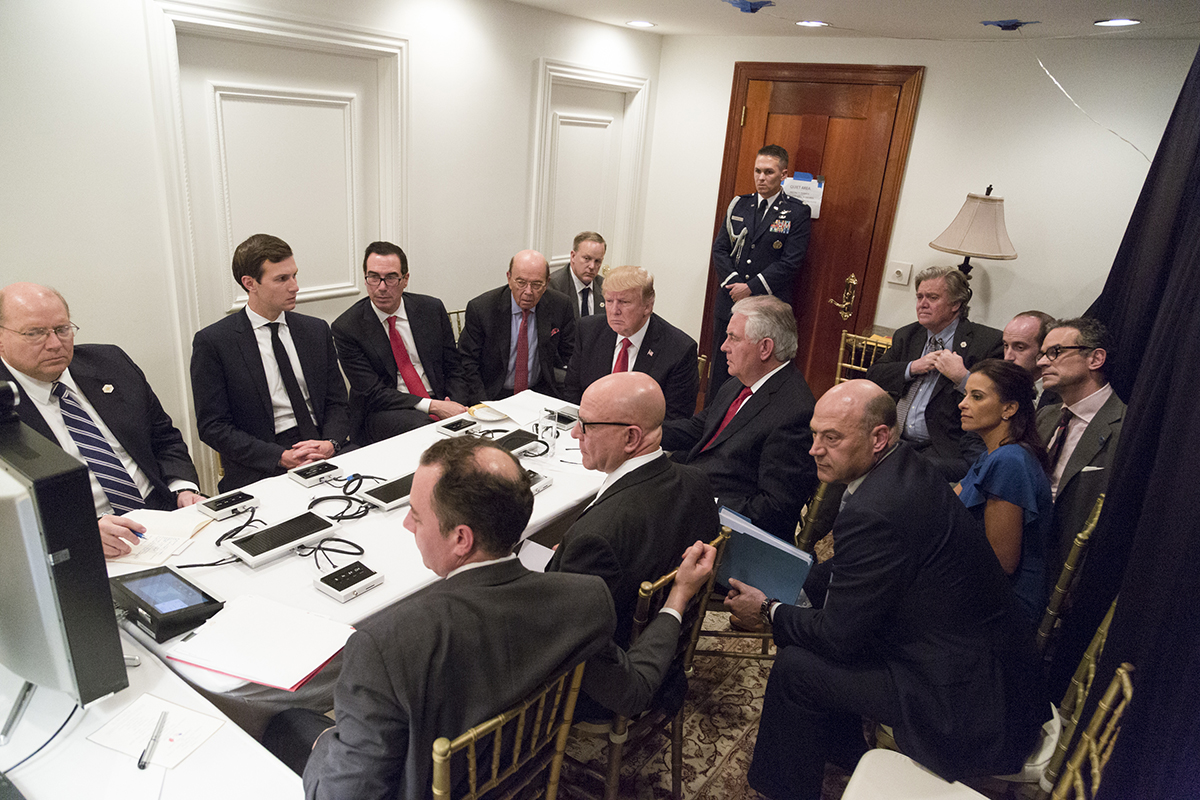
Kushner during the April 2017 Syrian missile strike operation

On January 9, 2017, Kushner was named Senior Advisor to the President (formally, "Assistant to the President and Senior Advisor"). He consequently resigned as CEO of Kushner Companies, and as publisher of the Observer.

After Donald Trump became President-elect, Kushner and his wife Ivanka Trump met with the Japanese prime minister and other Japanese officials, while Ivanka was conducting a licensing deal between her namesake clothing brand and Sanei International, a company whose investors include the Japanese government's development bank. Although negotiations around the deal had begun in 2015, well before Donald Trump secured the Republican nomination for president, Ivanka backed out of the deal to avoid the appearance of a conflict of interest. She had sat in on a meeting between her father, then-president-elect Donald Trump, and Japan's prime minister, Shinzo Abe.

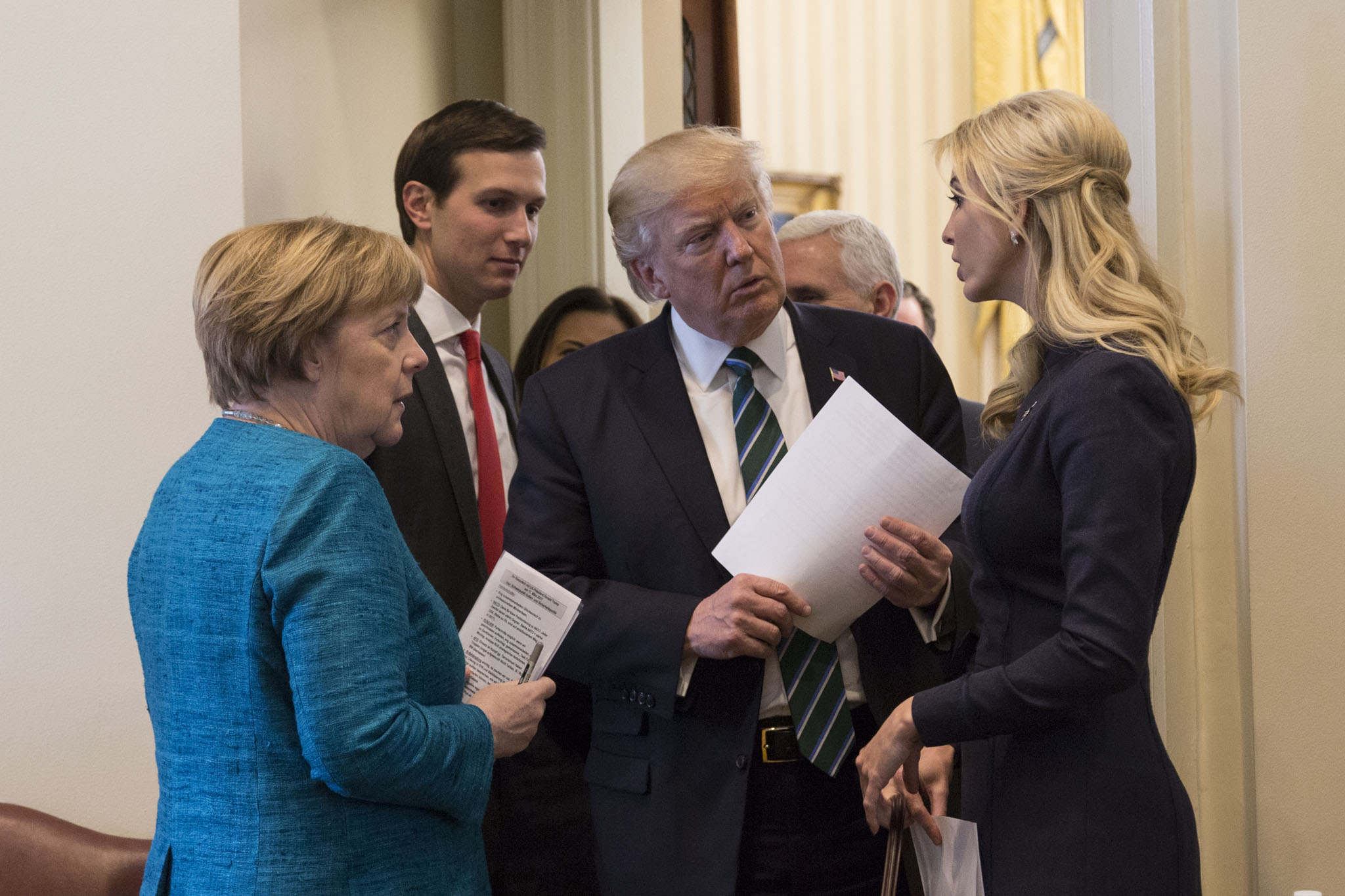
Kushner with President Trump and German Chancellor Angela Merkel in March 2017

Kushner helped broker the sale of $100+ billion of arms to Saudi Arabia, and during a meeting with Saudi officials at the White House to finalize the deal, he called Lockheed Martin CEO Marillyn Hewson to ask for a lower price on a radar system to detect ballistic missiles.

Kushner's business activities in China drew press scrutiny for mixing government with business. Kushner's investments in real estate and financial services have also drawn controversy for conflicts of interest. In May 2017, the Wall Street Journal reported that he had failed to disclose all required financial information in his security clearance applications, including that he owed $1 billion in loans. While noting that “it is difficult to calculate net worth” using financial disclosure forms, The Washington Post estimated that during 2017, Kushner and his wife Ivanka Trump made $82 million in outside income at the same time that they served as senior White House advisors. Kushner and Ivanka's lawyers asserted that their net worth had largely remained the same.

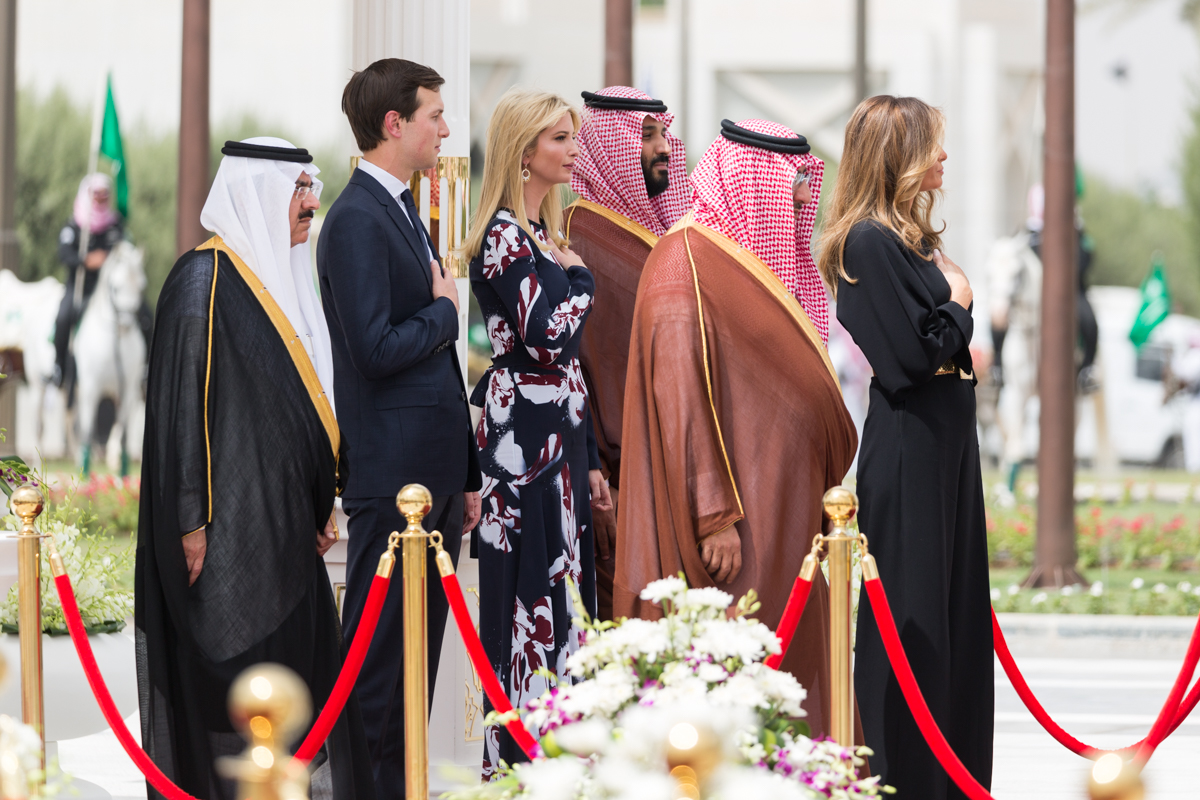
Kushner and Ivanka Trump with Saudi Crown Prince Muhammad bin Nayef, Deputy Crown Prince Mohammad bin Salman, King Salman of Saudi Arabia, and Melania Trump, Riyadh, May 2017

In June 2017, Saudi Arabia and the UAE had implemented a naval blockade on Qatar, accusing them of aiding terrorist groups, and reportedly planned to invade Qatar. During the dispute, Jared had backed the Saudis and Emiratis in the conflict, undermined efforts by then Secretary of State Rex Tillerson to stop the blockade and to bring the conflict to a peaceful outcome, and pressured President Trump to back the Emiratis and Saudis in the dispute, which the President did, according to The New York Times.

In a statement, Abbe Lowell, Kushner's lawyer, admitted that Kushner had intermittently used private e-mail for official White House business. No classified or privileged information was used on this account. During the campaign for the 2016 presidential election, Trump repeatedly criticized his opponent Hillary Clinton for her use of personal e-mail in her role as Secretary of State, which involved the transmission of classified information over a server Clinton had set up in her basement.

In an HBO/Axios interview released in June 2019, Kushner denied that President Trump was a racist. When asked whether birther conspiracy theories about President Obama (which Trump pushed extensively for a number of years) were racist, Kushner did not answer, saying instead twice, "Look, I wasn't really involved in that." In the interview, Kushner, whose grandparents survived the holocaust and later immigrated to America, spoke of his own family's immigration history: "It's a great reminder of how great this country is." In the same interview, he defended the Trump administration's decision to drastically reduce the number of refugees accepted by the United States (the lowest level in 40 years).

In March 2020, the Associated Press reported that Kushner had sold stakes in a firm that had benefitted from the same Opportunity Zone tax breaks—incentives for new investment in low-income communities—that Kushner pushed for as a senior White House advisor.

==== Office of American Innovation ====
From 2017 until the end of the first Trump administration in January 2021, Kushner directed the Office of American Innovation. The office, created by President Trump in March 2017, was to draw on the lessons of the private sector to solving problems in government, such as the federal government's IT spend, economic activity, and the opioid crisis.

==== Firing of Chris Christie ====
Kushner was reportedly an influential factor behind the firing of New Jersey governor Chris Christie as head of the transition team, as well as the dismissal from the Donald Trump transition team of anyone connected to Christie. An anonymous source familiar with the transition told Politico, "Jared doesn't like Christie... He's always held [the prosecution of his father] against Christie." Kushner told Forbes that the reports that he was involved in Christie's dismissal were false: "Six months ago, Governor Christie and I decided this election was much bigger than any differences we may have had in the past, and we worked very well together. ... I was not behind pushing out him or his people." In his memoir Christie said that Steve Bannon fired him at Trump Tower but that Kushner had his firing ordered as revenge for what Christie had done to Kushner's father Charles Kushner for several felonies.

==== Russia investigation ====
Kushner's contacts with Russian officials came under scrutiny as part of the larger federal investigation into Russian interference in the election. Before meeting with the Senate and House intelligence committees, Kushner delivered an 11-page document describing his contacts with Russian figures during the campaign and after the election. The Wall Street Journal called it "comprehensive disclosure" and said it "introduced a useful precedent to the Trump presidency"

Kushner has said he had four meetings with Russians during the 2016 campaign and presidential transition, and that none of those Russian contacts were improper.

In June 2016, an agent of Emin Agalarov reportedly offered Donald Trump Jr., Kushner's brother-in-law, compromising information on Hillary Clinton from the Russian government if he met with a lawyer connected to the Kremlin. A meeting took place on June 9, 2016, and included Kushner, Trump Jr., and Paul Manafort, who was then chairman of the presidential campaign, who met with Natalia Veselnitskaya at Trump Tower. According to Rinat Akhmetshin, who was also present at the meeting, Veselnitskaya claimed to have evidence of "violations of Russian law by a Democratic donor", and that the "Russian lawyer described her findings at the meeting and left a document about them with Trump Jr. and the others". According to the Mueller Report, Kushner arrived at the meeting and quickly grew aggravated, texting Paul Manafort that it was a “waste of time,” and emailing two different assistants to call him so he would have an excuse to leave the meeting. Investigators did not identify any follow up from the meeting. The Democratic National Committee cyber attacks were revealed later that week.

Between April and November 2016, Kushner had two undisclosed phone calls with the Russian ambassador, Sergey I. Kislyak. (In May 2017, Kushner's attorney Jamie Gorelick told Reuters that Kushner had participated in "thousands of calls in this time period" and did not recall any with Kislyak.) In December 2016, Kushner met with Kislyak. That month, U.S. intelligence officials who were monitoring Kislyak reportedly overheard him relaying to Moscow a request from Kushner to establish a "secret and secure communications channel" with the Kremlin using Russian diplomatic facilities. Kislyak reportedly was "taken aback by the suggestion of allowing an American to use Russian communications gear at its embassy or consulate – a proposal that would have carried security risks for Moscow as well as the Trump team".

Also in December 2016, Kushner met with Sergei Gorkov, a trained Russian spy who then headed Vnesheconombank (VEB), a Russian state-owned bank. Former White House press secretary Sean Spicer said that Kushner met with Gorkov briefly as part of his role in the transition, and as a diplomatic conduit to the State Department. However, VEB has stated that Gorkov met with Kushner on a private matter concerning his family's real estate corporation, Kushner Companies, even though VEB has been under international sanctions since July 2014. The Mueller investigation examined this meeting and could not confirm VEB's account. The Mueller report did state, however, that it was unable to find evidence that there was any follow up between Kushner and Gorkov after the meeting.

In July 2017, Kushner appeared before both the House and Senate intelligence committees in closed session as part of their investigations into Russian meddling in the 2016 election. He also released a public statement. In October 2017, the Senate Judiciary Committee requested numerous documents from Kushner. Kushner's attorneys gave the committee many documents on November 3, but the committee followed up on November 16 with a request for many additional documents it said had not been produced.

In early November 2017, Kushner was interviewed by investigators from Special Counsel Robert Mueller's office. Reportedly the interview focused on former national security advisor Michael Flynn. On December 1, Flynn pleaded guilty to one count of lying to the FBI, as part of a plea bargain. Bloomberg reported that Kushner is most likely the "senior member of the Trump transition team," mentioned in Flynn's plea documents, who is said to have ordered Flynn to contact Russia.

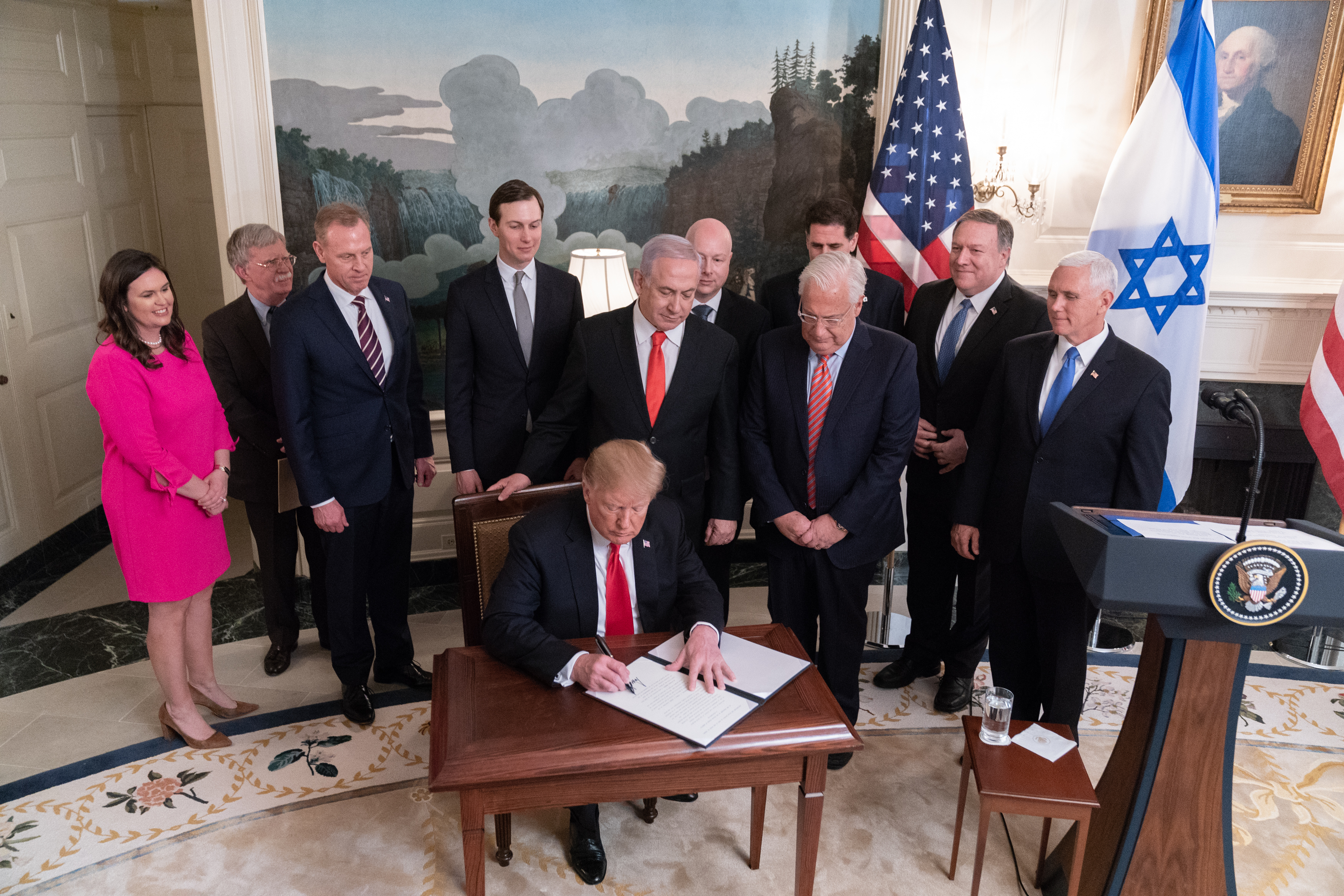
President Trump, joined by Kushner and Netanyahu behind, signs the proclamation recognizing Israel's 1981 annexation of the Golan Heights, March 2019

Mueller investigated meetings between Trump associates including Kushner and George Nader, an emissary representing the crown princes of the United Arab Emirates (UAE) and Saudi Arabia. In August 2016, Nader offered help to the Trump presidential campaign. In December 2016, Nader attended a New York meeting between the United Arab Emirates officials and Kushner, Michael Flynn and Steve Bannon. Mueller also investigated Kushner's possible ties to Qatar, Israel and China. Two months after the Mueller report was released, Kushner's top secret security clearance was permanently restored.

Since the electoral defeat of his father-in-law, Donald J. Trump, Kushner has stayed active in the region through a nonprofit organization he established. He took a special interest in the petroleum-rich monarchies of the Persian Gulf. Kushner attempted to raise money from the Persian Gulf states for a new investment firm he has founded.

The transcript of Kushner's interview with FBI investigators was not publicly released in January 2020 as ordered by a federal judge, as the Justice Department stated it required a security review by an unnamed intelligence agency. The transcript was released on February 3, redacted nearly in its entirety.

In June 2019, Republicans and Democrats on the Senate Intelligence Community made a criminal referral of Kushner to federal prosecutors on concerns that his testimony was contradicted by Richard Gates, a former Trump campaign aides, although the referral did not accuse Kushner of making false statements.

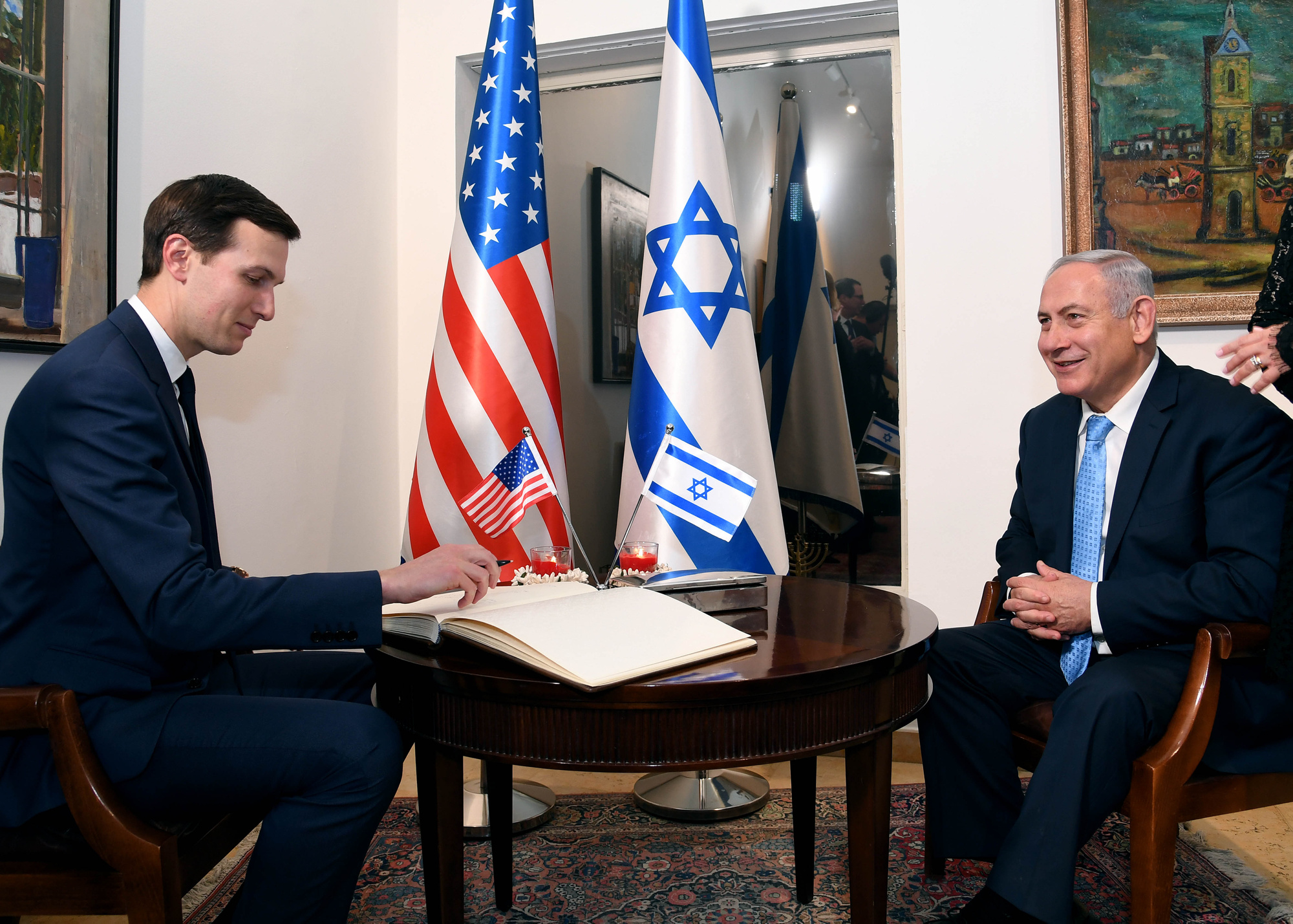
Dedication ceremony of the Embassy of the United States in Jerusalem, May 2018

==== Criminal justice reform — FIRST STEP Act ====
Kushner was a strong supporter within the first Trump administration for the bipartisan criminal justice reform bill Formerly Incarcerated Reenter Society Transformed Safely Transitioning Every Person Act (FIRST STEP ACT, H.R. 5682) which President Trump signed into law in December 2018. The legislation implemented several reforms to America's prison and criminal justice systems, reducing sentences for certain non-violent offenders and improving prison programs to reduce recidivism, among other priorities. In announcing his support for the bill, Trump argued that it would “make our communities safer and give former inmates a second chance at life. According to reporting by Axios in 2020, Trump expressed regrets in private about having followed Jared Kushner's lead in going through with the First Step Act.

==== Middle East peace plan and Abraham Accords ====
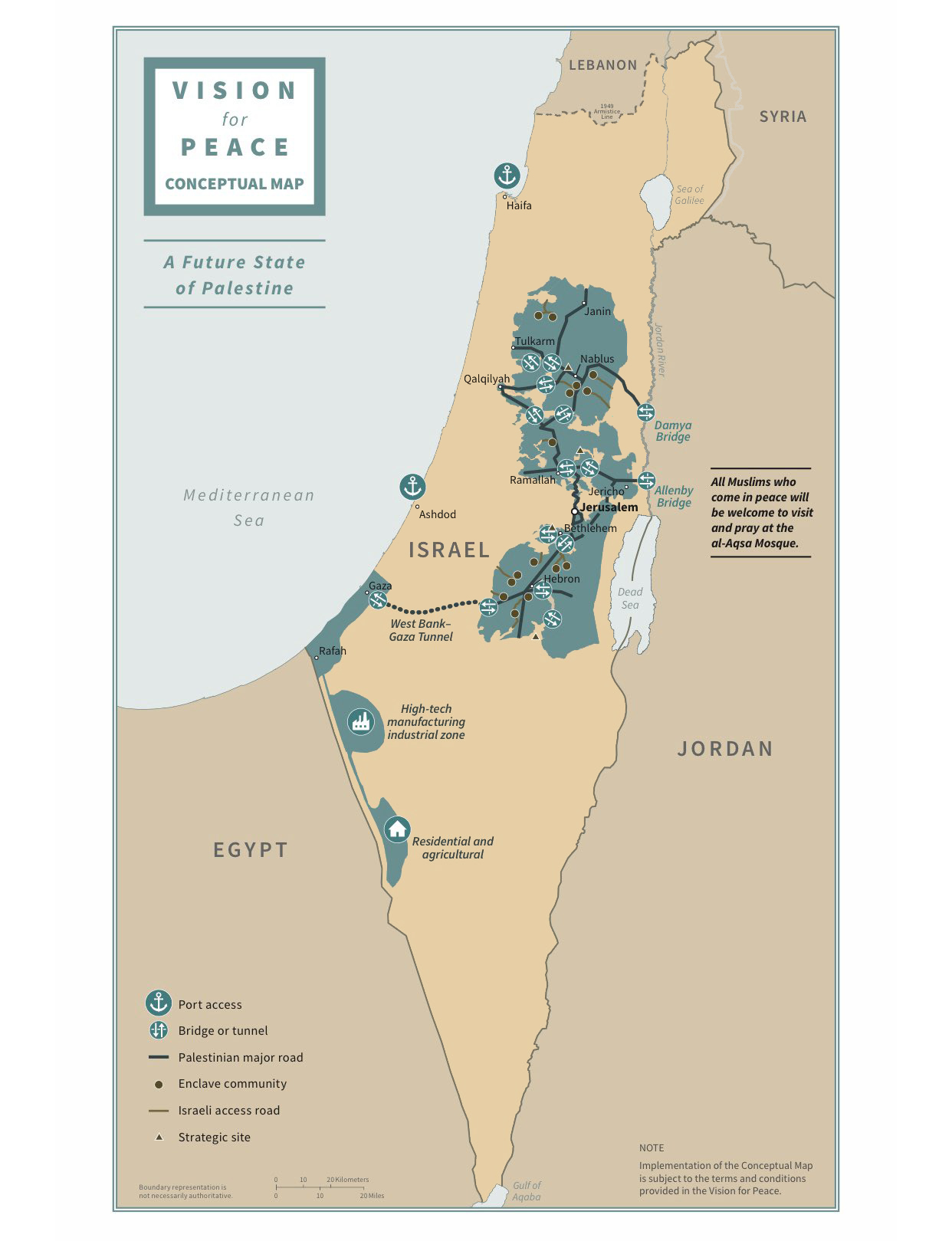
Kushner is said to be the main architect of Trump's Israeli–Palestinian peace plan.

Trump put Kushner in charge of brokering peace in the Israeli–Palestinian conflict, despite the fact that Kushner had no foreign experience or experience in the Middle East. On August 24, 2017, Kushner traveled to Israel to talk to Prime Minister Benjamin Netanyahu (with whom Kushner has longstanding personal links and family ties, causing Palestinians to distrust him). He then traveled to Palestine to meet President Mahmoud Abbas in an attempt to restart a peace process in the Middle East.

Donald Trump formally unveiled a plan authored by Kushner in a White House press conference alongside Israeli prime minister Benjamin Netanyahu on January 28, 2020; while representatives from the United Arab Emirates, Bahrain, and Oman attended the event. Palestinian representatives were not invited. In an interview, Kushner said he had "been studying this now for three years", and that he had "read 25 books on it, I've spoken to every leader in the region, I've spoken to everyone who's been involved in this." The plan, which was endorsed by the Israeli government, offered the Palestinians a conditional path to an independent state with defined borders. It has been characterized as requiring too few concessions from the Israelis and imposing too harsh requirements on the Palestinians. Both the West Bank settlers' Yesha Council and the Palestinian leadership rejected the plan: the former because it proposed a path to a Palestinian state, the latter arguing it is too biased in favor of Israel. Reaction was muted among the Arab states, although Saudi Arabia, the UAE, Qatar, Bahrain, Egypt, Lebanon issued statements expressing appreciation for the effort. The proposal gave American approval for Israel to annex its settlements in the West Bank, contingent on Israel and the United States agreeing to a concrete map for the contested areas within the West Bank and Jerusalem.

After Yousef Al Otaiba, the UAE ambassador to the United States, wrote a June 2020 opinion piece warning that annexation of Israeli settlements in the occupied West Bank would threaten better relations between Israel and the Arab world, Kushner saw an opportunity and stepped in to facilitate talks. The talks led to the August establishment of diplomatic ties between the United Arab Emirates and Israel, normalizing what had long been informal relations between the two countries and ultimately becoming the first Abraham Accord, which was the first normalization agreement between Israel and an Arab country since it normalized relations with Jordan in 1994. As part of the agreement, Netanyahu suspended the annexation of West Bank settlements, which the Kushner peace plan had approved months earlier. The first commercial flight from Israel to the UAE later arrived in Abu Dhabi with a U.S.-Israeli delegation led by Kushner.

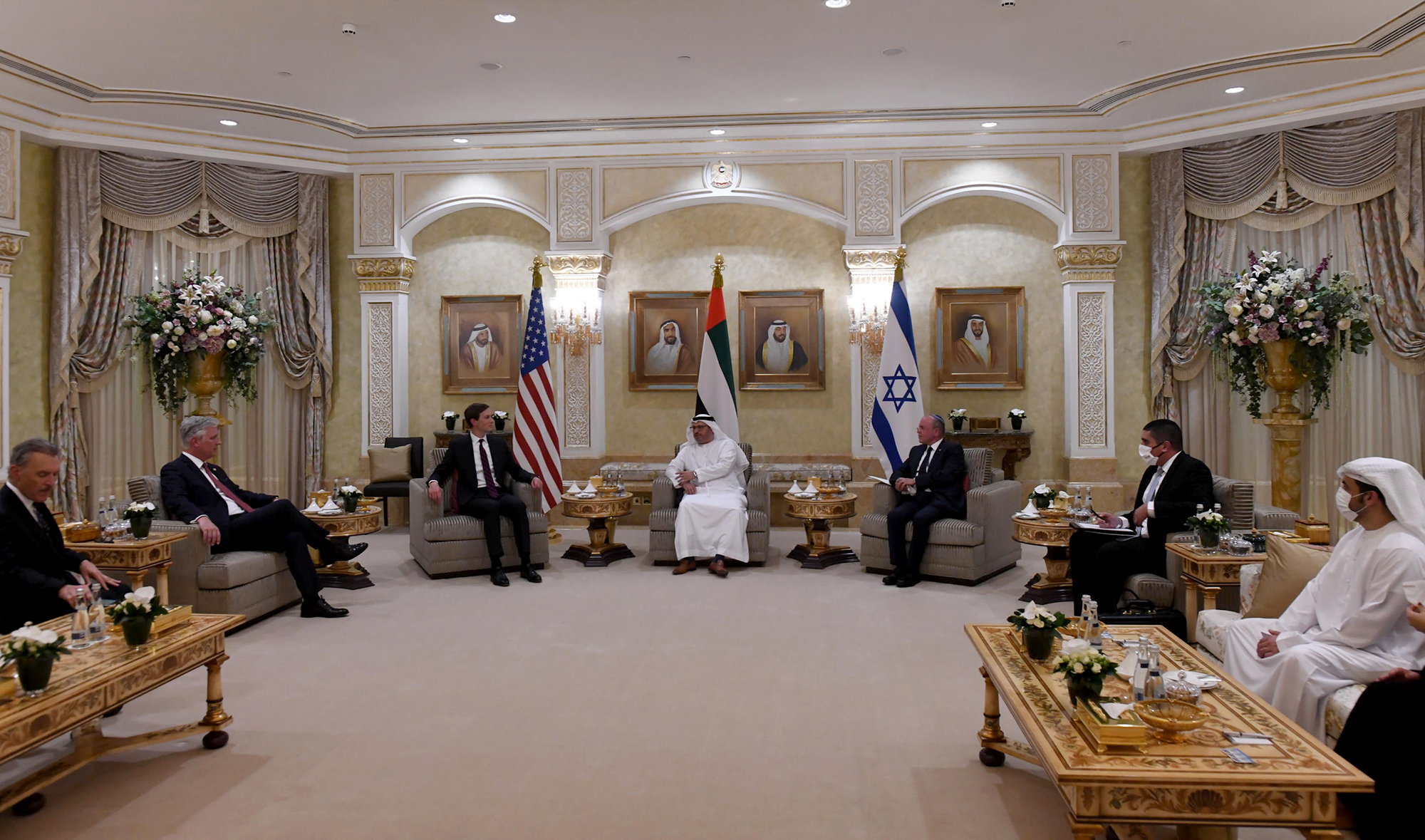
Emirati Minister of State for Foreign Affairs Anwar Gargash (center) meets with Jared Kushner and Head of Israel's National Security Council Meir Ben-Shabbat in Abu Dhabi, August 31, 2020

Hours after the August 13 announcement of the U.S.-brokered normalization agreements between Israel and the United Arab Emirates, senior Bahraini officials called Kushner with a message: "We want to be next". Over the next 29 days Kushner and aide Avi Berkowitz negotiated, and traveled to Bahrain, before closing the deal on September 11, 2020, in a call between Trump, Netanyahu and the king of Bahrain.

All three countries officially committed to the deals on September 15, 2020, with the signing of the Abraham Accords on the South Lawn of the White House.

On September 4, 2020, Kosovo, a Muslim-majority country, announced that it intended to normalize relations with Israel as part of an economic agreement the United States had brokered between it and Serbia. The negotiations were led by Ric Grenell, special envoy for Serbia and Kosovo peace negotiations, with support from Kushner.

On October 23, 2020, Israel and Sudan agreed to normalize ties, making Sudan the third Arab country to set aside hostilities in two months. The agreement was negotiated on the U.S. side by Trump senior adviser Jared Kushner, Middle East envoy Avi Berkowitz, national security adviser Robert O'Brien, Secretary of State Mike Pompeo and national security official Miguel Correa.

On December 10, 2020, President Trump announced that Israel and the Kingdom of Morocco agreed to establish full diplomatic relations. The agreement was negotiated by Trump senior adviser Jared Kushner and Middle East envoy Avi Berkowitz and marked Kushner and Berkowitz's fourth normalization agreement in as many months. As a component of the deal, the United States agreed to recognize Moroccan sovereignty over the Western Sahara.

On November 30, 2020, Kushner and Berkowitz traveled to Saudi Arabia for negotiations on the Qatar diplomatic crisis. The next day, Kushner continued to Qatar, but left Berkowitz in Saudi Arabia so the duo could continue to mediate the deal between the Saudis and the Qataris over the phone in real time. The negotiations led to a breakthrough, and on January 5, 2021, Kushner and Berkowitz attended the GCC Summit in Saudi Arabia, where the parties signed an agreement ending the Qatar diplomatic crisis. For his efforts in the Middle East, Kushner has twice been nominated for the Nobel Peace Prize.

Years later, Kushner was invited to address a forum at the Harvard Kennedy School to talk about Middle East issues. Tarek Masoud, the school's director of Middle East Initiatives, said he chose Kushner since he was the architect of the Abraham Accords. In the interview, Kushner referred to the valuable potential of Gaza's “waterfront property,” suggesting that Israel should move civilians from Gaza to the Negev desert in southern Israel.

==== US–Mexico–Canada Agreement ====
Shortly after Trump assumed office, Kushner and several administration officials initiated discussions with the Mexican government around renegotiating NAFTA. In April 2017 reports surfaced that Trump intended to withdraw from the trade agreement. Working with counterparts in the Mexican and Canadian governments, Kushner convinced Trump to set aside these plans and instead enter into formal trade negotiations. When the Senate confirmed Robert Lighthizer as United States Trade Representative in May 2017, Lighthizer commenced formal negotiations, leading on the technical aspects of the discussions while Kushner managed the relationships with the Mexican and Canadian governments. On August 27, 2018, the United States and Mexico announced that they had reached a preliminary deal without Canada. A month later, Canada announced that it intended to join the deal as well. At a press conference in the Rose Garden on September 30, 2018, Lighthizer stated that the $1.3 trillion trade deal “would not have happened” without Kushner's efforts. In recognition of these efforts, President Peña Nieto awarded Kushner the Order of the Aztec Eagle, Mexico's highest honor granted to a non-Mexican citizen, calling Kushner a “grand ally” of Mexico and an “important actor” in the U.S.-Mexico relationship.

==== COVID-19 pandemic actions and response ====
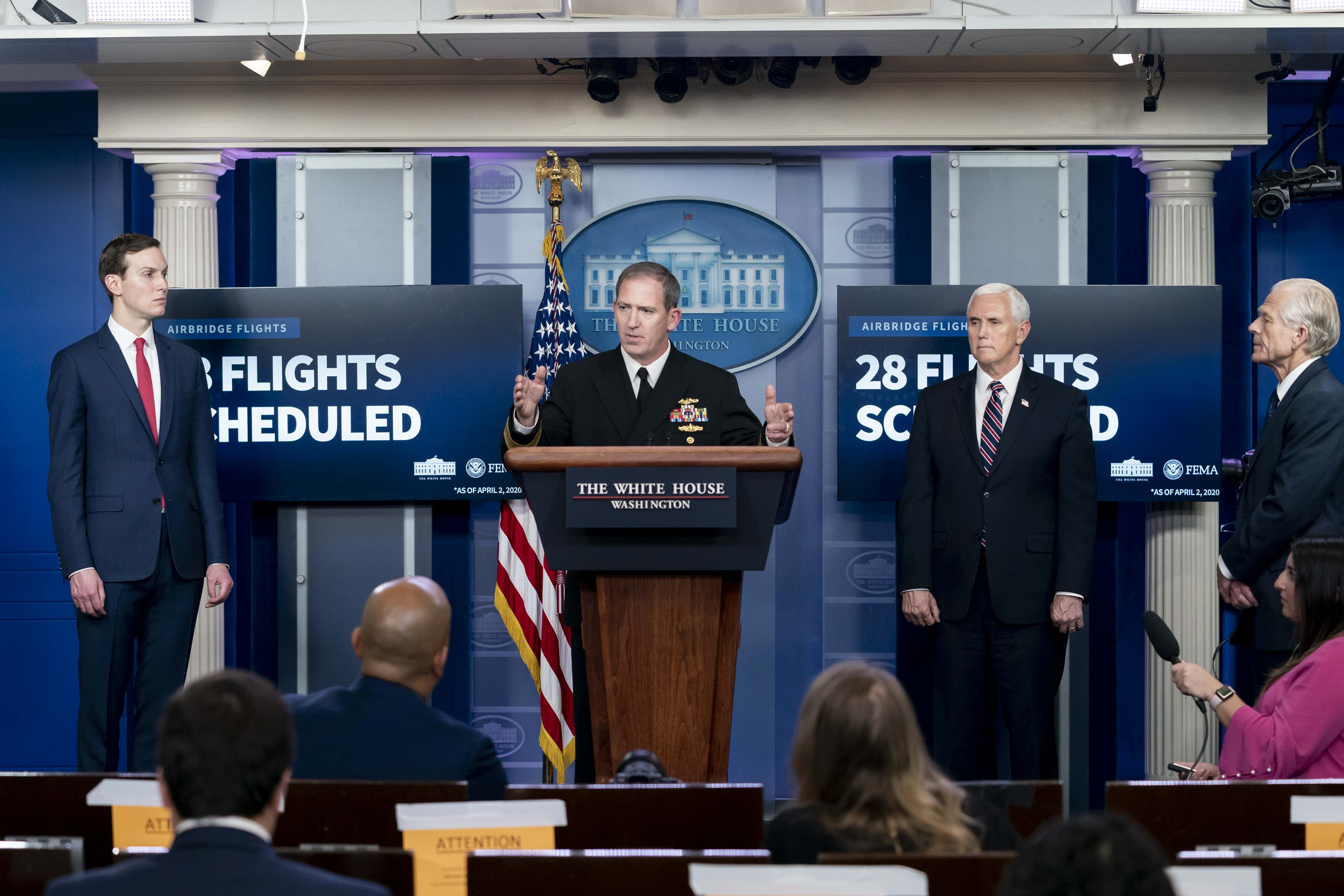
Kushner, Vice President Mike Pence and Peter Navarro during a coronavirus update briefing on April 2, 2020

Amid the COVID-19 pandemic, Kushner was an influential advisor to President Trump, and shaped the administration's actions. At Trump's order, Kushner set up what has been described as a "shadow task force," separate from the official coronavirus task force chaired by Vice President Mike Pence. The Kushner operation was staffed by a dozen young volunteers from the private sector; they worked out of offices on the seventh floor of the Health and Human Services building. Their first assignment was to facilitate the search for medical supplies and protective equipment, with their performance receiving criticism for favoritism shown to Trump associates. According to The Washington Post, numerous rudimentary initiatives proposed by Kushner interrupted the work of other government officials who were seeking to manage the U.S. response to the coronavirus pandemic. The New York Times reported that one way that Kushner was seeking advice on how to deal with the coronavirus outbreak was to ask his brother's father-in-law, a physician, for recommendations. The physician then proceeded to crowdsource advice on a Facebook group for physicians.

Early on during the outbreak, Kushner advised Trump that the media was exaggerating the dangers of the coronavirus outbreak; at the time, Trump downplayed the dangers of the coronavirus. Kushner helped write the Oval Office address that President Trump gave to the nation on March 11, 2020, along with Trump's advisor Stephen Miller. Drafts of the address were not shared with any of the staff working on the coronavirus task force or with the agencies dealing with the coronavirus response, and Kushner, Miller and Vice President Pence (who joined the writing process later on) were still working making edits to the draft shortly before Trump gave the address. The Washington Post wrote that the address that Kushner, who had "zero expertise in infectious diseases and little experience marshaling the full bureaucracy behind a cause", helped write was "widely panned". In the address, Trump blamed Europeans and the Chinese for the virus, describing the virus as a "foreign virus". During the address, Trump inaccurately said "all travel from Europe" would be prohibited, and that the travel prohibitions would apply to goods. The speech caused markets to plunge, as White House aides had to clarify what the actual policy was. European leaders said they were blindsided by the address. The speech set off panic among Americans abroad who had to scramble to learn whether they could return to the United States and under what circumstances; this created chaos at airports in Europe and the United States. Trump reportedly blamed Kushner for the widely panned address, telling aides that he should not have listened to Kushner.

Kushner also helped put together a March 13 Rose Garden event where Trump falsely claimed that Google was "quickly developing" a website that could help test people for coronavirus. Google later clarified their involvement, stating that the website would initially serve the Bay Area. Trump also announced a project intended to set up testing sites across parking lots across the United States, taking the state and federal health care workers who oversee the project by surprise. These drive-through testing sites were later used to support distribution of the coronavirus vaccine. On March 30, 2020, The Atlantic reported that a website that Trump had said would help Americans to diagnose themselves and direct them to a nearby coronavirus testing site in a March 13 press conference had been a project between the government and Oscar Health, a company that Kushner had ties with. Kushner's brother, Joshua, co-founded and owns Oscar Health, and Kushner himself was a partial owner of the firm before joining the White House. The website was quickly scrapped.

"...And the notion of the federal stockpile was it's supposed to be our stockpile; it's not supposed to be state stockpiles that they then use." Comments by Jared Kushner that drew criticism.

In April 2020, Kushner made a rare public appearance, when in the White House briefing room he defended the administration's response to the coronavirus pandemic. In response to requests by state and local governments that the federal government distribute medical supplies to the states, Kushner said, "The notion of the federal stockpile is that it's supposed to be our stockpile. It's not supposed to be states' stockpiles that they then use." The Strategic National Stockpile page on the Public Health Emergency website was retconned on the same day to reflect this new interpretation of its mission.

In late April 2020, the Department of Defense revealed that the federal government had less than 10,000 ventilators remaining in the strategic national stockpile, far short of the anticipated need. At that time, Governor Andrew Cuomo projected that New York would need 37,000 ventilators. New Jersey, Louisiana, and Michigan also requested thousands of ventilators. The Trump administration, however, refused to empty the stockpile to fulfill these requests, claiming that the states needed far fewer than they were projecting. Kushner described the administration's response to the coronavirus as "a great success story." During the pandemic, Kushner relied on a team of volunteers from consulting and private equity firms who had little relevant experience in dealing with a pandemic. Kushner described the volunteers as "true patriots." The team was intended to assist in procuring PPE, but the team struggled to do so. The New York Times wrote that the search for supplies was "fumbling" and that "personal relationships and loyalty are often prized over governmental expertise, and private interests are granted extraordinary access and deference." Kushner's volunteer team advised senior officials in New York that Yaron Oren-Pines, a Silicon Valley engineer, could produce 1,000 ventilators. New York officials assumed that the team had vetted him and gave him an $86 million contract to produce the ventilators; no ventilators were produced.

In May 2020, Kushner reportedly told those involved in the coronavirus response that the coronavirus was under control and that there would not be a second wave. By June 2020, cases were surging in the United States. It was revealed that businesses owned by the Kushner family obtained coronavirus relief, which raised concerns with potential conflicts of interests due to Kushner's White House role.

In August 2020, when 170,000 had died from the coronavirus in the United States, Kushner reiterated his claim from April 2020 that the administration's response had been a "success story."

==== 2020 election aftermath ====
Kushner did not participate in the Trump administration's attempts to overturn the 2020 United States presidential election. He started writing a memoir, made plans to move his family to Miami, and focused on his project of Middle East diplomacy. He met with Biden administration security advisors Jake Sullivan and Jeffrey Zients to prepare for transition of power. During the January 6, 2021 United States Capitol attack, he was returning from a diplomatic trip around the Persian gulf states. On January 11, 2021, he arranged a meeting between vice-president Mike Pence and Donald Trump to try to reconcile their relationship. On March 31, 2022, he voluntarily spoke to the United States House Select Committee on the January 6 Attack for six hours. He was the highest-ranking Trump administration official interviewed to date, as well as the first Trump family member to be interviewed.

In February 2024, Kushner said he wouldn't serve in a second Trump administration.

== Career after the first Trump administration ==
=== Saudi Arabia investment fund ===
Kushner's firm landed more than $2 billion only six months after Kushner stopped working as a senior adviser for the president, to invest in American and Israeli companies expanding in India, Africa, the Middle East and other parts of Asia. Investors included $2 billion from the Saudi public investment fund, with Kushner stating that he hoped to open an "investment corridor between Saudi Arabia and Israel", seen internationally as a "sign of warming ties between two historic rivals". Within the first Trump administration, Kushner had been a staunch defender of Saudi ruler Mohammed bin Salman.

In 2021, Kushner started an investment firm, Affinity Partners. He sought funds for the new company through the sovereign wealth funds of Gulf countries. Advisers for the Public Investment Fund, the Saudi government's sovereign wealth fund, expressed several concerns about the transaction—including the inexperience of Affinity management, the degree of risk to be assumed by the Saudi kingdom, an "excessive" management fee, and a finding that Affinity's operations were "unsatisfactory in all aspects". However, PIF management overruled them and invested $2 billion in Kushner's firm, only six months after Kushner had left the White House. The firm primarily depended on Saudi money, as, by April 2022, it only had $2.5 billion under its management. According to ethics experts, the investment created the appearance of potential payback for Kushner. The House Oversight Committee said on June 2, 2022, that it had opened an investigation into whether Kushner had traded on his government position to get the deal.

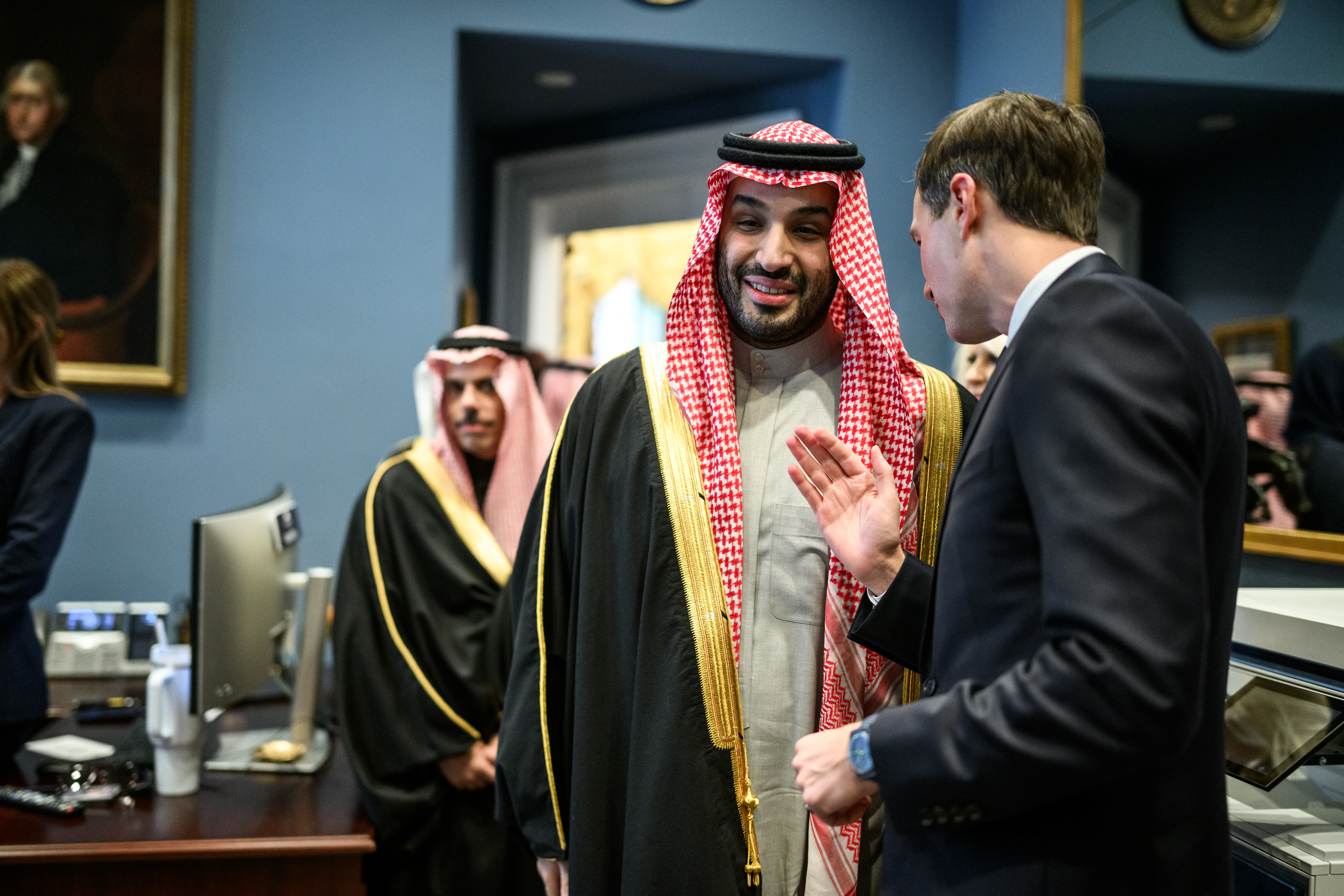
Kushner speaks with Saudi Crown Prince Mohammed bin Salman in the Outer Oval Office on November 18, 2025.

The fund plans to invest Saudi money into startup companies in Israel. According to the Wall Street Journal, "The decision marks the first known instance that the Saudi Public Investment Fund’s cash will be directed to Israel, a sign of the kingdom’s increasing willingness to do business with the country, even though they have no diplomatic relations."

In 2023, Republican candidate for President Chris Christie criticized Kushner and Trump for the deal, saying "Why would you send Jared Kushner to the Middle East when you have Rex Tillerson and Mike Pompeo... You send him? Why? We found out the answer six months after he left office: $2 billion from the Saudis to Jared Kushner and Ivanka Trump, $2 billion, and because he did all this and more with his family. I'm going to end this family grift that's going on. We are not a third-world republic." The Wall Street Journal reported that Kushner has not made any investments despite receiving the funding some years ago, collecting "tens of millions in management fees each year" while not making any investments. Norm Eisen of the Brookings Institution suggested the payments were meant to curry favor with Trump's family, should the former president retake the White House in the 2024 election: "It appears to be money for nothing." The House Oversight Committee Chairman, Kentucky Republican James Comer, said he believes Kushner “crossed the line of ethics” by accepting the investment from Saudi Arabia.

As of 2024, the fund had made $157 million in management fees (including $87 million from the Saudi government alone) since 2021. The fund is under Senate investigation for possible foreign influence buying ahead of the 2024 election after a New York Times report suggested that Kushner used contacts he made from his role in Trump's White House.

In September 2025, Kushner spearheaded a purchase of Electronic Arts with Saudi Arabia's Public Investment Fund (PIF) and Silver Lake. According to the Financial Times, "While a deal of this kind could face regulatory scrutiny in Washington, several people said they expected the transaction to go through fairly easily, citing the influence of Kushner and Saudi Arabia on the White House."

=== Political memoir: Breaking History ===
Kushner wrote a memoir, Breaking History: A White House Memoir, that was published in August 2022.

=== Member of the Indian Creek, Florida Village Council ===
On July 8, 2024, Kushner succeeded Village of Indian Creek Vice Mayor & Village Trustee Javier Holtz, joining the Village council.

=== Diplomatic activity and Ukraine peace-plan efforts ===
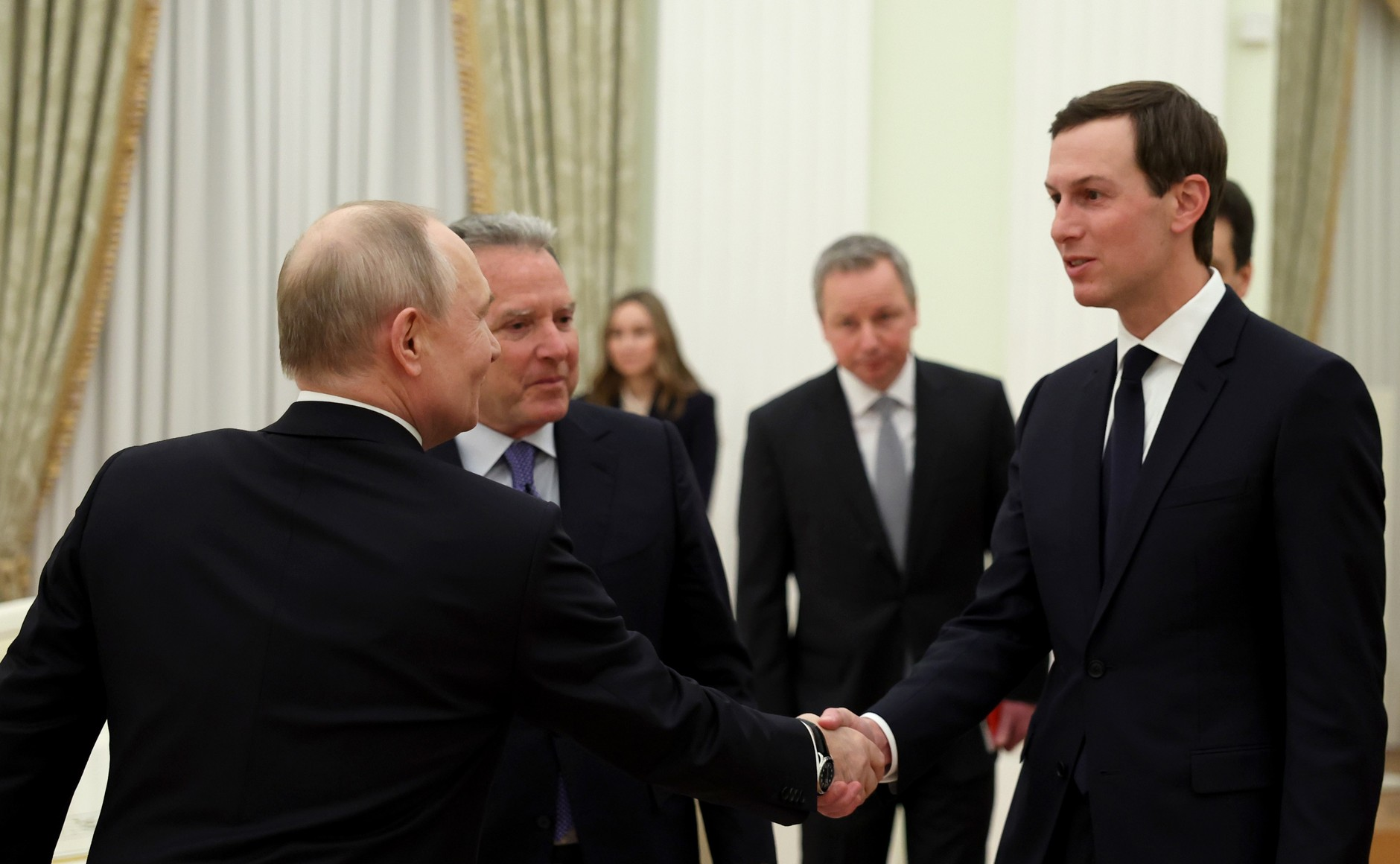
Kushner and Special Envoy Steve Witkoff with Russian President Vladimir Putin, Moscow, January 22, 2026

Kushner with Ukrainian President Volodymyr Zelenskyy, Kyiv, September 6, 2026

In December 2025 Kushner resurfaced as part of a high-stakes U.S. delegation in Trump's second administration. Alongside real-estate investor and special envoy Steve Witkoff, Kushner traveled to Moscow and met for nearly five hours with Russian President Vladimir Putin to discuss a revised U.S. peace proposal aimed at ending the war in Ukraine.

=== 2026 Geneva negotiations and Operation Epic Fury ===
In early 2026, Steve Witkoff and Jared Kushner led high-stakes nuclear negotiations with Iranian officials in Geneva. British National Security Adviser Jonathan Powell, who attended the talks, characterized Tehran's proposal as "surprising" and substantial, suggesting a diplomatic breakthrough remained possible.

However, the negotiations collapsed amid allegations from diplomats and critics that Witkoff and Kushner had misrepresented Iran's positions to President Trump, specifically regarding Tehran's willingness to reduce its enriched uranium stockpile. Following the failure of the summit, the United States and Israel launched a joint military operation against Iran on February 28, 2026, known as Operation Epic Fury.

In the aftermath, The Guardian reported that a Gulf diplomat criticized Witkoff and Kushner's role, describing them as acting like "Israeli assets" and accusing them of "unorthodox and destructive diplomacy" that allegedly manipulated the President into the conflict. On March 20, 2026, Trump signaled a potential "winding down" of military operations in Iran, citing nearing completion of objectives, while Kushner and Witkoff were reported to be exploring a return to diplomacy based on previous Geneva frameworks.

== Controversies ==
=== Allegations of nepotism ===
Kushner's appointment as Trump's senior advisor in the White House in January 2017 was questioned on the basis of a 1967 anti-nepotism law which forbids public officials from hiring family members, and explicitly one's son-in-law, in agencies or offices they oversee. The law was passed in response to President John F. Kennedy's decision to appoint his brother, Robert F. Kennedy, as attorney general in 1961. However, on January 20, 2017, the Department of Justice's Office of Legal Counsel issued an opinion stating the anti-nepotism law does not apply to appointments within the White House, after Kushner's lawyer, Jamie Gorelick claimed the 1967 law does not apply to the White House because it is not an 'agency'. Among other precedents, the OLC opinion invoked a 1993 D.C. Circuit Court ruling that enabled Hillary Clinton to serve within the White House during the Clinton administration. Kushner was sworn in on January 22, 2017 and was given the office which is physically the closest to the Oval Office.

=== Security clearance ===
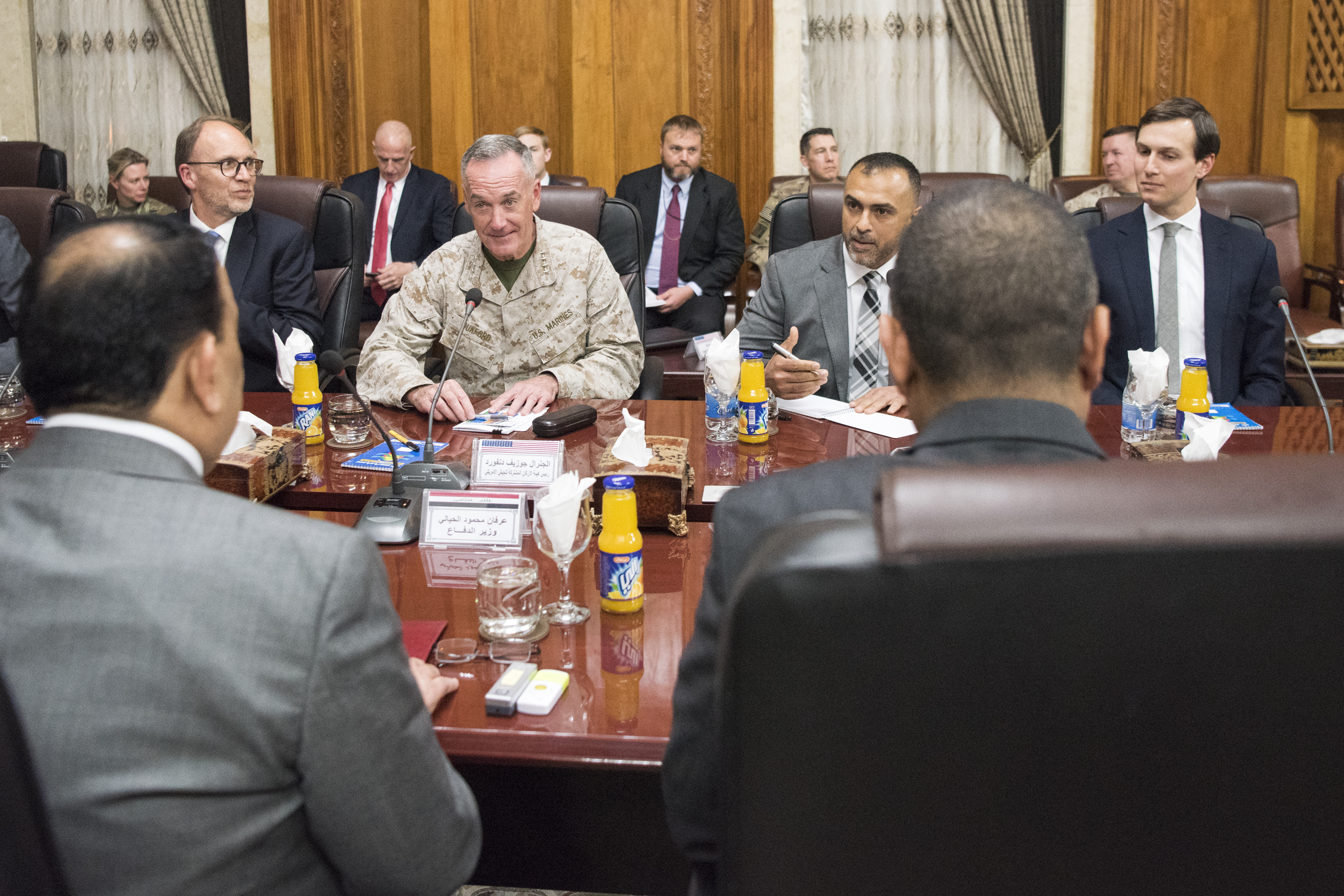
Kushner and Gen. Joseph Dunford, Chairman of the Joint Chiefs of Staff, with Iraqi defence minister Erfan al-Hiyali in Baghdad on April 3, 2017

On January 18, 2017, immediately after his appointment as senior advisor to President Trump, Kushner requested Top Secret security clearance, using "Standard Form 86 (SF86): Questionnaire for National Security Positions". The request omitted all of Kushner's contacts with foreign officials, including the meetings with Kislyak and Gorkov, though he quickly updated his filing to notify government officials that he would supplement his disclosure to provide the required information. Failure to disclose pertinent contacts can cause security clearances to be declined or revoked, and an intentional failure to disclose can result in imprisonment. Kushner's lawyers said that the omissions were "an oversight", and that "a member of [Kushner's] staff had prematurely hit the 'send' button" before the form was completed.

By July 2017, Kushner had updated his SF86, this time disclosing contacts with foreign nationals. This was the first time that government officials were made aware of the June 2016 Trump campaign–Russian meeting and Kushner's role in it.

On September 15, 2017, Carl Kline, the director of the personnel security office within the Executive Office of President Trump, recorded Kushner as having an interim Top Secret/SCI security clearance. Kushner and his wife were among at least 48 officials granted interim clearance giving them access to sensitive compartmented information (SCI): detailed accounts of intelligence sources and methods.

On February 27, 2018, in response to the Rob Porter scandal, White House chief of staff John Kelly downgraded Kushner's interim security clearance to "secret" status, along with other White House staffers working with interim security clearances. White House sources said that part of the reason Kushner had not yet been granted permanent security clearance was that he was under investigation by Robert Mueller.

Kushner finally received permanent Top Secret security clearance on May 23, 2018. In January 2019, Trump told The New York Times that he had not intervened to grant Kushner's security clearances. On February 8, 2019, Kushner's wife Ivanka also denied that Trump had intervened to grant her or Kushner's security clearances. However, on February 28, 2019, CNN (citing three anonymous sources) and The New York Times (citing four anonymous sources) reported that in May 2018 Trump ordered Kelly to grant Kushner a top-secret clearance, which Kelly contemporaneously documented in an internal memo. Reportedly, this was the first time any U.S. president had intervened in such a way. Carl Kline later testified before the House Oversight and Government Reform Committee that there had been no external intervention in the decision to restore Kushner's clearance.

=== Conflicts of interest ===
A Flamingo Revolution protest in Tirana on June 14, 2026, against the Albanian government's approval of Jared Kushner's luxury real estate projects in the Vjosa-Narta nature reserve

While serving in the first Trump administration, Kushner retained ownership of businesses, which drew criticism from government ethics experts who said it created conflicts of interest.

After his appointment as Senior Advisor to Donald Trump (in January 2017), Kushner resigned as head of his family's real-estate firm, Kushner Companies, and partially divested himself of some of its assets, including all his stake in Thrive Capital, a venture capital firm co-founded by his brother, all common stock holdings and over 35 other investments, and his stake in 666 Fifth Avenue. However, he did not actually sell off his assets or set up a blind trust with outside management. Instead, he transferred ownership of some of his assets to his brother and to a trust overseen by his mother rather than selling off his assets to a third party or setting up a blind trust with outside management. The New York Times reported that Kushner managed to retain "the vast majority of his interest in Kushner Companies. His real estate holdings and other investments are worth as much as $761 million." Disclosures he was required to make show that Kushner still receives millions of dollars a year in income from rent collected by his assorted real estate portfolio.

After her father was elected president, global sales of Ivanka Trump merchandise surged. On April 6, 2017, the same day that Kushner and Ivanka dined with Chinese president Xi Jinping and his wife at a dinner hosted by the president at Mar-a-Lago, the Chinese government provisionally approved three new trademarks for the Ivanka Trump brand giving it monopoly rights to sell Ivanka Trump brand jewelry, bags and spa services in the world's second-largest economy. Ivanka applied for the trademarks in 2016 due to concerns about the proliferation of knock off and counterfeits goods being sold under her name in China as her father's presidential campaign progressed.

In March 2026, Representative Robert Garcia and Senator Ron Wyden sent letters to the White House seeking information on Jared Kushner's business dealings in the Middle East. The lawmakers cited reports that Kushner's private equity firm, Affinity Partners, was soliciting billions of dollars in investments from regional governments while he simultaneously served as a negotiator for the administration in the same region. In April 2026, Dem. Jamie Raskin has opened a sweeping investigation that details, Affinity partners had amassed $6.16 billion in assets, including $1.2 billion made in 2025 alone.

In September 2026, CNN published into an investigation into Affinity Partners following its investments in Israeli insurance company Phoenix Financial, which invests in several arms manufacturers contracted by the Israel Defense Forces. In July 2026, Affinity Partners sold about a quarter of its stake in Phoenix Financial for more than $340 million, more than five times what it had initially invested. Affinity kept a 7.4% stake in the company, valued at more than $1 billion at the time, and remained Phoenix's largest shareholder. CNN reported that it found no evidence that Kushner's diplomatic activities had directly influenced the investments it examined. The report cited conflicts of interest given Kushner's role as a negotiator for the Gaza Peace Plan.

=== Use of WhatsApp for White House duties ===
While a White House official, Kushner used WhatsApp to conduct government business, raising concerns among cybersecurity experts that sensitive government communications could be vulnerable to exploitation by foreign governments and hackers. Saudi crown prince Mohammed bin Salman was reportedly one of the individuals that Kushner contacted through WhatsApp; in January 2020, UN investigators said that there was evidence that bin Salman was involved in the hacking of Jeff Bezos's phone through WhatsApp communications, advising that Kushner and others in contact with the Crown Prince should take measures to protect their communications. Kushner reportedly used WhatsApp to communicate with his coronavirus team during March and April 2020. Ethics watchdogs have since confirmed that Kushner turned over his WhatsApp records prior to departing the White House, and that these records have been acquired in full by the National Archives and Records Administration.

=== Pardoning white collar criminals ===
Upon his suggestion and the Aleph Institute, several white collar criminals have been pardoned; for example in 2020 Philip Esformes, who defrauded Medicare for about $1.3 billion.

=== Secret Service protection ===
Jared Kushner was in the list of 13 family members and three Cabinet appointees, who were granted security for an additional six months after Donald Trump left the White House, a dispensation which had also been granted to Sasha and Malia Obama.

In May 2021, four months after Donald Trump had vacated the Presidency, the Daily Beast reported Kushner's Secret Service security team accompanied him to Abu Dhabi, United Arab Emirates, incurring US State Department costs of $12,950. Kushner cited the requirement of high security for which a total of 50 "room nights" at $259 each were booked between May 5 and 14 at Abu Dhabi's Ritz-Carlton hotel. Ethics watchdogs raised concerns of financial connections between Kushner and the UAE, citing that former Senior Advisor to the US president was believed to be "particularly manipulable" by the UAE. A month before Trump left office, Kushner's last overseas trip cost US taxpayers around $24,335 in hotel costs alone.

=== Gaza displacement controversy ===
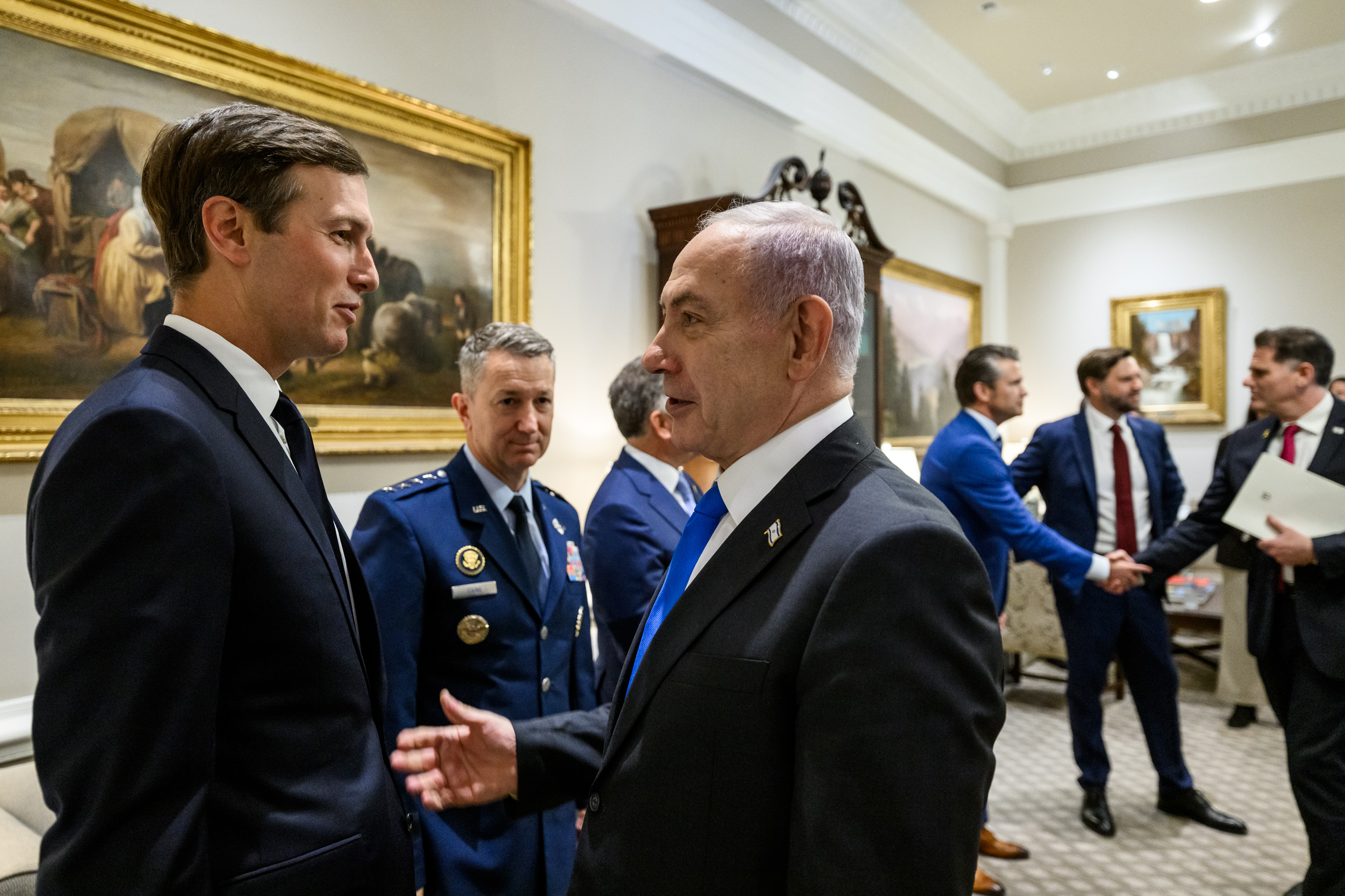
Kushner with Israeli Prime Minister Benjamin Netanyahu at the White House, September 29, 2025

In February 2024, during an appearance at the Harvard Kennedy School, Kushner described the Gaza Strip as "valuable waterfront property" and suggested relocating Palestinian civilians to the Negev desert or Egypt while the territory was "cleaned up", saying "I think that’s a better option, so you can go in and finish the job." In February 2025, U.S. president Donald Trump promoted a Gaza Strip takeover proposal that involved transforming Gaza into a luxury resort, widely linked in media coverage to Kushner's remarks.

The comments drew international criticism. Human rights observers and Palestinian officials have said that Kushner's proposals would amount to forced displacement or ethnic cleansing. The redevelopment vision, which involved large-scale relocation of Gazans, was condemned by Palestinian civilians, leaders, Arab governments, and international rights groups, and organizations such as the United Nations, as being both unrealistic and contrary to international law.

== Personal life ==
Kushner has a younger brother, Joshua, and two sisters, Dara and Nicole. He married Ivanka Trump in a Jewish ceremony on October 25, 2009. They had met in 2005 through mutual friends. Kushner and Ivanka (who converted to Judaism in 2009) are Modern Orthodox Jews, keep a kosher home, and observe the Jewish Shabbat. They have three children, a daughter born in July 2011 and two sons, born in October 2013 and March 2016.

In 2004, Kushner's father pleaded guilty to eighteen felony counts of tax fraud, election violations, and witness tampering. He retaliated against his own sister who was a cooperating witness in the case. The case against Charles Kushner was prosecuted by Chris Christie, who later became Governor of New Jersey and, for a period was part of Donald Trump's election campaign team in 2016. Christie subsequently claimed that Jared Kushner was responsible for having him fired as revenge for sending his father to prison.

In 2017, federal disclosures suggested Kushner and his wife Ivanka Trump had assets worth at least $240 million, and as much as $740 million. They also have an art collection, estimated to be worth millions, that was not mentioned in the financial disclosures initially. The United States Office of Government Ethics has said that the updated disclosures comply with the regulations and laws.

Kushner was diagnosed with thyroid cancer in October 2019 and underwent treatment for it during the first Trump administration, he recounts in his political memoir. In August 2022 he underwent a second thyroid surgery. Kushner appeared in the 2022 documentary Unprecedented.

In September 2025, Forbes reported Kushner to be a billionaire.

== Honors ==
Country	Date	Appointment	Ribbon	Ref.
United States	2020	National Security Medal		
United States	2021	Department of Defense Medal for Distinguished Public Service		
Mexico	2018	Sash of the Order of the Aztec Eagle		
Morocco	2021	Grand Cordon of the Order of Ouissam Alaouite		
Hungary	2022	Commander's Cross of the Hungarian Order of Merit		

== Selected publications ==
- Kushner, Jared (March 14, 2021). "Opinion: Opportunity Beckons in the Mideast". The Wall Street Journal. ISSN 0099-9660.
- Kushner, Jared (2022). Breaking History: a White House memoir. New York: HarperCollins. ISBN 978-0-06-322148-2. OCLC 1319741976.

== See also ==
- Kushner family – American business and political family
- Links between Trump associates and Russian officials
- Mueller special counsel investigation – U.S. investigation into Russian interference in U.S. elections
  - Mueller report – 2019 U.S. government report on Russian interference in the 2016 election
