= St. Peter Chanel High School =

Location
- 480 Northfield Road; Bedford, (Cuyahoga County), Ohio 44146-2203; United States
- 41°24′11″N 81°31′41″W

Information
- Type: Private, Coeducational
- Motto: "Quaecumque Excelsa" (To Seek What Is Above)
- Religious affiliation: Roman Catholic
- Established: 1957
- Closed: 2013
- Oversight: Roman Catholic Diocese of Cleveland
- Grades: 9–12
- Average class size: 22
- Student to teacher ratio: 14:1
- Campus: Suburban
- Colors: Scarlet and White
- Mascot: Firebird
- Team name: Firebirds
- Rival: Trinity High School
- Accreditation: North Central Association of Colleges and Schools, Ohio Catholic School Accrediting Association
- Newspaper: The Flame
- Yearbook: Invictus
- Website: http://www.stpeterchanel.com/

Saint Peter Chanel High School was a Catholic high school located in Bedford, Ohio, United States, from 1957 to 2013. The school was closed by the Cleveland Catholic Diocese following a drastic, decreasing trend in enrollment.

== Buildings ==
Designed by George W. Stickle and associates of Cleveland, the school was a steel structure with an ashlar limestone brick pattern. The school building is a four-story structure. St. Peter Chanel's gymnasium held an estimated 2,400–3,000 people. The gymnasium had naming rights. Ripp Field (1973) held 3,500 fans, and added an all-weather track in 2006.

== History ==
In 1950, Archbishop Edward Francis Hoban purchased 94 acres (380,000 m^{2}) of the Tarbell estate on Northfield Road for either a new parish or a high school. In 1951, Monsignor Joseph Heruday, a priest at St. Wenceslas Parish, suggested that Archbishop Hoban establish a new parish to help ease overcrowding at St. Wenceslas parish. At this time, Maple Heights, Ohio was fast growing with development. Lear Sigler Developers were proposing new homes on Applegate and Donnybrook as part of the new Southgate Shopping Center. At this time in neighboring Garfield Heights, Ohio, St. Therese Parish was also experiencing overcrowding.

In December 1951, Archbishop Hoban met with Fr. Charles Willis SM in a meeting in New Orleans. With Archbishop Hoban was Bishop John Krol, who was superintendent of Catholic Education who proposed the need for a new Catholic Parish and School in Cleveland. On 17 March 1952, the Marist Fathers and Archbishop Hoban establish Blessed Pius X Parish in Bedford. On 1 April 1952, Archbishop Hoban established St. Monica Parish in Garfield Heights. In 1954, Blessed Pius X Parish became St. Pius X Parish (now Our Lady of Hope Parish) and its school (now Holy Spirit Academy) opened, also that same year St. Monica School opened. At the time Marymount High needed a newer modern building and the Marists were planning their high school.

In 1955, Fr. Charles Willis approached Fr. Hugh Gallagher to donate land for their new high school, but the Sisters of St. Joseph wanted the land for Marymount High School. Archbishop Hoban had to intervene. There would no new high school at St. Monicas. In late 1955, the Sisters of St. Joseph broke ground for new Marymount High on the corner of East 126th Street and Granger Road. In 1954, voters of Bedford approved a bond issue for new Bedford High, which is currently on Northfield Road. On 10 January 1956, Bedford broke ground for their new high school, 20 days later on 30 January 1956, the Marists broke ground on their $1.89 million high school across the street from new Bedford High. The Marists named their new high school, St. Peter Chanel High School, named after the first saint of order, two years before Pope Pius XII canonized Peter Chanel as saint.

On 7 September 1957, St. Peter Chanel opened with 61 Freshmen. The school was still under construction. There was no football field and baseball diamonds for new school. That same day new Bedford High opened too. October 1958, Archbishop Edward Hoban officially dedicated St. Peter Chanel High School.

On 30 March 1962 St. Peter Chanel had to expand the school, that same year St. Peter Chanel established WCHS-TV, making St. Peter Chanel the first high school in Cleveland to have a closed circuited TV network. In 1963, the expansion was completed, the 1963 section harmonizes with the 1957 section seamlessly. The 1963 section is called the Willard Wing by St. Peter Chanel Students because of the nearby street named Willard Drive.

In 1973, the Marists gave control of St. Peter Chanel to the Diocese of Cleveland. Also in that year, Ripp Field was renovated with lights for night time football games.

In the mid-1980s, St. Peter Chanel faced closure or co-education for girls; the choice was co-education. In the 1986–87 school year the first girls entered St. Peter Chanel, as nearby Lumen Cordium closed and many girls from Lumen joined the ranks at St. Peter Chanel. Lumen Cordium today is nursing home named Light of Hearts Villa.

In the 1990–91 school year, St. Peter Chanel had a fire in its chemistry laboratory. According to the Bedford Fire Department, there was $250,000–500,000 of fire damage. Fire departments from Bedford, Maple Heights, Bedford Heights and Garfield Heights responded to the fire. This led to the creation of the Chagrin-Southeast Hazmat unit. The school had to be renovated due to this. The lobby, chemistry laboratory and library were damaged. Many of the library's books had to be frozen to dry them out.

In the early 1990s, St. Peter Chanel had a notorious losing streak in football. From 1990 to 1994 the Firebirds were 0–50, until September 1994, when St. Peter Chanel defeated neighboring Garfield Heights by a score of 36–0, and the streak was over. That season the Firebirds finished 6–4 overall under Dick Marabito. That same year, the Marist Fathers left due to declining vocations. For a short time, from 1994 to 1999, the Sisters of Notre Dame helped.

St. Peter Chanel expanded again for the wrestling room which opened in 2007.

On December 14, 2012, the Catholic Diocese of Cleveland announced that the school would close at the end of the 2012–2013 school year. The diocesan school superintendent, in a letter to school officials, cited falling enrollment, failure of tuition payments to cover the costs of educating the students, and the burden born by the diocese in subsidizing the school over the past year as being factors considered in making the decision.

St. Peter Chanel closed on June 7, 2013. The building was purchased by Bedford City Schools in 2018. In September 2019, it was announced that the school would be demolished. On July 29, 2020, demolition began on the school.

== Alumni ==
- Ernie Kellermann, '61, former Cleveland Browns player 1965–1969
- Basil Russo, '65
- Al Gerhardstein, '69, civil rights attorney
- Gene Smith, '73, Ohio State University athletic director
- Kevin K. Gaines, '78, Julian Bond Professor of Civil Rights and Social Justice
- Eid Hamway, ‘95, Wrestler
- Markus Steele, '97, former NFL player
- Steve Cargile, '00, former NFL player
- Brandon "Bam" Childress, '00, former NFL player
- Ja'Ron Smith, '00, political advisor
- Terrence Upchurch, '07, Ohio House of Representative

== Notable athletic achievements ==
- Boys' basketball: State Champions: 1999
  - State Final: four appearances: 1991, 1996, 1999, 2003, 2008, 2010, 2012
- Girls' basketball:
  - 2001, 2007 State Final Four
- American football: State Champions: 2001
  - Runners up: 2000
- Wrestling: State Champions: – 1983, 1986, 1987, 1988, 2011
  - Runners up 1984, 1994, 1995, 2001, 2002, 2004, 2005
