= Office of American Innovation =

Defunct United States government office

Agency overview
- Formed: March 27, 2017
- Dissolved: January 20, 2021
- Headquarters: White House
- Parent agency: Executive Office of the President of the United States

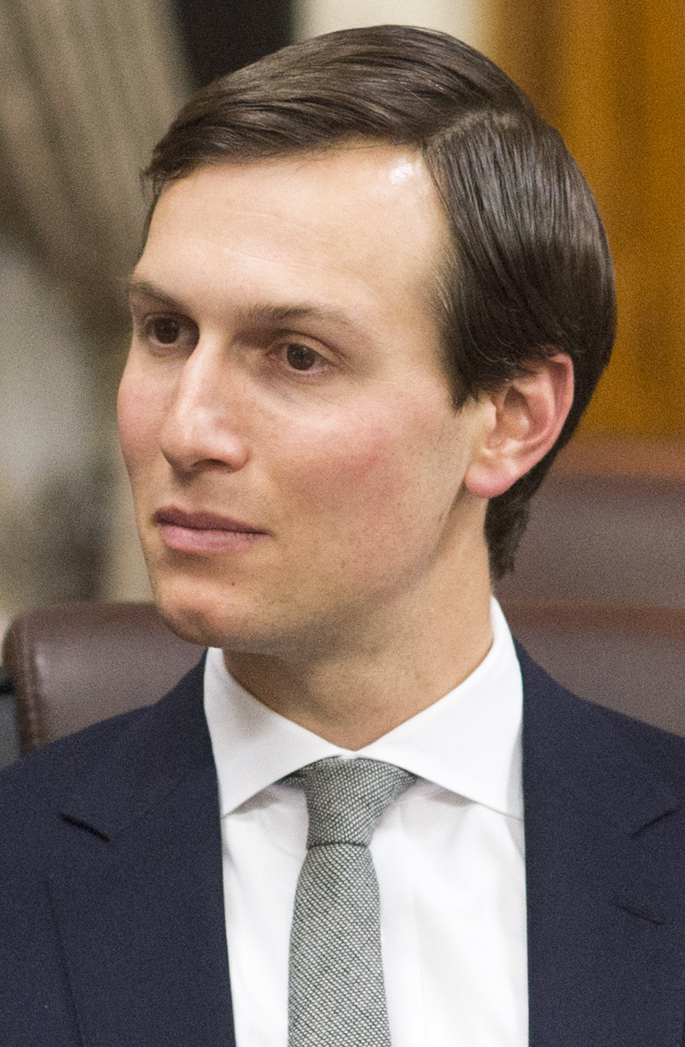
Former Director Jared Kushner

The Office of American Innovation (OAI) was an office within the White House Office that existed from 2017 until 2021 during the first Trump administration. Under Jared Kushner, the office's purpose was to be the liaison between the White House and the American tech industry as part of an effort to reform the federal bureaucracy by applying business principles.

== Establishment ==
The Office of American Innovation (OAI) was established by President Donald Trump on March 27, 2017, with the purpose to "make recommendations to the President on policies and plans that improve Government operations and services, improve the quality of life for Americans now and in the future, and spur job creation." The office was to draw on the lessons of the private sector to bring "new thinking and real change" to the country's problems, including the federal government's IT spend, economic activity, and the opioid crisis. According to Politico, the office was intended to be the White House's primary point of contact with the tech industry.

== Personnel ==
OAI was directed by President Trump's son-in-law and Senior Advisor to the President Jared Kushner, By July 2017, OAI's operational team consisted of Kushner, Liddell, Reed Cordish, and Matt Lira. Communications were run by Josh Raffel, a former Hollywood public relations executive, until February 2018, when Raffel announced his resignation from the position. Between April 2019 to November 2020, Ja'Ron Smith served as the office's Deputy Director.

== Activities ==
After its founding in May 2017, OAI convened a summit of more than a dozen tech CEOs, including Amazon's Jeff Bezos, Tim Cook of Apple, Satya Nadella of Microsoft, and Ginni Rometty of IBM. The office was also involved in the Department of Veterans Affairs' purchase of a multi-billion dollar computer system and the administration's executive order on apprenticeships.

In its first year, the office established the Trump Administration's IT Modernization Plan. It also established a Centers of Excellence program within the General Services Administration in December 2017 that encouraged federal agencies to move to the cloud and improve data management. The program was included in the 2019 United States federal budget to implement the recommendation of the IT Modernization Plan.

== Closure ==
The office was closed during the Presidential transition of Joe Biden in 2021, and there were no plans to revive it.
