= Ernie Kellermann =

American football player (1943–2025)

No. 24
- Position: Safety

Personal information
- Born: December 17, 1943; Cleveland, Ohio, U.S.
- Died: February 5, 2025 (aged 81); Chagrin Falls, Ohio, U.S.
- Listed height: 6 ft 0 in (1.83 m)
- Listed weight: 183 lb (83 kg)

Career information
- High school: St. Peter Chanel (Bedford, Ohio)
- College: Miami (OH)
- NFL draft: 1965: 12th round, 159th overall pick

Career history
- Dallas Cowboys (1965)*; Cleveland Browns (1965–1971); Cincinnati Bengals (1972); Buffalo Bills (1973)
- * Offseason or practice squad member only

Awards and highlights
- Pro Bowl (1968); Second-team All-Pro (1969); 3× All-MAC (1962, 1963, 1964)

Career NFL statistics
- Interceptions: 19
- Fumble recoveries: 6
- Touchdowns: 1
- Stats at Pro Football Reference

Ernie James Kellermann (December 17, 1943 – February 5, 2025) was an American professional football player who was a safety in the National Football League (NFL) for the Cleveland Browns, Cincinnati Bengals and the Buffalo Bills. He played college football for the Miami Redhawks.

== Early life ==
Kellermann played quarterback and defensive back for the St. Peter Chanel High School Firebirds and he was a member of the first graduating class of the school in 1961.

He accepted a scholarship from Miami University, where he was coached by John Pont and Bo Schembechler. He became a three-time All-Mid-American Conference quarterback from 1962 to 1964. He established 14 records and is still Miami University's all-time total offensive leader with 3,978 yards. His biggest game passing came against Houston in the 1962 Tangerine Bowl when he completed 17 of 40 passes for 265 yards.

In his senior year, he set four passing records by completing 88 of 149 passes for 1,260 yards and a completion percentage of .591. His 88-yard touchdown pass enabled Miami to defeat Purdue, 10–7, for the upset of the collegiate football season in 1962.

== Professional career ==
Kellermann was selected by the Dallas Cowboys in the 12th round (159th overall) of the 1965 NFL draft. He was converted into a defensive back, but was waived on September 13.

In 1965, he was signed to the taxi squad of his hometown Cleveland Browns based on a recommendation from Schembechler. The next year, he made the team as a safety and played through the 1971 season, recording 17 interceptions over those six seasons. He was named to the Pro Bowl in 1968; he intercepted six passes that year, his highest season total. His lone NFL touchdown came in 1969 on an interception return against the Green Bay Packers. He was released during final roster cuts on September 12, 1972.

Kellermann played for Cincinnati Bengals in 1972 and the Buffalo Bills in 1973 before retiring.

== Death ==
Kellermann died on February 5, 2025, at the age of 81.
