= Breaking History =

2022 book by Jared Kushner

Breaking History: A White House Memoir
- First edition
- Author: Jared Kushner
- Subject: Memoir
- Publisher: Broadside Books
- Publication date: 2022
- Pages: 512
- ISBN: 9780063221482

Breaking History: A White House Memoir is a 2022 political memoir by Jared Kushner recounting his service as senior presidential advisor in the first Trump administration.

== Contents ==
In the memoir, Kushner says that he was diagnosed with thyroid cancer in October 2019 and underwent treatment for it during the first Trump Administration.

== Bibliography ==
- Kushner, Jared (2022). Breaking History: A White House Memoir. New York, NY: Broadside Books. ISBN 978-0-06-322148-2. OCLC 1319741976.
- Bowden, John (August 24, 2022). "Jared Kushner book reveals his hatred for Steve Bannon". The Independent.
- Garner, Dwight (August 17, 2022). "Jared Kushner's 'Breaking History' Is a Soulless and Very Selective Memoir". The New York Times. ISSN 0362-4331.
- Green, Lloyd (August 14, 2022). "Breaking History review: Jared Kushner's dispiriting Trump book". The Guardian. ISSN 0261-3077.
- Levin, Bess (August 17, 2022). "Jared Kushner Memoir Reviewed Less Favorably Than an Anesthesia-Free Colonoscopy". Vanity Fair.
- Miller, Laura (August 22, 2022). "I've Read Nearly All the Books by Former Trump Officials. Now We Have the Worst". Slate. ISSN 1091-2339.
- Spiers, Elizabeth (August 26, 2022). "Review – Jared Kushner's memoir is only inadvertently revealing". The Washington Post. ISSN 0190-8286.
- Stanley, Tim (August 23, 2022). "Breaking History by Jared Kushner review: how to run a country with zero experience". The Telegraph. ISSN 0307-1235.
