= Kevin K. Gaines =

American professor

- Born: Cleveland, Ohio, United States
- Education: Harvard University; Brown University
- Occupation: Professor
- Employer: University of Virginia
- Notable work: Uplifting the Race: Black Leadership, Politics, and Culture in the Twentieth Century (1996)
- Awards: John Hope Franklin Publication Prize, Choice's Outstanding Academic Titles

Kevin K. Gaines is an American academic who is the inaugural Julian Bond Professor of Civil Rights and Social Justice and a professor of African American history at the University of Virginia. He additionally holds appointments with the Carter G. Woodson Institute for African American and African Studies and the Corcoran Department of History. Gaines’ research includes racial integrationist projects and the relationship between racism, capitalism, patriarchy, and homophobia.

== Early life ==
Gaines was born and raised in Cleveland, Ohio. He attended St. Peter Chanel High School graduating in 1978. He received a bachelor's degree from Harvard University and a Ph.D. from Brown University through the Department of American Civilization. While at Brown, he became the volunteer director of the local campus radio station's jazz programming, and has since spoken of how jazz has informed his political work as a marker of black cultural identity.

== Career ==
From 1996 to 1997, Gaines served as a National Humanities Center fellow, during which time he published several essays as well as a monograph entitled "African American Expatriates in Nkrumah's Ghana, 1957–1966."

From 1997 to 1999, Gaines was an associate professor of history and African American studies at the University of Texas at Austin.

In 1997, Gaines was awarded the John Hope Franklin Publication Prize from the American Studies Association (ASA) for his book Uplifting the Race: Black Leadership, Politics, and Culture in the Twentieth Century, which had originally been written as his graduate dissertation. From 2009 to 2010, Gaines served as the president of the ASA.

Gaines’ second book, African Americans in Ghana: Black Expatriates and the Civil Rights Era, was selected as one of Choice’s Outstanding Academic Titles in 2006.

From 2005 to 2010, he was the director of the Department of Afroamerican and African Studies at the University of Michigan. He was also the Robert Hayden Collegiate Professor of Afroamerican and African Studies.

From 2015 to 2018, Gaines taught at Cornell University as the W. E. B. Du Bois Professor of Africana Studies and History. He was additionally a member of the Public Voices Fellowship program, a campaign designed to share the work of underrepresented thinkers in academia. Through this fellowship, he published an op-ed in Ebony regarding race relations and student protests on college campuses.

In 2018, Gaines joined the University of Virginia as the college's first Julian Bond Professor of Civil Rights and Social Justice. While there, he was selected to be part of a renaming committee, dedicated to the discussion and potential renaming of various UVA buildings and memorials that had been named for Confederates, eugenicists, and similar figures.

In 2020, Gaines testified as an expert witness regarding the removal of a statue of Confederate States General Robert E. Lee in Richmond, Virginia, arguing instead for the establishment of a memorial to enslaved people in its place.

== Writings ==
=== Books ===
- Uplifting the Race: Black Leadership, Politics, and Culture in the Twentieth Century (University of North Carolina Press, 1996)
- African Americans in Ghana: Black Expatriates and the Civil Rights Era (University of North Carolina Press, 2006)

=== Articles ===
- "How Racial Divisions at Colleges Start in a Segregated Society", Ebony, March 9, 2016.
