= Bam Childress =

American football player (born 1982)

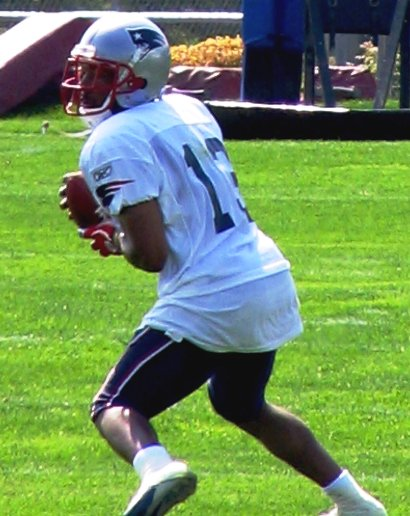

No. 13
- Position: Wide receiver

Personal information
- Born: March 31, 1982 (age 44); Bedford, Ohio, U.S.
- Listed height: 5 ft 9 in (1.75 m)
- Listed weight: 185 lb (84 kg)

Career information
- High school: St. Peter Chanel (Bedford)
- College: Ohio State
- NFL draft: 2005: undrafted

Career history
- New England Patriots (2005–2007); Philadelphia Eagles (2008)*; Saskatchewan Roughriders (2009)*
- * Offseason or practice squad member only

Awards and highlights
- BCS national champion (2002)

Career NFL statistics
- Receptions: 5
- Receiving yards: 39
- Stats at Pro Football Reference
- Stats at CFL.ca (archive)

Brandon N. "Bam" Childress (born March 31, 1982) is an American former professional football player who was a wide receiver for the New England Patriots of the National Football League (NFL). He played college football for the Ohio State Buckeyes and was signed by the Patriots as an undrafted free agent in 2005. Childress was also a member of the NFL's Philadelphia Eagles and Saskatchewan Roughriders of the Canadian Football League (CFL).

== Early life ==
Over the course of his junior year playing football at St. Peter Chanel High School in Bedford, Ohio, Childress set school season receiving records for catches (53) and yardage (874). As a basketball player at Chanel, Childress also helped lead the Firebirds to a perfect 26–0 season and the Division III state title averaging 18 points per game.

Chanel's football team went 13–1 during Childress' senior season in 1999. The team lost in the Division V state semi-final to Amanda Clearcreek as Childress amassed more than 300 total yards. For the season, he totaled 41 receptions for 754 yards and 11 touchdowns. He also added over 700 yards on punt returns and over 600 yards on kickoff returns.

Childress closed his career as the school's all-time leader in scoring (202 points), touchdowns (33), receiving yards (2,258), TD receptions (21), punt returns for a touchdown (seven) and all-purpose yardage (7,103).

He was named Ohio's Mr. Football in 1999 as the state's top player.

== College career ==
- Signed with OSU as a cornerback in the 2000 recruiting class of then-head coach John Cooper.
- Moved to receiver when coach Jim Tressel took over in 2001.
- During his five seasons (2000–04) as a member of the Ohio State University football team, Childress made 33 receptions for 392 yards. He also performed as a kick returner during his career and recorded nine returns for 159 yards.
- Was a member of the 2002 BCS National Championship team.
- He finally got a chance at meaningful playing time as a senior in 2004 but did not play much during the second half of the season. He finished the year with 17 receptions and 205 yards.
- He majored in Family Resource Management.

== Professional career ==
=== New England Patriots ===
Childress was signed as an undrafted free agent by the New England Patriots out of college in 2005. He signed a short-term deal, participated in training camp, and played well in the preseason, both as a wide receiver and extra defensive back. Because of his hard work and determination to make the team he earned a spot on the New England Patriots practice squad. Childress was activated for the last game of the 2005 season against the Miami Dolphins and played well in a losing effort, finishing with three catches for thirty-two yards.

Prior to the Patriots' 2006 season opener, the team released him, signed him to their practice squad, and then activated him again. After the opener, he was released, signed to the practice squad, and later activated on December 23. Childress spent all of the 2007 on the Patriots' practice squad.

=== Philadelphia Eagles ===
After Childress' practice squad contract expired following the 2007 season, he signed a two-year contract with the Philadelphia Eagles on February 22, 2008. He was waived on August 29, 2008.

=== Saskatchewan Roughriders ===
Childress was signed by the Saskatchewan Roughriders of the Canadian Football League on January 12, 2009. He was a final cut on June 25, 2009.
