= Steve Cargile =

American football player (born 1982)

No. 38, 37 – Houston Texans
- Title: Director of pro scouting

Personal information
- Born: June 2, 1982 (age 44); Cleveland, Ohio, U.S.
- Listed height: 6 ft 2 in (1.88 m)
- Listed weight: 215 lb (98 kg)

Career information
- High school: St. Peter Chanel (OH)
- College: Columbia
- NFL draft: 2004: undrafted

Career history

Playing
- Dallas Cowboys (2004); Tampa Bay Buccaneers (2006)*; Denver Broncos (2006–2007); Cleveland Browns (2008)*; New York Giants (2009)*; Tampa Bay Buccaneers (2009)
- * Offseason or practice squad member only

Operations
- New England Patriots (2021–2023) Director of pro scouting; Houston Texans (2024–present); Senior personnel executive/Assistant director of pro scouting (2024-2025); Director of pro scouting (2026-present)

Awards and highlights
- Second-team All-Ivy League (2003)

Career NFL statistics
- Games played: 16
- Total tackles: 11
- Forced fumbles: 1
- Stats at Pro Football Reference

Steven Glenn Cargile (born June 2, 1982) is an American football executive and former safety. He was a member of the for Dallas Cowboys, Tampa Bay Buccaneers, Denver Broncos, Cleveland Browns and New York Giants. He played college football at Columbia University.

== Early life ==
Cargile attended St. Peter Chanel High School, where he practiced football, basketball, track and baseball. As a senior in football, he was an All-state selection at wide receiver and All-conference at safety, while helping his team achieve a 13-1 record. He was named all-county in basketball, while helping hid team win the Division III state championship.

He attended Columbia University, where he played college football as a wide receiver in his first three years. As a sophomore, he appeared in 7 games a backup, tallying 14 receptions for 184 yards and 3 touchdowns.

As a junior, he started 7 out of 10 games at wide receiver, making 24 receptions (fourth on the team) for 320 yards and 4 touchdowns.

As a senior, he was converted into a strong safety, registering 10 starts, 99 tackles (led the team), 3 passes defensed, 2 interceptions and one forced fumble, while receiving Second-team All-Ivy League recognition.

== Professional career ==
Pre-draft measurables
Height	Weight	40-yard dash
6 ft 1 1/4 in (1.86 m)	210 lb (95 kg)	4.58 s
All values from Pro Day

=== Dallas Cowboys ===
Cargile was signed as an undrafted free agent by the Dallas Cowboys after the 2004 NFL draft. He was waived on September 5 and signed to the practice squad two days later. He was promoted to the active roster on December 5, but was declared inactive for the game against the New York Giants. He was released on May 3, 2005.

=== Tampa Bay Buccaneers (first stint) ===
After being out of football for a year, he was signed as a free agent by the Tampa Bay Buccaneers on January 10, 2006. He was cut on September 1.

=== Denver Broncos ===
On November 13, 2006, the Denver Broncos signed him to their practice squad. He was promoted to the active roster and played in three games, after safety Nick Ferguson was placed on the injured reserve list.

In 2007, he was tried at outside linebacker before being released on August 31 and signed to the practice squad on September 1. On September 28, he was promoted to the active roster. He was cut on April 27, 2008, after playing mainly on special teams for the Broncos.

=== Cleveland Browns ===
On April 29, 2008, he was claimed off waivers by the Cleveland Browns. He was released on August 10.

=== New York Giants ===
On January 16, 2009, he signed with the New York Giants as a free agent. He was waived on July 31.

=== Tampa Bay Buccaneers (second stint) ===
On August 19, 2009, he was signed as a free agent by the Buccaneers. He was released on September 5. He was re-signed on September 18. He played in one game against the Buffalo Bills and was cut on September 21.

== Post-playing career ==
=== New England Patriots ===
Starting in 2011, Cargile worked as a professional scout for the New England Patriots. He and the Patriots organization parted ways on May 17, 2024.

=== Houston Texans ===
On July 2, 2024, the Houston Texans hired Cargile to serve as a senior personnel executive.
