= List of After Words interviews first aired in 2014 =

After Words is an American television series on the C-SPAN2 network’s weekend programming schedule known as Book TV. The program is an hour-long talk show, each week featuring an interview with the author of a new nonfiction book. The program has no regular host. Instead, each author is paired with a guest host who is familiar with the author or the subject matter of their book.

First air date (Links to video)	Interviewee(s)	Interviewer(s)	Book	Topic of interview / Comments
January 4, 2014	Yuval Levin	Jonah Goldberg	The Great Debate: Edmund Burke, Thomas Paine, and the Birth of Right and Left	Edmund Burke, Thomas Paine
January 11, 2014	Ranya Tabari Idliby	Daisy Khan	Burqas, Baseball, and Apple Pie: Being Muslim in America	Islam in the United States, Stereotypes of Arabs and Muslims in the United States
January 18, 2014	Nicholas Johnson	Zaheer Ali	Negroes and the Gun: The Black Tradition of Arms	
January 25, 2014	Felipe Fernandez-Armesto	Tanzina Vega	Our America: A Hispanic History of the United States	Hispanic and Latino Americans, History of Hispanic and Latino Americans
February 1, 2014	Angela Stent	Dimitri Simes	The Limits of Partnership: U.S.-Russian Relations in the Twenty-First Century	Russia–United States relations
February 8, 2014	John Rizzo	Dana Priest	Company Man: Thirty Years of Controversy and Crisis in the CIA	Central Intelligence Agency
February 15, 2014	Keith Ellison	Corey Mitchell	My Country, 'Tis of Thee: My Faith, My Family, Our Future	
February 22, 2014	Aram Goudsouzian	Rich Benjamin	Down to the Crossroads: Civil Rights, Black Power, and the Meredith March Against Fear	James Meredith
March 1, 2014	Gabriel Sherman	Jane Hall	The Loudest Voice in the Room: How the Brilliant, Bombastic Roger Ailes Built Fox News -- and Divided a Country	Roger Ailes, Fox News
March 8, 2014	Amy Chua & Jed Rubenfeld	David Plotz	The Triple Package: How Three Unlikely Traits Explain the Rise and Fall of Cultural Groups in America	
March 15, 2014	George Nash	Amity Shlaes	The Crusade Years 1933-1955: Herbert Hoover's Lost Memoir of the New Deal Era and Its Aftermath	Herbert Hoover
March 22, 2014	Paul Taylor	Jonathan Last	The Next America: Boomers, Millennials, and the Looming Generational Showdown	Millennials, Baby Boomers
March 29, 2014	Walid Phares	Joshua Muravchik	The Lost Spring: U.S. Policy in the Middle East and Catastrophes to Avoid	United States foreign policy in the Middle East, Arab Spring
April 5, 2014	Zachary Karabell	Kimberly Strassel	The Leading Indicators: A Short History of the Numbers that Rule Our World	
April 12, 2014	Cal Thomas	Juan Williams	What Works: Common Sense Solutions for a Stronger America	
April 19, 2014	Ezekiel Emanuel	Sally Satel	Reinventing American Health Care: How the Affordable Care Act Will Improve Our Terribly Complex, Blatantly Unjust, Outrageously Expensive, Grossly Inefficient, Error Prone System	Patient Protection and Affordable Care Act
April 26, 2014	Patrick Tucker	Heidi Boghosian	The Naked Future: What Happens in a World that Anticipates Your Every Move	Predictive analytics
May 3, 2014	Burton Folsom	Kevin Williamson	Uncle Sam Can't Count: A History of Failed Government Investments, from Beaver Pelts to Green Energy	
May 10, 2014	Nomi Prins	Larry Doyle	All the Presidents' Bankers: The Hidden Alliances that Drive American Power	
May 17, 2014	John Paul Stevens	Jeffrey Rosen	Six Amendments: How and Why We Should Change the Constitution	U.S. Constitution
May 24, 2014	Jo Becker	Suzanne Goldberg	Forcing the Spring: Inside the Fight for Marriage Equality	Same-sex marriage in the United States
May 31, 2014	Susan Stranahan	Gregory Jaczko	Fukushima: The Story of a Nuclear Disaster	Fukushima Daiichi nuclear disaster
June 7, 2014	Jeremy Rifkin	Siva Vaidhyanathan	The Zero Marginal Cost Society: The Internet of Things, the Collaborative Commons, and the Eclipse of Capitalism	Internet of Things
June 14, 2014	Ken Adelman	Romesh Ratnesar	Reagan at Reykjavik: The Forty-Eight Hours That Ended the Cold War	Reykjavík Summit, Ronald Reagan, Mikhail Gorbachev
June 21, 2014	Rick Santorum	Tucker Carlson	Blue Collar Conservatives: Recommitting to an America That Works	
June 28, 2014	Kwasi Kwarteng	Toby Harnden	War and Gold: A 500-Year History of Empires, Adventures, and Debt	
July 5, 2014	Matt Kibbe	Tim Carney	Don't Hurt People and Don't Take Their Stuff: A Libertarian Manifesto	Libertarianism in the United States
July 12, 2014	Jason Riley	April Ryan	Please Stop Helping Us: How Liberals Make it Harder for Blacks to Succeed	
July 19, 2014	Jay Barbree	Michael Neufeld	Neil Armstrong: A Life of Flight	Neil Armstrong
July 26, 2014	Chris Tomlinson	Lavar Tomlinson	Tomlinson Hill	Tomlinson Hill, Texas
August 2, 2014	Cheryl Chumley	Theresa Payton	Police State U.S.A.: How Orwell's Nightmare is Becoming Our Reality	
August 9, 2014	John Dean	Bob Woodward	The Nixon Defense: What He Knew and When He Knew It	Richard Nixon, Watergate scandal
August 16, 2014	Daniel Halper	Juan Williams	Clinton, Inc.: The Audacious Rebuilding of a Political Machine	
August 23, 2014	Ben Carson	Chuck Todd	One Nation: What We Can All Do to Save America's Future	
August 30, 2014	William Burrows	Arlin Crotts	The Asteroid Threat: Defending Our Planet from Deadly Near-Earth Objects	Asteroid impact avoidance
September 6, 2014	Mike Gonzalez	Niger Innis	A Race for the Future: How Conservatives Can Break the Liberal Monopoly on Hispanic Americans	Hispanic and Latino Conservatism in the United States
September 13, 2014	Ken Silverstein	Megan McArdle	The Secret World of Oil	Petroleum industry
September 20, 2014	Caleb Scharf	Ingrid Wickelgren	The Copernicus Complex: Our Cosmic Significance in a Universe of Planets and Probabilities	
September 27, 2014	Matt Richtel	Maggie Jackson	A Deadly Wandering: A Tale of Tragedy and Redemption in the Age of Attention	Distracted driving
October 4, 2014	Heather Cox Richardson	Matthew Continetti	To Make Men Free: A History of the Republican Party	Republican Party (United States)
October 11, 2014	Atul Gawande	Marty Makary	Being Mortal: Medicine and What Matters in the End	End-of-life care, Palliative care
October 18, 2014	Jake Halpern	Nomi Prins	Bad Paper: Chasing Debt from Wall Street to the Underworld	Debt buyers
October 25, 2014	Linda Tirado	Tracey Ross	Hand to Mouth: Living in Bootstrap America	Poverty in the United States
November 1, 2014	James McPherson	James Swanson	Embattled Rebel: Jefferson Davis as Commander in Chief	Jefferson Davis
November 8, 2014	Jeff Chang	Marc Lamont Hill	Who We Be: The Colorization of America	Race and ethnicity in the United States
November 15, 2014	Karen Armstrong	Sally Quinn	Fields of Blood: Religion and the History of Violence	
November 22, 2014	Sharyl Attkisson	Nia-Malika Henderson	Stonewalled: My Fight for Truth Against the Forces of Obstruction, Intimidation and Harassment in Obama's Washington	
November 29, 2014	Jonathan Eig	Katha Pollitt	The Birth of the Pill: How Four Crusaders Reinvented Sex and Launched a Revolution	Birth control pill
December 6, 2014	Jason Sokol	Michael Meyers	All Eyes Are Upon Us: Race and Politics from Boston to Brooklyn	
December 13, 2014	Lindsay Mark Lewis	Dave Levinthal	Political Mercenaries: The Inside Story of How Fundraisers Allowed Billionaires to Take Over Politics	
December 20, 2014	William Deresiewicz	Chester Gillis	Excellent Sheep: The Miseducation of the American Elite and the Way to a Meaningful Life	
December 27, 2014	Damon Root	Jenna Greene	Overruled: The Long War for Control of the Supreme Court	
