= Public image of Sarah Palin =

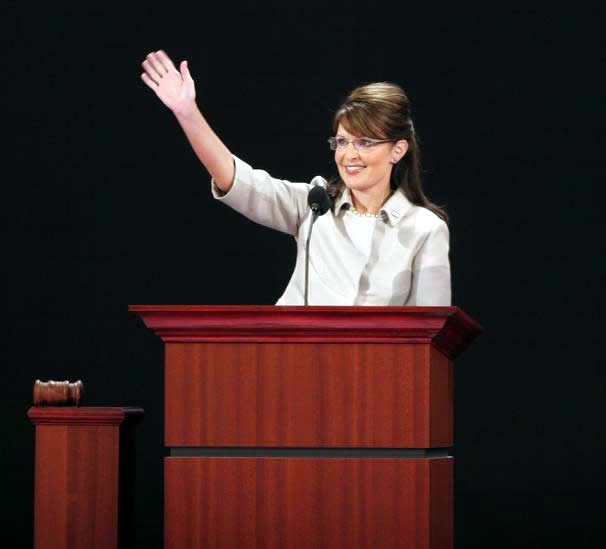
Sarah Palin waves to delegates during her vice-presidential nomination acceptance speech at the 2008 Republican National Convention.

Sarah Palin, while serving as governor of Alaska, was nominated as the first female candidate of the Republican Party for Vice President of the United States. Following the nomination, her public image came under close media scrutiny, particularly regarding her religious perspective on public life, her socially conservative views, and a perceived lack of experience. Palin's experience in foreign and domestic politics came under criticism among conservatives as well as liberals following her nomination. A poll taken by Rasmussen Reports just after the Republican National Convention in the first week of September 2008 found that Palin was more popular than either Barack Obama or John McCain; however, this perception later reversed. At the same time, Palin became more popular among Republicans than McCain. A February 2010 ABC News/Washington Post poll showed 71% of Americans felt Palin lacked the qualifications necessary to be President of the United States.

== Qualifications for higher office ==
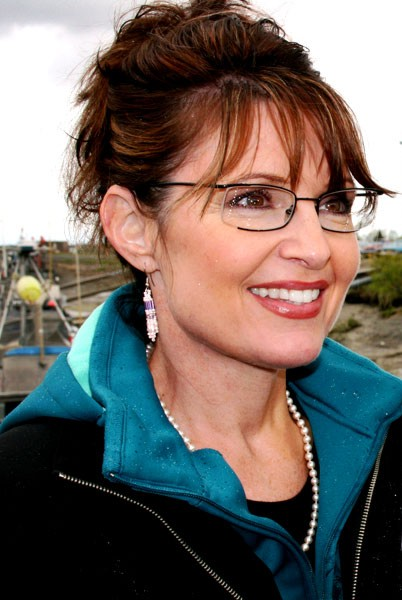
Then-Governor Sarah Palin at the annual blessing of the fishing fleet in Dillingham, Alaska in 2007.

Prior to the Republican National Convention, a Gallup poll found that most voters were unfamiliar with Sarah Palin. 39% said she is ready to serve as president if needed, 33% said she is not, and 29% had no opinion. This was "the lowest vote of confidence in a running mate since the elder George Bush chose then-Indiana senator Dan Quayle to join his ticket in 1988."

Republicans cited her tenure in executive office, high popularity, past focus on ethics and energy issues, her personal life, as well as her command of the Alaska National Guard and Alaska's proximity to foreign countries among reasons for the choice of Sarah Palin.

=== Suitability for Vice President ===
Criticism focused on her limited foreign policy experience and work on major policy issues and claims of low amount of actual responsibility as well as alleged misconduct during her time in office. Her readiness to step in should the president be incapacitated was also questioned.

=== Suitability for President ===
A February 2010 poll for ABC News and The Washington Post showed 71% of Americans felt Palin lacked the qualifications necessary to be President of the United States. In a poll in October 2010, the number dropped to 67%, with 27% seeing her as qualified and with self-described Tea party members split evenly.

=== Foreign policy experience ===
Sarah Palin cited Alaska's proximity to Russia and her dealings with foreign trade delegations as showing her the importance of foreign policy. Palin later agreed that her comments were "mocked" and reiterated her view that this proximity enhanced her foreign policy credentials. Her interviews and particularly her response to explaining the Bush Doctrine as Bush's "worldview" were criticized. Subsequently, a survey found likely voters were divided on whether Palin had the personality and leadership qualities a president should have.

== Impact on the 2008 election ==
After announcing Palin as the presumptive vice-presidential nominee, the McCain campaign received $7 million in contributions in a single day, and the Obama campaign garnered more than $8 million by the next day. During the campaign, Palin evoked a more strongly divided response than Joe Biden among voters and was viewed both more favorably and unfavorably when compared to her opponent. A plurality of the television audience rated Biden's performance higher at the 2008 vice-presidential debate. Following the presidential election, 69% of Republicans felt Palin had helped John McCain's bid, while 20% felt Palin hurt. In the same poll, 71% of Republicans stated Palin had been the right choice.

== Perceptions of Palin's political positions ==
=== Energy and environment ===
Environmental organizations, including the Center for Biological Diversity, the Sierra Club Alaska, and Greenpeace strongly opposed Palin's positions on issues of energy and environment and criticized Palin for her skepticism regarding humans as the cause of global warming and her administration's positions on wildlife, including the attempt to have the federal designation of the polar bear as a threatened species removed. They also criticized Palin's support of oil exploration in the Arctic National Wildlife Refuge.

=== Religion in public life ===
After being nominated, Palin's religious views came under scrutiny from the media. Palin had been involved in Independent Charismatic circles and was a member of an NAR "spiritual warfare network" linked to prophet Cindy Jacobs, through which she was reportedly encouraged to go into politics. A video, filmed at the Wasilla Assemblies of God church, of dominionist New Apostolic Reformation (NAR) preacher Thomas Muthee praying that God would protect Palin from witchcraft was released during the campaign, also leading to critique. Her connection with the NAR led its leaders, particularly figurehead C. Peter Wagner, to see her as a political force for their movements. Wagner later expressed concern that Palin's NAR ties and the media's negative reaction to the Muthee video may have led to the campaign's loss.

Palin spoke to a group of graduating ministry students at her former church, where she urged them to pray "that our leaders, our national leaders, are sending [U.S. soldiers] out on a task that is from God," and in the same remarks asserted that "God's will" was responsible for the Alaskan national gas pipeline project.

Following the Republican National Convention, the McCain campaign told CNN that Palin "doesn't consider herself Pentecostal," raising the possibility for commentators that she might be downplaying her faith. A Rassmussen poll taken after the convention found that Palin was a draw with Catholic voters; the poll found that 54% favored Palin and 42% found her unfavorable, a 12% difference, while Joe Biden was viewed favorably by 49% to 47%.

Republican Jewish Coalition Executive Director Matt Brooks commented: "As governor of Alaska, Palin has enjoyed a strong working relationship with Alaska's Jewish community. She has demonstrated sensitivity to the concerns of the community and has been accessible and responsive." The Republican Jewish Coalition publishes a page on its website debunking what it calls "smears" about Sarah Palin, as well as an endorsement from Governor Linda Lingle, Hawaii's first Jewish and first female governor.

=== Women's issues ===
On September 16, 2008, the National Organization for Women (NOW) gave its endorsement in the presidential race to Democratic candidate Barack Obama and his running mate Joe Biden. The Independent of London reported: "The feminist organisation almost never supports a presidential candidate, but the Alaska governor's Christian fundamentalist faith and her opposition to abortion rights has forced its hand." Gandy explained, "as the chair of NOW's Political Action Committee, I am frequently asked whether NOW supports women candidates just because they are women. This gives me an opportunity to once again answer that question with an emphatic 'No.' We recognize the importance of having women's rights supporters at every level but, like Sarah Palin, not every woman supports women's rights." The conservative magazine The Weekly Standard responded asserting "the old-fashioned feminists have fallen back on the old theme of false consciousness; that women who don't agree with them aren't really women at all."

==== Teen pregnancy ====
According to a blog published by the Christian Broadcasting Network, Palin retained the support of Evangelicals following her daughter's conception of a child outside of wedlock: "First they hear that Sarah Palin chooses the life option even though she had a Down Syndrome baby and once again the family (and Bristol) has chosen the life option in this recent case... Will there be some turned off by the whole pre-marital sex thing? Of course but this type of story doesn't sink her at all with Evangelicals." Evangelical leader Richard Land said of Palin's seventeen-year-old daughter's pregnancy, "Those who criticize the Palin family don't understand that we don't see babies as a punishment but as a blessing."

Bill O'Reilly expressed support for Palin: "As long as society doesn't have to support the mother, father or baby, it is a personal matter."

==== Hillary Clinton ====
"Hillary is missing in action from the Palin-hating brigade," opined a writer for The Weekly Standard. Former Democratic presidential candidate Hillary Clinton referred to Palin's VP nomination as "historic," stating, "We should all be proud of Governor Sarah Palin's historic nomination, and I congratulate her and Senator McCain.... While their policies would take America in the wrong direction, Governor Palin will add an important new voice to the debate." Wisconsin Congresswoman Tammy Baldwin expressed a different view: "To the extent that this choice represents an effort to court supporters of Hillary Clinton's historic candidacy, McCain misjudges the reasons so many voters rallied around her candidacy. It was Senator Clinton's experience, skill and commitment to change, especially in the areas of health care and energy policy, that drew such strong support. Sarah Palin's opposition to Roe v. Wade and her support of big oil will not draw Democrats from the Obama-Biden ticket." The president of NOW, Kim Gandy, said: "What McCain does not understand is that women supported Hillary Clinton not just because she was a woman, but because she was a champion on their issues. They will surely not find Sarah Palin to be an advocate for women."

Palin and Clinton were compared and contrasted with one another in the media. A New York Times article explained: "Mrs. Clinton and Ms. Palin have little in common beyond their breakout performances at the conventions and the soap opera aspects of their family lives. Mrs. Clinton always faces high expectations; Ms. Palin faced low expectations this week, and benefited from them. Mrs. Clinton can seem harsh when she goes on the attack; Ms. Palin has shown a knack for attacking without seeming nasty. Mrs. Clinton has a lot of experience; Ms. Palin, not so much. Mrs. Clinton is pantsuits; Ms. Palin is skirts." Guy Cecil, the former political director of Mrs. Clinton's campaign, said it was "insulting" for Republicans to compare Ms. Palin to Mrs. Clinton." The Saturday Night Live skit "A Nonpartisan Message from Governor Sarah Palin & Senator Hillary Clinton" counterpoised Palin, played by Tina Fey, against Hillary Clinton, played by Amy Poehler. The skit pointed out their opposing political views and presented Palin as unversed in global politics, as emphasized by the line: "I can see Russia from my house." Ex-Hewlett-Packard chief executive and former McCain advisor Carly Fiorina blasted the Saturday Night Live sketch in a television interview: "They were defining Hillary Clinton as very substantive and Sarah Palin as totally superficial," and an ABC news blog headline soon after ran, "Now the McCain Campaign's Complaining that Saturday Night Live Skit Was 'Sexist'."

=== Guns ===
In a September 2008 article, Chad Baus the vice chairman of the Buckeye Firearms Association comments: "Unlike Mitt Romney and John Kerry, Palin is a life-long NRA member and big animal hunter.... In seeking to assuage the concerns of gun owners about his spotty record on guns and rally them to the polls, John McCain couldn't have made a better choice." In its brief, "Sarah Palin and Joe Biden: Worlds Apart," the NRA Institute for Legislative Action says nothing specific about Palin's position on gun legislation but concludes: "Gov. Sarah Palin would be one of the most pro-gun vice-presidents in American history."

=== Health care ===
On August 7, 2009, Palin released a statement on her Facebook page in which she said: "The America I know and love is not one in which my parents or my baby with Down syndrome will have to stand in front of Obama's 'death panel' so his bureaucrats can decide, based on a subjective judgment of their 'level of productivity in society,' whether they are worthy of health care." The Associated Press reported: "Palin and other critics are wrong." The provision of the health care bill to which Palin referred (on page 425) merely authorizes Medicare reimbursement for physicians who provide voluntary counseling about such subjects as living wills. Howard Dean, the former Chair of the Democratic National Committee, said that Palin "just made that up. Just like the 'Bridge to Nowhere' that she supposedly didn't support." Republicans were divided. Former Speaker of the United States House of Representatives Newt Gingrich agreed with Palin, saying that "there are clearly people in America who believe in establishing euthanasia, including selective standards." Palin's "death panels" comment was selected as the "Lie of the Year" by PolitiFact.com, the fact-checking website of the St. Petersburg Times. Palin was also criticized for having invoked her infant for political purposes.

The ideas for Palin's death panel meme came from the editorial Deadly Doctors, which was written by Betsy McCaughey and published by the New York Post. Palin cited a speech Michele Bachmann gave about the editorial regarding President Barack Obama's health care advisor Dr. Ezekiel Emanuel, which contained what TIME called "selective and misleading quotes" from Emanuel's writings. While Rush Limbaugh called death panels "the reality of what's going to happen" TIME and ABC described her remarks as false euthanasia claims.

Palin said recommendations that women wait longer to be screened for breast and cervical cancer indicate "rationed care." The guideline from the American College of Obstetricians and Gynecologists on pap smears was begun before Obama was elected. The change in guidelines for mammograms was suggested by the U.S. Preventive Services Task Force, which, according to Kathleen Sebelius, does not set government policy. It also is not related to cost controls, according to members of the task force.

== Perceptions of Palin's political style ==
=== Approach to campaigning ===
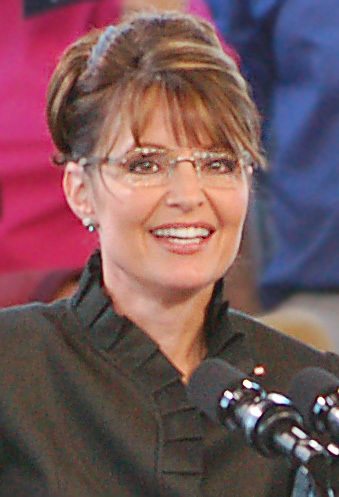
Sarah Palin in Carson City, Nevada on September 13, 2008.

Palin was early on accused of dissimulation in her approach to campaigning during the 2008 elections. An Associated Press journalist reported: "Day after day she said she had told Congress 'no thanks' to the so-called Bridge to Nowhere, a rural Alaska project that was abandoned when critics challenged its costs and usefulness. For nearly a week, major news outlets had documented that Palin supported the bridge when running for governor in 2006, noting that she turned against it only after it became an object of ridicule in Alaska and a symbol of Congress's out-of-control earmarking... (The campaign) equated lawmakers' requests for money for special projects with corruption, even though Palin has sought millions of dollars in such 'earmarks' this year. The Washington Post reported that "critics, the news media and nonpartisan fact checkers have called [Palin's claim] a fabrication or, at best, a half-truth."

Palin compared herself to Harry Truman, the vice-president who succeeded Franklin D. Roosevelt, contributing to the impression that for a time the race was between Palin and Obama. Indeed, for many Palin was the main attraction at McCain-Palin rallies; there were often "a sizable number of people making their way towards the exit" after Palin left the podium.

After the McCain-Palin ticket lost the elections, media coverage focused on rumors of infighting within the McCain campaign, reporting that campaign staffers stated Palin had refused preparation for her interview with Katie Couric, was at times emotionally intractable, could not list the three members of the North American Free Trade Agreement (NAFTA) and was unaware that Africa is a continent rather than a country, had scheduled an interview with French President Nicolas Sarkozy which turned out to be a radio station prank, spent far more than the reported amount on her campaign wardrobe, and asked to make her own concession speech on election night. Although Palin disputed the accusations as "foolish," she said she bears no ill will towards the McCain staff who anonymously leaked the accusations to the press. Ultimately the press emphasized Palin's statement that she was sorry if she had cost McCain a single vote.

==== Campaign imagery ====
2010 congressional election campaign poster

In March 2010, Palin posted to her Facebook page to seek contributions to SarahPAC to help defeat 20 House Democrats in the 2010 congressional election. Her post featured a graphic that used gunsight crosshairs to mark the Democrats' districts. She also tweeted to her supporters, "'Don't Retreat, Instead – RELOAD!' Pls see my Facebook page." Palin critics said she was inciting violence. One of the targeted Democrats, Representative Gabrielle Giffords of Arizona, objected to the graphic, saying, "we're in the crosshairs of a gun sight over our district. When people do that, they've got to realize that there are consequences to that action." Palin referred to the targets as "a bullseye icon" in a post-election tweet.

In the immediate aftermath of the 2011 Tucson shooting, where Giffords was among those who were shot, Palin was the subject of press and political criticism about her style of political rhetoric, which was disputed by defenders of Palin in the media. Palin removed the controversial graphic from her website, but later restored it. On Glenn Beck, an e-mail said to be from Palin was read, saying "I hate violence. I hate war. Our children will not have peace if politicos just capitalize on this to succeed in portraying anyone as inciting terror and violence." Following the 2011 Tucson shooting, a Palin aide stated that death threats against the former Alaska governor had risen to "an unprecedented level." As more details of the shooting emerged, The Christian Science Monitor reported: "The suggestion that the shooting of Rep. Gabrielle Giffords Saturday might have been influenced by political 'vitriol' seems less likely as more becomes known about suspect Jared Loughner." Palin released a video denying any link between her rhetoric and the shooting, controversially referring to such suggestions as a blood libel, also saying that, "Acts of monstrous criminality stand on their own. They begin and end with the criminals who commit them."

A public opinion survey commissioned by USA Today and conducted by Gallup January 14–16, 2011, showed that Palin was perceived favorably by 38% of those polled and unfavorably by 53%, the highest unfavorable rating since Palin entered national politics.

=== Approach to governance ===
Palin came under fire in congress and the media as a result of her support for the Gravina Island Bridge "Bridge to Nowhere," often called an emblem of pork-barrel spending and excessive earmark requests.

Some media outlets repeated Palin's statement that she "stood up to Big Oil" when she resigned after just 11 months as the head of the Alaska Oil and Gas Conservation Commission because of abuses she witnessed involving other Republican commissioners and their ties to energy companies and energy lobbyists, and again when she raised taxes on oil companies as governor; in turn others said that she is a "friend of Big Oil" due to her fervent advocacy of oil exploitation, including her push to open the Arctic National Wildlife Refuge to drilling and effort to de-list polar bears as an Endangered species since this could hinder oil speculation.

Similarly, some called Palin a "small-town foe of 'good old boys' politics and a champion for ethics reform," as evidenced by her run-ins with Ted Stevens, while others argued that Palin's record "undermined arguments that Palin has broken from Alaska's Republican machine, including Stevens." Still others point to nepotistic hiring tendencies and question her firing policies. Controversy arose concerning Palin's dismissal of the Wasilla police chief at the start of her first term as mayor, and her firing of the public commissioner while governor of Alaska (what the media referred to as "troopergate").

In an article entitled "State leaders question Palin's qualifications," the Juneau Empire, one of Alaska's main papers, reported that as governor, Palin was so frequently absent from work at the state capitol that, "someone at the Capitol even printed up buttons asking, 'Where's Sarah?'"; the article quoted Rep. Andrea Doll, D-Juneau, "At a time when her leadership was truly needed, we didn't know where she was."

=== Approval rating as Governor ===
As governor of Alaska, Palin's job approval rating ranged from a high of 93% in May 2007 to 54% in May 2009. In November 2006, the month before Palin took office, Alaska Governor Frank Murkowski's job approval rating was 19%.

Date	Approval	Disapproval	Pollster
May 15, 2007	93%	Not reported	Dittman Research
May 30, 2007	89%	Not reported	Ivan Moore Research
October 19–21, 2007	83%	11%	Ivan Moore Research
April 10, 2008	73%	7%	Rasmussen Reports
May 17, 2008	69%	9%	Rasmussen Reports
July 24–25, 2008	80%	Not reported	Hays Research Group
July 30, 2008	64%	14%	Rasmussen Reports
September 20–22, 2008	68%	Not reported	Ivan Moore Research
October 7, 2008	63%	37%	Rasmussen Reports
March 24–25, 2009	59.8%	34.9%	Hays Research
May 4–5, 2009	54%	41.6%	Hays Research
June 14–18, 2009	56%	35%	Global Strategy Group

In April 2009, SurveyUSA reported job approval ratings for the following U.S. governors: Bob Riley (AL) 54%, Arnold Schwarzenegger (CA) 25%, Chet Culver (IA) 42%, Kathleen Sebelius (KS) 46%, Steve Beshear (KY) 47%, Tim Pawlenty (MN) 46%, Jay Nixon (MO) 56%, Bill Richardson (NM) 46%, David Paterson (NY) 25%, Ted Kulongoski (OR) 40%, Tim Kaine (VA) 50%, Christine Gregoire (WA) 40%, and Jim Doyle (WI) 35%. (Polls taken April 24–26, 2009).

== Persona ==
Soon after the 2008 Republican National Convention, Palin quickly became a favorite subject of satire and derision. According to Lara Spencer, host of the tabloid show The Insider, Palin was part of a big cross-over between politics and pop culture in the 2008 election. During the campaign Spencer conducted the only live broadcast interview with Palin's husband, Todd Palin.

Palin's status as a mother of a child with Down syndrome was initially a focus for some pundits and reporters during her national emergence in 2008. CNN's John Roberts pondered: "Children with Down's syndrome require an awful lot of attention. The role of vice president, it seems to me, would take up an awful lot of her time, and it raises the issue of how much time will she have to dedicate to her newborn child?"

William Kristol of The Weekly Standard wrote: "There she is: a working woman who's a proud wife and mother; a traditionalist in important matters who's broken through all kinds of barriers; a reformer who's a Republican; a challenger of a corrupt good-old-boy establishment who's a conservative; a successful woman whose life is unapologetically grounded in religious belief; a lady who's a leader."

=== Appearance ===
A great deal of attention was paid to Palin's physical appearance during the 2008 election. According to Vogue magazine, "Besides being telegenic, [Palin] had a tough-girl Alaskan résumé that most politicians could only dream of—the protein her family eats comes from fish she has pulled out of the ocean with her own hands and caribou she has shot." Others were quick to point out striking resemblances of Palin to actress Tina Fey, who would impersonate her on Saturday Night Live, and Peggy Hill, a character on Fox Network's cartoon series King of the Hill. Regarding her appearance, Palin has said, "I've been taken aback by the nasty criticism about my appearance. I wish they'd stick with the issues instead of discussing my black go-go boots. A reporter once asked me about it during the campaign, and I assured him I was trying to be as frumpy as I could by wearing my hair on top of my head and these schoolmarm glasses."

According to the Los Angeles Times of October 23, 2008, "the news that the Republican National Committee has bought Alaska Gov. Sarah Palin and her family nearly $150,000 worth of clothing since September has fueled charges of hypocrisy by her detractors and sparked questions about the legality of the expenditures". It reported that "Election-law experts are split on whether the RNC's expenditure is allowable under federal laws, which prohibit the use of campaign funds for personal use." Tracey Schmitt, Palin's traveling press secretary, responded by saying "It was always the intent that the clothing go to a charitable purpose after the campaign." "I am an Obama supporter, but when I heard that for $150,000, they dressed her, her children and her husband, I thought, 'that's not much'," said Vicki Sanchez, a costume designer who dressed Geena Davis as the first female U.S. president on the short-lived TV show Commander in Chief." She continues on to say "When you start buying $3,000 suits, boots that cost anywhere from $800 and up, and designer shoes, which cost $500 at least, it goes fast."

=== Oration ===
A profile in The New Yorker described Palin's oratorical style as "simultaneously chatty and urgent," and noted that "she reinforces her words with winks and nods and wrinklings of her nose that seem meant to telegraph intimacy and ease." The article's author, Philip Gourevitch, characterized Palin as being "high-spirited, irrepressible, and not in the least self-conscious."

Features of the Minnesotan dialect are prominent in the Mat-Su Valley where Palin grew up because the area was settled by farmers from Minnesota during the Great Depression. Palin's dialect is Upper Midwestern, and she speaks with a characteristic North Central American English dialect. Her dialect is often tied in with her persona, and often reinforces her "folksy" image.

=== "Refudiate" ===
In July 2010, amidst the Cordoba House controversy, Palin on Twitter asked Muslims to "pls refudiate" support for the mosque. She was then mocked by bloggers and media outlets for using "refudiate," which is not a word. Palin later responded on Twitter, saying that "English is a living language." and "Shakespeare liked to coin new words too." According to Michael Shear of The New York Times, the record suggests the original Twitter message was no typo. Just days earlier in a Fox News appearance, Palin had combined "refute" and "repudiate" into "refudiate." The word was chosen as new word of the year for 2010 by the New Oxford American Dictionary, with the statement "From a strictly lexical interpretation of the different contexts in which Palin has used 'refudiate,' we have concluded that neither 'refute' nor 'repudiate' seems consistently precise, and that 'refudiate' more or less stands on its own, suggesting a general sense of 'reject.'"

=== Palin's children ===
In June 2009, David Letterman told a joke that Sarah Palin's daughter was "knocked up" by a baseball player during a Yankees game. Palin then issued a public statement condemning Letterman's joke. A campaign then began to have David Letterman fired or to force him to apologize for his actions, with several Republicans organizing a boycott of Letterman sponsors. On June 16, Sarah Palin accepted Letterman's apology. In June 2009, Palin responded to a blogger for posting a photo in which her son Trig's face was altered, calling the change "malicious." The image superimposed was of a local Alaskan right-wing radio show host and was implying that he was her "baby" regarding his positive coverage of her governorship foibles.

=== Palin and the media ===
In July 2009, Palin threatened to sue any media outlet that printed rumors that she was being investigated by the FBI on corruption charges involving inappropriate contracts. The head of the FBI in Alaska said that she was not being investigated. Some reports stated that the statute of limitations on the contract incident would have passed. She also criticized the media in an op-ed in The Washington Post in which she said "many in the media would rather focus on the personality-driven political gossip of the day than on the gravity of these Cap and Trade challenges. So, at risk of disappointing the chattering class, let me make clear what is foremost on my mind and where my focus will be."

Palin herself, the Los Angeles Times, and other commentators have accused Newsweek of sexism for their choice of cover in the November 2009 issue discussing Palin's book, Going Rogue: An American Life. The cover depicted her posing in gym-clothes and was captioned "How do you solve a problem like Sarah." "It's sexist as hell," wrote Lisa Richardson for the LA Times. Taylor Marsh of The Huffington Post called it "the worst case of pictorial sexism aimed at political character assassination ever done by a traditional media outlet." David Brody of CBN News stated: "This cover should be insulting to women politicians." The cover came from a photo of Palin used in the August 2009 issue of Runner's World.

In March 2010, Palin starred on a travelogue reality television series on the Discovery Channel called Sarah Palin's Alaska, produced by Mark Burnett. A Palin series on Fox News called Real American Stories generated some controversy since several of the guests shown "interviewed" by her claimed to have never met her: L.L. Cool J and Toby Keith both complained that footage taken from an interview with someone else was recycled for this.

=== Paul Revere remarks ===
During a 2011 bus tour, titled "One Nation," across the Northeastern states and paid for by her PAC, Palin visited the Paul Revere House in Boston. When asked what she had learned during her visit, Palin replied with a comment to the effect that Paul Revere had warned the British that Americans would not let them confiscate American arms, and that Revere's warnings involved ringing bells and firing guns.

He who warned, uh, the British that they weren't gonna be takin' away our arms, uh, by ringing those bells, and um, makin' sure as he's riding his horse through town to send those warning shots and bells that we were going to be sure and we were going to be free, and we were going to be armed.

— Sarah Palin, Los Angeles Times

The remark was widely seen as a gaffe and not accepted by the news media, but she declined to withdraw her assertion. Historian Brendan McConville stated that Palin's account was "essentially right" and Cornell law professor William Jacobson said Palin's critics are the ones in need of a history lesson. "It seems to be a historical fact that this happened, A lot of the criticism is unfair and made by people who are themselves ignorant of history." On the other hand, Revere biographer James Giblin disagreed with some of Palin's remarks, characterizing her comment about warning the British as a "blooper." A director from the Paul Revere House also disagreed with historical descriptions made by Palin. Robert Allison, the chair of the history department at Suffolk University, commented in an interview with NPR that Revere did not personally ring bells nor were gunshots involved, but he did ride as part of the militia warning system, intending the ringing of church bells as a sign of American solidarity and a warning to the British not to impound the colonists' weapons. Allison said that Palin was correct on the whole.

== Parodies ==
Palin became a subject of parody and satire soon after her nomination for vice president on the Republican Party ticket for the 2008 presidential election.

=== 2008 presidential election ===
==== Immediate comic reaction ====
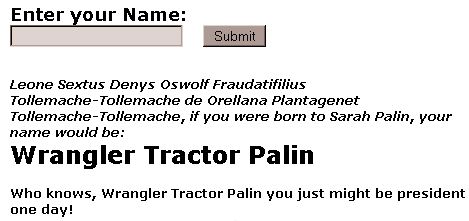
A putative Palinesque name is generated for Leone Sextus Tollemache.

A Comedy Central writer joked that "she's a pit bull who wears lipstick for some reason!" (in response to her statement at the 2008 Republican National Convention that the difference between a pit bull and a hockey mom was lipstick). In addition, David Harrington's "Sarah Palin Baby Name Generator" generates hunting, industrial, hockey-related, and other idiosyncratic personal names from names that are supplied to it.

Also, comedian Julie Brown re-wrote her 1980s single "The Homecoming Queen's Got a Gun" as a parody titled "The Ex-Beauty Queen's Got a Gun." Some street art in New York City also parodied Palin before the 2008 election, including one employing Shepard Fairey's Barack Obama "Hope" poster.

==== Tina Fey and Saturday Night Live ====
Tina Fey as Sarah Palin (left) and Amy Poehler as Hillary Clinton (right)

On September 13, 2008, Tina Fey appeared in a comedy skit, "A Nonpartisan Message from Governor Sarah Palin & Senator Hillary Clinton," on Saturday Night Live as Sarah Palin, alongside Amy Poehler as Hillary Clinton. The sketch was written by Poehler, Fey, and head writer and Weekend Update anchor Seth Meyers. The following year Fey won an Emmy in the category of Outstanding Guest Actress in a Comedy Series for her impersonation of Palin.

Due to its popularity, additional sketches with Tina Fey as Sarah Palin were seen in later SNL episodes leading up to the weekend before the election, with Fey ultimately performing her impersonation alongside both the real Palin and John McCain. Palin has said that, before her national prominence, she once dressed up as Fey on Halloween. Palin herself has appeared several times on Saturday Night Live or its primetime specials; a couple skits have featured guest stars mistaking Palin for Fey.

==== Nicole Parker and MADtv ====
On September 27, 2008, Nicole Parker portrayed Sarah Palin during a mock Q&A session in a live audience. On October 4, 2008 MADtv aired a Special Election Presidential Special where it featured Parker once again appearing as Palin.

==== Gina Gershon ====
Actress Gina Gershon self-produced and posted several parody videos in which she portrays Palin for the comedy website Funny or Die. In one of the videos, Gershon, as Palin, dons a stars-and-stripes bikini and totes a gun, a reference to a widely circulated, but faked, photograph purporting to be the real Palin in such a scenario.

==== Live with Regis and Kelly ====
Kelly Ripa impersonated Palin on the Halloween edition of Live with Regis and Kelly (broadcast October 31, 2008), parodying phrases associated with Palin such a "Say it ain't so, Joe" and "Maverick," wearing Palin's well-known red outfit, and speaking in Palin's accent. Her co-host, Regis Philbin, impersonated Joe Biden.

==== Caribou Barbie ====
Following her nomination, Palin was often tagged with the epithet "Caribou Barbie," a play on Malibu Barbie, owing to her background as a beauty pageant contestant in her home state of Alaska. Palin herself uttered this phrase when she made an October 18, 2008, guest appearance on Saturday Night Live, filling in the blank for Alec Baldwin, who "could not remember what people called her". Baldwin later referred to Palin as "Bible Spice" in an appearance on the Late Show with David Letterman. The epithet Caribou Barbie has been contrasted with Palin's usage of mama grizzly to describe herself and later to describe other moms seeking political office.

=== Post-resignation ===
==== William Shatner ====
In addition to his career on Star Trek, actor William Shatner is also known for his spoken word performances. On July 27, 2009, Shatner gave a "spoken word" interpretation of Palin's farewell address on The Tonight Show with Conan O'Brien. He returned to the Tonight Show on July 29, 2009, and performed a few of Palin's "Tweets" on Twitter. Shatner then appeared on the show on December 11, 2009, to recite Palin's Going Rogue: An American Life, but was followed by an appearance from Palin herself reading excerpts from Shatner's autobiography, Up Till Now.

==== An American Nightmare versus An American Life ====
Going Rouge: Sarah Palin, An American Nightmare is a collection of essays about Palin with a spoof title and cover design similar to Palin's memoir. The paperback was released on November 17, 2009, the same day that Palin's own hardback Going Rogue: An American Life was released. Both books feature Palin on the front in red, but Going Rouge: An American Nightmare has her against a backdrop of black thunder clouds and lightning, instead of the blue sky with clouds of her actual memoir. Going Rouge is compiled by Richard Kim and Betsy Reed, two editors of the left-leaning weekly The Nation, and includes essays by Katrina vanden Heuvel, Naomi Klein, Katha Pollitt and others.

==== Iron Sky ====
The 2012 movie Iron Sky casts Stephanie Paul as the President of the United States as parody of Sarah Palin.

== Other appearances in the media ==
In 2016, Palin appeared as a panelist on the revival of the classic game show Match Game hosted by Alec Baldwin.

In 2020, Palin competed on season 3 of The Masked Singer as the Bear, where she sang "Baby Got Back" by Sir Mix-a-Lot. She was eliminated on her first appearance.

== Palin as an inspiration for fictional characters ==
Actor Zach Galifianakis cited Palin's handling of her overnight elevation to national prominence in 2008 as a source of inspiration for his portrayal of the character Marty Huggins in the 2012 comedy film The Campaign. In the film, Huggins is a politically inexperienced candidate. Former McCain campaign staffer Nicolle Wallace cited Palin as the inspiration for her depiction of a mentally ill vice president in her 2011 novel It's Classified. Wallace had worked directly with Palin during the 2008 campaign, with the two being odds both during and after the campaign. In 2020, Michael Schur, co-creator of the television series Parks and Recreation, revealed that Palin's role in the construction of the Curtis D. Menard Memorial Sports Center while mayor of Wasilla had inspired a plot point in the series in which the character Ben Wyatt had previously (as a teenage mayor of a small town) bankrupted his hometown's finances by funding a planned ice rink complex called "Ice Town". Actress Lucy Punch cited Palin as the inspiration for her portrayal of the supporter character Amy Squirrel in the 2011 comedy film Bad Teacher, remarking that she portrayed her character as behaving like a younger cousin of Palin who is employed as an elementary school teacher. Palin is also speculated to have been a likely inspiration for the character Laura Pickler, portrayed by actress Jennifer Garner in the 2011 comedy film Butter.

During the run of the comedy series Veep, comparisons were made between its lead character Selina Meyer and the real life careers of prominent women in American politics, including Palin, Hillary Clinton, and Nancy Pelosi. Actress Julia Louis-Dreyfus (who portrayed Meyer), however, denied that the character was meant to serve as a parody of Palin, "any other female politician", or "any one specific person". Creator Armando Iannucci has similarly denied that the character was modeled upon Palin or any specific individual. Analysis of the series has noted that its early writing and conceptualization was responsive to the then-current political atmosphere surrounding female aspirants to the White House, in which Palin's vice presidential candidacy (recent at the time the show was conceived) and subsequent public interest in Palin was a significant factor. Palin was cited by some of the show's costume designers as a source of inspiration for some of the outfits worn by the character during the first season. However, lead costume designer Ernesto Martinez noted that Louis–Dreyfus was resistant to the use of Palin and fellow Republican politician Michele Bachmann as wardrobe inspirations, which led the costume designers to instead favor Michelle Obama (the then-current first lady) as their most significant reference point for Meyer's wardrobe that season.
