= The Masked Avengers' prank on Sarah Palin =

Prank by Quebecer radio comedy duo on American vice-presidential candidate Sarah Palin

On November 1, 2008, American vice-presidential candidate Sarah Palin fell victim to a prank call by the Masked Avengers, a Quebecer radio comedy duo, who tricked Palin into believing she was talking to French President Nicolas Sarkozy. During the conversation, the fake Sarkozy, speaking in English (the real Sarkozy does not speak English), talked to Palin about foreign policy, hunting, and the 2008 U.S. presidential election. After it was revealed to Palin that the call was a prank, she handed the phone to one of her assistants who told the comedy duo "I will find you" and hung up.

Both the McCain and Obama campaigns released light-hearted statements about the prank. However, a McCain campaign advisor said that behind the scenes, aides and advisors to the campaign were not happy that the pranksters were able to lie their way up to Palin, or with the publicity Palin received because of the call.

== Background ==
"The Masked Avengers" are disc jockeys and comedians Sébastien Trudel and Marc-Antoine Audette, a Canadian radio duo from Montreal, Quebec radio station CKOI-FM, who have become notorious for making prank calls to celebrities, such as business mogul Bill Gates, golfer Tiger Woods, singer Britney Spears, and French president Nicolas Sarkozy.

Sarah Palin was the Republican governor of Alaska. On August 29, 2008, John McCain announced that she would be his running mate in the 2008 presidential election against Democrats Barack Obama and Joe Biden. Critics of Palin voiced their concern over what they saw as her lack of foreign policy experience, especially after an interview with Katie Couric of the CBS Evening News where Palin was criticized by many for her answer to a question about her "foreign policy credentials".

== Preparation ==
Marc-Antoine Audette said that it took the duo about four or five days of calls to Palin's staff to finally be able to talk to her. They claimed that they started by talking to low-level people in Alaska and made their way up through Palin's campaign staff. Audette said that at first they didn't think their prank would work, calling it a "mission impossible". He claimed that "after about a dozen calls", the duo "started to realize it [the prank call] might work, because her [Sarah Palin's] staff didn't know the name of the French President. They asked us to spell it." Audette and Trudel credited their ability to make their way up through Palin's staff to sounding convincing during the first few calls, always arranging to place the call at a set time, and not leaving a contact number. The four days of calls needed to talk to Palin was quicker compared to some of their other pranks. Audette and Trudel said that it took them two months to talk to Paul McCartney and one to talk to Bill Gates, but only two days to prank Britney Spears.

== Conversation ==
Finally, on November 1, the Masked Avengers were able to talk to Palin. The call began with Trudel, who claimed to be an aide to Sarkozy named Franck Louvrier, talking to an assistant to Palin who identifies herself as "Lexi". Lexi puts Palin on the line, who says "hello" only to realize that Trudel is still on the other line. Trudel tells Palin to hold on for a moment while he gives the phone to Sarkozy, who is really Audette. Palin can be heard talking to someone in the room about when to hand Palin the phone. Audette then begins to speak and a somewhat extended conversation ensues.

After Audette reveals that the call was a prank by CKOI in Montreal, Palin leaves the phone and can be heard in the background telling her aides that the call was "just a radio station prank". Audette is still on the line and jokes that "if one voice can change the world for Obama, one Viagra can change the world for McCain." One of Palin's assistants picks up the phone and says "I’m sorry, I have to let you go. Thank you."

== Reaction ==
In an e-mail, Palin spokeswoman Tracey Schmitt wrote that "Governor Palin was mildly amused to learn that she had joined the ranks of heads of state, including President Sarkozy, and other celebrities in being targeted by these pranksters. C'est la vie." When asked by reporters about the conversation, Palin said that she would "keep a sense of humor through all of this, just as we [the McCain campaign] did with SNL [parodies of her], too." She added that "you've got to have some levity in all this."

Barack Obama senior advisor Robert Gibbs jokingly said in an interview that "I'm glad we [the Obama campaign] check out our calls before we hand the phone to Barack Obama."

The Masked Avengers received a sudden burst of fame from the prank. They gave more than 300 interviews about the conversation, and were even flown to New York City by CBS to appear on The Early Show. In an interview, Marc-Antoine Audette and Sébastien Trudel said that they found it "pretty disturbing to see that idiots like us can go through to a vice-presidential candidate", and claimed that they were just "two stupid comedians with a bad French accent." The Masked Avengers also admitted that the call was "probably the biggest [prank] we've ever done."

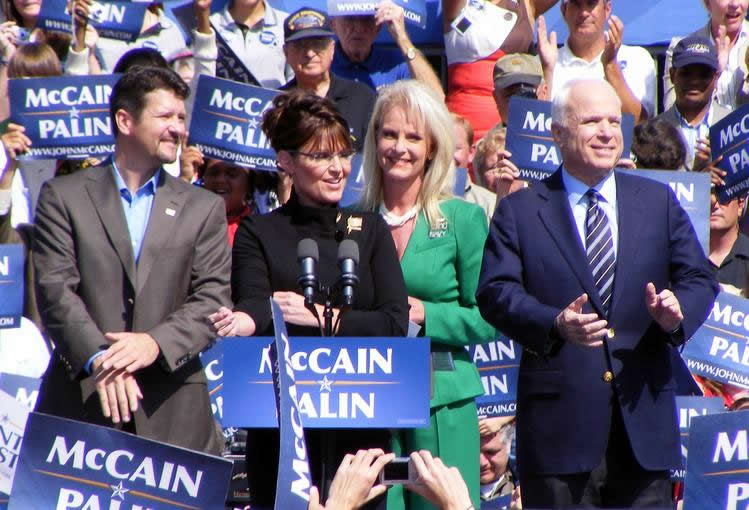
The prank allegedly caused friction between Sarah Palin and John McCain.

When recalling the experience, Audette said that "once we [Audette and Trudel] started making jokes, she didn't seem to mind, and she didn't seem to be aware of the fact we were making jokes", which according to Audette was when "we were like 'Oh my God this [call] is gonna be long'". The duo also said that they weren't trying to make any political statements with the call, they just like to take high-profile people to task.

== Impact ==
After McCain and Palin were defeated in the general election, a Republican campaign advisor told The New York Times that the McCain campaign was not happy about the prank, which caused friction between McCain and Palin. McCain and his advisors were allegedly upset that Palin did not tell them beforehand that she planned to speak with who she thought was Nicolas Sarkozy. McCain strategist Steve Schmidt called a meeting and demanded to know who let Palin talk to the fake Sarkozy without checking with senior advisors first. Steve Biegun, one of Palin's aides admitting to vetting the call without speaking to campaign advisors or the U.S. State Department, told the Los Angeles Times that "No one's going to beat me up more than I beat myself up for setting up the governor like that."

== See also ==
- Parodies of Sarah Palin
- Saturday Night Live parodies of Sarah Palin
