= Olivia Dalton =

American political aide (born 1984)

Olivia Alair Dalton
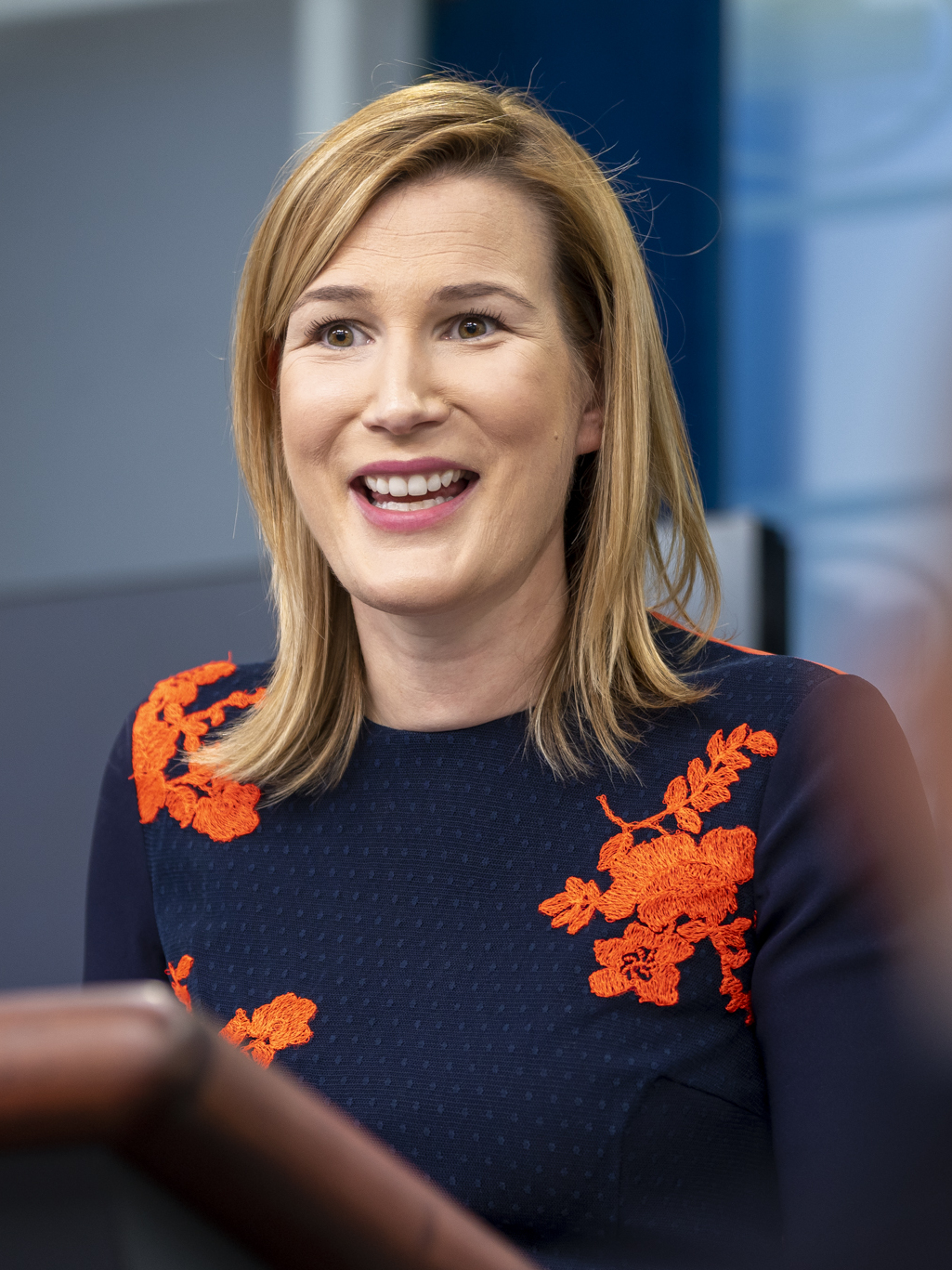
- Dalton in June 2023

White House Principal Deputy Press Secretary
- In office September 2022 – March 13, 2024
- President: Joe Biden
- Secretary: Karine Jean-Pierre
- Preceded by: Karine Jean-Pierre
- Succeeded by: Andrew Bates (Senior Deputy)

Personal details
- Born: October 31, 1984 (age 42) Connecticut, U.S.
- Party: Democratic
- Education: Georgetown University (BA)

Olivia Alair Dalton (born October 31, 1984) is an American political aide who served as the White House Principal Deputy Press Secretary for the Joe Biden administration. Prior to Biden's presidency, Dalton served as a press secretary (both in full-time and deputy positions) during the Obama administration.

== Early life and education ==
Dalton attended Georgetown University where in 2019, she was an all Fellow at the McCourt School's Institute of Politics and Public Service. She earned a bachelor's degree in Government and History.

== Political career ==
While attending Georgetown, Dalton interned for Connecticut Representative Rosa DeLauro. She also worked in the nonprofit organization Advocates for Youth and the Democratic National Convention. In August 2006 she became acting deputy press secretary for Delaware Senator Joe Biden until July 2008 when Biden became Barack Obama's running mate for the 2008 presidential election.

Dalton next worked in the Ohio office as Regional Communications Director for Barack Obama's 2008 presidential campaign from August to November 2008. The following year, Dalton served as a deputy press secretary from April to November 2009. She became press secretary from 2009 to 2011. During Obama's re-election campaign, Dalton served from 2011 to 2012 as the press secretary to First Lady Michelle Obama. Between 2013 and 2015, Dalton worked as a press secretary in the United States Department of Transportation.

After Joe Biden's successful 2020 presidential election, Dalton served as Communications Director for the Confirmations Team. Between September and December 2021, Dalton served on the U.S. National Security Council as a senior advisor in Operation Allies Welcome. From January 2021 to September 2022, Dalton worked as the Spokesperson & Communications Director to the U.S. Mission to the United Nations. On August 25, 2022, it was announced that Dalton was promoted to principal deputy press secretary. She left the Biden administration on March 13, 2024, to accept a job as a part of the communications team at Apple Inc.

=== Additional work ===
From 2015 to 2019, Dalton served as Senior Vice President for Communications and Marketing at the Human Rights Campaign. She also founded the strategic communications firm called Dalton Strategies in 2019.

== Personal life ==
Dalton has at least one child, a son.
