= CGCN Group =

Republican public affairs and communications firm in Washington, D.C

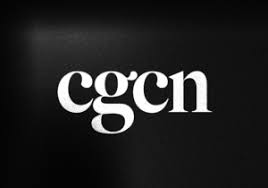
- Formerly: Clark Geduldig Cranford & Nielsen
- Type: Limited liability company
- Industry: Government relations; public affairs; strategic communications
- Predecessor: Clark Geduldig Cranford & Nielsen (2013-2015); Clark Lytle Geduldig & Cranford (2011-2013); Clark Lytle & Geduldig (2008-2011); Clark & Associates (1999-2008)
- Founded: 2000
- Founder: Steve Clark
- Headquarters: Washington, D.C., United States
- Area served: United States
- Website: cgcn.com

CGCN Group is a Washington, D.C.-based public affairs, strategic communications, policy advisory, and analytics firm that provides government relations, stakeholder engagement, regulatory strategy, and communications services to corporate, association, and nonprofit clients. The firm was founded in 2000 and was formerly known as Clark Geduldig Cranford & Nielsen. Several of the firm's principals previously served in Republican administrations and congressional leadership positions. The firm has strong ties to Republican policymakers and the party's conservative wing. Its clients have included financial institutions, energy companies, trade associations, and corporations such as News Corporation, Mastercard, and American Airlines.

== History ==
CGCN Group originated from the lobbying firm created by Steve Clark in 2000. Sam Geduldig and Gary Lytle joined Clark in 2007, and the firm became known as Clark Lytle & Geduldig.

The firm worked with financial services companies during the financial reform debate from 2009 to 2010, involving laws like the Dodd–Frank Wall Street Reform and Consumer Protection Act and the Consumer Financial Protection Bureau. At the time, CGCN had more financial services clients in Washington, D.C., than other firms during the Troubled Asset Relief Program. In the wake of Republicans taking control of Congress in 2010, CGCN saw strong growth in its business and the firm doubled in size from 2015 to 2017. While closely tied to GOP leadership—its partners have worked with former House Speaker John Boehner and others—CGCN was among the first lobbying firms to court the conservative Freedom Caucus.

The firm was known as Clark Lytle Geduldig & Cranford and Clark Geduldig Cranford & Nielsen between 2011 and 2015, when the firm renamed itself CGCN Group. In 2015, CGCN's clients included oil companies, such as Hess, for whom they lobbied to end the ban of crude oil exports. CGCN was named a top lobbying firm by Bloomberg Government in 2015. A report by Bloomberg Government gave CGCN the highest mark for firms retaining clients over the long term. According to Bloomberg, CGCN retains 83 percent of its clients for at least three years, a higher percentage than other firms.

CGCN worked with foreign clients from 2016 to 2019, when it worked with Saudi Arabia to build relationships with U.S. congressional Republicans. The next year, CGCN signed Japan as its second foreign client. In 2017, CGCN lobbied for: SAP America on data security, privacy, cybersecurity, health IT, cloud computing and privacy shield implementation; Puerto Rico Department of Treasury; American Investment Council, a private equity trade group; power company NextEra Energy on energy policy and tax credits; and TransCanada Corp. on the Keystone XL pipeline. The firm's other clients include 21st Century Fox, TC Energy, MasterCard, and NewsCorp. Also in 2017, CGCN announced a partnership with two Democratic firms with close ties to the Congressional Black and Congressional Hispanic caucuses to seek bipartisan victories, potentially in the areas of "jobs, transportation infrastructure, outside investment, energy, and economic development", according to a memo on the partnership. This strategic partnership is called United By Interest (UBI), the first bipartisan, majority-minority-owned government relations firm in the U.S.

In the few years leading up to 2017, CGCN Group quadrupled in size. Like other lobbying firms, CGCN Group posted a strong first year under the Trump administration. It made $8.4 million in revenue in 2017 (compared to $6.6 million in 2016), including $2.2 million in the fourth quarter (compared to $1.6 million the year before). CGCN Group reported $2.6 million in revenue during the fourth quarter of 2024 (with a total annual revenue of $9.6 million in 2024), and $3.8 million in revenue during the fourth quarter of 2025. CGCN nearly doubled its federal lobbying revenue from $9.7 million in 2024 to more than $18.9 million in 2025. According to Roll Call, CGCN is closely related to UBI (United by Interest), a bipartisan K Street (Washington, D.C.) group lobbying business interests on Capitol Hill.

In a 2026 interview, partner Michael Catanzaro said CGCN had declined investment offers from private equity firms to maintain its independence. He also said the firm considered establishing a bipartisan practice following the 2020 election but ultimately decided to remain exclusively Republican-focused.

== Services and practices ==
CGCN Group provides government relations, public affairs, strategic communications, advocacy, policy advisory, regulatory strategy, and analytics services. In 2026, CGCN formalized two divisions, CGCN Policy and Regulatory and CGCN Analytics, alongside the firm's lobbying and strategic communications practices. The policy and regulatory practice includes energy and environmental and health care teams, while the analytics practice is led by senior vice president Anna Mikulska.

== Partners ==
As of February 2026, CGCN Group has 24 partners.

=== Initial partners ===
Partner Steve Clark began the firm in 2000 in Ohio. Sam Geduldig joined in 2007, after previously working as senior advisor to U.S. Representative Roy Blunt and John Boehner's political director from 1997 to 2000. In 2011, Geduldig was named one of Washingtonian 40 Under 40, and he ranked No. 3 on K Street's top 10 lobbyists giving to the GOP in 2016. Jay Cranford joined Clark Lytle & Geduldig in 2011. Mike Nielsen joined CGCN in 2013. He previously worked an aide to GOP members of the Senate Banking Committee and with U.S. Senator Bob Bennett. Nielsen worked on the Gramm–Leach–Bliley Act and the Dodd-Frank financial overhaul.

=== Partners since 2014 ===
John Stipicevic was a member of House Majority Leader Kevin McCarthy's office, where he liaisoned between GOP leadership and conservative members of Congress, before joining CGCN in 2015.

Michael Catanzaro was a partner from 2015 until 2017, when Trump selected him as an energy advisor for the president's National Economic Council. Catanzaro also worked on Trump's transition team following the 2016 election. Catanzaro left the Trump administration in April 2018 to rejoin CGCN Group.

Matt Rhoades joined the firm in 2019. Matt Rhoades was previously campaign manager for Mitt Romney's 2012 presidential run. Scott Riplinger (former legislative director for Mike Crapo) joined CGCN in 2020.

In 2021, as part of a merger with DC-based PR firm Matador, the firm added communications strategist Tracey Schmitt, former RNC Press Secretary and spokeswoman for the Bush re-elect campaign, as a Senior Partner. Merrill Smith, a former Bush Administration official, also joined from Matador.

Since 2020, the firm has nearly quadrupled in size, and grown to include 24 partners, with additions including Tim Pataki, Ja'Ron Smith, Tim Killeen, Amber Kirschoeffer, C. Travis Cone, Jill Hamaker, Alex Renjel, Peter Ventimiglia, and Dave Weinman. The firm has extensive ties with the Trump administration; current partners such as Tim Pataki and Ja'Ron Smith had also worked for the first Trump administration. The firm routinely organizes events with US Cabinet members, including Vice President JD Vance, as well as conservative media outlets such as Breitbart News.

In 2025, the firm hired Harrison Fields, who was Principal Deputy Press Secretary and Special Assistant to the President in the second Trump administration. In 2026, Fields was promoted to partner.

In November 2025, former U.S. representative Brad Wenstrup joined CGCN Group as a strategic partner. Wenstrup also serves on the President's Intelligence Advisory Board.

In 2026, Sarah Gilbert, former chief of staff to Representative Neal Dunn, joined CGCN Group as a partner.

In 2026, Katherine Scarlett, who previously served as chair of the Council on Environmental Quality, joined CGCN Group as a partner. The United States Senate confirmed Scarlett as chair of CEQ in September 2025, where she served as President Trump's advisor on environmental quality policy and led permitting reform negotiations with Congress and across the federal government.

== Awards and recognition ==
Bloomberg Government has included CGCN Group in its annual reports on top-performing lobbying firms in multiple years. In its 2024 report, Bloomberg Government listed CGCN Group with $9.8 million in lobbying revenue; in its 2025 report, Bloomberg Government listed the firm with $19.198 million in revenue, a 96.44 percent year-over-year increase.

Partners at CGCN Group have appeared on The Hill’s annual Top Lobbyists list in each year since 2009.

In 2026, Campaigns & Elections named CGCN Group winner of two Reed Awards: Best Website – Issue Advocacy or Public Affairs Campaign – Non-Partisan, and Best Audio Ad – Public Affairs/Issue Advocacy Campaign or Ballot Initiative.
