= Harrison Fields =

American communications advisor

White House Principal Deputy Press Secretary
- In office January 20, 2025 – August 22, 2025
- President: Donald Trump
- Press Secretary: Karoline Leavitt
- Preceded by: Andrew Bates (Note: As senior deputy press secretary.)
- Succeeded by: Anna Kelly

Personal details
- Born: Wellington, Florida, U.S.
- Party: Republican
- Spouse: Caitlin McCoy (m. 2023)
- Education: Florida State University (BA)

Harrison W. Fields is an American communications advisor who served as the White House principal deputy press secretary from January to August 2025.

In June 2020, Fields became an assistant White House press secretary. After Donald Trump's loss in the 2020 presidential election, he began serving as Florida representative Byron Donalds's communications director. In January 2024, Fields became the assistant director of media and public relations at The Heritage Foundation. In January 2025, Trump named Fields as his White House principal deputy press secretary. Fields resigned in August to work for CGCN Group, a conservative lobbying firm.

== Early life and education ==
Harrison Fields was born in Wellington, Florida. Fields attended Palm Beach Central High School, where he was the junior class vice president. He graduated from Florida State University.

== Career ==
=== White House and congressional work (2018–2024) ===
In 2018, Fields began working for Pam Bondi, the attorney general of Florida, as a communications director. In 2019, he was hired as a presidential writer in the White House Office of Presidential Correspondence. In June 2020, he was appointed as an assistant White House press secretary. After Donald Trump's loss in the 2020 presidential election, Fields began working for Florida representative Byron Donalds as his communications director. In September 2023, he married Caitlin McCoy, a senior director for digital at Plus Communications. In January 2024, Fields became the assistant director of media and public relations at The Heritage Foundation. He served as a surrogate for Trump in his 2024 presidential campaign.

=== White House principal deputy press secretary (January–August 2025) ===
After Trump's second inauguration in January 2025, Fields became the White House principal deputy press secretary. His portfolio included the Department of Energy, the Department of Housing and Urban Development, the Department of Justice, the Department of the Treasury, the Department of Education, and the Department of Government Efficiency. In August, Axios reported that Fields would resign to join CGCN Group, a conservative lobbying firm.

== Views ==
In July 2023, as Florida governor Ron DeSantis faced criticism over comments he had made on slavery, Fields stated that he felt pressure to avoid criticizing critical race theory and the Black Lives Matter movement while condemning curriculum seen as supporting slavery. He was supportive of Donald Trump's decision to speak at a National Association of Black Journalists event in which he questioned Vice President Kamala Harris's race, describing the event's environment as hostile, but its value to Trump as important. Fields has described Democrats as effective at promising African Americans initiatives, but failing to actualize efforts. Speaking to Politico after Trump's victory in the 2024 presidential election, he argued that Black voters are conservative but that Democrats had leveraged inequality to garner their votes, adding that Trump capitalized on economic issues to divide some Black voters.

== Works cited ==
- Booker, Brakkton (July 28, 2023). "DeSantis rocked by Black Republican revolt over slavery comments". Politico.
- Booker, Brakkton (September 10, 2024). "It's a historic debate tonight. No one really wants to talk about it". Politico.
- Crampton, Liz; Johansen, Ben; Cai, Sophia; Sentner, Irie (August 21, 2025). "When the White House calls state lawmakers". Politico.
- Daniels, Cheyanne (September 21, 2025). "Donald Trump made big gains with Black voters in 2024. Can Republicans hold them in the midterms?". Politico.
- Holden, Lindsey (January 21, 2025). "Suit up, we're going to court". Politico.
- Ogles, Jacob (January 6, 2024). "Harrison Fields moves to Heritage Foundation". Florida Politics.
- Oprysko, Caitlin (January 17, 2024). "Telecom lobbyist decamps for K&L Gates". Politico.
- "Palm Beach Central High School student killed in accident". WFLX. February 23, 2012.
- Palmer, Anna; Sherman, Jake (June 20, 2020). "Questions for Trump on last night's SDNY chaos". Politico.
- Ross, Garrett (September 25, 2023). "Menendez spurns calls for resignation". Politico.
- Seltzer, Alexandra (February 23, 2012). "'He had a great future'". The Palm Beach Post.
- Sentner, Irie; Booker, Brakkton; Kapos, Shia (July 31, 2024). "Hostile Trump takes the stage at Black journalists' conference". Politico.
- Thompson, Alex (August 20, 2025). "Trump's principal deputy press secretary heads to K Street". Axios.
- Zanona, Melanie (January 3, 2021). "As Pelosi scrambles for her job, McConnell loses control". Politico.
