= Karine Jean-Pierre =

American political advisor (born 1974)

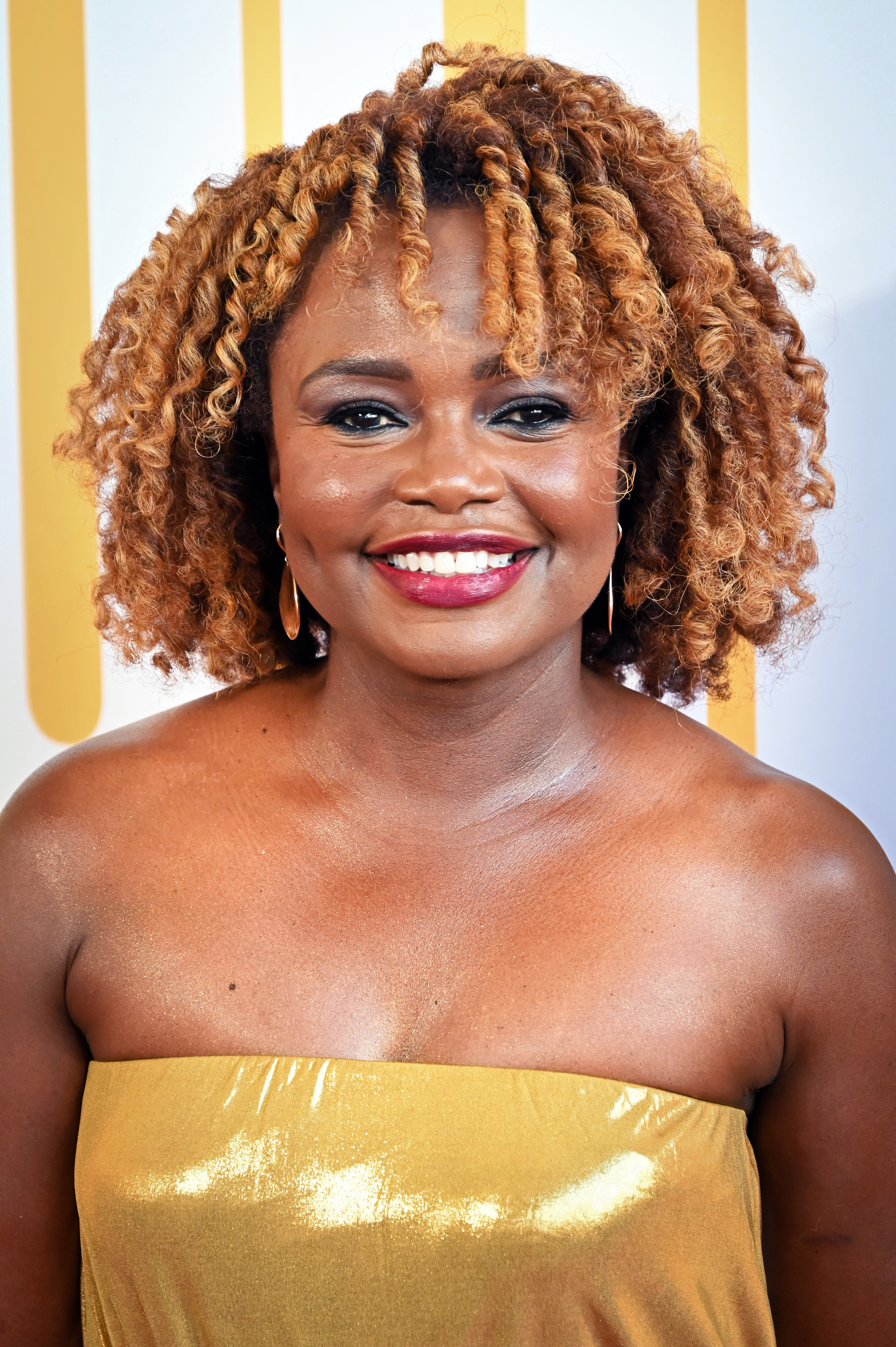
- Jean-Pierre in 2026

35th White House Press Secretary
- In office May 13, 2022 – January 20, 2025
- President: Joe Biden
- Deputy: Olivia Dalton (principal); Andrew Bates (senior)
- Preceded by: Jen Psaki
- Succeeded by: Karoline Leavitt

Senior Advisor to the President
- In office October 7, 2024 – January 20, 2025 Serving with Annie Tomasini, John Podesta, Stephen K. Benjamin, Tom Perez, Ben LaBolt
- President: Joe Biden
- Preceded by: Anita Dunn
- Succeeded by: Massad Boulos

White House Principal Deputy Press Secretary
- In office January 20, 2021 – May 13, 2022
- President: Joe Biden
- Preceded by: Brian Morgenstern
- Succeeded by: Olivia Dalton

Personal details
- Born: August 13, 1974 (age 52) Fort-de-France, Martinique, France
- Party: Independent (2025–present)
- Other political affiliations: Democratic (before 2025)
- Domestic partner: Suzanne Malveaux (2012–2023)
- Children: 1
- Education: New York Institute of Technology (BS); Columbia University (MPA)
- Website: Official website
- Jean-Pierre's voice Jean-Pierre speaks on earthquakes in Turkey and Syria. Recorded February 6, 2023

Karine Jean-Pierre (born August 13, 1974) is an American political advisor and spokesperson who served as the 35th White House press secretary from 2022 to 2025, and as a senior advisor to President Joe Biden from 2024 to 2025. She is the first Black person and the first openly LGBTQ person to serve in the position of White House press secretary. Previously, she served as deputy press secretary to her predecessor, Jen Psaki, from 2021 to 2022, and as the chief of staff for U.S. vice presidential candidate Kamala Harris during the 2020 presidential campaign.

Prior to her work with Harris during the 2020 election and with the Biden–Harris administration, Jean-Pierre was the senior advisor and national spokeswoman for the progressive advocacy group MoveOn.org. She was also previously a political analyst for NBC News and MSNBC and a lecturer in international and public affairs at Columbia University.

In June 2025, Jean-Pierre announced that she had left the Democratic Party and become an independent.

== Early life and education ==
Jean-Pierre was born on August 13, 1974, (Note: Many media outlets have incorrectly reported that Jean-Pierre was born in 1977. The first chapter of Jean-Pierre's memoir Moving Forward states, "About a year later, on August 13, 1974, I was born in Fort-de-France in Martinique.") in Fort-de-France, Martinique, France, the daughter of Haitian immigrants. She has two younger siblings, and was five when her family relocated to Queens Village, a neighborhood in Queens, New York City. Her mother worked as a home health aide and was active in her Pentecostal church, while her father was a taxi driver, who had trained as an engineer. Jean-Pierre was often responsible for caring for her siblings, eight and ten years younger, because both parents worked six or seven days per week. She has described her household as conservative, Catholic, and repressive.

Jean-Pierre graduated from Kellenberg Memorial High School, a college-preparatory school on Long Island, in 1993. Her parents wanted her to study medicine, and she studied life sciences at the New York Institute of Technology as a commuter student, but performed poorly on the Medical College Admission Test. Changing career tracks, she earned a bachelor's degree from the New York Institute of Technology in 1997. She earned a Master of Public Affairs from the School of International and Public Affairs at Columbia University, in 2003, where she served in student government and decided to pursue politics. At Columbia University, one of her mentors was Ester Fuchs, whose class she attended during the Fall 2001 semester.

== Career ==
=== Early career ===
Following graduate school, Jean-Pierre worked as the director of legislative and budget affairs for New York City councilor James F. Gennaro. She was the southeast regional political director for John Edwards' presidential campaign in 2004. In 2006, she was hired as the outreach coordinator for Walmart Watch in Washington, D.C. She joined the Columbia University faculty in 2014, where she is a lecturer in international and public affairs.

=== Obama administration ===
During Barack Obama's 2008 presidential campaign, Jean-Pierre was the campaign's southeast regional political director and was the regional political director for the White House Office of Political Affairs during the Obama administration's first term.

In 2011, Jean-Pierre served as National Deputy Battleground States Director for President Obama's 2012 re-election campaign. She led the delegate selection and ballot access process and managed the political engagement in key states, providing resources to help states determine "the best way for them to get the word out for the campaign."

Jean-Pierre served as the deputy campaign manager for Martin O'Malley's 2016 presidential campaign.

=== MoveOn and political commentary ===
In April 2016, MoveOn named Jean-Pierre as a senior advisor and national spokesperson for the 2016 presidential election. MoveOn said she would "advise on and serve as a spokesperson around MoveOn's electoral work, including a major effort to stand up to Donald Trump."

In January 2019, Jean-Pierre became a political analyst for NBC News and MSNBC.

Jean-Pierre has worked at the Center for Community and Corporate Ethics. In December 2018, The Haitian Times named her one of six "Haitian Newsmakers of the Year".

=== Biden 2020 presidential campaign ===
Jean-Pierre worked as a senior advisor to Joe Biden's 2020 presidential campaign. She joined the Biden team in May 2020, and explained to The Haitian Times that a desire to shape the future was especially motivating; she said that when she was approached by the campaign, she looked at her daughter and thought, "There is no way I can not get involved in this election." In August, it was announced that Jean-Pierre would serve as the Chief of Staff for Biden's vice presidential nominee, who had not yet been announced.

== White House press secretary (2021—2025) ==
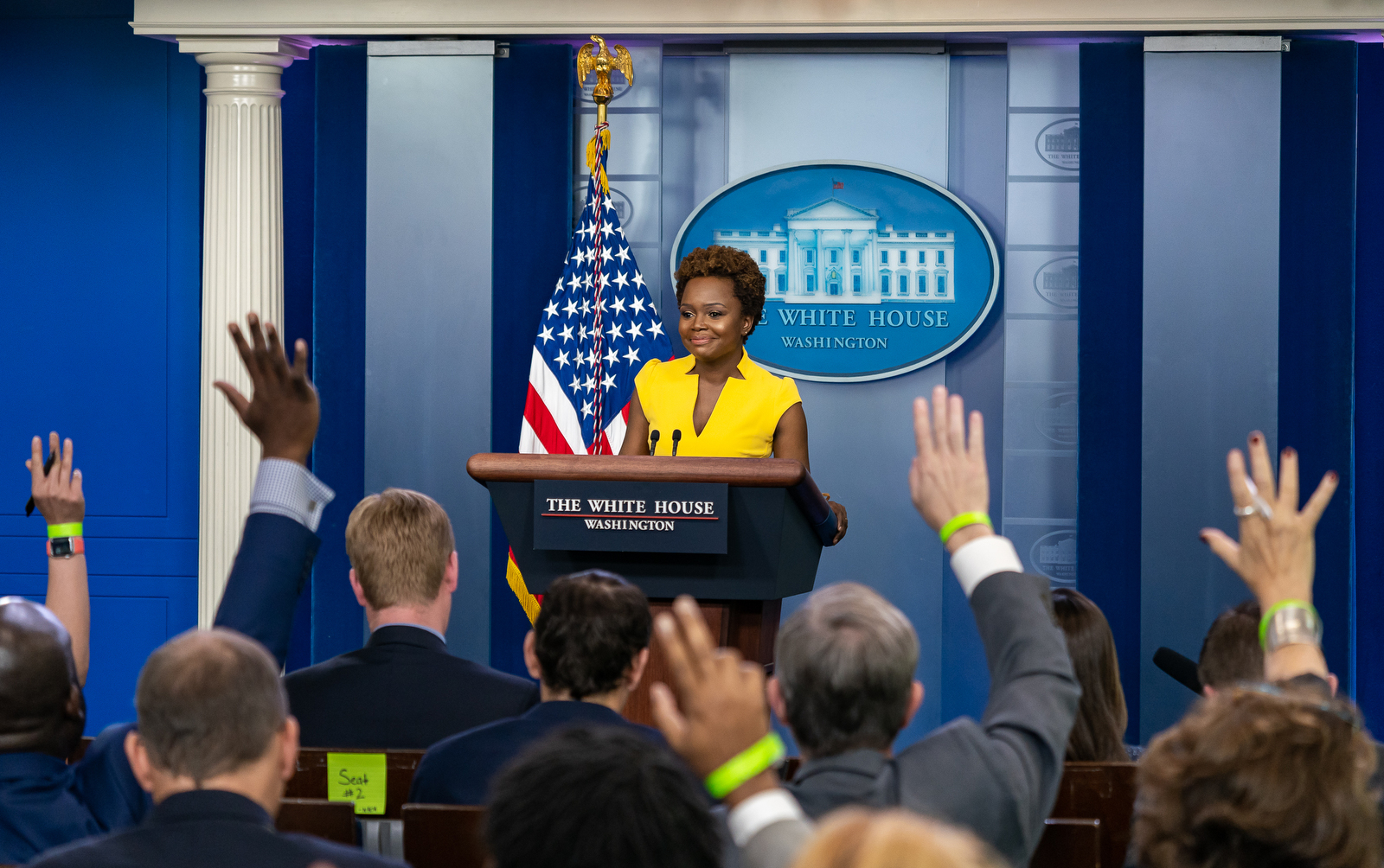
Jean-Pierre holding her first White House press briefing in May 2021

On November 29, 2020, the Biden-Harris transition team announced that Jean-Pierre had been made Principal Deputy Press Secretary. On May 26, 2021, she gave her first White House press briefing, becoming the first openly LGBTQ person to do so and the first Black woman to do so since 1991. On May 5, 2022, it was announced that she would succeed Jen Psaki as White House Press Secretary on May 13. She is the first Black person and the first openly LGBTQ person to hold the position.

During her tenure, Jean-Pierre often responded to press questions by citing the Hatch Act, a law which forbids civil-service employees from engaging in political action while on the job. Journalists criticized Jean-Pierre for this, arguing that she was using the Act to avoid answering their questions. In June 2023, the Office of Special Counsel (OSC), the government agency that enforces the Hatch Act, stated in a letter that Jean-Pierre had violated the act in briefings before the 2022 midterm election, in which she repeatedly made references to "MAGA Republicans", and referred to candidates as "mega MAGA Republican officials who don't believe in the rule of law". The OSC issued Jean-Pierre a warning, stating that it was not clear whether Jean-Pierre had willfully violated the law, but that further incidents could result in the OSC pursuing disciplinary action. Jean-Pierre said that she had been told that the phrasing was acceptable "in the context of talking about their policies, in talking about their values". In October 2023, the OSC issued Jean-Pierre another warning, having found she used the term "MAGA" again shortly after their original warning. As she had not used the term in her official capacity since that June, they declined to pursue disciplinary action.

Beginning in early 2023 with the Chinese balloon incident, Jean-Pierre was often joined in media briefings by National Security Communications Advisor John Kirby, who had more experience in government communications. Kirby grew to occupy many of the roles traditionally filled by the press secretary, such as appearing on news programs. He also fielded questions on topics going beyond national security and foreign policy. Jean-Pierre continued to run the joint press conferences with Kirby and select the reporters who would question him instead of letting him choose. Kirby expressed frustration at this tactic, and White House aides described it as a sign of Jean-Pierre's insecurity. Tensions grew between Jean-Pierre and Kirby, with the topic being racially fraught due to the perception that Kirby, who is white, had upstaged Jean-Pierre. Black Democratic officials criticized Kirby's presence as insulting, as it suggested a need to supervise the first Black press secretary. After communications aide Anita Dunn departed from her role as White House senior adviser, Jean-Pierre saw more success in her efforts to block Kirby from White House press briefings, often by appealing to White House chief of staff Jeff Zients.

In December 2023, Jean-Pierre turned down an offer to become president of abortion advocacy group EMILY's List. On October 7, 2024, Jean-Pierre was promoted to a Senior Advisor position in the Biden administration, concurrent to her role as Press Secretary. After Hurricane Helene, Jean-Pierre suddenly ended a press conference, accusing journalists in spreading misinformation about FEMA funding through their questions.

Jean-Pierre frequently defended Biden against questions about his age, mental acuity, and fitness to serve as president. Jean-Pierre responded to concerns about Biden's age by saying that "80 is the new 40", described videos seemingly showing Biden making gaffes as "cheap fakes", and dismissed reporting about Biden's age being a challenge for his reelection campaign as "fallacious". After Biden performed poorly in a June 2024 presidential debate, journalists from the White House press corps sharply criticized Jean-Pierre's credibility in addressing concerns about Biden's health. Reporters described Jean-Pierre as lacking transparency and being evasive on the issue, and negatively compared her skill in handling such questions with her predecessor, Jen Psaki. Jean-Pierre acknowledged making mistakes in handling questions about Biden's health.

=== Post–Biden administration ===
In June 2025, Jean-Pierre announced that she had left the Democratic Party to become an independent. Her second book, Independent: A Look Inside a Broken White House, Outside the Party Lines, was published in October 2025.

In November 2026, Will Jawando, the county executive-elect of Montgomery County, Maryland, announced that Jean-Pierre would serve on his transition steering committee.

== Personal life ==
Jean-Pierre was in a relationship with former CNN correspondent Suzanne Malveaux until September 2023. They have an adopted daughter.

She is fluent in English, French, and Haitian Creole.

Jean-Pierre's book, Moving Forward: A Story of Hope, Hard Work, and the Promise of America, was published in 2019. She reviews her life and encourages people to become involved in politics. It was described by WJLA-TV as "part memoir, part call to arms". Jean-Pierre was inducted as an honorary member of Alpha Kappa Alpha sorority on July 13, 2025.

== Awards and honors ==
In 2021, Jean-Pierre was named by Carnegie Corporation of New York as an honoree of the Great Immigrants Award.

== Published works ==
- Moving Forward: A Story of Hope, Hard Work, and the Promise of America. New York: Hanover Square Press. November 5, 2019. ISBN 978-1-335-91783-6.
- Independent: A Look Inside a Broken White House, Outside the Party Lines. New York: Legacy Lit. October 21, 2025. ISBN 978-1538777084.

Political offices
Preceded by Jen Psaki	White House Press Secretary; 2022–2025	Succeeded by Karoline Leavitt
