= Reidar Lie =

Norwegian philosopher

Reidar K. Lie
- Born: 1954 (age 71–72)

Education
- Education: University of Minnesota (Ph.D.), University of Bergen (M.D.)
- Thesis: Theory change in cardiovascular research (1987)
- Doctoral advisor: Philip Kitcher

Philosophical work
- Era: 21st-century philosophy
- Region: Western philosophy
- School: Analytic
- Institutions: University of Bergen
- Main interests: bioethics, research ethics
- Website: http://www.reidarlie.no/

Reidar Krummradt Lie (born 1954) is a Norwegian philosopher and emeritus professor of philosophy at the University of Bergen. He was chair of the Philosophy Department from 2011 to 2019. He is also adjunct researcher at the Department of Bioethics at the National Institutes of Health in Bethesda Maryland, US. He was previously adjunct professor at the Thammasat University in Bangkok, Thailand, and director of the Center for Medical Ethics at the University of Oslo in Norway. Lie is known for his research on bioethics and research ethics.

== Edited books ==
- Oxford Textbook of Clinical Research Ethics, Oxford University Press, 2008
- Evidence-based Practice in Medicine and Health Care: A Discussion of the Ethical Issues, Springer, Berlin Verlag, 2005
- Healthy thoughts: European Perspectives on Health Care Ethics. Peeters Verlag, Leuven, 2002
- Health Ethics in Six SEAR Countries. WHO-SEARO, New Delhi, 1999
- Kompendium i medisinsk etikk og vitenskapsteori. Universitetsforlaget, Oslo 1982
