= The Oxford Textbook of Clinical Research Ethics =

- Author: Ezekiel Emanuel, Christine Grady, Robert A. Crouch, Reidar Lie, Franklin G. Miller, David Wendler
- Subject: Research ethics
- Published: 2008
- Publisher: Oxford University Press
- Pages: 848 pp.
- ISBN: 9780195168655

The Oxford Textbook of Clinical Research Ethics is a textbook on clinical research ethics edited by Ezekiel Emanuel, Christine Grady, Robert A. Crouch, Reidar Lie, Franklin G. Miller and David Wendler.
