= Andrew Bates (spokesman) =

White House political staffer (born 1987)

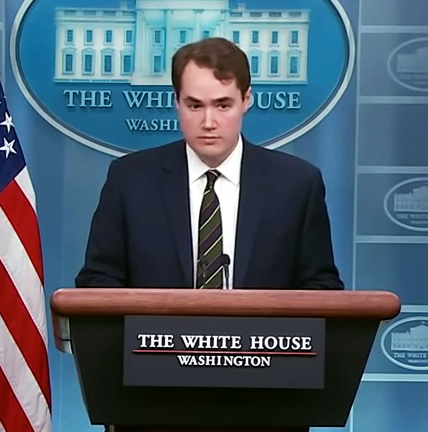
- Bates at a press conference in 2022

White House Senior Deputy Press Secretary
- In office May 7, 2024 – January 20, 2025
- President: Joe Biden
- Secretary: Karine Jean-Pierre
- Preceded by: Olivia Dalton (Principal Deputy)
- Succeeded by: Harrison Fields (Principal Deputy)

United States Trade Representative Press Secretary
- In office September 2014 – May 2016
- President: Barack Obama
- Representative: Michael Froman
- Preceded by: Anne Eisenhower
- Succeeded by: Matt Swenson

United States Trade Representative Deputy Press Secretary
- In office December 2013 – September 2014
- President: Barack Obama
- Representative: Michael Froman

Personal details
- Born: Andrew James Bates; January 8, 1987 (age 39) Winston-Salem, North Carolina, U.S.
- Party: Democratic
- Education: North Carolina State University (BA)

Andrew James Bates (born January 8, 1987) is an American political adviser and former White House deputy press secretary currently working as a Managing Director at Orchestra Public Affairs. He previously was Deputy Assistant to the President and Senior Deputy Press Secretary. A member of the Democratic Party, he was previously the Director of Rapid Response for the Joe Biden 2020 presidential campaign. Bates also worked in the Obama-Biden Administration as Press Secretary for the U.S. Trade Representative (2014–2016) and as a communications aide in the White House (2010–2013). Bates was the North Carolina communications director for Hillary Clinton's 2016 presidential campaign and led the Democratic super PAC American Bridge's House races arm in 2018.

== Early life and education ==
Bates is a native of Winston-Salem, North Carolina. He graduated from Richard Joshua Reynolds High School in Winston-Salem. He has a bachelor's degree in Political Science from North Carolina State University, where he graduated in 2009 after taking time off to intern for the 2008 Obama campaign.

== Career ==
=== Obama administration ===
While studying political science at North Carolina State University, Bates took time off from school to intern for the 2008 Obama campaign. After returning to earn his degree, he was hired by the White House as a media monitor, later becoming a press assistant and then a researcher.

In December 2013, Bates began serving as press secretary to the U.S. Trade Representative, Ambassador Michael Froman. While transitioning roles, Politico wrote that he had been a "fixture" of the Obama communications team.

=== 2016 Hillary Clinton presidential campaign ===
Bates was the North Carolina communications director for Hillary Clinton's 2016 presidential campaign.

=== 2020 Joe Biden presidential campaign ===
At its launch in April 2019, Bates joined the 2020 presidential campaign of former Vice President Joe Biden as Director of Rapid Response.

During the Democratic primary, with then-president Donald Trump stepping up attacks on Biden following news breaking that he had withheld military aid to Ukraine in an attempt to pressure the Zelenskyy government to tarnish the former vice president, Bates told The Washington Post, "For someone who claims to be a 'dealmaker,' Donald Trump has certainly given Joe Biden a lot of rent-free real estate in his own head."

In November 2020, with Trump signaling that he would refuse to concede the election, Bates responded, "The American people will decide this election. And the United States government is perfectly capable of escorting trespassers out of the White House."

=== Biden administration ===
Bates was the White House Press Office's point person for the confirmation of Justice Ketanji Brown Jackson to the United States Supreme Court, working under Ben LaBolt.

In October 2022, Bates was promoted to White House Deputy Press Secretary and Senior Communications Adviser for Strategic Response.

He denounced Donald Trump for saying the Constitution should be "terminated." He also called it "sickening" when Trump shared a social media video that contained the term "unified Reich."

In the aftermath of the 2023 Hawaii wildfires, Bates defended President Biden against the Republican National Committee's criticism of the president stopping to pet a search-and-rescue dog while greeting first responders during a visit to Maui.

Bates criticized Elon Musk for a tweet that appeared to endorse replacement theory: "We condemn this abhorrent promotion of Antisemitic and racist hate in the strongest terms, which runs against our core values as Americans."

In December 2023, after multiple university presidents testified about antisemitism on college campuses but refused to say if calling for genocide of Jews constituted harassment, Bates released a statement saying, "It's unbelievable that this needs to be said: calls for genocide are monstrous and antithetical to everything we represent as a country."

In May 2024, it was announced that Bates was moving in to the role of Senior Deputy Press Secretary.

The May 2025 book Original Sin, by Jake Tapper and Alex Thompson, alleges Bates was the "tip of the spear" in the public-facing defense of President Biden's mental acuity during his administration. Bates responded that some of the book's claims are "distorted" and "stretching select facts."

=== Opposition to the second Trump administration ===
Bates has publicly opposed the second Trump administration. In a February 2025 op-ed for Fox News, he encouraged the Democratic Party to focus the 2026 midterm cycle on the cost of living, writing: "Now that they're in charge, instead of cutting costs, Republicans are selling Americans' government off to wealthy special interests – starting with tax giveaways for the rich that voters despise across party lines."

After Bates criticized Trump for seeking the impeachment of judges who ruled against him, the White House released a statement calling Bates a "left-wing activist" who wanted to "destroy the separation of powers and subvert the will of the American people."

Bates also advised a group of former prosecutors opposing Trump's nomination of Ed Martin as the U.S. Attorney for Washington, D.C. and publicly criticized the nomination on MSNBC. In response, Department of Justice official Michael Caputo posted on X, "Careful, son. Choose your words wisely."

=== House Oversight Committee testimony ===
Bates was among the former Biden administration staffers requested by congressional Republicans to testify before the House Oversight Committee. During a voluntary interview, he testified that President Biden had been fully in charge during his term, aligning with statements from other aides. Bates also criticized the committee for not investigating what he alleged was historic corruption in the Trump administration.

Following the interview, when questioned by conservative reporters, Bates asked, "I want to know why Ghislaine Maxwell's in minimum security," referencing reports that Maxwell was receiving special treatment in prison.

=== Dispute with Jill Biden ===
Bates criticized former First Lady Jill Biden's memoir regarding President Biden's decision to run for re-election and his 2024 debate with Donald Trump, arguing it was unnecessarily divisive for the Democratic Party ahead of the 2026 midterms. He told the New York Post, "We had a duty to win and we didn't. I think about that all the time. But I don't see why that painful conversation for the party needed to be publicly reopened right now."

Jill Biden responded in an interview, stating, "I want to say to Andrew: Call me up. If somebody has something to say, then say it to my face." The Washington Post reported that other former Biden administration and campaign officials were publicly irritated by the former first lady's remarks about Bates, who was widely viewed as a stalwart defender of the family. Former Obama administration spokesperson and Pod Save America co-host Tommy Vietor defended Bates, posting on X, "No one was more loyal to the Biden family and fought harder for them than @AndrewBatesNC. Shitty to see that that loyalty was a one-way street."

=== Ruben Gallego ===
In June 2026, as the House Ethics Committee probed his campaign finance records, Senator Ruben Gallego hired Bates to advise him on crisis communications as he faced blowback for alleged sexual indiscretions and his endorsements of Graham Platner and Eric Swalwell.

== Personal life ==
On September 17, 2022, Bates married Megan Apper.
