= Ezekiel Emanuel =

American oncologist and bioethicist (born 1957)

Zeke Emanuel
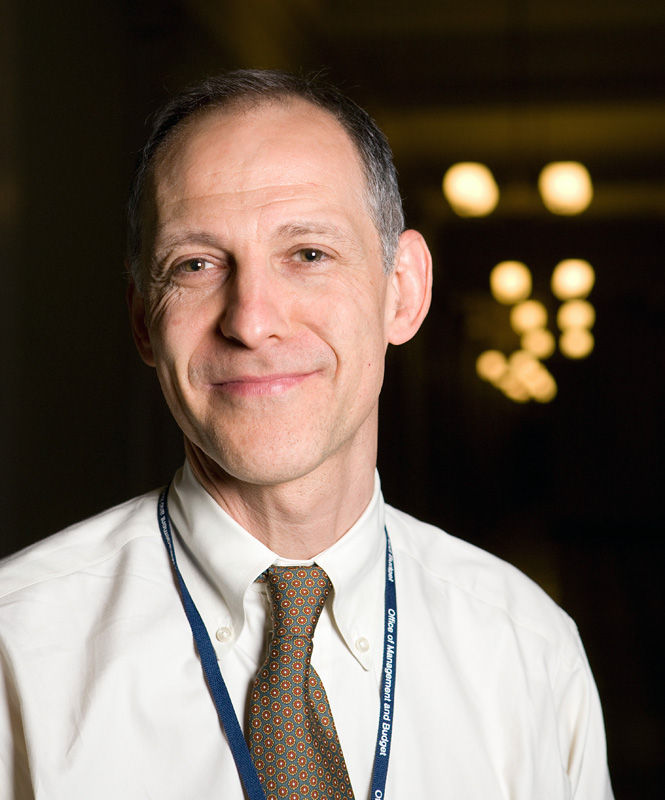

Personal details
- Born: Ezekiel Jonathan Emanuel; September 6, 1957 (age 69) Chicago, Illinois, U.S.
- Spouse: Linda Emanuel (m. 1983; div. 2008)
- Children: 3
- Relatives: Rahm Emanuel (brother); Ari Emanuel (brother)
- Education: Amherst College (BA); Exeter College, Oxford (MSc); Harvard University (MD, PhD)

Ezekiel Jonathan "Zeke" Emanuel (born September 6, 1957) is an American oncologist and bioethicist. He is a senior fellow at the Center for American Progress. He is the current Vice Provost for Global Initiatives at the University of Pennsylvania and chair of the Department of Medical Ethics and Health Policy. Previously, Emanuel served as the Diane and Robert Levy University Professor at Penn. He holds a joint appointment at the University of Pennsylvania School of Medicine and the Wharton School and was formerly an associate professor at the Harvard Medical School until 1998 when he joined the National Institutes of Health.

On November 9, 2020, President-elect Joe Biden named Emanuel to be one of the 16 members of his COVID-19 Advisory Board.

== Early life and education ==
Emanuel is the son of Benjamin M. Emanuel and Marsha (Smulevitz) Emanuel. His father, Benjamin M. Emanuel, is a Jerusalem-born pediatrician who was once a member of the Irgun, a Jewish paramilitary organization that operated in Mandate Palestine. As of 2010 he lived in a Chicago suburb. Emanuel's mother, Marsha, a nurse and psychiatric social worker who was raised in the North Lawndale community on Chicago's West Side, was active in civil rights, including the Congress of Racial Equality (CORE). She attended marches and demonstrations with her children. In a 2009 interview Emanuel recalled that in his childhood "worrying about ethical questions was very much part and parcel of our daily routine."

His two younger brothers are former Chicago mayor Rahm Emanuel and Hollywood-based talent agent Ari Emanuel. He has an adopted sister, Shoshana Emanuel, who has cerebral palsy. His father's brother, Emanuel, was killed in the Great Arab Revolt in the British Mandate of Palestine, after which the family changed its name from Auerbach to Emanuel in his honor.

As children, the three Emanuel brothers shared a bedroom and spent summers together in Israel. All three brothers took ballet lessons in their childhood, which Emanuel says "hardened us and taught us that if you do something unusual, people will take potshots at you." Emanuel and his brother Rahm frequently argue about healthcare policy. Emanuel mimics his brother's end of the conversation: "You want to change the whole healthcare system, and I can't even get SCHIP [State Children's Health Insurance Program] passed with dedicated funding? What kind of idiot are you?"

Emanuel graduated from Amherst College in 1979 and subsequently received his M.Sc. from Exeter College, Oxford, in biochemistry. He simultaneously studied for an M.D. and a Ph.D. in political philosophy from Harvard University, receiving the degrees in 1988 and 1989, respectively. He was a member of the first cohort of Faculty Fellows at the Edmond J. Safra Center for Ethics at Harvard from 1987 to 1988. Emanuel completed an internship and residency at Beth Israel Hospital in internal medicine. Subsequently, he undertook fellowships in medicine and medical oncology at the Dana–Farber Cancer Institute, and is a breast oncologist.

== Career ==
After completing his post-doctoral training, Emanuel pursued a career in academic medicine, rising to the level of associate professor at Harvard Medical School in 1997. He soon moved into the public sector, and held the position of Chief of the Department of Bioethics at the Clinical Center of the U.S. National Institutes of Health. Emanuel served as Special Advisor for Health Policy to Peter Orszag, the former Director of the Office of Management and Budget in the Obama administration. Emanuel entered the administration with different views from President Barack Obama on how to reform health care, but was said by colleagues to be working for the White House goals.

Since September 2011, Emanuel has headed the Department of Medical Ethics & Health Policy at the University of Pennsylvania, where he also serves as a Penn Integrates Knowledge Professor, under the official title of Diane S. Levy and Robert M. Levy University Professor. On November 9, 2020, President-elect Joe Biden named Emanuel to be one of the 16 members of his coronavirus advisory board.

== Views ==
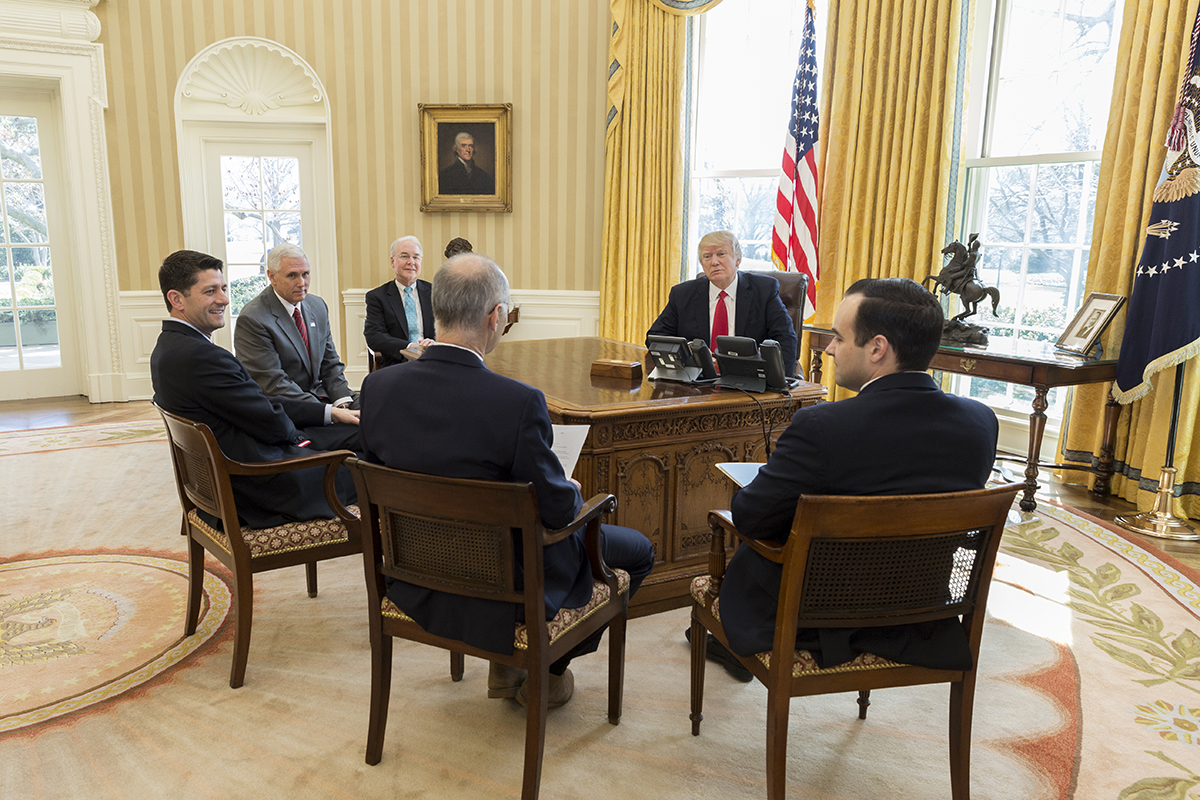
Emanuel meeting with Donald Trump in 2017

=== Portable health insurance ===
In articles and in his book Healthcare, Guaranteed, Emanuel said that universal health care could be guaranteed by replacing employer paid health care insurance, Medicaid and Medicare with health care vouchers funded by a value-added tax. In the article "Why Tie Health Insurance to a Job?", Emanuel said that employer based health insurance should be replaced by state or regional insurance exchanges that pool individuals and small groups to pay the same lower prices charged to larger employers. Emanuel said that this would allow portable health insurance even to people that lose their jobs or change jobs, while at the same time preserving the security of employer based health benefits by giving consumers the bargaining power of a large group of patients. According to Emanuel, this would end discrimination by health insurance companies in the form of denial of health insurance based on age or preexisting conditions.

Emanuel and Fuchs reject a single-payer system, because it goes against American values of individualism. "The biggest problem with single-payer is its failure to cohere with core American values. Single-payer puts everyone into the same system with the same coverage and makes it virtually impossible to add amenities and services through the private market."

=== Opposition to legalization of euthanasia (1997) ===
Emanuel said that legalizing euthanasia, as was done in the Netherlands, might be counterproductive, in that it would decrease support for pain management and mental health care. However, Emanuel does support the use of medical directives to allow patients to express their wishes when they can no longer communicate. Ezekiel, and his former wife Linda Emanuel, an M.D. Ph.D. bioethicist and geriatrician, created the Medical Directive, which is described as more specific and extensive than previous living wills and is a third generation Advance Directive. He claims the Hippocratic Oath debunks the theory that opposition to euthanasia is modern. Emanuel said that for the vast majority of dying patients, "legalizing euthanasia or physician-assisted suicide would be of no benefit. To the contrary, it would be a way of avoiding the complex and arduous efforts required of doctors and other health-care providers to ensure that dying patients receive humane, dignified care." Emanuel said that a historical review of opinions on euthanasia from ancient Greece to now "suggests an association between interest in legalizing euthanasia and moments when Social Darwinism and raw individualism, free markets and wealth accumulation, and limited government are celebrated."

=== Rationing, death panel controversy (2009) ===
The controversy surrounding Emanuel is due to claims by Betsy McCaughey and Sarah Palin accusing Emanuel of supporting euthanasia. Emanuel has opposed euthanasia. These claims have been used by Republicans opposing health care reform.

Betsy McCaughey described Ezekiel Emanuel as a "Deadly Doctor" in a New York Post opinion article. The article, which accused Emanuel of advocating healthcare rationing by age and disability, was quoted from on the floor of the House of Representatives by Representative Michele Bachmann of Minnesota. Sarah Palin cited the Bachmann speech and said that Emanuel's philosophy was "Orwellian" and "downright evil", and tied it to a health care reform end of life counseling provision she claimed would create a "death panel". Emanuel said that Palin's death panel statement was "Orwellian".

PolitiFact described McCaughey's claim as a "ridiculous falsehood." FactCheck.org said, "We agree that Emanuel's meaning is being twisted. In one article, he was talking about a philosophical trend, and in another, he was writing about how to make the most ethical choices when forced to choose which patients get organ transplants or vaccines when supplies are limited." An article on Time.com said that Emanuel "was only addressing extreme cases like organ donation, where there is an absolute scarcity of resources ... 'My quotes were just being taken out of context.'" A decade ago, when many doctors wanted to legalize euthanasia or physician-assisted suicide, Emanuel opposed it. Emanuel said the "death panel" idea is "an outright lie, a complete fabrication. And the paradox, the hypocrisy, the contradiction is that many of the people who are attacking me now supported living wills and consultations with doctors about end-of-life care, before they became against it for political reasons." "I worked pretty hard and against the odds to improve end-of-life care. And so to have that record and that work completely perverted—it's pretty shocking."

=== "The Perfect Storm of Overutilization" (2008) ===
In the 2008 Journal of the American Medical Association article "The Perfect Storm of Overutilization" Emanuel said, "Overall, US health care expenditures are 2.4 times the average of those of all developed countries ($2759 per person), yet health outcomes for US patients, whether measured by life expectancy, disease-specific mortality rates, or other variables, are unimpressive." He said that expensive drugs and treatments that provide only marginal benefits are the largest problems. Fee-for-service payments, physician directed pharmaceutical marketing, and medical malpractice laws and the resultant defensive medicine encourage overutilization. Direct-to-consumer marketing by pharmaceutical companies also drives up costs.

According to Time, Betsy McCaughey said that Emanuel "has criticized medical culture for trying to do everything for a patient, 'regardless of the cost or effects on others,' without making clear that he was not speaking of lifesaving care but of treatments with little demonstrated value." Emanuel made a related comment during an interview for The Washington Post, when he said that improving the quality and efficiency of healthcare to avoid unnecessary and even harmful care would be a way to avoid the need for rationing.

One reason the high cost of health care yields disappointing results is because only 0.05 percent of health care dollars are spent on assessing how well new health care technology works. This is largely because health care lobbyists oppose such research. For example, when the Agency for Health Care Policy and Research found that there was little evidence to support common back operations, orthopedic and neurosurgeons lobbied to cut funding for such research.

Emanuel said that fee-for-service reimbursements encourage spending on ineffective health care. However, more should be spent on fraud detection, coordinating health services for patients with multiple doctors, and evaluating the effectiveness of new medical technologies such as genetic fingerprints for cancer and better ways of managing intravenous lines.

In an article in The Washington Post that Emanuel co-wrote with Shannon Brownlee, they described the health care system as "truly dysfunctional, often chaotic", "spectacularly wasteful" and "expensive".

=== Conflicts of interest ===
In a 2007 slideshow Conflicts of Interest, Emanuel said that there were conflicts of interest between a physician's primary responsibilities (providing optimal care for patients, promoting patient safety and public health) and a physician's secondary interests (publishing, educating, obtaining research funding, obtaining a good income and political activism). Emanuel said that while it is difficult to know when conflicts of interest exist, the fact that they do is "the truth". When there is no doubt of a conflict, the issue is not a mere conflict of interest, but fraud.

In a 2007 article Conflict of Interest in Industry-sponsored Drug Development Emanuel said that there is a conflict between the primary interests of drug researchers (conducting and publishing good test results and protecting the patient) and secondary concerns (obligations to family and medical societies and money from industries). However, industry sponsored tests are more likely to use double-blind protocols and randomization, and more likely to preset study endpoints and mention adverse effects. Also, there is no evidence that patients are harmed by such studies. However, there is evidence that money influences how test results are interpreted. Emanuel mentioned the Selfox study on the use of calcium channel blockers in treating hypertension, in which authors with a financial interest in the results reported much better results than the rest. Worse yet, test results sponsored by industry are likely to be widely published only if the results are positive. For example, in a Whittington study for data on selective serotonin reuptake inhibitors, negative results were much less likely to be published than positive results. However, in The Obligation to Participate in Biomedical Research the authors Schaefer, Emanuel and Wertheimer said that people should be encouraged to view participation in biomedical research as a civic obligation, because of the public good that could result.

In a 2017 article Conflict of Interest for Patient-Advocacy Organizations Emanuel found that financial support of patient-advocacy organizations from drug, device, and biotechnology organizations was widespread (83% of reviewed organizations). Later that year, he argued in another article Why There are No "Potential" Conflicts of Interest that conflicts of interest exist whether or not bias or harm has actually occurred.

=== Global health ===
In May 2009, President Obama introduced a new global health initiative designed to shift priorities in U.S. global health funding. Dr. Emanuel, a key advisor to the administration on health policy and the plan’s architect, proposed prioritizing maternal and child health programs over future increases in funding for President's Emergency Plan for AIDS Relief (PEPFAR). Emanuel argued that PEPFAR was "not the most effective use of international health resources" and did not adequately address many critical health challenges faced by developing countries. Anand Reddi challenged Emanuel's arguments for reallocating funds away from HIV programs to support broader health initiatives. Reddi argued that reducing HIV funding would jeopardize lifesaving antiretroviral treatment for millions in resource-limited settings and undermine global progress in combating the epidemic.

== Recognition ==
Emanuel's awards include the Toppan Dissertation Prize, the Harvard award for best political science dissertation of 1988 and the Dan David Prize for his contribution to the field of bioethics in 2018. Emanuel has received honorary degrees from Icahn School of Medicine at Mount Sinai, Union Graduate College, the Medical College of Wisconsin, and Macalester College.

== Personal life ==
Emanuel is a divorced father of three daughters.

In 1981, while at Oxford, Emanuel was a participant on the BBC reality TV program Now Get Out Of That.

== Selected publications ==
- The Ends of Human Life: Medical Ethics in a Liberal Polity. Cambridge: Harvard University Press. 1998. ISBN 9780674253261.
- No Margin, No Mission: Health Care Organizations and the Quest for Ethical Excellence. Oxford: Oxford University Press. 2003. ISBN 9780195158960.
- Healthcare, Guaranteed: A Simple, Secure Solution for America. New York: PublicAffairs. 2008. ISBN 9781586486624.
- The Oxford Textbook of Clinical Research Ethics. Oxford: Oxford University Press. 2011. ISBN 9780199768639.
- Brothers Emanuel: A Memoir of an American Family. New York: Random House. 2013. ISBN 9780812981261.
- Reinventing American Health Care: How the Affordable Care Act Will Improve Our Terribly Complex, Blatantly Unjust, Outrageously Expensive, Gross Health Care System. New York: PublicAffairs. 2015. ISBN 9781541724143.
- Prescription for the Future: The Twelve Transformational Practices of Highly Effective Medical Organizations. New York: PublicAffairs. 2017. ISBN 9781541724143.
- Global Health Priority-Setting: Beyond Cost-Effectiveness. Oxford: Oxford University Press. 2019. ISBN 9780190912765.
- The Trillion Dollar Revolution: How the Affordable Care Act Transformed Politics, Law, and Health Care in America. New York: PublicAffairs. 2020. ISBN 9781541797796.
- Which Country Has the World's Best Health Care?. New York: PublicAffairs. 2022. ISBN 9781541797758.
- Eat Your Ice Cream: Six Simple Rules for a Long and Healthy Life. New York: W. W. Norton & Company. 2026. ISBN 9781324117537.

== See also ==
- Longevity
- List of After Words interviews first aired in 2014
- Public image of Sarah Palin
- List of members of the National Academy of Medicine
- List of people from Wilmette, Illinois
- Members of the Council on Foreign Relations

== Sources ==
- Auerbach, Sarah (August 24, 2009). "Come for Dinner, Stay for Life: Zeke Emanuel". Amherst.
- Emanuel, Ezekiel J. (March 23, 2005). "Whose Right to Die?". Atlantic Monthly. 279 (3): 73–9. PMID 11657423.
- Emanuel, Ezekiel J. & Fuchs, Victor R. (February 19, 2007). "Vouchsafe: A new healthcare plan". The New Republic.
- Emanuel, Ezekiel J. (2008). Healthcare Guaranteed: A Simple, Secure Solution for America. New York: Perseus Publishing. ISBN 978-1-58648-662-4.
- Emanuel, Ezekiel J., Prescription for the Future, 2017. (How to improve the quality of U.S. medical care and how to lower its current exorbitant cost.)
- Persad, Govind; Wertheimer, Alan & Emanuel, Ezekiel J. (2009). "Principles for allocation of scarce medical interventions". The Lancet. 373 (9661): 423–431. doi:10.1016/S0140-6736(09)60137-9. PMID 19186274. S2CID 17368581.
- Wysocki, Bernard Jr. (March 3, 2005). "Some Scientists Say New Ethics Rules May Damage NIH". The Wall Street Journal.
- Zwillich, Todd (2005). "Financial ethics pit NIH scientists against government". The Lancet. 366 (9485): 537–538. doi:10.1016/S0140-6736(05)67082-1. PMID 16104071. S2CID 36078087.
