= Anna Kelly (spokesperson) =

American spokesperson (born 1996)

- Official portrait, 2025

White House Principal Deputy Press Secretary
- Incumbent
- Assumed office February 2026
- President: Donald Trump
- Press Secretary: Karoline Leavitt; Katie Zacharia
- Preceded by: Harrison Fields

Personal details
- Born: 1996 (age 29–30)
- Party: Republican
- Education: Auburn University (BA); George Washington University (MA)

Anna Kelly (born 1996) is an American spokesperson who has served as the White House principal deputy press secretary since February 2026.

== Early life and education ==
Anna Kelly was born in 1996. Kelly graduated from Auburn University with a bachelor's degree in political science in 2017 and later earned a master's in political management from George Washington University. Kelly applied as a White House intern in the first Trump administration in her senior year. She won the Miss State Fair of Virginia in 2019.

== Career ==
=== Spokesperson work (2020–2024) ===
By May 2020, Kelly had become a spokesperson for Donald Trump's 2020 presidential campaign in Wisconsin. Following the election, she was the communications director of the Republican Party of Wisconsin from January 2021 to August 2022. By October 2022, she had become a spokesperson for Tim Michels, the Republican candidate in that year's Wisconsin gubernatorial election; by July 2023, a spokesperson for Wisconsin representative Derrick Van Orden; and by January 2024 was national press secretary for the Republican National Committee. After Trump won the 2024 presidential election, Kelly became a spokesperson for his presidential transition.

=== White House Office of the Press Secretary (2025–present) ===
On January 25, 2025, Trump named Kelly as a White House deputy press secretary. By February 2026, she had become the White House principal deputy press secretary. Kelly was one of several aides who accompanied Trump on his visit to China in May. After Karoline Leavitt, the White House press secretary, announced that she would resign in August, Kelly was considered a possible candidate to succeed her. (Note: Attributed to multiple references:) According to Politico, Kelly had been suggested as a candidate internally.
