= Independent: A Look Inside a Broken White House, Outside the Party Lines =

2025 book by Karine Jean-Pierre

- Author: Karine Jean-Pierre
- Language: English
- Subject: Presidency of Joe Biden
- Genre: Political memoir
- Publisher: Legacy Lit
- Publication date: October 21, 2025
- Pages: 180
- ISBN: 1538777088

Independent: A Look Inside a Broken White House, Outside the Party Lines is a 2025 book by Karine Jean-Pierre, the White House press secretary during the Joe Biden administration.

It details Biden's choice not to run for reelection and advocates for a new approach to politics in the United States outside the two-party system. The book was published on October 21, 2025.
