= Excellent Sheep =

2015 social criticism book by William Deresiewicz

- Author: William Deresiewicz
- Subject: Philosophy of education, higher education, general sociology
- Published: 2015 (Free Press)
- Pages: 256
- ISBN: 9781476702728

Excellent Sheep: The Miseducation of the American Elite and the Way to a Meaningful Life is a 2015 book of social criticism on the role of elite colleges in American society written by William Deresiewicz and published by Free Press. Deresiewicz addresses the pressure of succeeding under which students are put by their parents and by society, considering more particularly the ones that are planning to attend Ivy League universities.
