= William Deresiewicz =

American writer (born 1964)

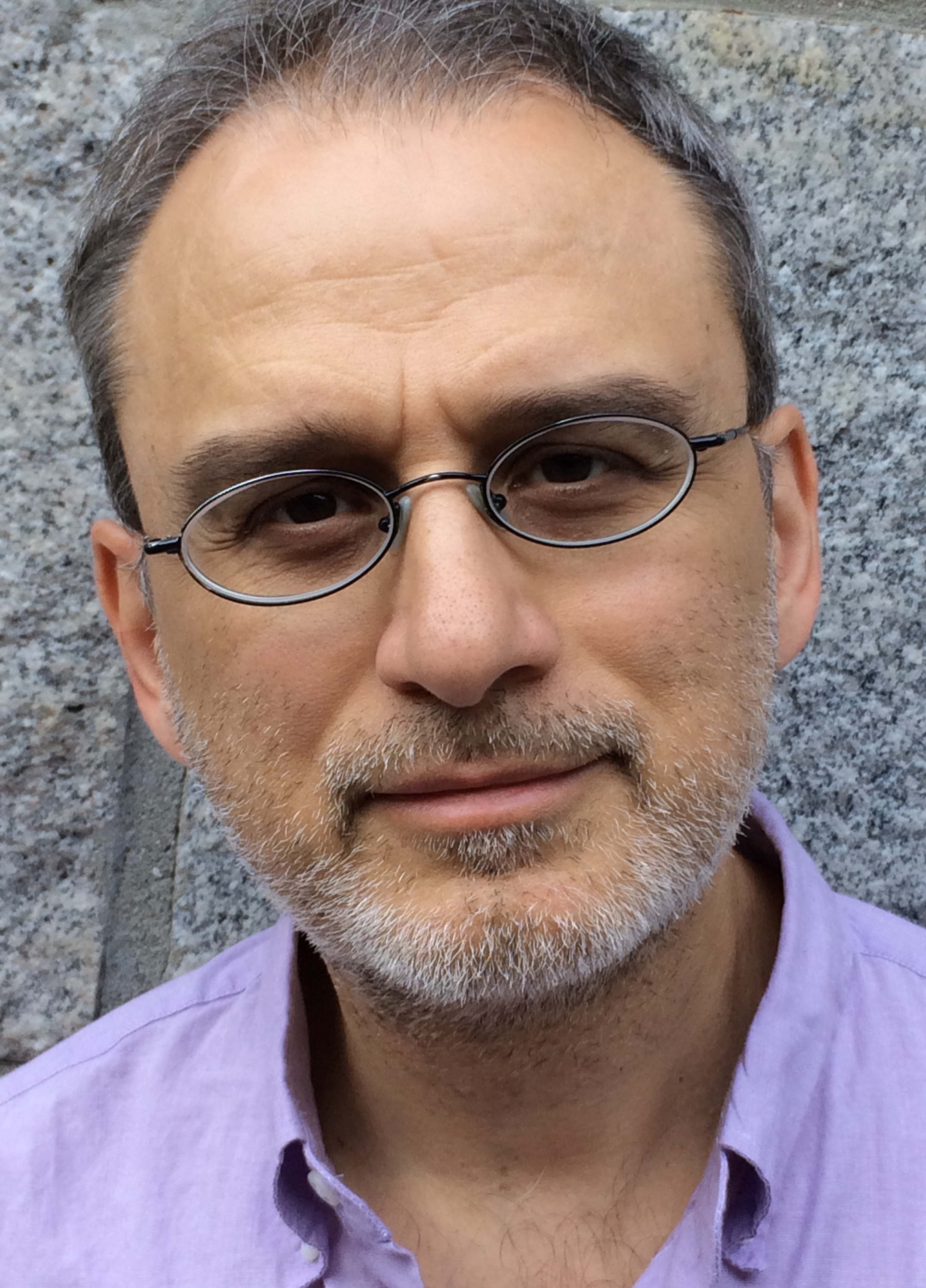
- Born: 1964 (age 61–62); Englewood, New Jersey, U.S.
- Education: Columbia University (BA, MSJ, PhD)
- Occupations: Literary critic, author, essayist

William Deresiewicz (/dəˈrɛzəwɪts/ də-REZ-ə-wits; born 1964) is an American author, essayist, and literary critic, who taught English at Yale University from 1998 to 2008. He is the author of A Jane Austen Education (2011), Excellent Sheep (2014), The Death of the Artist (2020), and The End of Solitude: Selected Essays on Culture and Society (2022).

His criticism directed to a popular audience has appeared in The Nation, The American Scholar, The New Republic, The New York Times, The Atlantic, and Harper's.

== Early life and education ==
Deresiewicz was born in 1964 in Englewood, New Jersey. His father, Herbert Deresiewicz, emigrated from Czechoslovakia and was a professor of mechanical engineering at Columbia School of Engineering and Applied Science. He grew up in a Jewish home and attended a yeshiva high school. He has described himself as being "thrown out" of the high school and has imagined that he might have been charged with "gross insubordination and incipient atheism". He graduated as a National Merit Scholarship Program finalist from Dwight Morrow High School in 1981.

Deresiewicz received his B.A. in biology and psychology (1985), his master's in journalism (1987), and Ph.D. in English (1998) from Columbia University.

== Career ==
In 1998, Deresiewicz joined the faculty of Yale University. He taught courses in modern British fiction, Great Books, Indian fiction, and writing, among other areas. He left academia in 2008 after being denied tenure and became a full-time writer. In 2012, he was awarded the Nona Balakian Citation for Excellence in Reviewing of the National Book Critics Circle.

His All Points blog appeared on the American Scholar website from March 2011 to September 2013.

== Works ==
=== A Jane Austen Education ===
In this memoir of a sort, Deresiewicz admits that he was initially resistant to reading 19th-century British fiction. Soon, though, he discovered that Austen's novels are valuable tools in the journey towards becoming an adult.

Deresiewicz juxtaposes his reading of Jane Austen with insight into his own life. For example, the reader learns about his controlling father, a series of girlfriends that come and go, and the struggles of being raised in a religious household.

=== "The Disadvantages of an Elite Education" and Excellent Sheep ===
In the summer of 2008, Deresiewicz published a controversial essay for The American Scholar titled "The Disadvantages of an Elite Education." In it, he criticizes the Ivy League and other elite colleges and universities for supposedly coddling their students and discouraging independent thought. He claims that elite institutions produce students who are unable to communicate with people who don't have the same backgrounds as themselves, noting as the first example his own inability to talk to his plumber. Deresiewicz then uses Al Gore and John Kerry, graduates of Harvard and Yale (respectively), as examples of politicians who are out of touch with the lives of most Americans.

The article became the groundwork for Deresiewicz's book Excellent Sheep: The Miseducation of the American Elite and the Way to a Meaningful Life (2014). This work had a mixed response. Dwight Garner, writing for the New York Times daily book review, praised it as "packed full of what [Deresiewicz] wants more of in American life: passionate weirdness." He characterized Deresiewicz as "a vivid writer, a literary critic whose headers tend to land in the back corner of the net," one whose "indictment arrives on wheels: He takes aim at just about the entirety of upper-middle-class life in America." Other responses, however, were more critical. In the New York Times Sunday book review, Anthony Grafton conceded that "much of his dystopian description rings true" but argued that "the coin has another side, one that Deresiewicz rarely inspects...Professors and students have agency. They use the structures they inhabit in creative ways that are not dreamt of in Deresiewicz’s philosophy, and that are more common and more meaningful than the 'exceptions' he allows." In the New Yorker, Nathan Heller was critical from another corner, arguing that the "quandaries" Deresiewicz describes are "distinctly middle-class". Heller says that Deresiewicz argues the liberal arts "will help students hone their 'moral imagination,'" but "The advice seems cheap. When an impoverished student at Stanford, the first in his family to go to college, opts for a six-figure salary in finance after graduation, a very different but equally compelling kind of 'moral imagination' may be at play. (Imagine being able to pay off your loans and never again having to worry about keeping a roof over your family’s heads.)" Despite this mixed critical response, the book was a New York Times bestseller.

=== "Solitude and Leadership" ===
In October 2009, Deresiewicz delivered a speech titled "Solitude and Leadership" to the plebe class at the United States Military Academy at West Point. It was later published in The American Scholar and went viral online. In it, he makes the case that leadership entails more than just success and accomplishment. Citing observations he made of students at Yale and Columbia, Deresiewicz discusses the ubiquity of "world-class hoop jumpers" who "can climb the greasy pole of whatever hierarchy they decide to attach themselves to." Instead, he argues, true leaders (such as General David Petraeus) are those who are able to step outside the cycle of achievement and hoop jumping in order to think for themselves. Deresiewicz claims that solitude is essential to becoming a leader.

=== The Death of the Artist ===
In 2020, Deresiewicz published The Death of the Artist: How Creators Are Struggling to Survive in the Age of Billionaires and Big Tech on how artists sustain themselves in the Information Age.

=== The End of Solitude ===
The End of Solitude: Selected Essays on Culture and Society was published in August 2022.

== Personal life ==
Deresiewicz lives in Portland, Oregon.
