= Tracey Schmitt =

American political communications strategist

- Born: United States
- Other name: Tracey Schmitt Lintott
- Education: University of Southern California
- Occupation: Political communications strategist
- Employer: CGCN Group

Tracey Schmitt (also known as Tracey Schmitt Lintott) is an American political communications strategist, crisis communications specialist, and public affairs executive. She served as National Press Secretary for the Republican National Committee (RNC) from 2005 to 2008 and held senior communications roles in multiple U.S. presidential campaigns, including the George W. Bush 2004 presidential campaign and the John McCain 2008 presidential campaign. She later worked in the private sector, including as Senior Vice President of Global Public Affairs at Emergent BioSolutions, and is the founder of the communications firm Matador. She is currently a senior partner at CGCN Group, following the merger of her firm Matador with CGCN in 2021.

== Education ==
Schmitt graduated from the University of Southern California's Annenberg School for Communication and Journalism in 1999.

== Career ==
=== Political career ===
After graduating from USC, Schmitt worked as the surrogate television booker on the first Bush campaign in Austin, Texas and later in Tallahassee, Florida, coordinating with cable television networks during the Florida Recount. Following a stint on the President's transition team, Schmitt served as a communications aide in the Bush Administration, working in the White House Office of Global Communications. She was involved in coordinating international media outreach following the September 11 attacks.

Schmitt later served as a spokesperson for the Bush–Cheney 2004 re-election campaign. She also worked as a regional spokesperson in Western battleground states during the campaign.

Following the 2004 election, Schmitt served as National Press Secretary for the 55th Presidential Inaugural Committee.

From 2005 to 2008, Schmitt served as National Press Secretary for the Republican National Committee, acting as a principal spokesperson on national political issues. She also appeared in broadcast interviews as an RNC spokesperson during the 2006 United States elections.

In 2008, Schmitt served as Deputy Communications Director and traveling press secretary to vice presidential nominee Sarah Palin during the McCain-Palin campaign.

=== Private sector career ===
After 2008, Schmitt transitioned to the private sector, advising various executives on communications, public affairs, and government relations. She served as Senior Vice President of Global Public Affairs at Emergent BioSolutions, where she led public affairs, investor communications, and other functions. In 2018, she founded Matador, a public affairs and communications firm.

Schmitt served as Executive Director of the EASE Alliance, where she advocated for ERISA Access for the Self-Employed.

In 2021, Matador merged with CGCN Group, a Republican-aligned public affairs and lobbying firm. Following the merger, Schmitt became a senior partner at CGCN.

Schmitt has also contributed various opinion articles to The New York Times.

== Board service ==
Schmitt has served on the board of the National Press Foundation, as well as Hortons Kids.
