= White House Office of the Press Secretary =

Information provider to the U.S. president, White House staff, and the media

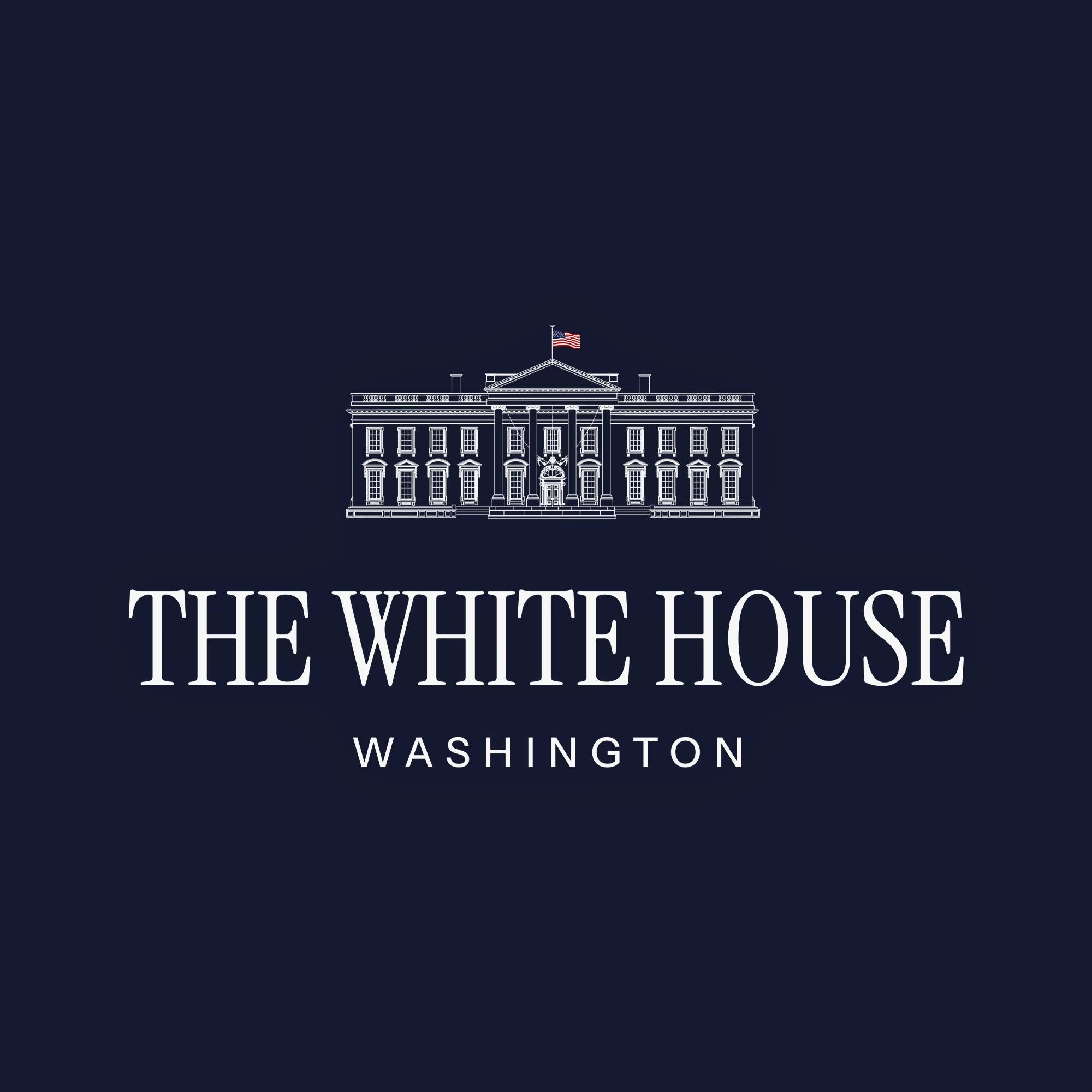

Office overview
- Formed: 1929
- Type: Office
- Headquarters: White House
- Employees: About 30
- Parent Office: White House Office
- Website: www.whitehouse.gov/briefings-statements/

The White House Office of the Press Secretary, or the Press Office, is responsible for gathering and disseminating information to three principal groups: the president, the White House staff, and the media. The office is headed by the White House press secretary, and is part of the White House Office, which is a subunit of the Executive Office of the President.

The White House Office of the Press Secretary deals with the daily press needs of the president and manages their relationship with the news media. The Office of the Press Secretary deals with the daily press needs of the president and manages their relationship with news organizations, while the Office of Communications deals with strategic planning of how the president's statements will be released to the public. The leader of this office must be stable and usually serves for a relatively long amount of time. This person gives information to journalists from the president in different formal and informal manners. Success in this position, and for the office, depends on the information given to the Office of the Press Secretary journalists, the president, and White House staff.

One example of the type of documentation that comes out of the Office of the Press Secretary is memoranda about different laws and policies. In 2009, President Obama's Office of the Press Secretary released a memorandum on the Freedom of Information Act. It stated that "the government should not keep information confidential merely because public officials might be embarrassed by disclosure, because errors and failures might be revealed, or because of speculative or abstract fears." The Office of the Press Secretary is also responsible for writing statements for the current Press Secretary that are published on the White House website. An example of a statement was published by the Trump White House on October 19, 2018, about the United States Health Security National Action Plan (the Plan). It will help the "United States Government prepare for and respond to public health emergencies."

== Function ==
The Press Office is responsible for providing support and information to the national and international media regarding the president's beliefs, activities and actions. It works alongside the Office of Communications in crafting and espousing the administration's message.

== Key staff ==
- Assistant to the President & Press Secretary: TBD
- Special Assistant to the President & Principal Deputy Press Secretary: Anna Kelly
- Deputy Assistant to the President & Press Advisor: vacant
- Special Assistant to the President & Senior Deputy Press Secretary: Vacant
- Deputy Press Secretary: Vacant
- Deputy Press Secretary: Taylor Rogers
- Assistant Press Secretary: Micah Stopperich
- Assistant Press Secretary: David Ingle
- Assistant Press Secretary: Allison Schuster
- Assistant Press Secretary: Olivia Wales
- Regional Press Secretary: Liz Huston
