= Alaska Public Safety Commissioner dismissal =

July 2008 dismissal of Walt Monegan

The Alaska Public Safety Commissioner dismissal, also known as Troopergate, involves the possibly illegal July 2008 dismissal of the Alaskan Public Safety Commissioner Walt Monegan by Republican Governor Sarah Palin. A complaint alleged that Palin dismissed Monegan because he did not fire Alaskan State Trooper Mike Wooten, who was in a bitter divorce with Palin's sister, Molly McCann.

On October 10, 2008, the twelve-member bipartisan Alaska Legislative Council hired investigator Stephen Branchflower to investigate whether Palin had dismissed Monegan for not firing Wooten. The Branchflower Report found that Palin had violated the Alaska Executive Branch Ethics Act covering state executive employees, and released it to the public.

Under Alaska law, the state's three-member State Personnel Board, not the Legislative Council, decides whether a governor has violated the ethics laws. On November 3, 2008, the bipartisan Personnel Board, all of whom had been appointed by Palin, released the findings of its own investigation which concluded that Palin did not violate any ethics laws. No action was ever taken.

== Origin of the conflict ==
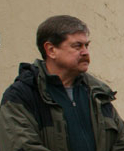
Walt Monegan, 2007

Sarah Palin, who in late August became the Republican vice presidential nominee in the 2008 United States presidential election, said that she reassigned commissioner Walt Monegan because of performance-related issues. Monegan said that his forced resignation may have been tied to his reluctance to fire Mike Wooten, an Alaska State Trooper who is also Palin's ex-brother-in-law. Monegan said that the Governor herself, her husband, and members of her staff as well as the state's Attorney General, had contacted him numerous times regarding Wooten. At the time Palin dismissed Monegan, Wooten was involved in a custody battle with his former wife, Molly McCann, Palin's sister.

Palin denied that there had been any pressure on Monegan to fire Wooten, either from herself or from anyone in her administration. In mid-August, Palin acknowledged that "pressure could have been perceived to exist, although I have only now become aware of it." She also apologized to Alaskans for what she called "this distraction."

Before Palin became governor, she and other members of her family had made various allegations of misconduct against Wooten. An internal investigation upheld some charges and rejected others. On March 1, 2006 the chief of the Alaska state police issued a letter of reprimand to Wooten, and he served a five-day suspension as penalty. After Palin became governor in December 2006, she, her husband Todd Palin, and various aides had further contacts with Monegan about Wooten. Monegan told both Sarah Palin and Todd Palin that the disciplinary proceeding against Wooten was concluded and could not be reopened.

Palin was investigated by an independent investigator, hired by a unanimous vote of a bipartisan committee of the Alaska Legislature, "to investigate the circumstances ... surrounding [Monegan's termination], and potential abuses of power and/or improper actions by members of the executive branch." Palin denied any wrongdoing. Democratic state Senator Hollis French, who is overseeing the investigation, stated the report will "likely be damaging" to the Palin administration, and may be an October surprise. In response to those remarks by French, Republican state Senator John Coghill pushed an unsuccessful effort to have French removed from managing the investigation.

Todd Palin did not honor a September 2008 subpoena to appear in court to testify about his role in Troopergate. Two other key witnesses also failed to appear, and all three were originally referred to the full Alaska Senate for contempt. These contempt charges were not addressed until the state legislature met in January 2009, when the legislature had several options including physically bringing the witnesses in, imposing jail time, and levying fines. With the refusals to testify, Senator Hollis French, the Democrat chosen to oversee the charges, moved forward with the investigation.

Palin's attorney general announced on October 5, 2008, that seven state employees would honor subpoenas to testify in the legislative investigation of the Troopergate affair.

On October 10, 2008, the Alaska Legislative Council unanimously voted to release, without endorsing, the Branchflower investigative report which found that Sarah Palin "abused her power as governor [in] attempting to get Trooper Wooten fired."

== State Trooper Mike Wooten ==
=== Background ===
In 1999, Sarah Palin's sister Molly McCann and Mike Wooten began dating. In 2000, Palin wrote a character reference for Wooten. In 2001, Wooten became an Alaska State Trooper. Also in 2001, McCann and Wooten got married. In January 2005, they were separated.

=== Divorce filing and police complaint ===
On April 11, 2005, McCann filed for divorce from Wooten. That day a judge granted a Domestic Violence Protection Order (DVPO) against Wooten. The same day, McCann's father Chuck Heath phoned police to inform them about the DVPO.

Also that day, police spoke with McCann. She said Wooten had threatened to shoot her father if he hired an attorney to help in her divorce. McCann said that although Wooten "has never physically abused her," he "acts very intimidating." She also accused him of using illegal testosterone supplements, drunk driving, and threatening to "take down" Palin if she got involved. McCann said she was "scared" of what Wooten "would do when he finds out she has hired an attorney."

=== Police investigation into allegations ===
Based on McCann's complaint, the Alaska State Troopers began an investigation into the claims made, interviewing more than fifteen witnesses.

In May 2005, Sarah Palin told police that she and her son Track overheard a death threat against her father (Heath), in February 2005, when McCann allowed her to listen in on an argument through a phone line (speakerphone).

Palin said she had not called police at that time because she did not want to put Wooten's career in jeopardy, and the situation had not progressed to physical violence. On August 10, 2005, Palin sent an email to Col. Julia Grimes, head of the Alaska State Troopers, urging that Wooten be dismissed and giving more details about the alleged death threat. The email from Palin to Grimes said that the February 2005 threat by Wooten to shoot Heath came after McCann had accused Wooten of attending an event with another woman. In the email, Palin described Wooten as "a loose cannon" and "a ticking timebomb," and said that failing to fire Wooten "would lead a rational person to believe there is a problem inside the organization."

As a result of the email, Palin was interviewed again by state troopers on August 18, 2005. During this interview, she stated that she did not warn her father of the death threat until two weeks after it was made; she explained the delay by saying that Wooten had no reason to shoot Heath. According to Heath himself, the delay was a month: "Heath stated that his daughters didn't report the incident to him until a month later."

=== Divorce proceedings ===
On May 9, a court hearing was held regarding the DVPO. At this hearing the DVPO was quashed because McCann's counsel was unable to produce evidence of any acts of physical or implied violence.

In October 2005, the divorce went to trial. During the trial, Judge John Suddock expressed puzzlement at the efforts of McCann's family to get Wooten fired, since it would harm his earning capacity and damage his ability to pay child support. Judge Suddock said "it appears for the world that Ms. McCann and her family have decided to take off for the guy's livelihood -- that the bitterness of whatever who did what to whom has overridden good judgment." A representative for the Alaska State Trooper's union testified that the union viewed the dozen complaints filed by McCann and her family against Wooten as "not job-related" and "harassment." Judge Suddock repeatedly warned McCann and her family to stop "disparaging" Wooten's reputation or risk the judge granting Wooten custody of the children. At a court hearing in October 2005, Judge Suddock said "disparaging will not be tolerated—it is a form of child abuse ... relatives cannot disparage either. If occurs [sic] the parent needs to set boundaries for their relatives."

In the divorce decree that was granted on January 31, 2006, Judge Suddock expressed concern about continued criticism by McCann's family towards Wooten and noted that he would pay particular attention to problems raised by a custody investigator. Legal disputes between Wooten and McCann over custody, child support and visitation rights continued through 2007 and 2008.

=== Results of internal police investigation ===
On October 29, 2005, Sgt. Wall issued a Memorandum of Findings describing the results of his investigation.

==== Death threat ====
Wall's investigation report dated October 29, 2005 found that Wooten violated internal policy, but not the law, in making a death threat against Molly McCann's father Heath on February 17, 2005. Molly McCann, Sarah Palin and Track Palin said that he made the threat. Wooten said that he didn't make the threat. Wall decided that he had in fact done so. Wall concluded that the death threat was not a crime because Wooten did not threaten the father directly; therefore, Wall deemed the threat to be a violation of trooper policy rather than a violation of criminal law. Although the death threat was listed as a violation of trooper policy OPM 101.070(A) Unbecoming Conduct and OPM 101.070(B) Personal Conduct in the Memorandum of Findings, it was not mentioned at all in the suspension letter sent to Wooten by Col. Grimes on March 1, 2006.

==== Moose hunt ====
The investigation found that Wooten had committed a hunting violation in shooting a moose without a permit: he had been out hunting with McCann in September 2003 and had shot the animal himself even though their permit was in McCann's name only. According to subsequent news reports, McCann had obtained the permit but balked at killing the moose herself, so she handed the gun to her then-husband, who shot the animal.

==== Taser incident ====
Wooten was also found to have violated department policy in using a Taser on his then 11-year-old stepson in 2003. He told investigators that he did so "in a training capacity" after the child had asked to be tased. In a September 2008 newspaper interview, Wooten said that he set the Taser to "test" mode, meaning that it was on low power. In a statement to police, the boy said "he wanted to be tased to show that he's not a mommy's boy in front of Bristol [his cousin, Palin's daughter]. Following being tased he went upstairs to tell his mother that he was fine." In a statement to police, Molly McCann said "she was up stairs giving a bath to the kids ... Mike was going to show Payton what it feels like and she told Mike that he better not." According to Molly's account, she remained upstairs during the incident.

Although the Taser incident happened in 2003, it was not reported to police until on or after April 11, 2005, the day McCann filed for divorce. On June 6, 2005, a police investigator asked Bristol why they "waited so long and brought the incident up after two years." Bristol said "because of the divorce and stuff".

==== Alcohol-related allegations ====
The investigation initially cleared Wooten on all the alcohol-related charges, but Grimes overturned that result and found that Wooten did, "Take [an] open beer with him when he drove away in his trooper vehicle," on one occasion in the summer of 2004, violating both the law and internal trooper policy. Wooten was not on duty; he was wearing "civilian attire." And he "drove approximately one mile to his residence." Because Wooten "was a member of the SERT [SWAT] team ... he [was allowed to] use his State vehicle for personal use." The only witnesses to this event were close friends of Sarah Palin's father: "Adrian Lane was a student of Chuck Heath's in Idaho when he was a child and they have been close friends ever since." This is apparently why the original Memorandum of Findings treated this allegation as "Not Sustained." Wooten denied this allegation.

==== Other charges ====
Wooten was cleared of numerous other allegations made by McCann and her family, including that he had taken illegal steroid and testosterone supplements, that he had physically assaulted McCann, and that he had illegally shot a wolf from a helicopter.

Aside from the alleged death threat against Heath, Sarah and Molly had also accused Wooten of making threats that he would "bring down" Sarah and her family. Sarah Palin had no first-hand knowledge of these threats; she heard about them via Molly. Molly told police she understood Wooten to mean that he could use his position as a trooper to make life difficult for Sarah. Wooten denied making this threat. The police investigation treated this allegation as "Not Sustained."

=== Suspension of Wooten ===
Based on the internal investigation findings, Grimes announced on March 1, 2006 that she would suspend Wooten for ten days. In announcing the suspension, Grimes referred to the Taser, moose and beer incidents, and also to seven other negative actions in Wooten's personnel file, such as failing to use turn signals. She did not mention the alleged death threat or any other allegations regarding threats. She concluded that "[t]he record clearly indicates a serious and concentrated pattern of unacceptable and at times, illegal activity occurring over a lengthy period, which establishes a course of conduct totally at odds with the ethics of our profession". After a union protest, the suspension was reduced to five days, and Grimes warned Wooten he would be fired if he committed any further misconduct.

== Contacts between Governor's office and Wooten's supervisors ==
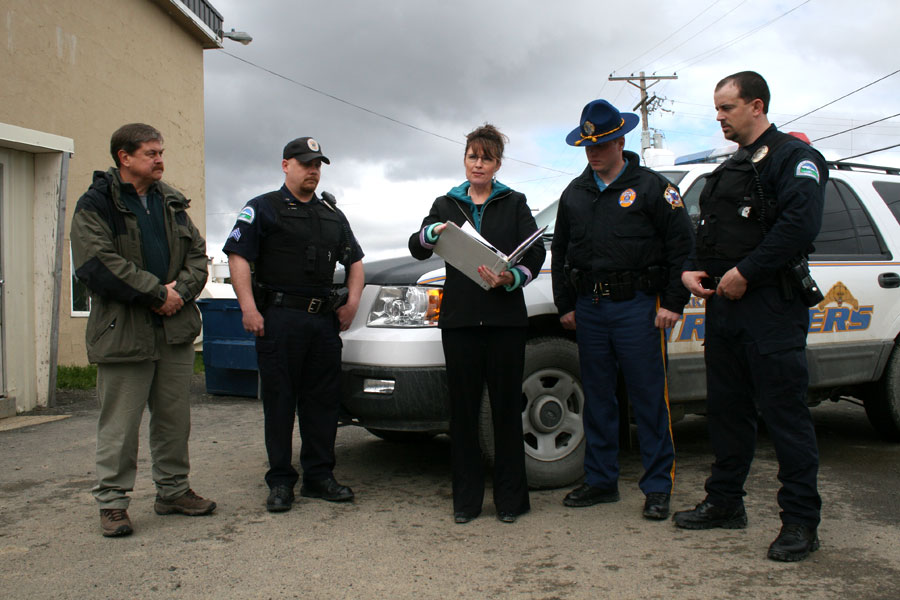
Palin with Monegan and troopers in 2007

In early December 2006, Palin took office as Governor of Alaska and appointed Walter C. Monegan III to be Public Safety Commissioner, a cabinet position. Monegan is a former police chief of Anchorage and son of Walter C. Monegan, Jr. According to the investigator hired by the state legislature, "Right about that time, a little after the swearing in," someone from Palin's office called Monegan's office to schedule a meeting between Monegan and Todd Palin, the governor's husband.

According to Monegan, the meeting took place in the Governor's office on January 4, 2007, with only Monegan and Todd Palin present. Palin asked Monegan to look into the Wooten affair. He gave Monegan various records, including material from a private investigator hired by the Palin family. Palin said that he disagreed with the five-day suspension, as inadequate and insufficient, and accused Wooten of a variety of transgressions, including drunken driving and child abuse. He asked Monegan to revisit the matter in light of some additional evidence he was providing. Monegan agreed to do that. He detailed some staff for the review, who made a page-by-page comparison with the investigation that had been done earlier, and told Monegan that there was nothing new. Monegan then told Todd Palin that there was nothing he could do as the case was closed. The troopers operate under a union contract that restricts the circumstances under which a trooper can be fired.

According to Monegan, Governor Palin raised the matter with him personally twice, in January and February, and then kept raising the matter indirectly through e-mails, though she did not again bring it up directly. In an email sent to Monegan on February 7, 2007 about a proposed bill to require 99-year sentences for police officers found guilty of murder, Palin mentioned Wooten as an example of an officer who violated the public trust. The email listed several examples of Wooten's alleged misbehavior. Another Palin email, dated July 17, 2007, concerned a proposed bill to keep guns out of the hands of the mentally ill. Palin wrote to Monegan that her first thoughts "went to my ex-brother-in-law, the trooper, who threatened to kill my dad yet was not even reprimanded by his bosses and still to this day carries a gun, of course." A spokesperson for the McCain-Palin campaign says that Palin's contacts with Monegan were only to alert him to potential threats to her family.

Monegan also has said he got telephone calls from three Palin appointees: her then-chief of staff, Mike Tibbles; Commissioner Annette Kreitzer of the Department of Administration; and Attorney General Talis Colberg. Colberg said he called after Todd Palin asked him about "the process" for handling death threats made by state troopers against the first family. Monegan told Colberg the matter had been handled, and Colberg reported back to Todd Palin that nothing more could be done. In mid-August 2008, the Alaska Attorney General's inquiry reported that Palin's staff had made about two dozen contacts with public safety officials about Wooten, in 2007 and 2008, with more than half initiated by Tibbles.

In April 2007, Todd Palin told the Anchorage Daily News he had met once with Wooten's supervisor, Colonel Audie Holloway, to give her pictures of Wooten driving a snowmobile when he was out on a worker's compensation claim. Diane Kiesel, Alaska state personnel director, also called Holloway about the snowmobile incident.

On November 19, 2007, a meeting was called by Mike Tibbles, at the time Palin's chief of staff, to discuss the process of how Wooten had returned to work after a worker's compensation injury. Present were Kevin Brooks, the deputy commissioner of the Department of Administration, Nicki Neal, director of the Personnel Division, and Diane Kiesel, former director of Personnel and Labor Relations.

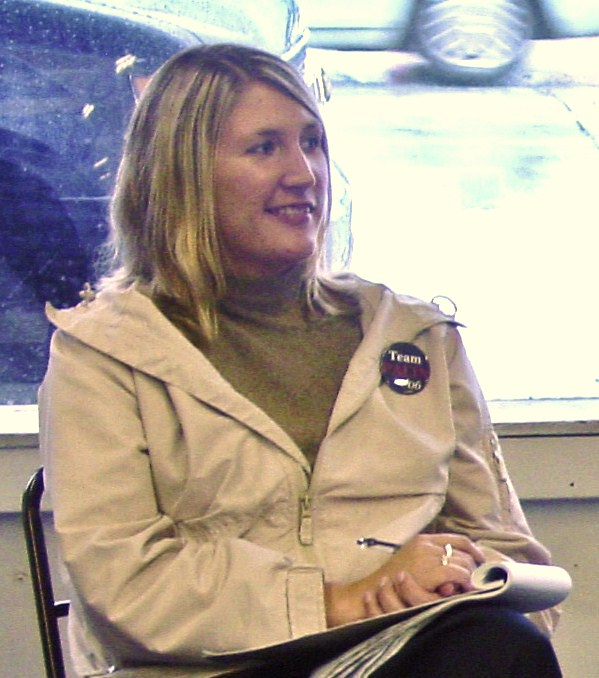
Ivy Frye, special assistant to Palin, subpoenaed in Troopergate.

On February 29, 2008, Frank Bailey, the governor's director of boards and commissions, made a phone call to trooper Lt. Rodney Dial, the state troopers' liaison to the legislature. The Public Safety Department recorded the call, as it does routinely, and the Palin administration released an audiotape of it on August 13. In it, Bailey made several accusations against Wooten, including that he lied on his application to become a trooper. He was recorded saying "Todd and Sarah are scratching their heads, 'why on earth hasn't, why is this guy still representing the department?' " and "I'm telling you honestly, you know, she really likes Walt [Monegan] a lot, but on this issue, she feels like it's, she doesn't know why there is absolutely no action for a year on this issue. It's very, very troubling to her and the family. I could definitely relay that." Bailey said in an interview on August 13 that no one had asked him to make the call and he didn't know why he indicated in the call that he was speaking on behalf of the Palins. A transcript of the call is available.

Cell records show that Todd Palin spoke to Palin aide Ivy Frye three times on the afternoon of February 28, the day before Bailey's conversation with Dial. About three hours after the last call, the first of ten emails began to circulate between Ivy Frye, Sarah Palin, her husband Todd, Bailey, Administration Commissioner Annette Kreitzer, Deputy Chief of Staff Randy Ruaro and Palin aide Kris Perry. The exchanges continued overnight and into the morning of Bailey's phone call.

Shortly before the annual celebration of Police Memorial Day on May 15, 2008, Commissioner Monegan dropped off a color photograph at Governor Palin's Anchorage office with a request that she sign and present it at the ceremony. The photograph was of an Alaska State Trooper, dressed in a formal uniform, saluting. He was standing in front of the police memorial located in front of the crime lab at AST headquarters in Anchorage, partially obscured by a flagpole. The picture to be signed by the Governor was to be used as a poster to be displayed in various Trooper Detachments around the state.

Shortly after he returned to his office from dropping off the photograph, he received a call from Kris Perry, Governor Palin's Director of her Anchorage office, who asked (according to Walt Monegan's testimony), "Why did you send a poster over here that has a picture of Mike Wooten on it?" Until that moment, Commissioner Monegan apparently never realized it was indeed a photograph of Trooper Wooten. Governor Palin canceled her appearance and sent Lieutenant Governor Parnell in her place.

At least three dozen people contacted Monegan's office over a 19-month period. Kim Peterson, Mr. Monegan's special assistant and a 31-year human resources employee of the State of Alaska, said she fielded about a dozen calls. "It was very clear that someone from the governor's office wanted him watched," she told The New York Times. Mr. Palin had called Ms. Peterson to claim that he had seen Wooten riding a snowmobile while on disability for a back injury and asked her to investigate. When Mr. Palin called back two weeks later asking for a response, Peterson told him that she could not discuss it because it was a confidential personnel matter.

Dianne Kiesel, a deputy director at the Department of Administration, called Ms. Peterson to suggest that Wooten could be reassigned to the cold-case unit or perform background checks. Ms. Peterson responded that those options would violate the union contract. Annette Kreitzer, Commissioner of the Alaskan Department of Administration, also called Monegan and Peterson about Wooten.

== Dismissal of Public Safety Commissioner Walter Monegan ==
On July 11, 2008, Palin's acting chief of staff Mike Nizich dismissed Monegan, offering him a position as executive director of the state Alcoholic Beverage Control Board, which he turned down.

In a letter to DPS employees announcing his termination, Monegan wrote that he was an at-will employee and knew his dismissal was, "A possibility ever present", and that he had been advised that the governor wanted to take DPS in a "different direction". In an interview the next day Monegan said that the dismissal had come "out of the blue" and that "[i]f the governor was upset with me for one thing or another, it had never been communicated to me."

=== Response to the dismissal of Monegan ===
The accusation that Governor Palin may have abused her power when her attempt to reassign Commissioner Walt Monegan resulted in his termination of employment appeared in the blog of Andrew Halcro on Thursday, July 17, 2008. Halcro claimed that Monegan was "fired" because of his budget battles with the governor and because he refused to fire Trooper Wooten.

Halcro's blog reported that Monegan thought he was going into the meeting to smooth over the ruffled feathers caused from when his deputy, Holloway, denied the governor's chief of security, Cocerall, an extra trooper for security at the governor's picnic. Instead he was fired. The legislators agreed to hire a special investigator to look into the issue to clear the air.

That's the only thing I can think of, if you want to get to the truth and be unbiased," said Senate President Lyda Green, a Wasilla Republican. "Otherwise, speculation just continues."

Ten days later, on July 28, 2008, the Alaska Legislative Council met and voted 12–0 to delegate their authority to the Council Chairman, Senator Elton, to hire legal services to investigate the termination of Commissioner Monegan. They named Senator Hollis French as Project Director for the contract. The report was intended that the "investigation [is] in a professional, unbiased, independent, objective manner, and... at arm's length from the political process". The investigators report was to be submitted to the Legislative Council.

Senator French hired Stephen Branchflower to conduct the investigation. The contract was signed on July 31, 2008, and Branchflower began his investigation on August 11, 2008.

=== Other responses to the dismissal of Monegan ===
On July 17, Palin said publicly that "We have [to] start recruiting. We have to start doing more than just talking about it. And taking action also." Monegan responded on July 18 that the two most recent trooper graduating classes had the most recruits in years. On July 18, Monegan suggested that his dismissal might have been related to his reluctance to fire Wooten. He said phone calls and questions from the Palin administration and the governor's husband, Todd Palin, about Wooten started shortly after Monegan was hired and continued until May or June 2008. Monegan said that Palin's acting chief of staff, Mike Nizich, told him on July 11 that he was being removed from his position because Palin wanted to take the Department of Public Safety in a different direction.

On July 18, in response to Monegan's comments, Palin released a statement:

I do not interfere with the day-to-day operations of any department. Former Commissioner Monegan was not released due to any actions or inaction related to personnel issues in his department. We had hoped the former commissioner would have stayed in state service to help fight alcohol-related crime. We offered him the position of executive director of the Alcoholic Beverage Control board and, unfortunately, he turned it down.

The statement also denied that the governor had improperly accessed Wooten's employment records, saying that "[t]o allege that I, or any member of my family, requested, received or released confidential personnel information on an Alaska State Trooper, or directed disciplinary action be taken against any employee of the Department of Public Safety, is, quite simply, outrageous. Any information regarding personnel records came from the trooper himself." Palin said "absolutely no pressure [was] ever put on Commissioner Monegan to hire or fire anybody, at any time ... no pressure was ever put on anybody to fire anybody." She also praised Monegan's replacement, saying "Commissioner Kopp shares my vision for filling vacant positions and reducing crime across the state."

In late July, former U.S. Attorney Wevley Shea, who had acted previously as an informal adviser to Palin, wrote her an unsolicited letter in which he urged her to apologize for "overreaching or perceived overreaching" to get Wooten fired, and warned that the matter could snowball into a bigger scandal. The letter said that she should fire any aides who had raised concerns with Monegan.

On August 13, Palin said specifically that her action was unrelated to Wooten. She said that Monegan was dismissed for not adequately filling state trooper vacancies and fighting alcohol abuse problems, and because he "did not turn out to be a team player on budgeting issues." Palin acknowledged that "pressure could have been perceived to exist, although I have only now become aware of it." She suspended Frank Bailey, and apologized to Alaskans:

Mr. Bailey was aware of my family's personal concerns about Trooper Wooten. It appears that he, though, tried to apply some pressure on my behalf and this was without ever discussing it with me and I apologize to Alaskans for this distraction.

On August 28, in an interview with Anchorage Daily News, Monegan said, "For the record, no one ever said fire Wooten. Not the governor. Not Todd. Not any of the other staff. What they said directly was more along the lines of 'This isn't a person that we would want to be representing our state troopers.' " He later added that he had resisted pressure from the governor and her husband to re-open the case against Wooten.

In an August interview with The New Yorker, Palin blamed Monegan for failing to address alcohol abuse in rural Alaska. According to the New Yorker article, Palin stated that she didn't fire Monegan, but rather "asked him to drop everything else and single-mindedly take on the state's drinking problem, as the director of the Alcoholic Beverage Control Board." Palin characterized the job offered to Monegan as "commensurate in salary pretty much—ten thousand dollars less", but said that Monegan didn't want it, so he quit.

In September, in a televised interview with Charles Gibson of ABC News, Palin reiterated her position that she had dismissed Monegan because of his job performance and that neither she nor her husband pressured him to fire Wooten. Palin said "I never pressured him to hire or fire anybody ... I know that Todd, too, never pressured ... Monegan." In response, Monegan said: "She's not telling the truth when she told ABC neither she nor her husband pressured me to fire Trooper Wooten. And she's not telling the truth to the media about her reasons for firing me."

Monegan has made a number of other statements alleging that he had been pressured to fire Wooten. "There was pressure for that, yes." "There were numerous contacts by the governor, her husband, by her staff that basically said that Trooper Wooten was not an acceptable example of an Alaska state trooper." "The fact that they tried for better than a year while I was there is kind of indicative that somebody was trying to pressure something."

On September 2, 2008, "a senior strategist in the McCain campaign" said "the man who was fired has said on the record that he was never pressured by the governor or the governor's husband on the issue of firing Trooper Wooten."

On September 15, 2008, McCain/Palin campaign spokeswoman Meg Stapleton held a news conference at which she accused Monegan of "egregious insubordination", "obstructionist conduct" and a "brazen refusal" to follow proper channels for requesting money. Asked why someone with a history of insubordination would be offered the leadership of the Alaska Alcoholic Beverage Control Board, Stapleton said that without having to deal with a budget, Monegan would be able to focus on alcohol abuse issues. She added that Palin "respects the fact that he [Monegan] was respected in the community."

Monegan's successor, Charles Kopp, testified that during the July 9, 2008, phone call seeing if he was still interested the commissioner's job, he asked why Monegan was leaving, and Frank Bailey told him that Governor Palin was upset by the episode where she was asked to autograph Wooten's photograph.

== Investigations and reviews ==
The Alaska Legislative Council is a bipartisan body of state House and Senate members who can convene to make decisions when the full legislature is not in session. As of July 2008 it was made up of four Democrats and eight Republicans. On July 28, 2008, the Legislative Council voted 12–0 to hire an independent investigator to investigate Palin and her staff for possible abuse of power or improper actions surrounding Monegan's dismissal. A retired state prosecutor, Stephen Branchflower, was named as the investigator. Branchflower was awarded a three-month contract, which began on August 1. In the same unanimous vote, the Council also appointed Sen. French (D), a former state prosecutor, to manage Branchflower. French is Chair of the Senate Judiciary Committee.

=== Alaska Attorney General (internal investigation) ===
As a result of the announcement of a legislative investigation, Talis Colberg, the Alaskan Attorney General, and his Department of Law, began conducting an inquiry in late July at the request of the Governor. Rep. Ramras (R), chair of the House Judiciary Committee, criticized the Colberg probe. "I think it is harmful to the credibility of the administration, harmful to the process and harmful to all the parties involved ... it's just the worst possible thing to be doing." Ramras said Colberg "needs to be very careful to avoid his review having any appearance of tampering with witnesses." The findings of the review were made public on August 13.

The inquiry identified two dozen contacts by members of Palin's staff with public safety officials, concerning Wooten. Of these, only one was determined to be improper by the Attorney General's office. Palin said that she had only known about some of the two dozen contacts, and that she never asked anyone on her staff to get in touch with such officials about Wooten. Additionally, the Governor said that, "Many of these inquiries were completely appropriate. However, the serial nature of the contacts could be perceived as some kind of pressure, presumably at my direction."

In July, Palin had denied that there had been any pressure on Monegan to fire Wooten, either from herself or from anyone in her administration. Based on the Attorney General's inquiry, she said on August 13 that "I do now have to tell Alaskans that such pressure could have been perceived to exist although I have only now become aware of it."

Palin said the "most disturbing" contact found in the inquiry by the Attorney General and his office was the February 2008 phone call by Bailey to Dial. In a newspaper interview the day after the tape was released, Palin said she never asked Bailey to make the call, which she called "just wrong." She also denied that the tape showed the administration applying pressure to fire Wooten, saying "[i]f that's pressure, then (after) years in law enforcement, how do they do their job if that's perceived as pressure?" A day or two earlier, Palin had said that Bailey's call appeared as a form of pressure: "It appears that he, though, tried to apply some pressure on my behalf."

On August 19, the Governor's office announced that Bailey had been placed on paid leave, pending the outcome of the legislative investigation. Sharon Leighow, a spokesperson for the governor, said that Bailey was kept on the state payroll so Palin "can direct him to assist Mr. Branchflower, thereby fulfilling her pledge to Alaskans to cooperate fully with the investigation."

=== State Legislature investigation ===
On August 16, Hollis French said that the Palin administration has been cooperating and that subpoenas would not be necessary. In late August, French said that Palin was likely to be deposed soon in the case.

In mid-August, Palin hired a private practice lawyer, Thomas Van Flein, to defend her and her staff in the investigation; he began working on August 21. Van Flein was being paid by the State of Alaska; Attorney General Colberg was unable to represent Palin because of his involvement in the case. On August 29, Van Flein asked for all witness statements, documents and other materials collected in the course of the legislative investigation. French said, in response, that he had instructed Branchflower not to provide the letters or witness statements. On September 17, Van Flein said that he had, as of September 12, terminated his contract with the state, and was representing Todd and Sarah Palin personally. Van Flein said that the state would not be billed for any of his services since he was hired in August. Van Flein said that, after listening to Colberg's interview with Branchflower, he believes that Colberg is not a "material witness."

==== Scheduled completion date ====
Branchflower's 3-month contract that started on August 1 was originally scheduled to end on October 31, and therefore the investigation was expected to end on that date. On September 2, French said the report would "likely to be damaging to the (Palin) administration," and could be an October surprise. In response to French's statements, Republican state Senator John Coghill launched an unsuccessful attempt to have French removed from overseeing the investigation, and suggested the entire investigation ought to be canceled, saying "if this has been botched up the way it has, there's a question as to whether it should continue." French apologized: "I made some remarks I should not have made. The point to remember is I'm not doing the investigation, Steven Branchflower is. He is independently gathering the facts and he will issue the report, which he will have to defend."

On September 5 French said that rather than ending on October 31, the Friday before the election, the report would be complete by October 10. House Judiciary Chairman Ramras (R) said the reason for the earlier completion date for the report is to avoid the appearance of a last-minute "October surprise." Other Republican lawmakers also expressed support for the earlier date.

French's "October surprise" remarks were used, in part, as the basis for a lawsuit that was brought by five Republican lawmakers, in an attempt to stop the Branchflower investigation. On October 2, Superior Court Judge Peter Michalski rejected this lawsuit, and defended French's right to make those remarks: "It is expected that legislators will belong to some party and will support the positions of their party, often publicly. The legislature is, by its nature, a political branch. It would be assumed that, e.g., review of Wall Street's financiers might be founded on a strongly held and expressed belief that somebody did something wrong."

==== Initial dispute over witnesses' testimony ====
On September 1, French said the legislature would pay to fly Branchflower to wherever Sarah Palin was on the campaign trail if needed, and that Branchflower had not yet been able to set up an interview with Palin. In a letter on September 1, Van Flein indicated that Palin probably would not agree to an interview unless the legislature turned the matter over to the Personnel Board. If witnesses were not available, French said, he would ask the Senate Judiciary Committee, which he chairs, to issue subpoenas. He said that Palin needed to be interviewed sometime in September.

On September 2, the lawyer for Frank Bailey, the aide Palin suspended after a recording of his call to a trooper official came to light, canceled a deposition scheduled for September 3. The lawyer said that Van Flein, who represents Palin, informed him that there was a jurisdictional dispute that was unsettled. Bailey's lawyer also said that Bailey was ready to be deposed, and that Bailey would say that he wasn't asked by the Governor to make any calls regarding Monegan, but that the jurisdictional matter should be settled first. In response to this, Rep. Ramras (R), chair of the House Judiciary Committee, said "Alaskans should be offended, that Frank Bailey is on paid leave and will not do an interview that he already committed to with Mr. Branchflower."

On September 9, Senior Assistant Attorney General Mike Barnhill wrote to Legislative Council chair Sen. Kim Elton threatening to go to court to confirm that it was legal for the Governor to assign her staff to review personnel files. He said that, if the lawmakers agreed that this interpretation of the law was correct, the Attorney General's office "will drop its objections [to state employees testifying] and the depositions may proceed without subpoenas." On September 12, Sen. Elton agreed with Barnhill's proposal, writing that "I stipulate in my role as a chair of the Legislative Council and on behalf of the council that your interpretation of the law is correct."

==== Issue of subpoenas and response ====
On September 12, the Alaska Senate Judiciary Committee issued subpoenas to thirteen potential witnesses: Todd Palin, Ivy Frye, Randy Ruaro, Frank Bailey, John Bitney, Annette Kreitzer, Dianne Kiesel, Nicki Neal, Brad Thompson, Michael Nizich, Kris Perry, Janice Mason, and Murlene Wilkes. The Committee also authorized a subpoena for Bailey's cell-phone records.

According to Branchflower, Wilkes may have lied to him during an earlier interview, and may have had a financial incentive to cover up being pressured by the Palins to deny Wooten's worker's compensation claim. Branchflower said an employee at Wilkes' company had called a tip line and said "the governor's office wanted this claim denied." According to KTUU, "knowingly denying a worker's comp claim for false reasons is a criminal offense." Sarah Palin herself was not subpoenaed: Ramras said that it "would be disrespectful" for the committee to subpoena the governor while she was running for Vice President. The Alaska Senate Judiciary Committee, which voted to issue the subpoenas, is composed of three Republicans and two Democrats. The vote was 3-2. The subpoenas were authorized at a joint meeting of the House and Senate Judiciary Committees. The House Judiciary Committee also voted, in an advisory capacity, in favor of authorizing the subpoenas. This vote was 5-0. Those five include three Republicans and two Democrats. Two Republican members of the House Judiciary Committee were not present.

On September 16, saying that the investigation was "tainted" by manipulations from Barack Obama's supporters, a McCain-Palin spokesperson said that Palin would not cooperate with the investigator hired by the legislature. The Obama campaign said that the claim of manipulation was "complete paranoia."

On September 16, State Attorney General Talis Colberg, a Palin appointee, notified the Legislature that state employees would disobey the subpoenas issued in the course of the investigation, unless either the full Senate or the legislature as a whole voted to compel their testimony. He stated that the officials were "loyal employees subject to the supervision of the Governor" and cited Governor Palin's decision not to co-operate with the inquiry, her statement that the subpoenas were "of questionable validity," and the pending lawsuits challenging the investigation. He added that the employees were in "an untenable situation." The full Alaska legislature is not scheduled to convene until January 2009: it could not meet earlier unless a Special Session is called by Governor Palin.

In response to Attorney General Colberg's letter, Sen. Elton accused the administration of breaking an earlier agreement to allow the employees to testify. He cited several public statements by Palin or her staff pledging her cooperation, in addition to what he called the "explicit" offer in the earlier letter of September 9 to allow the testimony, provided that the administration's interpretation of the State Personnel Act was agreed upon.

Also on September 16, five GOP lawmakers from the Alaskan State Legislature filed a lawsuit in Anchorage Superior Court to end the investigation, claiming it was "unlawful, biased, partial and partisan."

On September 18, the McCain/Palin campaign announced that Todd Palin would refuse to testify because he does not believe the investigation is legitimate. State senator Bill Wielechowski said that the witnesses could not be punished for disobeying the subpoenas until the full legislature comes into session, which was scheduled to be in January 2009.

==== Allegation that the witness list was manipulated ====
As evidence of her claim that the Branchflower investigation was "tainted," McCain spokesperson Stapleton cited the removal of former Palin Chief of Staff Tibbles from the subpoena list compiled by Branchflower. Branchflower had requested a subpoena for Tibbles because Tibbles was refusing to cooperate voluntarily. Stapleton said "French's further political involvement was accidentally revealed when the investigator testified that he had deferred to French on the proper witnesses to subpoena." On October 1, the McCain campaign said "Branchflower and French were recently exposed for colluding on the issuing of subpoenas." The McCain campaign also said "in a hearing, Branchflower admits conspiring with French regarding the recipients of subpoenas."

According to House Judiciary Chairman Ramras (R), it was his idea to remove Tibbles from the list: "we did not want to put that onus -- at least this was the point of view I put forward -- I did not want to put that onus on somebody who is now excluded from state service and would not enjoy the same legal protection that has been afforded to those members of the administration."

In response to charges that the Branchflower investigation is partisan, Ramras stated that the Chairmen and Vice Chairmen of the House and Senate Judiciary Committees comprise three Republicans and one Democrat. All those four voted in favor of authorizing Branchflower's subpoenas. Ramras also mentioned "I have had a McCain sign in my front yard since August 21st, as soon as they hit town in Fairbanks." Responding to further claims of partisanship, Ramras said "the hyperbole from the truth squad [McCain campaign] is a little farfetched ... to those of us who have monitored this thing from the front-row seats, it's a misnomer."

==== Branchflower's interim status report as of September 12 ====
Subpoenas were authorized at a joint meeting of the Senate and House Judiciary Committees on September 12. Branchflower was present, and reported on the interim progress of his month-long investigation. As of September 12, Branchflower had identified 33 potential witnesses, and had taken statements from 16 witnesses. He was also working with a large amount of material that had been produced by the Colberg investigation, and turned over to him.

Branchflower said there was enough evidence in the public record to support the claim that Todd Palin was the principal critic of Trooper Wooten. Todd Palin had many contacts with DPS personnel over the last several years and made many comments about how it appeared that DPS was not doing its job because of Wooten; he wanted Wooten fired. Branchflower described Monegan's account of his meeting with Todd Palin in January 2007. Palin said Wooten's suspension was inadequate. In a legal filing in September 2008, Sarah Palin said her family didn't learn until July 2008 that Wooten had been disciplined with a suspension in 2006.

==== Status of Branchflower's subpoenas as of September 19 ====
On September 19, French issued a letter detailing the status of the thirteen witness subpoenas authorized by the Senate Judiciary Committee on September 12. As of the 19th, six of the subpoenas had been served, to Todd Palin, Ivy Frye, Ruaro, Bailey, Bitney and Wilkes. The former three failed to appear on September 19, as ordered. The latter three complied with the subpoena by providing statements to Branchflower. The cell-phone company also was served and complied by providing Bailey's records.

On September 19, French announced that Branchflower would serve subpoenas on the seven remaining witnesses (Kiesel, Kreitzer, Neal, Thompson, Nizich, Perry, and Mason), with a return date of September 26.

French's letter noted that Attorney General Colberg's office had confirmed twice, in writing, that witnesses would cooperate. Colberg cancelled that cooperation agreement on September 16. French said that various subpoenas would have been served earlier, but Branchflower had been relying on assurances that had been given by the Governor and others that witnesses would be instructed to cooperate.

==== Court upholds validity of subpoenas, witnesses state willingness to appear ====
On October 2, Superior Court Judge Peter Michalski rejected the contentions of the five Republican state legislators who had sued to block the investigation, and he also rejected Colberg's challenge to the subpoenas. In response, Colberg declined to discuss whether he would advise the subpoenaed state officials to comply with the subpoenas; he stated instead that he would need to consult with them about a possible appeal to the Alaska Supreme Court before commenting publicly.

On October 5, seven of the witnesses agreed that they would testify, leaving only the Palins' own appearance in doubt.

==== Branchflower Report and response ====
The Alaska Legislative Council investigation concluded on October 10, 2008. After a full day of deliberation, the twelve members of the legislative commission voted unanimously to release, without endorsing, the 263-page Branchflower Report. The report included four main findings:

1. Governor Sarah Palin abused her power as Governor in that her conduct violated AS 39.52.110(a) of the Ethics Act, which provides "The legislature reaffirms that each public officer holds office as a public trust, and any effort to benefit a personal or financial interest through official action is a violation of that trust."
2. Although Walt Monegan's refusal to fire Trooper Michael Wooten was not the sole reason he was fired by Governor Sarah Palin, it was likely a contributing factor to his termination as Commissioner of Public Safety. In spite of that, Governor Palin's firing of Commissioner Monegan was a proper and lawful exercise of her constitutional and statutory authority to hire and fire executive branch department heads.
3. Harbor Adjustment Service of Anchorage, and its owner Ms. Murleen Wilkes, handled Trooper Michael Wooten's workers' compensation claim properly and in the normal course of business like any other claim processed by Harbor Adjustment Service and Ms. Wilkes. Further, that he received all the workers' compensation benefits to which he was entitled.
4. The Attorney General's office failed to substantially comply with (the investigation's) August 6, 2008 written request to Governor Sarah Palin for information about the case in the form of emails.

The report concludes that Palin wrongfully allowed her husband, Todd Palin, to use state resources to pursue having Trooper Wooten fired, stating that "Palin knowingly permitted a situation to continue where impermissible pressure was placed on several subordinates in order to advance a personal agenda ..."

The report also recommended some clarifications of ethics statutes for the future. The third finding relates to evidence that Alaskan officials had informed the owner of the firm handling Wooten's worker's compensation claim that the governor wanted Wooten's claim denied. However, the report finds that the claim was handled without regard to any attempt at political pressure. The report did not recommend any sanctions or legal penalties.

Palin's attorney issued a five-page statement condemning the Branchflower report as misleading and wrong on the law. Palin responded to the report by saying, "About the Tasergate issue... I'm very very pleased to be cleared of any legal wrongdoing, any hint of any kind of unethical activity there." This statement was criticized as inconsistent with the contents of the report by the media and by Democratic state senator Kim Elton.

=== State Personnel Board investigation ===
==== Initiation ====
On September 1, Palin essentially filed an ethics complaint against herself, asking the state Personnel Board to review the case. Her lawyer asked the state legislature to drop its investigation, saying that by state law, the board had jurisdiction over ethics issues. Palin also asked that the board review the matter as an ethics complaint.

The Personnel Board is a three-member panel appointed by the governor, and confirmed by the legislature. Members serve six-year terms, and not more than two members may be of same political party. The three people on the current board were first appointed by Frank Murkowski (R), Palin's gubernatorial predecessor; Palin reappointed one member in 2008. Another member donated $400 to Palin's 2006 campaign for governor. As governor, Palin has the authority to remove members of the board, for cause. The Personnel Board hired Anchorage trial lawyer Timothy J. Petumenos, a registered Democrat who contributed to Palin's opponent for governor in 2006, as its investigator. In 2002, his firm handled the $15 million bond issue for Wasilla's hockey complex, a pet project of then-mayor Palin.

In response to the request from Palin's attorney, French responded that "We're going to proceed. If they want to proceed, that's perfectly within their right but it doesn't diminish our right to do so."

On September 3, Nicki Neal, director of the state Division of Personnel and Labor Relations, said that the board would meet soon in executive session—closed to the public—to begin its work. Palin had asked for the ethics case to be open. Neal said she would check into how that relates to the board meetings. Neal is one of the persons listed as a potential witness in the Branchflower investigation.

==== Proceedings ====
On September 15, 2008, Palin's attorney Van Flein filed arguments with the Personnel Board arguing that there was "no probable cause" to pursue the complaint that Palin earlier filed against herself. The filing accused Monegan of "an escalating pattern of insubordination on budget and other key policy issues", including a press conference appearance with Senator French, who is leading the legislature's investigation. Van Flein also argued that, even if Palin had ordered Monegan to fire Wooten, that would not violate Alaska's Ethics Act "because the public generally shares a common interest in public order and safety."

The September 15 filing said that a key matter was a planned trip to Washington, D.C. by Monegan to seek funding for an initiative against sexual assault. The filing said that "the proposed Washington trip proved to be the last straw", and that she had not authorized the trip. On April 28, 2008, Palin had praised Monegan for his work in this area (sexual assault and domestic violence).

On September 19, ABC News reported that the governor's staff had authorized Monegan's trip, scheduled for July 22, 2008. ABC posted a travel authorization, signed by Nizich, Palin's Chief of Staff, on June 19, 2008, for the trip.

In response to inquiries about the travel authorization, the McCain-Palin campaign provided a statement on September 19 from Ruaro, the governor's deputy chief of staff as of September 1, 2008. Ruaro wrote that Monegan asked for—and received—approval for the travel without telling Palin's staff his reason for going. '"As a matter of routine, the travel was approved by Mike Nizich ... weeks before the actual purpose was made clear by former Commissioner Monegan,'" Ruaro wrote. On September 20, the McCain campaign said "Gov. Palin's chief of staff authorized Monegan to travel to Washington ... weeks before Monegan revealed the true purpose of his trip."

However, the September 15 legal filing contained a related e-mail: on June 26, 2008, Randy Ruaro, at that time a special assistant to the governor, emailed Karen Rehfeld, the director of the Office of Management and Budget, with a copy to Nizich. The email began "Walt and DPS want to make a trip back to DC in the end of July ... to get funding ... for work on sexual assault cases."

On October 13, 2008, Monegan asked the State Personnel Board for a hearing at which he could defend himself against Palin's accusations. Monegan's "Request for Due Process Hearing To Address Reputational Harm" set forth Palin's explanations for having dismissed him. It also stated:

Like all cabinet officers, Mr. Monegan served at the pleasure of the Governor and she could terminate him for any just reason or for no reason at all. But the Governor is not entitled to make untrue and defamatory statements about her reasons for discharging a cabinet officer. Governor Palin's public statements accusing Mr. Monegan of serious misconduct were untrue and they have stigmatized his good name, severely damaged – and continue to damage – his reputation, and impaired his ability to pursue future professional employment in law enforcement and related fields.

The Palins' attorney, Thomas Van Flein, stated that Palin and her husband would both give depositions on October 24 afternoon outside the state. As part of the Alaska Personnel Board investigation, with hired independent counsel Timothy Petumenos, each interview was expected to take up to 3 hours.

=== Police union ethics complaint ===
On September 3, the police union filed an ethics complaint with the Alaska Attorney General's office. The complaint alleged that Palin and her officials had illegally accessed and disclosed information from Wooten's confidential personnel records. It said that the call by Frank Bailey, particularly the allegation that Wooten had lied on his job application, demonstrated knowledge that could only have come from Wooten's private file. During the February 29, 2008, call, which was recorded, Lt. Dial asked Bailey how he had come across this "extremely confidential" information, and Bailey replied "I'm a little bit reluctant to say. Over in admin is where, you know, we hold workers' comp right in there."

The McCain-Palin campaign responded to the September 3 ethics complaint by saying that the privacy had been waived as part of the Wooten divorce proceedings, putting the information in the public domain, and that Bailey had received the information from Todd Palin, not from Wooten's personnel records, following Wooten's release on February 7, 2008 of his entire personnel file ("including all disciplinary action(s)") to his ex-wife's attorneys.

=== Final report of Alaska Personnel Board ===
On November 3, 2008, the Alaska Personnel Board concluded its probe and determined that Palin had not violated ethics laws, contradicting the earlier investigations. Tim Petumenos, the lawyer hired by the board to conduct the probe, was quoted as stating in his final report, "There is no probable cause to believe that the governor, or any other state official, violated the Alaska Executive Ethics Act in connection with these matters." The Personnel Board report also dismissed Monegan's request for a hearing and recommended that the police union's (PSEA) amended complaint be dismissed. The summary and recommendations of the Petumenos report are as follows:

SUMMARY OF PUBLIC FINDINGS AND RECOMMENDATIONS AND EXECUTIVE SUMMARY

1. There is no probable cause to believe that Governor Palin violated the Alaska Executive Ethics Act by making the decision to dismiss Department of Public Safety Commissioner Monegan and offering him instead the position of Director of the Alcohol Beverage Control Board.

2. There is no probable cause to believe that Governor Palin violated the Alaska Executive Ethics Act in any other respect in connection with the employment of Alaska State Trooper Michael Wooten.

3. There is no basis upon which to refer the conduct of Governor Palin to any law enforcement agency in connection with this matter because Governor Palin did not commit the offenses of Interference with Official Proceedings or Official Misconduct.

4. There is no probable cause to believe that any other official of state government violated any substantive provision of the Ethics Act.

5. There is no legal basis or jurisdiction for conducting a "Due Process Hearing to Address Reputational Harm" as requested by former Commissioner Walter Monegan.

6. The Amended Complaint by the PSEA should be dismissed.

7. Independent Counsel recommends that the appropriate agency of State government address the issue of the private use of e-mails for government work and revisit the record retention policies of the Governor's Office.

These findings differ from those of the Branchflower Report because Independent Counsel has concluded the wrong statute was used as a basis for the conclusions contained in the Branchflower Report. The Branchflower Report misconstrued the available evidence and did not consider or obtain all of the material evidence that is required to properly reach findings in this matter.

In early December, Palin's deputy press secretary said that the board's report had been released because Palin had waived her confidentiality to release it, but that Palin would not release a transcript of her testimony on October 24. The governor's office also refused to release a transcript of Todd Palin's deposition and other key documents that were part of the Personnel Board investigation but not included as attachments to the official report.

=== Palin's views regarding the proper venue for the investigation ===
Palin has made a number of statements expressing her views on the proper venue for the investigation.

==== Intent to cooperate ====
- On July 18, 2008, Palin said "we would never prohibit, or be less than enthusiastic about any kind of investigation."
- On July 21, Palin said that said she welcomed an investigation. "I've said all along, hold me accountable," Palin told reporters.
- On July 24, Palin said "I have absolutely nothing to hide ... I'm happy to answer any questions between now and when they [the legislature] do conduct an investigation also. ... I'm happy to comply, to cooperate. ... No problem with an independent investigation."
- On July 29, Palin's spokesperson said "the governor has said all along that she will fully cooperate with an investigation and her staff will cooperate as well."
- On August 13, an official press release stated "Governor Palin has directed all of her staff to cooperate fully with Branchflower."
- On August 29, Palin's attorney wrote to Branchflower: "Please know that we intend to cooperate with this investigation ... I would like to review our calendars to schedule depositions of witnesses."
- On August 30, the McCain campaign said "Governor Palin is an open book on this -- she did nothing wrong and has nothing to hide. ... she has been happy to cooperate fully in the inquiry of this matter. ... The legislature and Attorney General are both currently reviewing the circumstances of Walt Monegan's departure ... and the Governor is fully cooperating with those inquiries."
- On August 30, The Washington Times reported that Palin knew Branchflower by reputation, and welcomed the investigation: "I know he's a prosecutor, probably a heavy duty prosecutor, and so that kind of puzzles us why we are going down that road when we are very, very open to answering any questions anybody has of me or administrators ... But I think this process will bode well for the state of Alaska and our administration, having a review committee of those experts in public safety, in the trooper organization."
- On September 4, the Anchorage Daily News noted that Palin had made repeated public statements that she would cooperate, and reported that Palin's attorney had said that hadn't changed.

==== Intent not to cooperate ====
- On September 1, Palin requested that the Personnel Board review the matter. That same date, her lawyer, hired in late August, asked the legislature to drop its investigation, saying that by state law, the Personnel Board had jurisdiction over ethics issues.
- On September 2, Palin's attorney wrote to Branchflower: "It appears that the [Personnel] Board has jurisdiction over this matter ... [therefore you should] suspend your investigation pending the outcome of the Personnel Board investigation."
- On September 5, French and Ramras made this joint statement: "This week, seven key witnesses informed Mr. Branchflower through their attorneys that they would not provide depositions. Their depositions, which had been agreed to and scheduled earlier with Mr. Branchflower, were cancelled within the last 72 hours."
- On September 13, Palin said "we've said all along that ... the personnel board is the appropriate agency or board to inquire."
- On September 16, a McCain spokesperson said "the governor is not going to cooperate with that [Branchflower] investigation."

== Successors to Monegan ==
Palin replaced Monegan with Chuck Kopp, who had been the police chief and, for a time, the acting city manager, of Kenai. She had previously nominated Kopp in March 2007 to the Alaska Judicial Council, to which he was later confirmed. (He resigned on July 13, 2008.) The Alaska Judicial Council recommends judges for selection in the state. According to the Anchorage Daily News, Kopp "was a rising star in Alaska's Christian conservative movement." In Kenai, Kopp had been previously suspended and investigated for sexual harassment of an employee. Palin said she believed, when she named him on July 11, that the investigation had cleared him, and that she learned that Kopp had received a letter of reprimand only when Kopp held a press conference on July 22 to discuss that letter. Kopp resigned on July 25. He received a $10,000 severance payment. Monegan had received no severance payment.

Although certain reports indicate that Kopp was appointed on July 11, the actual announcement from Palin's office is dated July 14. The person who was sexually harassed by Kopp sent an email to Palin on July 14, 2008, very early in the morning before Palin made her announcement. The victim said "my sexual harassment complaint against Chief Kopp was acknowledged [and] validated ... by the City of Kenai." In a letter to the victim on October 10, 2005, the City of Kenai had said this: "As a result of our investigation, Chuck Kopp was removed immediately from his supervisory role relating to your position. ... The City of Kenai will not tolerate harassment of its employees from anyone, regardless of his or her position." Palin later stated that when she appointed Kopp, she was unaware that he had been reprimanded.

On September 12, 2008 Palin appointed Joseph Masters as the third Public Safety Commissioner in a two-month period. Masters, a former deputy director of the Alaska State Troopers, had been security director for petrochemical operations for a private company. He replaced John Glass, who had served as acting commissioner. The Anchorage Daily News reported: "Asked if the governor discussed her vision of the department with him, [Masters] said, 'Gov. Palin didn't give me any guidance or direction or mandates for the department.'"

As of mid-September 2008, the post of director of the Alcoholic Beverage Control Board (the alternative job which Palin had offered to Monegan) was unfilled.

== Areas of possible factual inconsistency ==
In a number of instances, certain facts appear to be described in an inconsistent manner, when comparing multiple sources:

=== Allegations that Wooten is violent and abusive ===
According to the memorandum of findings and the suspension letter, there was no finding that Wooten ever committed any act of violence against any person, other than the Taser incident. According to a police statement, McCann told police that Wooten never abused her. According to a police statement, the DVPO was dissolved because there was no evidence of violence.

According to various statements by Palin et al., Wooten is violent and abusive. Various statements reference the DVPO as proof that Wooten is violent. In a sworn statement, Todd Palin accused Wooten of "violent behavior" directed at four family members. On September 2, 2008 Palin said that Wooten was guilty of "violent behavior ... directed against ... my sister." On September 17 McCain-Palin spokesperson Meg Stapleton said Wooten "abused her [Palin's] sister." On October 9 Stapleton said "there are numerous instances of abuse." On October 10 the McCain campaign accused Wooten of "violent behavior" directed at four family members in 2005 and early 2006.

=== Threats against other family members ===
According to the Memorandum of Findings and the suspension letter, there was no finding that Wooten ever made any threat of violence against any person, other than Heath. The alleged threat against Heath was witnessed by no one outside the family. The suspension letter did not mention that threat. Another alleged threat, to "bring down" Sarah and her family, was witnessed only by McCann, and she stated that she understood it was not a threat of violence, but rather a threat "to make life difficult" for them.

According to various statements by Palin et al., Wooten has made violent threats against various other members of her family, aside from Heath. For example, on September 15, 2008, Palin said Wooten had made "threats of violence" against McCann and Palin's nephew.

=== Threats subsequent to April 2005 ===
In September 2008, Palin described Wooten as "a trooper who is making threats against the First Family." On September 18 she again mentioned "his threats against the First Family." This seems to indicate that Wooten has made threats subsequent to the time that Palin became governor. However, Palin's September 2008 legal filings do not detail any threats that took place after Palin became governor, or at any time since April 11, 2005, when the divorce was filed. Palin's filing on September 1, 2008 said "no one in the Palin family ever filed a formal complaint," subsequent to the complaints the family made in 2005.

Branchflower said "Palin has stated publicly that she and her family feared Trooper Wooten. Yet the evidence presented has been inconsistent with such claims of fear ... she ordered a substantial reduction in manpower in her personal protection detail ..., an act that is inconsistent with a desire to avoid harm from Trooper Wooten ... [Palin's] claims of fear were not bona fide and were offered to provide cover for the Palins' real motivation: to get Trooper Wooten fired for personal family related reasons."

Branchflower wrote that in their first meeting with their security detail, the Palins were specifically asked if they knew of any threats against them. "They basically said no."

=== Duration and nature of the restraining order ===
According to the DVPO document itself, the DVPO was temporary, with a nominal 20-day duration. It was issued presumptively on April 11, 2005, based on allegations made by McCann that day, in her written application. The DVPO document indicates that a hearing would be held to determine whether or not the temporary order should be extended into a long-term protective order. That hearing was originally scheduled for April 27 but actually took place on May 9. According to a police statement, the DVPO was dissolved at the May 9 hearing because McCann could not present evidence of violence.

On September 2, 2008, Palin said "the Anchorage Superior Court [had found] that [Wooten] had engaged in serious, violent misconduct." According to a sworn statement by Todd Palin, the DVPO extended into 2006. On September 16, 2008, the McCain campaign said "he [Wooten] is the subject of a Domestic Violence Protective Order", suggesting that the DVPO was still in effect. On October 10, 2008, the McCain campaign said Wooten was the subject of a DVPO "in 2005 and early 2006".

=== Awareness that Wooten had already been disciplined ===
According to Palin, she and her family were unaware, prior to July 2008, that Wooten had been disciplined in 2006. For example, on September 1, 2008 Palin said that "Monegan never told Governor Palin or Todd about the discipline that Wooten received ... the parties involved had no idea how the matter was resolved ... As far as the Palin family knew [as of July 2008], Wooten ... had escaped discipline." In a sworn statement on October 8, 2008, Todd Palin said "the DPS never informed me or my wife that Wooten had been disciplined."

According to the Branchflower Report, Sarah Palin was aware that Wooten had been disciplined. Branchflower said Palin was "apparently intent upon getting Trooper Wooten fired in spite of the fact she knew he had been disciplined following the Administrative Investigation." In a sworn deposition, Monegan said that he did "mention [to Sarah Palin] that the discipline had already been imposed on Mr. Wooten during the previous administration following an administrative investigation and that the matter was closed." Branchflower reports that Monegan "told Mr. Palin that the matter had been investigated, that discipline had been imposed."

The Branchflower Report includes testimony by John Glass, Deputy Commissioner of Public Safety, who testified that he told Todd Palin "that Wooten had already been penalized for his actions that he had taken." Glass testified that he gave the same information to Frank Bailey, Palin's director of boards and commissions. Glass told Bailey that "he should just leave the matter alone since Wooten disciplinary proceeding had already taken and that discipline had already been imposed and the matter was closed."

=== Allegations of misconduct against parties other than Wooten ===
According to a statement by police, the DVPO was dissolved because McCann showed no evidence that Wooten was violent.

According to Palin, the DVPO was dissolved because Wooten's superiors intervened. According to Palin, the police investigation was "negligently or deliberately slipshod ... investigators seemed more concerned about exonerating Wooten than protecting public safety or the Palin family."

=== Confidential status of Wooten's personnel file ===
According to the police union ethics complaint, Bailey had improper access to confidential information from Wooten's personnel file. Palin responded by stating that Todd Palin had this information because Wooten had signed a release placing his entire personnel file in the public domain. However, Palin has also claimed that her family was not aware of Wooten's suspension until July 2008. Also, Wooten's release of February 7, 2008, did not place his file in the public domain, it only released his file to McCann's attorneys in connection with the divorce proceedings.

=== Claims about prior discipline ===
According to the suspension letter issued by Col. Grimes, there had been three disciplinary actions against Wooten: a warning, a reprimand, and an Instruction, for such things as "not using turn signals", in the period prior to April 11, 2005, the date when the divorce was filed and a Domestic Violence Protective Order was issued.

According to Palin, "Wooten had been disciplined a dozen times before he was the subject of a Domestic Violence Protective Order from Molly McCann."

== See also ==
- Governorship of Sarah Palin
