= Vice presidential candidacy of Sarah Palin =

2008 United States candidacy

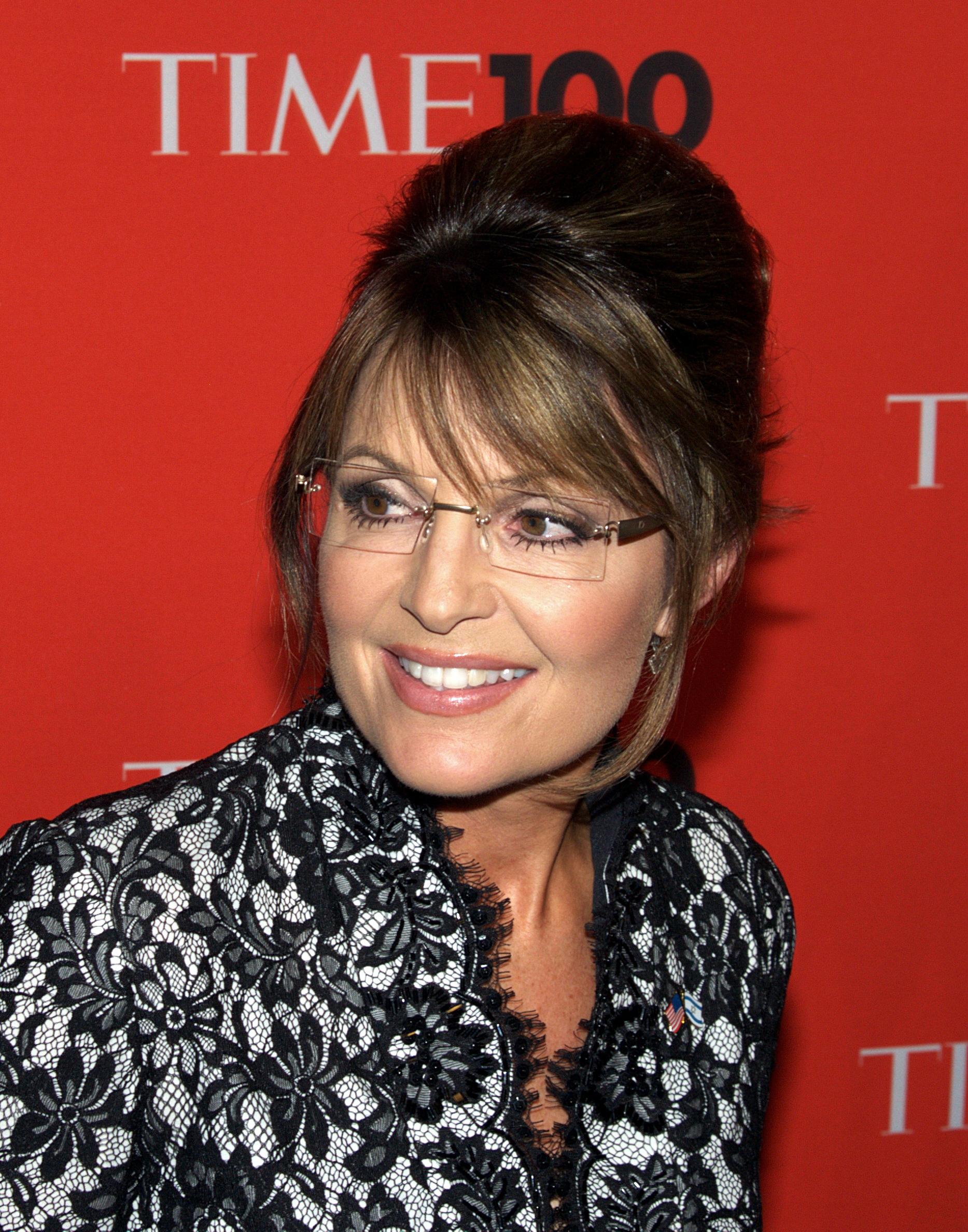
Vice presidential nominee
Sarah Palin
Alaska

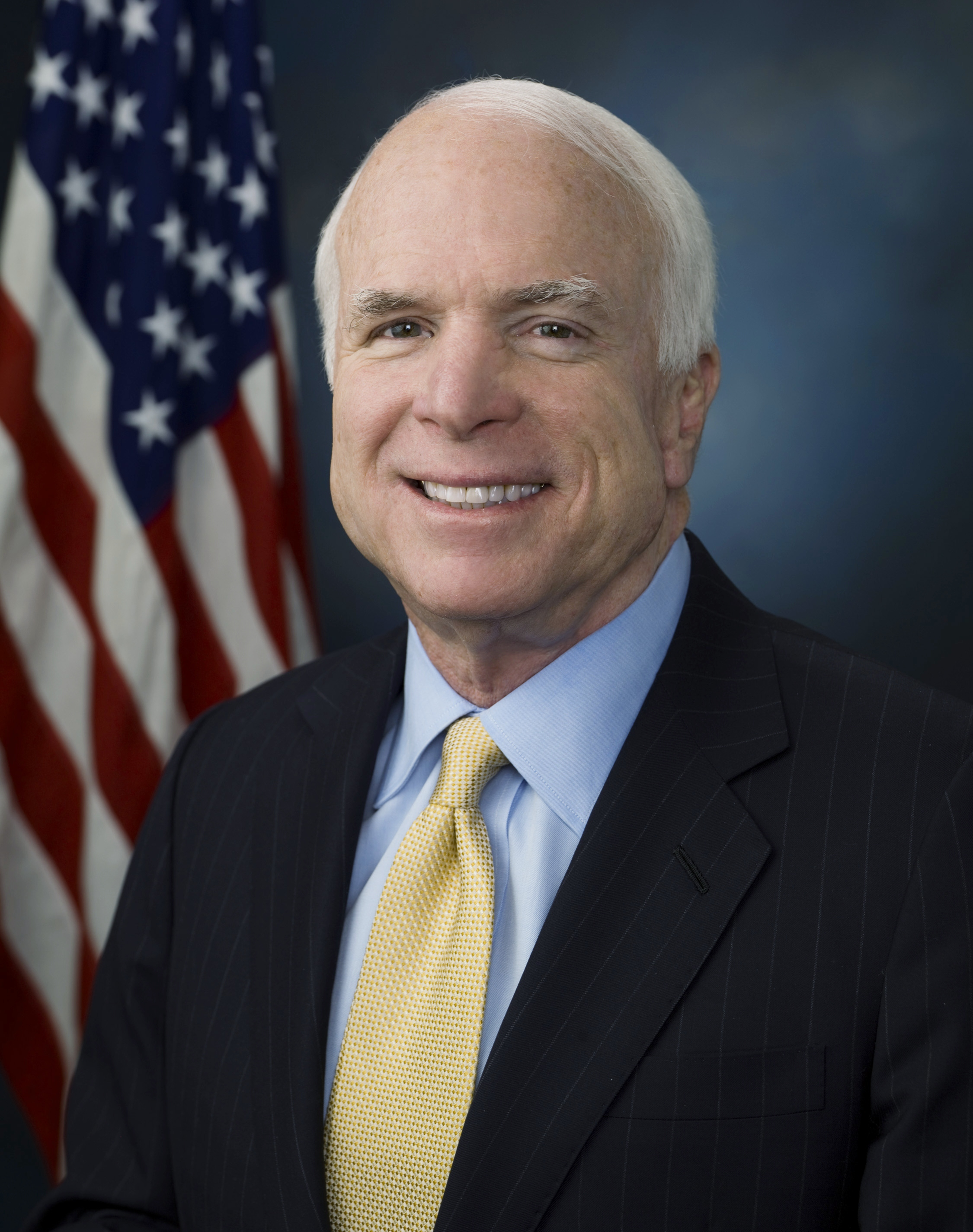
Presidential nominee
John McCain
Arizona

Sarah Palin's candidacy for Vice President of the United States was publicly announced by then-presumptive Republican Party presidential candidate John McCain on August 29, 2008. As part of the McCain presidential campaign, Palin, then the incumbent Governor of Alaska, was officially nominated by acclamation at the 2008 Republican National Convention on September 3. The McCain–Palin ticket lost the 2008 presidential election on November 4 to the Barack Obama–Joe Biden ticket.

== Selection ==
Senator John McCain began a search for a running mate to join the Republican ticket after clinching the Republican nomination. Former candidates Mitt Romney and Mike Huckabee were mentioned as possibilities, as were many other leaders in the Republican Party and the business world. Over Memorial Day weekend, McCain invited Romney, Florida Governor Charlie Crist, and Louisiana Governor Bobby Jindal to his Sedona, Arizona ranch for informal get-togethers intended to assess personal chemistry for possible running mate selection.

McCain then announced plans to reveal his running mate the day following the conclusion of the Democratic National Convention, and just a few days before the start of the Republican National Convention. During the running mate deliberations, McCain had favored Joe Lieberman, who shared his romantic sense of righteousness and honor. But the opposition from social conservatives, who objected to Lieberman's pro-choice views, was too strong, and a Lieberman pick might have caused a floor fight at the upcoming convention. McCain wanted someone who would shake up the race and reinforce his image as a maverick, so he decided against more conventional choices on his short list including Romney and Governor Tim Pawlenty.

McCain had only talked to Palin a few times, and the campaign's vetting operation had mostly relied on Internet searches to check her background. Steve Schmidt and Nicolle Wallace assumed, incorrectly, that Palin would have a basic working knowledge about the public policy debates of the previous five to ten years. Palin's career in Alaska had shown maverick tendencies similar to McCain's, and McCain hoped that Palin's youth, reformist record, appeal to social conservatives, and appeal to disaffected female Hillary Clinton voters would outweigh her lack of national and international visibility and experience.

According to the book Game Change, on the weekend before John McCain made his vice-presidential pick, McCain's advisor Arthur Culvahouse asked attorney Ted Frank to prepare a written vetting report on Sarah Palin:

Thrown together from scratch in less than forty hours, the document highlighted her vulnerabilities: "Democrats upset at McCain's anti-Obama 'celebrity' advertisements will mock Palin as an inexperienced beauty queen whose main national exposure was a photo-spread in Vogue in February 2008. Even in campaigning for governor, she made a number of gaffes, and the Anchorage Daily News expressed concern that she often seemed 'unprepared or over her head' in a campaign run by a friend.

== Announcement ==
On August 29, the day after the Democratic Convention, John McCain introduced Sarah Palin in a speech at Wright State University in Fairborn, Ohio, a suburb of Dayton. Palin announced, "Hillary left 18 million cracks in the highest, hardest glass ceiling in America. But it turns out the women of America aren't finished yet, and we can shatter that glass ceiling once and for all". One of McCain's aides privately remarked via an American football metaphor during the announcement: "We just threw long."

== Initial reaction ==
After announcing Palin as the presumptive vice-presidential nominee, the McCain campaign received US$7 million in contributions in a single day. According to a survey by The Washington Post/ABC News published on September 9, 2008, John McCain had gained huge support among white women voters since the announcement; he had not only surpassed the Democratic Party candidate Senator Barack Obama in white women voters, but also amassed a lead of five percentage points in the Gallup polls. John Zogby found that the effects of Palin's selection were helping the McCain ticket since "She has high favorability numbers, and has unified the Republican Party."

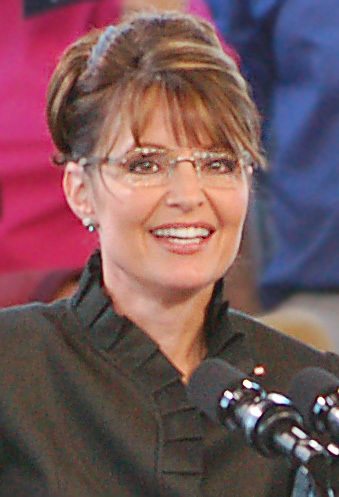
Sarah Palin at campaign rally in Carson City, Nevada, September 13, 2008

The choice received generally positive reactions from Republicans and conservatives. Victor Davis Hanson stated "the timing and choice were inspired", and Mark Steyn stated he was "happy" over the choice. Connecticut Governor M. Jodi Rell said of Palin, "She is strong. She is capable. She is articulate," and suggested opponents should not underestimate her. Independent-Democratic Senator Joe Lieberman stated that McCain made a "bold choice" in picking a "maverick who has done exactly the same thing at the state level that he's done at the federal level". However, some Republicans did not receive the choice favorably. Charles Krauthammer of The Washington Post wrote, "The Palin selection completely undercuts the argument about Obama's inexperience and readiness to lead. ... To gratuitously undercut the remarkably successful 'Is he ready to lead' line of attack seems near suicidal." David Frum of National Review wrote: "The longer I think about it, the less well this selection sits with me. ... If it were your decision, and you were putting your country first, would you put an untested small-town mayor a heartbeat away from the presidency?". Following an NBC interview, Peggy Noonan commented, "It's over ... the most qualified? No."

Republicans in Palin's home state, Alaska, had mixed reactions to the news. Alaskan Attorney General Talis Colberg, a Palin appointee, remarked that, "It's wonderful. It was an emotional thing to see the governor walk out with her family and I say, wow, I work for her." Alaskan State Senate President Lyda Green, a Republican who had repeatedly sparred with Palin after she became governor, remarked, "She's not prepared to be governor. How can she be prepared to be vice president or president?" Larry Persily, a Palin staffer, and Jim Whitaker, the Republican mayor of Fairbanks, indicated their support of Palin as governor, but questioned whether she was ready to serve as vice president. Other Alaskan politicians, such as Republican Gail Phillips, expressed surprise.

Kari Sleight, publisher of the Mat-Su Valley Frontiersman, which covered much of Palin's life in Wasilla, endorsed Palin for vice-president. "While some question Palin's experience, they cannot question her leadership. A person is either a good leader or not, and Palin has exhibited great leadership skills in all positions she's held. There is an argument to be made that leadership, and the qualities that define a good leader, are inherently more important than experience."

Palin's positions and policies became the focus of "intense media attention" and "scrutiny" following her selection. Expectations from her speech at the Republican National Convention was heavily covered by the media. Some Republicans argued that Palin was subjected to unreasonable media coverage, and a Rasmussen survey showed that slightly more than half of Americans believed that the press was "trying to hurt" Palin with negative coverage, a sentiment referenced by Palin in her acceptance speech. A poll taken just after the speech found that Palin was then slightly more popular than either Obama or McCain with a 58% favorability rating. Palin was also a draw with Catholic voters; the poll found that 54% favor Palin and 42% find her unfavorable, a 12% difference, while Joe Biden was viewed favorable by 49% to 47% unfavorable.

Palin also became a "ubiquitous presence on newsstands," appearing on the cover of both Newsweek and Time, among others. The appearance on the cover of Time was particularly notable as Jay Carney, the newsmagazine's Washington bureau chief, has been vocally critical on what he has said is a lack of media access to Palin, concerns which were dismissed by the McCain campaign.

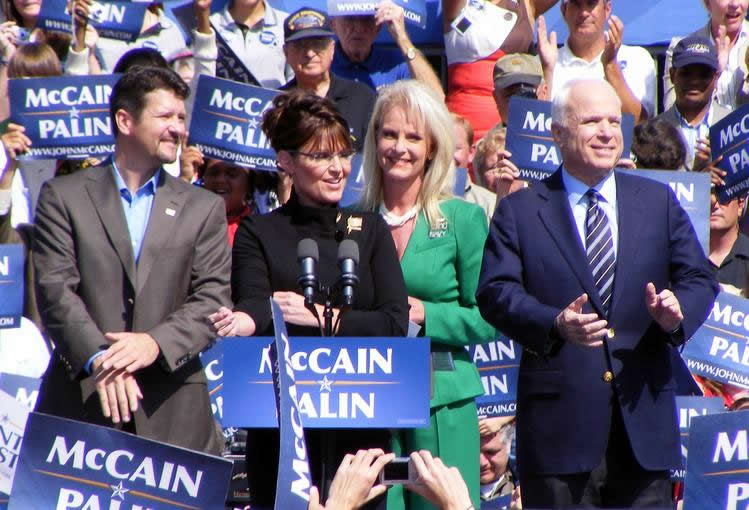
The Palins and McCains campaigning in Fairfax, Virginia, September 10, 2008, following the Republican National Convention

Former New York City mayor Rudy Giuliani said that Palin was more qualified to be president than Democratic presidential nominee Obama, citing Palin's executive experience, saying of her, "She's vetoed legislation, she's taken on corruption, and in her party, and won. She took on the oil companies and won. She administered a budget successfully," and of Obama, "He's never run a city, he's never run a state, he's never run a business, he's never administered a payroll, he's never led people in crisis". He also stated, if Sarah Palin had been president when the U.S. came under attack on September 11, 2001, he's confident she would have been able to handle the crisis.

According to The Washington Times, Palin's faith has made her a "favorite with the staunchly pro-Israel neoconservative elements in the Republican Party". Palin displays an Israeli flag in her governor's office in Juneau. Palin has received a strong endorsement from the Republican Jewish Coalition, and has been described as a "direct affront to all Jewish Americans" by Democratic Congressman Robert Wexler of Florida, and as being "totally out of step with Jewish public opinion" by the National Jewish Democratic Council.

Senator Obama commented on Palin in an interview with 60 Minutes:

Well, I don't know Governor Palin, I have not met her before. I had a brief conversation with her after she was selected to congratulate her and wish her luck - but, not too much luck! - on the campaign trail. And she seems to have a compelling life story. Obviously, she's a fine mother and a up-and-coming public servant. So, it's too early for me to gauge what kind of running mate she'll be. My sense is that she subscribes to John McCain's agenda. And ultimately, this [election] is going to be about where I want to take the country and where Joe Biden wants to take the country, and where John McCain and his running mate want to take the country.

== Convention ==
Palin accepted the vice presidential nomination of the Republican party at the convention on September 3.

Senator John McCain had asked Bush speechwriter Matthew Scully to write the acceptance speech for his vice presidential nominee, whom McCain had not yet chosen. Scully wrote the speech two weeks before the convention. He wrote the speech for a man to deliver, not a woman. Four days before the convention, Scully was surprised when he was informed that Alaska Governor Sarah Palin was to be McCain's running mate. Scully then worked all night to tailor the speech to Palin and also to incorporate new campaign strategy shifts that were being rapidly formed in intensive discussions by McCain campaign staff.

Palin delivered the 40-minute speech at the convention on September 3, 2008.

== Election issues ==
=== "Bridge to Nowhere" ===
On August 29, when first introduced as McCain's running mate, Governor Palin told the crowd: "I told Congress, thanks but no thanks on that bridge to nowhere" – a line that garnered big applause. Early McCain–Palin television advertisements claimed that Palin "stopped the Bridge to Nowhere".

These claims have been widely questioned or described as misleading in several newspapers across the political spectrum. Howard Kurtz called this a "whopper", writing: "She endorsed the remote project while running for governor in 2006, claimed to be an opponent only after Congress killed its funding the next year and has used the $223 million provided for it for other state ventures." Newsweek, commenting on Palin's "astonishing pivot", remarked: "Now she talks as if she always opposed the funding."

McCain also weighed in on the Gravina Island Bridge. In advertisements, McCain labeled the bridge as wasteful spending, and in an August 2007 town hall speech recorded on video and quoted again on April 30, 2008, he blamed the Minneapolis I-35 bridge collapse on the Gravina Island Bridge. His advertising and comments that (before September 21, 2006) contradicted Governor Sarah Palin's support of the bridge drew the attention of the media when he chose Palin as his running mate, opening the ticket to charges of hypocrisy.

=== Interviews with Charlie Gibson ===
External videos
- "Interview with Gov. Sarah Palin"

On September 11 and 12, Palin submitted to her first national interview, with ABC's Charles Gibson Gibson asked Palin, "Do you agree with the Bush doctrine?," to which Palin responded, "In what respect, Charlie?" After asking Palin for her definition, Gibson defined the concept to be for the United States to "have the right of anticipatory self-defense". Gibson also asked Palin about a prayer she had offered with regard to soldiers in Iraq. Commentators' reactions varied. Those generally critical of Palin's candidacy applauded Gibson's penetrating questions and thought aspects of Palin's responses showed that she was not ready to serve as vice president, whereas those generally supportive of her candidacy took a more positive view of her performance.

Palin's second media interview was with Fox News's Sean Hannity.

=== Saturday Night Live parody ===
September 13 saw the first of many performances by Tina Fey in the role of Palin. The first sketch, "A Nonpartisan Message from Governor Sarah Palin & Senator Hillary Clinton," featured Tina Fey and Amy Poehler as Palin and Clinton, respectively.

The sketch mocked Palin's performance during the Gibson interviews. Palin's comments on Alaska's proximity to Russia gave rise to the satirical line "And I can see Russia from my house."

It also drew attention to Palin's apparent lack of knowledge about foreign policy:

Amy Poehler as Hillary Clinton: I disagree with the Bush doctrine. Tina Fey as Palin: And I don't know what that is.

=== Email hacked ===
On September 16, the Yahoo! personal email account of vice presidential candidate Sarah Palin was subjected to unauthorized access. The hacker had obtained access to Palin's account by looking up biographical details such as her high school and birthdate and using Yahoo!'s account recovery for forgotten passwords.

=== Interviews with Katie Couric ===
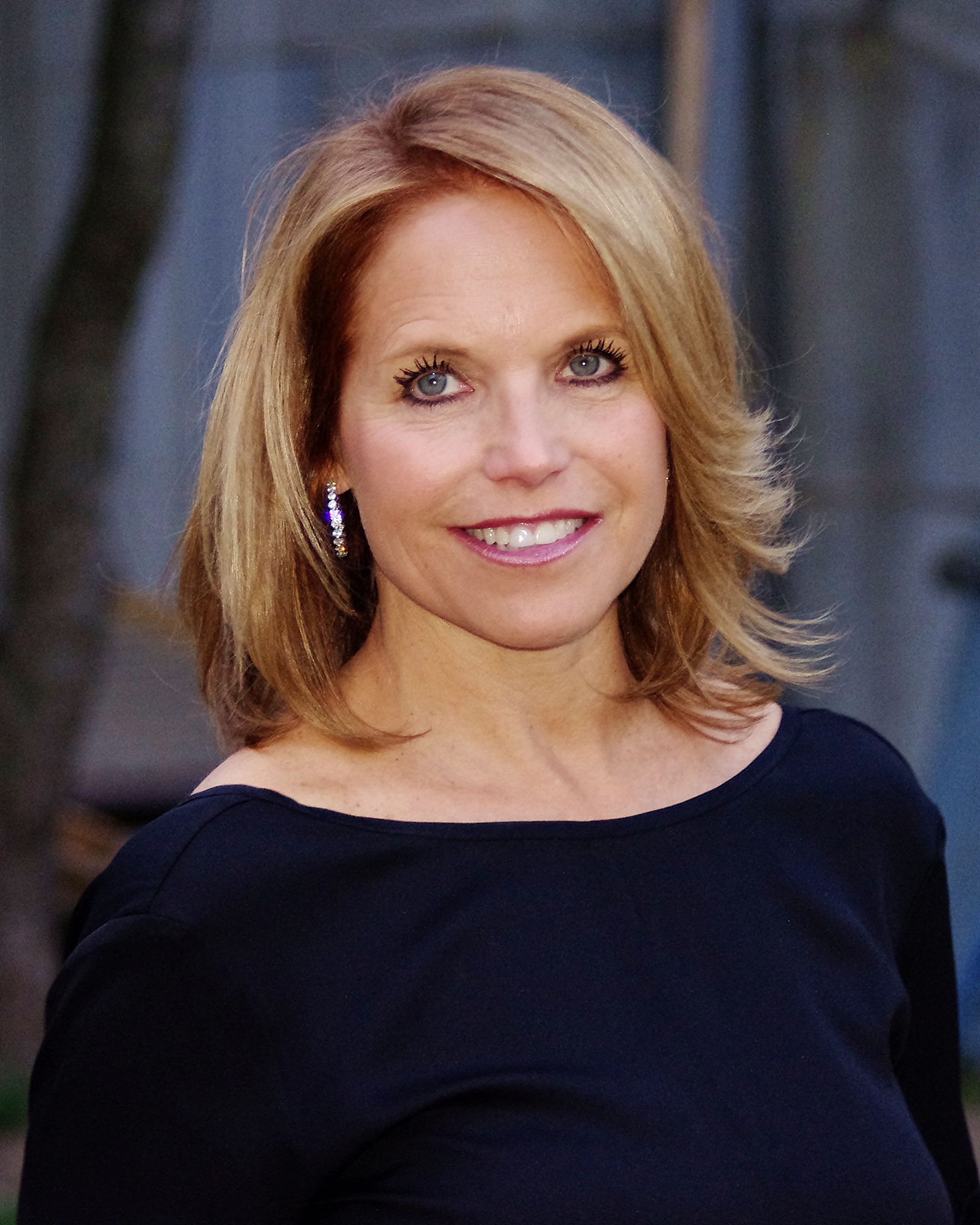
Katie Couric conducted a multiple-part interview with Sarah Palin in September 2008.

After McCain announced Palin as his running mate, Newsweek and Time put Palin on their magazine covers, as some of the media alleged that McCain's campaign was restricting press access to Palin by allowing only three one-on-one interviews and no press conferences with her. Among the reasons that the news organizations criticized the restrictions was Palin's first major interview, with Charles Gibson of ABC News, met with mixed reviews. Her interview five days later with Fox News's Sean Hannity focuses on many of the same questions from Gibson's interview. However, Palin's performance in her third interview, with Katie Couric of CBS News, was widely criticized, prompting a decline in her poll numbers, concern among Republicans that she was becoming a political liability, and calls from some conservative commentators for Palin to resign from the presidential ticket. Other conservatives remain ardent in their support for Palin, accusing the columnists of elitism. Following this interview, some Republicans, including Mitt Romney and Bill Kristol, questioned the McCain campaign's strategy of sheltering Palin from unscripted encounters with the press.

Palin's performance in the Couric interview was lampooned several days later on the September 27 of Saturday Night Live. That sketch featured Palin being interviewed by Katie Couric who was played by Amy Poehler; In the sketch, Fey quoted verbatim some of Palin's actual statements:

SARAH PALIN with Couric: That's why I say, I, like every American I'm speaking with, we're ill about this position that we have been put in where it is the tax payers looking to bail out, but ultimately, what the bailout does is help those who are concerned about the healthcare reform that is needed to help shore up our economy, helping tho— it's got to be all about job creation too, shoring up our economy, and putting it back on the right track, so healthcare reform and reducing taxes and reining in spending has got to accompany tax reductions and tax relief for Americans. And trade, we've got to see trade as opportunity, not as— competitive— scary thing, but one in five jobs being created in the trade sector today, we've got to look at that as more opportunity. All those things under the umbrella of job creation. This bailout is a part of that.

TINA FEY AS PALIN: "Like every American I'm speaking with, we're ill about this. We're saying, 'Hey, why bail out Fanny and Freddie and not me?' But ultimately what the bailout does is, help those that are concerned about the healthcare reform that is needed to help shore up our economy to help ... uh ... it's gotta be all about job creation, too. Also, too, shoring up our economy and putting Fannie and Freddy back on the right track and so healthcare reform and reducing taxes and reining in spending ... 'cause Barack Obama, y'know ... we've got to accompany tax reductions and tax relief for Americans, also, having a dollar value meal at restaurants. That's going to help, but one in five jobs being created today under the umbrella of job creation. That, you know, also."

=== Vice-presidential debate ===
Palin was reported to have prepared intensively for the October 2 vice-presidential debate with Democratic vice-presidential nominee Joe Biden at Washington University in St. Louis. Some Republicans suggested that Palin's performance in the interviews would improve public perceptions of her debate performance by lowering expectations. Polling from CNN, Fox and CBS found that while Palin exceeded most voters' expectations, they felt that Biden had won the debate.

=== Anti-Obama rhetoric ===
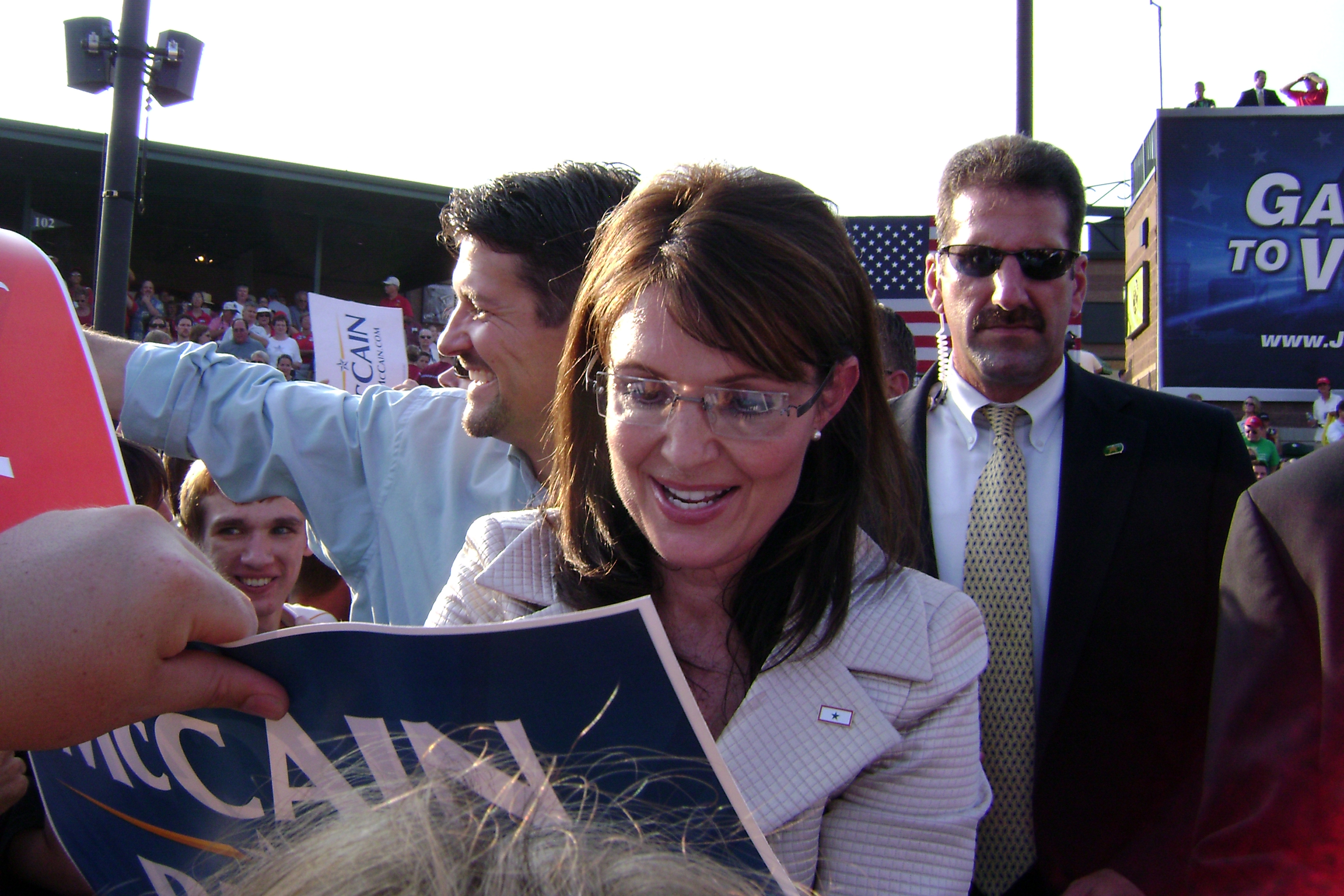
Palin signing an autograph at a campaign rally in O'Fallon, Missouri

Upon returning to the campaign trail after her debate preparation, Palin stepped up her attacks on the Democratic candidate for president, Senator Barack Obama.

In a campaign appearance on October 4, Palin accused Obama of regarding America as "so imperfect that he's palling around with terrorists who would target their own country". The accusation referred to Obama's contacts with Bill Ayers, a founder of the 1960s radical group called the Weathermen, and a New York Times article describing such contacts. The Obama campaign called the allegation a "smear", citing newspaper commentaries critical of Palin's attack. Obama has condemned the Weathermen's violent actions. The criticism of Obama based on his purported relationship with Ayers was subsequently carried on by McCain himself.

At a fundraising event, Palin explained her new aggressiveness, saying, "There does come a time when you have to take the gloves off and that time is right now."

By late October, voter reactions to Palin had grown increasingly negative, especially among independents and other voters concerned about her qualifications. Republican and former US Secretary of State Gen. Colin Powell endorsed Obama on October 19 and said of Palin "Now that we have had a chance to watch her for some seven weeks, I don't believe she's ready to be president of the United States, which is the job of the vice president."

=== "Troopergate" ===
On October 10, 2008, the twelve-member Alaska Legislative Council voted unanimously to release, without endorsing, an investigative report, which found Palin had violated the ethics law covering state executive employees.

=== RNC campaign expenditures ===
On October 22, it was reported that the Republican National Committee's monthly financial disclosure report for September showed that US$150,000 had been spent on Palin's wardrobe, hair and makeup as well as clothing and accessories for her family. Campaign finance experts expressed concern about the legality of the spending and the tax implications to Palin. A campaign spokesperson responded saying that the clothing will be donated to charity following the election. By January 2009, it was reported that the clothing was stored in garbage bags at the Republican National Convention headquarters. In March 2009, a spokesperson for Palin stated that the clothes had been donated to charities The spending was later reviewed and approved by the U.S. Federal Elections Commission by a 5–0 vote.

Another controversy erupted when it was revealed that her campaign paid makeup artist, Amy Strozzi, a sum of $22,800, making her the highest paid staffer on the McCain campaign. This prompted calls from Republican donors to "return the money".

=== "Going Rogue" ===
Palin gave an impromptu news conference on a Colorado tarmac, reportedly against the wishes of the campaign. She publicly contradicted the campaign's decision to pull out of Michigan.

On October 25, news stories by Politico and CNN reported dissension within the campaign. A McCain aide said Palin had "gone rogue", placing her own future political interests ahead of the McCain/Palin ticket, directly contradicting her running mate's positions and disobeying directions from campaign managers. (A year after the election, Palin would title her memoir after this accusation.)

An unnamed Palin ally "outside the campaign" said that Palin felt "completely mismanaged and mishandled and ill advised ... Recently, she's gone from relying on McCain advisers who were assigned to her to relying on her own instincts." An unnamed McCain source reported: "She is a diva. She takes no advice from anyone.; She does not have any relationships of trust with any of us, her family or anyone else.; Also, she is playing for her own future and sees herself as the next leader of the party. Remember: Divas trust only unto themselves, as they see themselves as the beginning and end of all wisdom."

On November 1, Saturday Night Live featured Tina Fey as Palin, this time in a sketch featuring the real John McCain. Echoing the earlier reports, Fey (as Palin) turned to the camera, away from McCain, and says "Okay, listen up, everybody, I'm going rogue right now, so keep your voices down! Available now, we've got a bunch of these Palin 2012 t-shirts."

== Election ==
The election took place on November 4, and Obama was projected as the winner at 11:00 PM EST. In his concession speech McCain thanked Palin, calling her "one of the best campaigners I've ever seen, and an impressive new voice in our party for reform and the principles that have always been our greatest strength". While aides were preparing the teleprompter for McCain's speech, they found a concession speech written for Palin by George W. Bush speechwriter Matthew Scully. Two members of McCain's staff, Steve Schmidt and Mark Salter, told Palin that there was no tradition of Election Night speeches by running mates, and that she would not be speaking. Palin appealed to McCain, who agreed with his staff.
