= Monegan =

Surname list

Monegan is a surname. Notable people with the surname include:

- Walt Monegan (born 1951), American politician and police chief
- Walter C. Monegan Jr. (1930–1950), United States Marine and Korean War casualty
