= Gregg Renkes =

American politician, attorney, and lobbyist

Senior Counselor to the Secretary of the Interior
- In office September 2018 – January 2021
- President: Donald Trump

Attorney General of Alaska
- In office 2002–2005
- Governor: Frank Murkowski
- Preceded by: Bruce Botelho
- Succeeded by: David W. Márquez

Personal details
- Party: Republican
- Education: Vassar College (BS); Yale University (MS); University of Colorado (JD)

Gregg Renkes is an American politician, attorney, and lobbyist who served as the Alaska Attorney General from 2002 to 2005.

== Education ==
Renkes earned a Bachelor of Science degree in environmental science from Vassar College, Master of Science from the Yale School of the Environment, and Juris Doctor from the University of Colorado Law School.

== Career ==
After graduating from law school in 1986, Renkes worked as a law clerk and state magistrate under Alaska Superior Court Judge Beverly Cutler. He went on to serve for twelve years as staffer for U.S. Senator Frank Murkowski and head of a public policy firm in Washington D.C. He was campaign coordinator for Murkowski's Senate reelection campaigns in 1992 and 1998 and manager for Murkowski's 2002 gubernatorial campaign.

Following his election as governor in 2002, Murkowski appointed Renkes as Alaska Attorney General. In 2004, Renkes became involved in negotiating a trade deal between Alaska and Taiwan. At the time, he had a financial interest in and personal connections to KFx, a coal-processing company that stood to benefit from the deal. In January 2005, Robert Bundy, a former United States Attorney appointed by Murkowski to investigate the affair, determined that Renkes's stake in KFx was too small to constitute an ethics violation but that Renkes had violated Alaska law by not seeking an outside opinion on his involvement. Renkes was censured by Murkowski and subsequently resigned. He maintained that the episode was politically motivated and he never intended to profit personally.

Renkes relocated to Jackson, Wyoming, where he worked as a corporate attorney and real estate investor. In 2018, Renkes was selected to serve in the United States Department of the Interior as the Director of the Office of Policy Analysis. During his tenure in the Interior Department, Renkes has specialized on issues related to Arctic policy.
