= David W. Márquez =

American lawyer and politician

David Márquez

Attorney General of Alaska
- In office 2005–2006
- Governor: Frank Murkowski
- Preceded by: Gregg Renkes
- Succeeded by: Talis J. Colberg

Personal details
- Born: 1946 (age 79–80) Janesville, Wisconsin, U.S.
- Education: Northwestern University (BA); University of Wisconsin (JD)

David W. Márquez (born 1946) is an American lawyer and politician, and the former attorney general of the state of Alaska. He is the Senior VP and COO of NANA Development Corporation, an Alaska native corporation, owned by the Iñupiaq people of northwest Alaska.

== Early life and education ==
Márquez was born in Janesville, Wisconsin. He graduated from Northwestern University and the University of Wisconsin Law School, and was admitted to the Alaska Bar Association in 1973.

== Career ==
After a career working in the oil industry, including jobs doing land title work for the Trans-Alaska Pipeline, as general counsel for the pipeline operator Alyeska Pipeline Service Company, and later ARCO. Márquez then moved into politics, serving as Chief Assistant Attorney General, Legislative and Regulations Section in the Alaska Department of Law, and the Acting Deputy Attorney General for the Civil Division.

On March 31, 2005, Governor Frank Murkowski appointed Márquez as Alaska Attorney General. He served as Attorney General until Sarah Palin took office as the new governor of Alaska on December 4, 2006.

Political offices
Preceded by Gregg Renkes	Attorney General of Alaska; 2005–2006	Succeeded by Talis J. Colberg
