= Frank Bailey (author) =

American political writer

- Born: 1970 (age 55–56)
- Known for: Blind Allegiance to Sarah Pailin (Book)
- Spouse: Janeen
- Children: 2

Frank Bailey (born 1970) is a former aide to then Alaska governor Sarah Palin, and the principal author of Blind Allegiance to Sarah Palin: A Memoir of Our Tumultuous Years. Bailey grew up in Kodiak, Alaska. He attended college at Capernwray Bible School in Carnforth, England as well as Moody Bible Institute in Chicago. He is known for his involvement in what became known as the Troopergate scandal, which was said to have beset Palin during her participation, as the Republican candidate for vice president, in the 2008 presidential campaign.

== Blind Allegiance to Sarah Palin ==
The book was released in May 2011 by Howard Books, a division of Simon & Schuster (ISBN 978-1451654400). The book was co-authored by Jeanne Devon, editor of the Alaska-based liberal weblog Mudflats, and economist Ken Morris, an author, former trader, and Wall Street critic. The book was prematurely released online in February 2011. The book received coverage in national media outlets, and was described by the Christian Science Monitor as "depict(ing) Palin as ill-prepared, immature, vindictive, and unethical." Howard Books is a Christian publishing imprint of Simon and Schuster. After the books publication, Bailey appeared on TV talk show The View, discussing his observations of Palin.
