= Hollis French =

American attorney and politician from Alaska

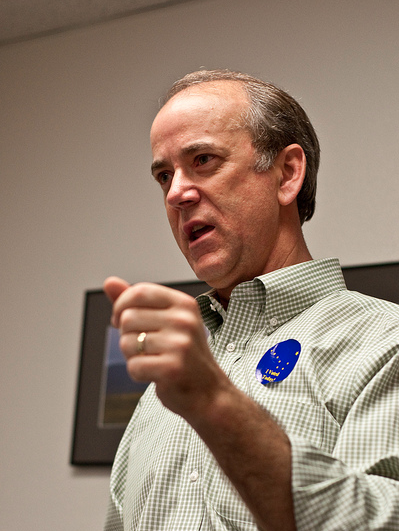
- French c. 2010

Member of the Alaska Senate from the J district
- In office January 15, 2013 – January 20, 2015
- Preceded by: Redistricted
- Succeeded by: Johnny Ellis

Member of the Alaska Senate from the M district
- In office January 20, 2003 – January 15, 2013
- Preceded by: Rick Halford
- Succeeded by: Redistricted

Personal details
- Born: October 11, 1958 (age 67) Newton, Massachusetts, U.S.
- Party: Democratic (1978–present)
- Spouse: Peggy French
- Education: University of Alaska Anchorage (BA); Cornell University (JD)

Hollis S. French II (born October 11, 1958) is an American attorney, businessman and politician. He served in the Alaska Senate from 2003 to 2015. He was minority leader from January 2014 until he left office. During this time, French authored an unsuccessful bill to strike down the state's same-sex marriage ban. He is a member of the Democratic Party.

He applied for a state judgeship position in July 2015.

French is an attorney and he and his wife own and operate an apartment rental business.

French was appointed to the Alaska Oil and Gas Conservation Commission by Governor Bill Walker in July 2016.

== Early life and education ==
French moved to Alaska in 1978. He first oil industry job began in 1979 when he was hired as a bullcook on Shell Platform "A" in Cook Inlet. Later, he worked in the Kuparuk Oilfield as a facility and drill site operator for ARCO Alaska while attending the University of Alaska, Anchorage, from which he graduated with a bachelor's degree in English. He attended Cornell University Law School and graduated with a Juris Doctor degree.

Before being elected to the state Senate, French was an assistant district attorney.

French has climbed Denali to the summit twice. His father, Bob French, is a county commissioner in Summit County, Colorado.

== Troopergate ==
In 2008, French was appointed by the Legislative Council to head an investigation into charges that Governor Sarah Palin "abused her office to get the Alaska public safety commissioner, Walt Monegan, fired."

== 2010 gubernatorial campaign ==
On July 1, 2009, French announced that he had filed a letter of intent with the Alaska Public Offices Commission to run for governor of Alaska. French received 18,018 votes (38.81%), losing the 2010 Democratic primary to former state representative Ethan Berkowitz, who received 22,607 votes (48.69%).

== 2014 gubernatorial campaign ==
French initially decided to run again for governor in 2014, but later decided to run instead for lieutenant governor. He won the Democratic nomination.

In September, Byron Mallott, the Democratic nominee for governor, merged his campaign with that of independent candidate Bill Walker. While Walker remained the gubernatorial candidate, Mallott ran for lieutenant governor as his running mate. Both French and Walker's original running mate, Craig Fleener, withdrew their candidacies. The Walker-Mallott ticket defeated that of incumbent Republican governor Sean Parnell and his running mate, Anchorage Mayor Dan Sullivan.

Party political offices
Preceded by Diane Benson	Democratic nominee for Lieutenant Governor of Alaska; Withdrew; 2014	Succeeded by Debra Call
