= Walt Monegan =

American politician

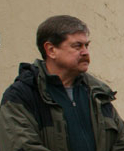
- Monegan in 2007

Commissioner of the Alaska Department of Public Safety
- Incumbent
- Assumed office April 1, 2016
- Governor: Bill Walker
- Deputy: William H. Comer
- Preceded by: Gary Folger
- In office 2006 – July 11, 2008
- Governor: Sarah Palin

Commissioner of Alaska Department of Corrections Acting
- In office 2015–2016
- Governor: Bill Walker
- Preceded by: Rod Taylor
- Succeeded by: Dean Williams

Chief of Police of Anchorage, Alaska
- In office February 2001–2006
- Mayor: George Wuerch; Mark Begich

Personal details
- Born: Walter Carleton Monegan III; May 1951 (age 75) Seattle, Washington
- Parent: Walter C. Monegan Jr. (father)

Walter Carleton Monegan III (born May 1951) is an American politician and the former Police Chief of Anchorage, Alaska, and later Commissioner of Public Safety for the state of Alaska. His dismissal in July 2008 by Alaska governor Sarah Palin drew considerable attention, particularly in the wake of Palin's selection as the Vice-Presidential nominee of the Republican Party the following month. Monegan accused Palin of not telling the truth about the reasons for his dismissal.

In April, 2016, Alaska Governor Bill Walker reappointed Monegan as the Commissioner of Public Safety.

== Early life ==
Walter Carleton Monegan III was born in Seattle, Washington in May 1951, the son of Elizabeth Hickling (née Clark) and Walter Carleton Monegan Jr. Monegan never knew his father, who died heroically in the Korean War on September 20, 1950, at age 19. The elder Monegan would be posthumously awarded the Medal of Honor for his actions.

Monegan grew up in the small village of Nyac, between Aniak and Bethel in rural Southwest Alaska. Monegan has described himself as part Irish and part Alaska Native, with combined Tlingit and Yupik ancestry. After graduating high school in Anacortes Washington He attended Alaska Methodist University for a year, and then joined the Marine Corps in 1970.

== Highlights of criminal justice career ==
The Anchorage Police Department hired Monegan as a patrolman in January 1974. He worked in every division of the Anchorage Police Department, including Internal Affairs, Crime Prevention, Communications, and Detectives. He also attended the Traffic Institute at Northwestern University, as well as the National Crime Prevention Institute at the University of Louisville. He earned a Bachelor of Arts in organizational administration from Alaska Pacific University.

In February 2001, Monegan was appointed Chief of Police by Anchorage Mayor George Wuerch. He served in that position until 2006. Later that year, Governor Sarah Palin appointed him Public Safety Commissioner. He held the latter position until his dismissal on July 11, 2008.

After the November 2015 dismissal of Commissioner of Corrections Rod Taylor, Monegan was appointed by Governor Bill Walker as the interim commissioner, serving until January 28, 2016, when he was replaced by Dean Williams.

== Personal life ==
Monegan is married to Terryene Mihara. They have four adult children from previous marriages and reside in the Anchorage suburb of Chugiak. Monegan's first wife was Fran Trantham, his second wife was Dr. Georgene Moldovan.

== Public Safety Commissioner dismissal ==
Governor Palin's Chief of Staff, Mike Nizich dismissed Public Safety Commissioner Walt Monegan on July 11, 2008, for the reason (according to Palin's spokesperson Sharon Leighow) that "the governor wanted to take DPS in a different direction" Nizich then offered Monegan the job as director of the ABC Board which he turned down. Anchorage blogger Andrew Halcro broke the story that Monegan was fired a week later after his refusal to fire Palin's ex-brother-in-law, a state trooper. Halcro was a two-term state representative and ran against Palin for governor in 2006, joining in the debates, finishing third with 9.47% of the votes, after Palin (48.33%) and former Governor Tony Knowles (40.97%).

Monegan said that he had resisted persistent pressure from the Governor, her husband, and her staff, including State Attorney General Talis Colberg, to fire Palin's ex-brother-in-law, state trooper Mike Wooten; Wooten was involved in a child custody battle with Palin's sister that included an alleged death threat against Palin's father. Monegan stated he learned an internal investigation had found all but two of the allegations to be unsubstantiated, and Wooten had been disciplined for the others three years prior. He told the Palins that there was nothing he could do because the matter was closed and Trooper Wooten had already been disciplined. When contacted by the press for comment, Monegan first acknowledged pressure to fire Wooten but said that he could not be certain that his own firing was connected to that issue; but as the governor's story changed, he came to believe that the dispute over Wooten was a major reason for his firing. Subsequent to Palin's VP pick, the McCain campaign claimed Monegan was fired for insubordination and called him a "rogue" but gave no explanation why Monegan had been offered the job of Director of the ABC Board if that were the case.

=== Finding of investigations ===
On October 10, 2008, the Alaska Legislative Council unanimously voted to release, without officially endorsing, the Branchflower Report in which Stephen Branchflower found that "Governor Sarah Palin abused her power as Governor ... [and] Walt Monegan's refusal to fire Trooper Michael Wooten ... was likely a contributing factor to his termination as Commissioner of Public Safety."

On 6 February 2009 the Alaska State Senate found ten Palin administration officials, together with Todd Palin, in contempt for refusing to attend hearings in the Branchflower investigation to which they had been subpoenaed. Three days later, Talis Colberg resigned his position as Attorney-General and left the State's employ.

The Associated Press reported on November 3, 2008, that an independent investigation subsequently conducted by the Alaska Personnel Board cleared Governor Palin of any abuse of power. The Personnel Board's three members were first appointed by Palin's predecessor, and Palin reappointed one member in 2008.

== Anchorage mayoral campaign ==
In December 2008, Monegan announced his run for Mayor of Anchorage. The Monegan for Mayor campaign was launched in January 2009. Monegan received 8.73% of the vote, coming in fourth.
