= Walter C. Monegan Jr. =

United States Marine Corps Medal of Honor recipient

Walter Carleton Monegan Jr.
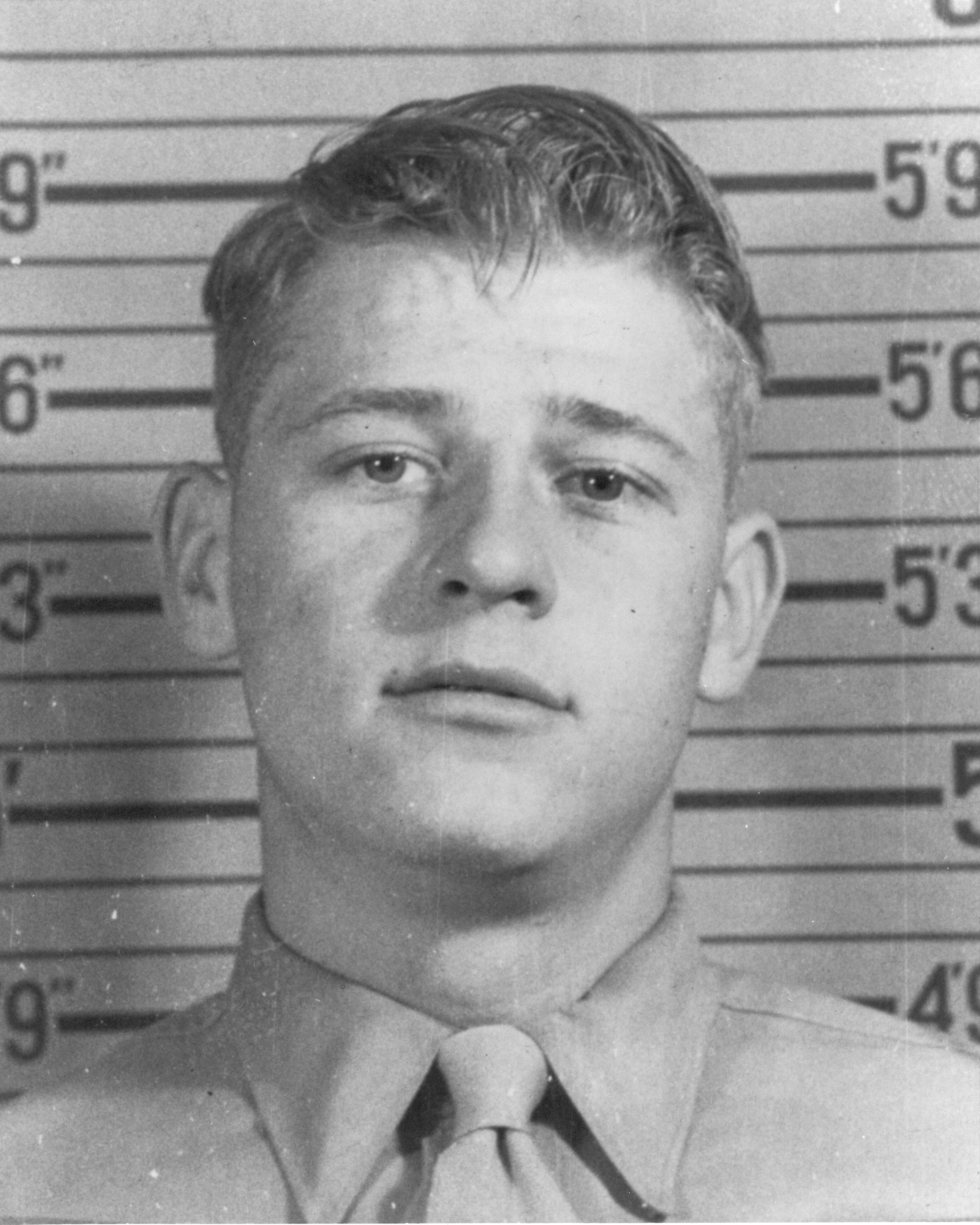
- Walter C. Monegan Jr.
- Born: December 25, 1930; Melrose, Massachusetts, United States
- Died: September 20, 1950 (aged 19) near Seoul, Korea
- Burial place: Arlington National Cemetery
- Children: Walt Monegan
- Military career
- Allegiance: United States
- Branch: United States Army; United States Marine Corps
- Service years: 1947–1948 (Army); 1948–1950 (Marine Corps)
- Rank: Private First Class
- Nickname: "Tank Killer"
- Units: Company F, 2nd Battalion 1st Marines, 1st Marine Division
- Conflicts: Korean War: Battle of Inchon †
- Awards: Medal of Honor; Purple Heart Medal; Hwarang Order of Military Merit (South Korea); Honorary Citizenship of Seoul

Walter Carleton Monegan Jr. (December 25, 1930 – September 20, 1950) was a United States Marine in the Korean War. On September 20, 1950, he was killed in action near Sosa-ri during the Battle of Inchon in South Korea. He was posthumously awarded the Medal of Honor for his actions above and beyond the call of duty on September 17 and 20, which helped to repulse a six-tank enemy attack on his battalion's position and then an overwhelming tank-infantry attack threatening to destroy his company at their position. He was killed after he proceeded to methodically knock out two of the three remaining enemy tanks at close range with his bazooka while under enemy fire.

The Medal of Honor was presented to his widow by Secretary of the Navy Dan A. Kimball, during ceremonies on February 8, 1952, in Washington, D.C.

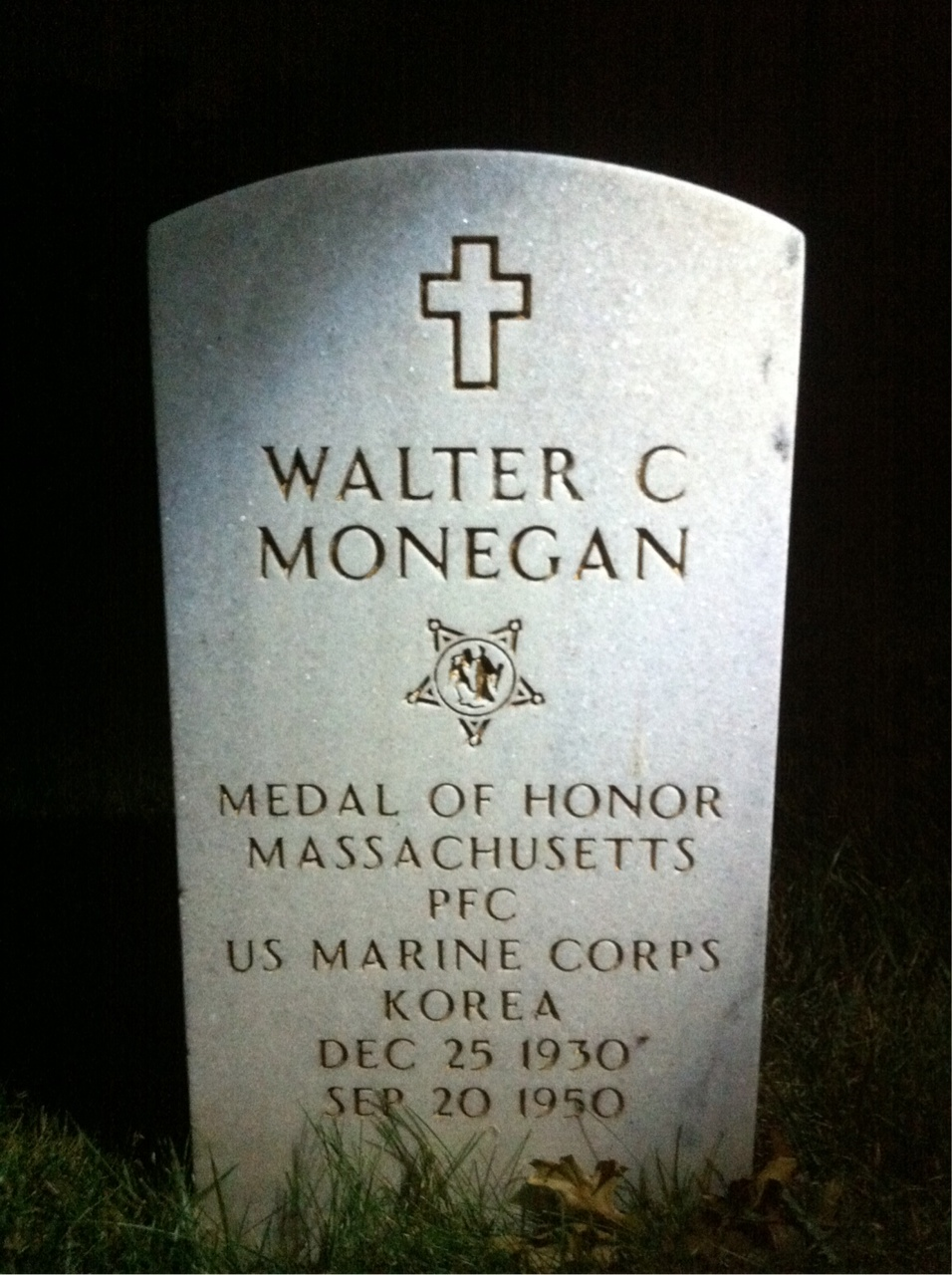
Grave of Walter C. Monegan Jr.

== Biography ==
Walter Carleton Monegan Jr. was born on December 25, 1930, in Melrose, Massachusetts. He attended schools in Malden, Reading, and Walpole, Massachusetts, and in November 1947 (before his seventeenth birthday), enlisted in the Army. He was discharged in January 1948, when his age was discovered, and enlisted in the United States Marine Corps on March 22, 1948, in Baltimore, Maryland.

After completing his recruit training at Parris Island, South Carolina, in June 1948, Monegan was ordered to San Francisco, where he sailed for duty in China with the 3rd Marines at Qingdao.

He returned to the United States in June 1949 and was stationed at Camp Pendleton, Oceanside, California, until June 1950, when he was ordered to the Marine Barracks, Naval Air Station, Seattle. While in Seattle, Monegan married. His son is Walt Monegan.

He re-enlisted on July 20, 1950, and the following month returned to Camp Pendleton, where he joined the 2nd Battalion, 1st Marines, 1st Marine Division.

== Korean War Service ==
Monegan shipped out to Korea where he participated in the Inchon Landing on September 15, 1950. His unit then moved on toward Seoul. Five days later, outside of Seoul near Sosa-ri, he was killed in action as he stopped an enemy three-tank attack, with infantry.

He was originally buried in Inchon, Korea, but was reinterred on July 19, 1951, in Arlington National Cemetery, Arlington, Virginia.

== Medal of Honor citation ==
The President of the United States takes pride in presenting the MEDAL OF HONOR posthumously to

PRIVATE FIRST CLASS WALTER C. MONEGAN JR.
UNITED STATES MARINE CORPS

for service as set forth in the following

CITATION:

For conspicuous gallantry and intrepidity at the risk of his life above and beyond the call of duty while serving as a Rocket Gunner attached to Company F, Second Battalion, First Marines, First Marine Division (Reinforced), in action against enemy aggressor forces near Sosa-ri, Korea, on 17 and September 20, 1950. Dug in a hill overlooking the main Seoul highway when six enemy tanks threatened to break through the Battalion position during a pre-dawn attack on September 17, Private First Class MONEGAN promptly moved forward with his bazooka under heavy hostile automatic weapons fire and engaged the lead tank at a range of less than 50 yards. After scoring a direct hit and killing the sole surviving tankman with his carbine as he came through the escape hatch, he boldly fired two more rounds of ammunition at the oncoming tanks, disorganizing the attack and enabling our tank crews to continue blasting with their 90-mm guns. With his own and an adjacent company's position threatened by annihilation when an overwhelming enemy tank-infantry force by-passed the area and proceeded toward the battalion Command Post during the early morning of September 20, he seized his rocket launcher and, in total darkness, charged down the slope of the hill where the tanks had broken through. Quick to act when illuminating shell hit the area, he scored a direct hit on one of the tanks as hostile rifle and automatic weapons fire raked the area at close range. Again exposing himself he fired another round to destroy a second tank and, as the rear tank turned to retreat, stood upright to fire and was fatally struck down by hostile machine-gun fire when another illuminating shell silhouetted him against the sky. Private First Class MONEGAN's daring initiative, gallant fighting spirit and courageous devotion to duty were contributing factors in the success of his company in repelling the enemy and his self-sacrificing efforts throughout sustain and enhance the highest traditions of the United States Naval Service. He gallantly gave his life for his country

== Awards and Decorations ==

1st row	Medal of Honor		
2nd row	Purple Heart	Combat Action Ribbon Retroactively Awarded, 1999	Navy Presidential Unit Citation with 1 Service star
3rd row	China Service Medal	National Defense Service Medal	Korean Service Medal with 1 Campaign star
4th row	Korean Presidential Unit Citation	United Nations Service Medal Korea	Korean War Service Medal Retroactively Awarded, 2003

== See also ==
- List of Medal of Honor recipients
- List of Korean War Medal of Honor recipients

== Sources ==
- Hoyt, Edwin P., On To The Yalu, (1984), ISBN 0-8128-2977-8
