= Talis J. Colberg =

American lawyer and politician

Mayor of the Matanuska-Susitna Borough, Alaska
- In office 2009–2010
- Preceded by: Curtis D. Menard
- Succeeded by: Larry DeVilbiss

Attorney General of Alaska
- In office December 13, 2006 – February 10, 2009
- Appointed by: Sarah Palin
- Preceded by: David W. Márquez
- Succeeded by: Daniel S. Sullivan

Member of the Matanuska-Susitna Borough Assembly from the 3rd District
- In office 2000–2006
- Preceded by: James W. Colberg
- Succeeded by: Michelle R. Church

Personal details
- Born: Talis James Colberg; August 25, 1958 (age 67) Alaska Territory, U.S.
- Spouse: Krystyna Colberg
- Education: Pacific Lutheran University (BA); Pepperdine University (JD); University of Alaska (PhD)

Talis James Colberg (born August 25, 1958) is an American lawyer and politician who was appointed by Governor Sarah Palin as the seventeenth attorney general of Alaska on December 13, 2006. Colberg resigned in February 2009 over controversy over the Alaska Public Safety Commissioner dismissal.

== Education ==
Colberg received his high school diploma from Palmer High School in 1976. He graduated from Pacific Lutheran University in 1979 with a Bachelor of Arts degree in oriental history. In 1983, Colberg received his Juris Doctor from Pepperdine University School of Law. He was admitted to the Alaska Bar in 1984. He earned a PhD in Arctic and Northern Studies in 2008 from the University of Alaska. His dissertation was "M.D. Snodgrass: The Founder Of The Alaska State Fair".

== Career ==
Before his appointment, Colberg worked as an associate attorney in the law firm Kopperud and Hefferan in Wasilla, Alaska from 1984 to 1985. From 1985 to 1992, he served as staff counsel to The Travelers Insurance Companies. Until his appointment as Attorney General for the State of Alaska, he was in sole practice from 1992 and was also an Adjunct History Instructor at Matanuska-Susitna College, teaching Eastern and Western Civilization.

In addition to his legal practice and teaching responsibilities, Colberg was elected to two three-year terms on the Matanuska-Susitna Borough Assembly. From 1992 until his appointment, he was a member of the Greater Palmer Chamber of Commerce. From 1998 to 2001 Colberg served as a member of the Matanuska-Susitna Valleys State Park Citizen Advisory Board. From 1995 to 2001 he served as a Director of the Board as well as Secretary and President for the Alaska State Fair, Inc. From 2002 through 2006, Colberg served on the board of directors for the Alaska Humanities Forum and was elected Chairman of that Board from 2004 to 2005. He is also a Past President of the Palmer Rotary Club, where he has been a member since 1992.

=== Attorney general ===
Colberg was appointed by Governor Sarah Palin as the seventeenth attorney general of Alaska on December 13, 2006.

As a result of the announcement of a legislative investigation of the Alaska Public Safety Commissioner dismissal, Colberg and his Department of Law began conducting a parallel inquiry in late July 2008 at the request of Governor Sarah Palin. Republican Rep. Jay Ramras (R), chair of the House Judiciary Committee, criticized the probe by Colberg . "I think it is harmful to the credibility of the administration, harmful to the process and harmful to all the parties involved … it's just the worst possible thing to be doing." Ramras said Colberg "needs to be very careful to avoid his review having any appearance of tampering with witnesses."

On September 12, 2008, the Alaska Senate Judiciary Committee issued subpoenas to thirteen potential witnesses, including Todd Palin, regarding the Monegan dismissal.

On September 16, Colberg notified the Legislature that state employees would disobey the subpoenas issued in the course of the investigation, unless either the full Senate or the legislature as a whole voted to compel their testimony. He stated that the officials were "loyal employees subject to the supervision of the Governor" and cited Governor Palin's decision not to co-operate with the inquiry, her statement that the subpoenas were "of questionable validity," and the pending lawsuits challenging the investigation. The subpoenas were authorized at a joint meeting of the House and Senate Judiciary Committees. The Alaska Senate Judiciary Committee, which voted to issue the subpoenas, was composed of three Republicans and two Democrats. The vote was 3–2. The House Judiciary Committee also voted, in an advisory capacity, in favor of authorizing the subpoenas. This vote was 5–0. Those five included three Republicans and two Democrats.

Colberg resigned as Attorney General on February 10, 2009, days after the legislature found Palin's husband Todd and nine state employees in contempt for refusing legislative subpoenas.

=== Later career ===
In 2009, Colberg was elected to the position of Matanuska-Susitna Borough mayor. He held the position until his resignation in August 2010 to take a position as director of Matanuska-Susitna College in Palmer, Alaska. Dr. Colberg has since announced he will be retiring as Director of Mat-Su College in October 2023.

== Personal ==
Colberg and his wife, Krystyna, have two daughters.

Political offices
Preceded by David W. Márquez	Attorney General of Alaska; 2006–2009	Succeeded by Daniel S. Sullivan
