= Alaska Legislative Council =

Standing committee of the Alaska Legislature

The Alaska Legislative Council is a standing committee of 14 members of the Alaska Legislature, that meets to conduct the business of the Legislature when it is not in session.

== Composition and authority ==
The Council is, per statute, a "permanent interim committee and service agency of the legislature." It is made up of the President of the Alaska Senate, six Senators appointed by the President, the Speaker of the Alaska House of Representatives, and six House members appointed by the Speaker.

Among the powers and duties of the Council are preparing recommendations for the Legislature, an annual review of statutes, conducting hearings and investigations, to manage Legislature operations when the Legislature is not in session, to manage an internship program for the Legislature, and to undertake any special projects assigned it by the Legislature.

== Notable events ==
In 1998 the Council sued the Federal Government over plans by the United States to take over Alaska's subsistence fishing program under the Alaska National Interest Lands Conservation Act, claiming the proposal would violate the Alaska Statehood Compact, which gave Alaska the right to manage its own fish and game resources. At issue was a conflict between the Alaska Constitution, which guaranteed equal access to all Alaskans, the Governor and Legislature, who wished to give rural residents priority, and the Federal government, which wished to provide for Native Alaskans.
