= Ikatan =

Ikatan may refer to:

== Places ==
- Ikatan Bay, Alaska, US
- Ikatan Peninsula, Alaska, US
- Ikatan, Alaska, US

== In Indonesia ==
- Ikatan Akuntan Indonesia, organization
- Ikatan Cendekiawan Muslim Indonesia, organization
- Ikatan Motor Indonesia, automotive
- Ikatan Pandu Indonesia, organization

== In Malaysia ==
- Parti Ikatan Bangsa Malaysia, political party
- Ikatan Masyarakat Islam Malaysia, political party
- Ikatan Relawan Rakyat Malaysia, paramilitary civil volunteer corps
- Ikatan Siswazah Muslim Malaysia, organization

== Acronyms ==
- IKATAN (Institut Kejuruteraan Teknologi Tenaga Nasional), Universiti Tenaga Nasional
