= US FWS Pribilof =

U.S. fisheries vessel

US FWS/NOAAS Pribilof
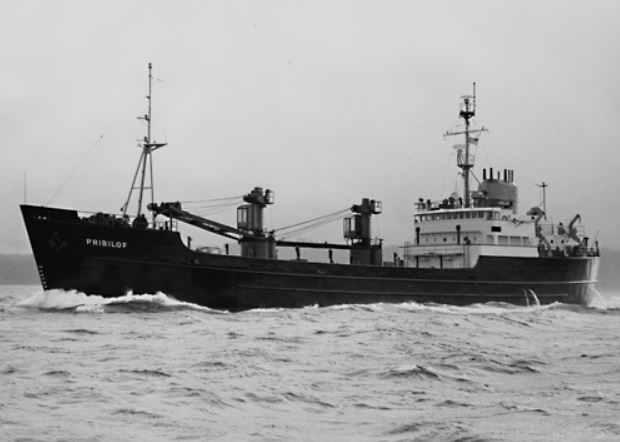

United States Army
- Name: United States Army FSR-791
- Builder: Higgins Industries, New Orleans, Louisiana
- Completed: 1954
- In service: 1954
- Fate: Transferred to U.S. Fish and Wildlife Service 1964

U.S. Fish and Wildlife Service
- Name: US FWS Pribilof
- Namesake: Pribilof Islands
- Acquired: From United States Army 1964
- Commissioned: 1964
- Home port: Seattle, Washington
- Fate: Transferred to U.S. National Oceanic and Atmospheric Administration 3 October 1970
- Notes: Operated and maintained by Fish and Wildlife Service′s Bureau of Commercial Fisheries 1964–1970

National Oceanic and Atmospheric Administration
- Name: NOAAS Pribilof
- Namesake: Previous name retained
- Acquired: From U.S. Fish and Wildlife Service 3 October 1970
- Decommissioned: 1975
- Home port: Seattle, Washington
- Identification: IMO number: 7742023; MMSI number: 366619000; Callsign: WRQF
- Fate: Sold 1975
- Status: Extant 2013 as commercial factory ship
- Notes: Operated and maintained by NOAA′s National Marine Fisheries Service 1970–1975

General characteristics
- Type: Refrigerated cargo ship
- Tonnage: 1,187 gross tons
- Length: 223 ft (68 m)
- Beam: 38.5 ft (11.7 m)
- Draft: 16 ft (4.9 m)
- Propulsion: Two 700-hp (592-kw) White-Superior Nationals diesel engines; three auxiliary engines
- Speed: 11 knots (20 km/h) (average)
- Range: 8,400 nautical miles (15,600 km)
- Crew: 19 (in 1973)
- Notes: Equipped with refrigeration capabilities

US FWS Pribilof was an American refrigerated cargo ship in commission in the fleet of the United States Fish and Wildlife Service (USFWS) from 1964 to 1970 and, as NOAAS Pribilof, in the fleet of the U.S. National Oceanic and Atmospheric Administration′s National Marine Fisheries Service (NMFS) from 1970 to 1975. She ran a cargo service between Seattle, Washington, and the Pribilof Islands – the last of the United States Government "Pribilof tenders" to carry out this function – and also made USFWS and NMFS research cruises in the Pribilofs.

Prior to her USFWS service, Pribilof was the United States Army cargo ship FSR-791. After the NMFS decommissioned her, she operated as a commercial cargo ship and later as a commercial factory ship.

== Construction and U.S. Army service ==
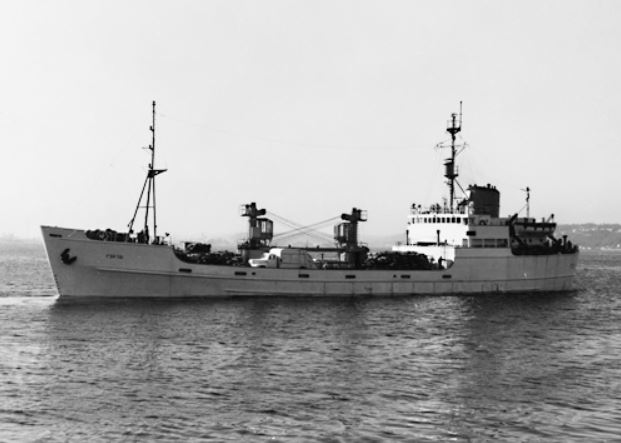
FSR-791 during her United States Army service.

The Alden firm designed the vessel as a steel-hulled coastal refrigerated cargo ship. Higgins Industries constructed her at New Orleans, Louisiana, in 1953–1954, and delivered her to the United States Army in 1954. The U.S. Army placed her in service as the "refrigerated freight and supply" vessel United States Army FSR-791, and later placed her in reserve.

== Fish and Wildlife Service ==
On 21 April 1910, the United States Congress assigned the responsibility for the management and harvest of northern fur seals, foxes and other fur-bearing animals in the Pribilof Islands in the Bering Sea, as well as for the care, education, and welfare of the Aleut communities in the islands to the United States Bureau of Fisheries. The Fish and Wildlife Service – renamed the United States Fish and Wildlife Service (USFWS) after a 1956 reorganization – assumed these responsibilities when it replaced the Bureau of Fisheries in 1940. Since 1917, the Bureau of Fisheries and Fish and Wildlife Service had operated a "Pribilof tender" – a dedicated supply vessel used to transport passengers and cargo to and from the Pribilof Islands – and by 1962 the Fish and Wildlife Service had deemed the most recent tender, US FWS Penguin II, too small to continue in the role and in need of replacement.

In October 1962, the U.S. Army agreed to loan FSR-791 to the USFWS's Bureau of Commercial Fisheries (BCF). The BCF renamed the reactivated ship Pribilof and placed her in service in 1963 as the newest Pribilof tender, basing her at Seattle and assigning her to support the USFWS's Marine Mammal Resources group. The USFWS found Pribilof well-suited to the role of transporting passengers and cargo to and from the Pribilofs and permanently removed Penguin II from service in 1963. In 1964, the Army transferred Pribilof to the USFWS.

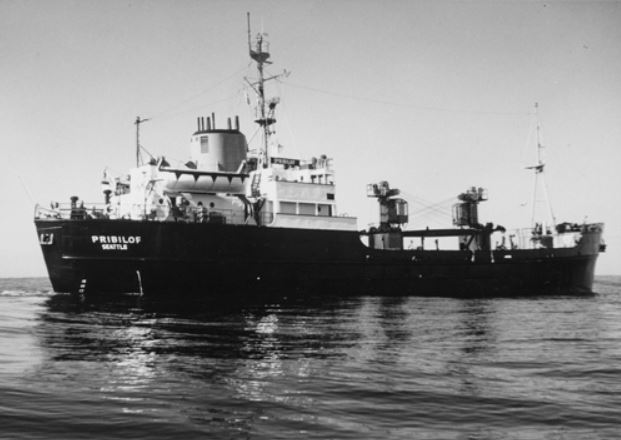
A starboard quarter view of Pribilof.

Pribilof usually made three to four voyages to the Pribilofs each year, and during visits to the islands she made shuttle trips between Saint Paul Island and St. George Island and conducted offshore pelagic fur seal research cruises. She also participated in search-and-rescue efforts during her voyages; notably, after the American Liberty ship Oduna was wrecked at Cape Pankof on Unimak Island in the Aleutian Islands in Alaska on 26 November 1965, Pribilof came to her assistance. and aided in the rescue of 37 survivors from Oduna.

Around 1968, a proposal was made to retire Pribilof and turn over her duties to chartered vessels as a means of saving the USFWS an estimated US$100,000 per year. A USFWS study of the idea concluded that the retirement of Pribilof would result in the loss of essential services, including the end of her support to pelagic fur seal research, the loss of an ability to transport doctors. medicines, and patients to and from the United States Public Health Service hospital in Anchorage, Alaska, and the loss of transportation services between Saint Paul and St. George Islands for outgoing United States Mail, incoming U.S. Mail that included breakables that could not be delivered via airdrops, perishable goods, emergency repair of equipment, emergency services, United States Government officials, teachers, students, and people involved in cultural and recreational exchanges. The ship remained in service.

== NOAA ==
On 3 October 1970, a major reorganization occurred which formed the National Oceanic and Atmospheric Administration (NOAA) under the United States Department of Commerce. As part of the reorganization, the Bureau of Commercial Fisheries was abolished and its missions and assets were transferred from the U.S. Fish and Wildlife Service to NOAA. At first, the major ships that were to constitute a new NOAA fleet reported to separate entities, with former United States Coast and Geodetic Survey ships subordinate to the new National Ocean Survey (the Coast and Geodetic Survey's successor organization within NOAA), while former Bureau of Commercial Fisheries ships reported to the Bureau's successor within NOAA, the new National Marine Fisheries Service (NMFS). During 1972 and 1973, however, the ships of the National Ocean Survey and National Marine Fisheries Service, as well as those of the Environmental Research Laboratories, integrated to form a consolidated and unified NOAA fleet, operated by the National Ocean Survey's Office of Fleet Operations. Pribilof, however, was not transferred to the combined NOAA fleet, and was operated and maintained directly by the NMFS until her decommissioning.

Pribilof remained active under the NMFS. For example, in 1973 – at which time she had a crew of 19 – she made five voyages between Seattle and the Pribilof Islands, delivering provisions to the inhabitants of the islands and returning to Seattle with sealskins, blubber, frozen seal meat for use as food on mink farms, and heavy equipment in need of repair. By this time, however, weekly commercial flights from Anchorage also were transporting mail, medicine, and perishable goods to and from St. Paul Island.

By 1966, the Aleut residents of Saint Paul Island already had begun a transition to self-sufficiency and local self-government, and in that year the U.S. Congress passed the Fur Seal Act, which required that the residents of the Pribilofs gain control of their local government and economy, including the harvesting of fur seals. Accordingly, the NMFS began turning over U.S. Government land and buildings and the fur seal operations in the Pribilofs to the local population in the 1970s. As part of this process, NOAA decommissioned Pribilof in 1975, bringing the 58-year history of the operation of "Pribilof tenders" by the U.S. Bureau of Fisheries (1917–1940), Fish and Wildlife Service (1940–1956), U.S. Fish and Wildlife Service Bureau of Commercial Fisheries (1956–1970), and NOAA's National Marine Fisheries Service (1970–1975) to an end.

== Later career ==
After Pribilof′s decommissioning, the NMFS sold her to the Aleut Corporation, which signed a long-term agreement with the NMFS to use her in transportation services between Seattle and Alaska and to supply the U.S. Government base at Adak in the Aleutian Islands.

Eventually, Pribilof was converted into a factory ship for fish processing at sea. Lafayette Fisheries purchased her in 1983, and Trident Seafoods acquired her in 2004. As of 2013. Trident Seafoods still owned and operated her, using her as a fish processor in the Bering Sea.

== See also ==
- NOAA ships and aircraft
