= Pauloff Harbor, Alaska =

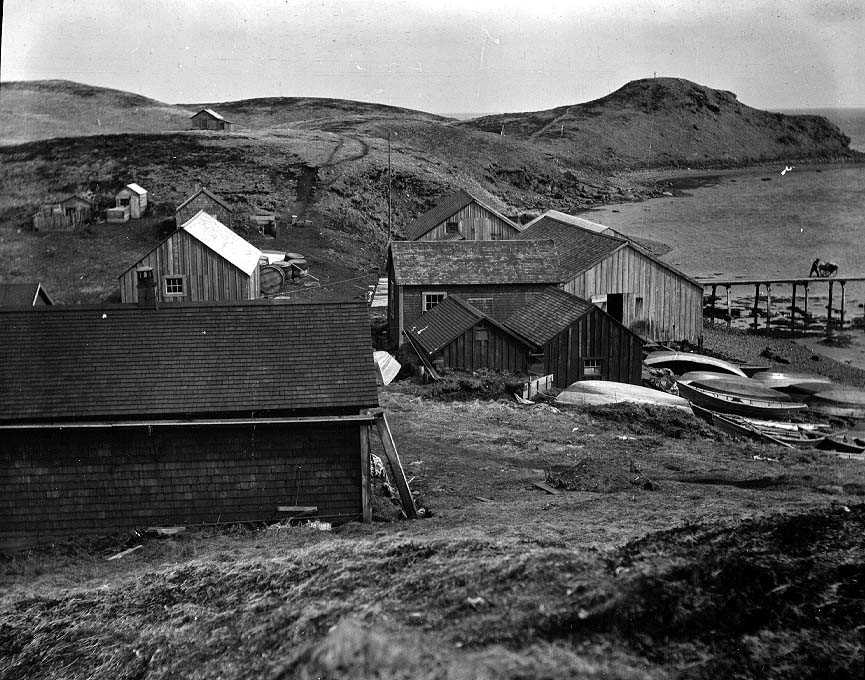
Union Fish Co. codfish station at Pavloff Harbor, May 1913

Pauloff Harbor is an unincorporated community with no year-round population on the west side of Pavlov Harbor on the northern coast of Sanak Island, 50 miles (80 km) southeast of False Pass, in the Aleutians East Borough of the U.S. state of Alaska. The primary means of transportation is boats and float planes from False Pass or King Cove. While a post office was established in 1949, the village has no permanent population at present or public facilities, although a village corporation operates from a post office box in Sand Point, where most of the corporation shareholders live.

== Demographics ==
Historical population
Census	Pop.	Note	%±
1920	62		—
1930	52		−16.1%
1940	61		17.3%
1950	68		11.5%
1960	77		13.2%
1970	39		−49.4%
1980	0		−100.0%
U.S. Decennial Census

Pauloff Harbor first appeared on the 1920 U.S. Census as an unincorporated village as "Panloff Harbor." In 1930, it returned as "Pavlof Harbor." In 1940, it returned simply as "Pavlof." In 1950, it returned again as "Pavlof Harbor" (with the alternative of "Pauloff Harbor"). In 1960–70, it continued to return as "Pavlof Harbor." In 1980, it was classified as an Alaska Native Village Statistical Area (ANVSA) and returned as the present spelling of "Pauloff Harbor." However, it returned no residents. It has not reported separately on any censuses since.

== Pauloff Harbor Seaplane Base ==
Pauloff Harbor Seaplane Base
- IATA: none; ICAO: none; FAA LID: KPH

Summary
- Airport type: Public
- Owner: Public comain
- Serves: Pauloff Harbor (Sanak Island)
- Elevation AMSL: 0 ft / 0 m
- Coordinates: 54°27′33″N 162°41′37″W

Map
- Location of airport in Alaska

Runways
Direction	Length		Surface
Direction	ft	m	Surface
N/S	3,000	914	Water
- Source: Federal Aviation Administration

Pauloff Harbor Seaplane Base (FAA LID: KPH) is a public-use seaplane base in Pauloff Harbor.

=== Facilities ===
Pauloff Harbor Seaplane Base has one seaplane landing area designated N/S which measures 3,000 by 500 feet (914 x 152 m).

== See also ==
- Pauloff Harbor Village
