= Isanotski Strait =

Strait in Alaska, United States

Coordinates: 54.829372°N 163.380372°W

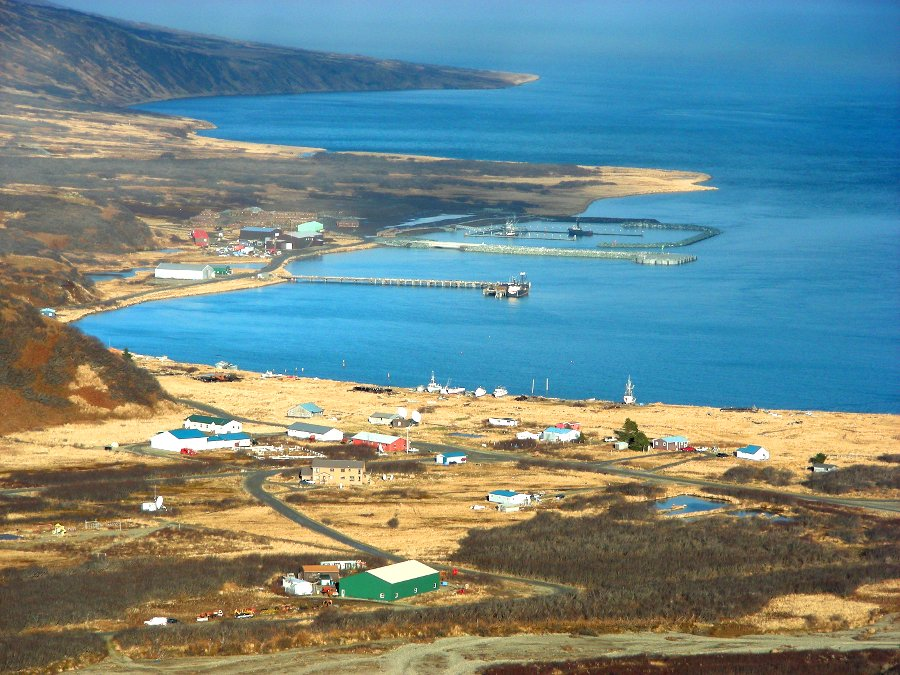
The village of False Pass, Alaska on Isanotski Strait

Isanotski Strait is a strait connecting the northern Gulf of Alaska with the Bering Sea, in the U.S. state of Alaska. Isanax̂ (variously spelled Issannakh, Isanak etc.) is the Aleut name for present day Isanotski Strait, and means gap, hole, rent, or tear in the Aleut language which was rendered as Isanotski (or Issanakskie, Isanotskoi, Isanakh etc.) in transliterated Russian. The strait appears as Исанакъ in 1802 and Исаноцкый in 1844 on Russian maps.

The strait is used by most vessels that are less than 200 feet (61 m) in length, when traveling between northern Alaska and points in southwestern and southeastern Alaska and the "lower 48" states. The strait was formerly called False Pass, and the city of False Pass, Alaska is situated on Isanotski Strait.

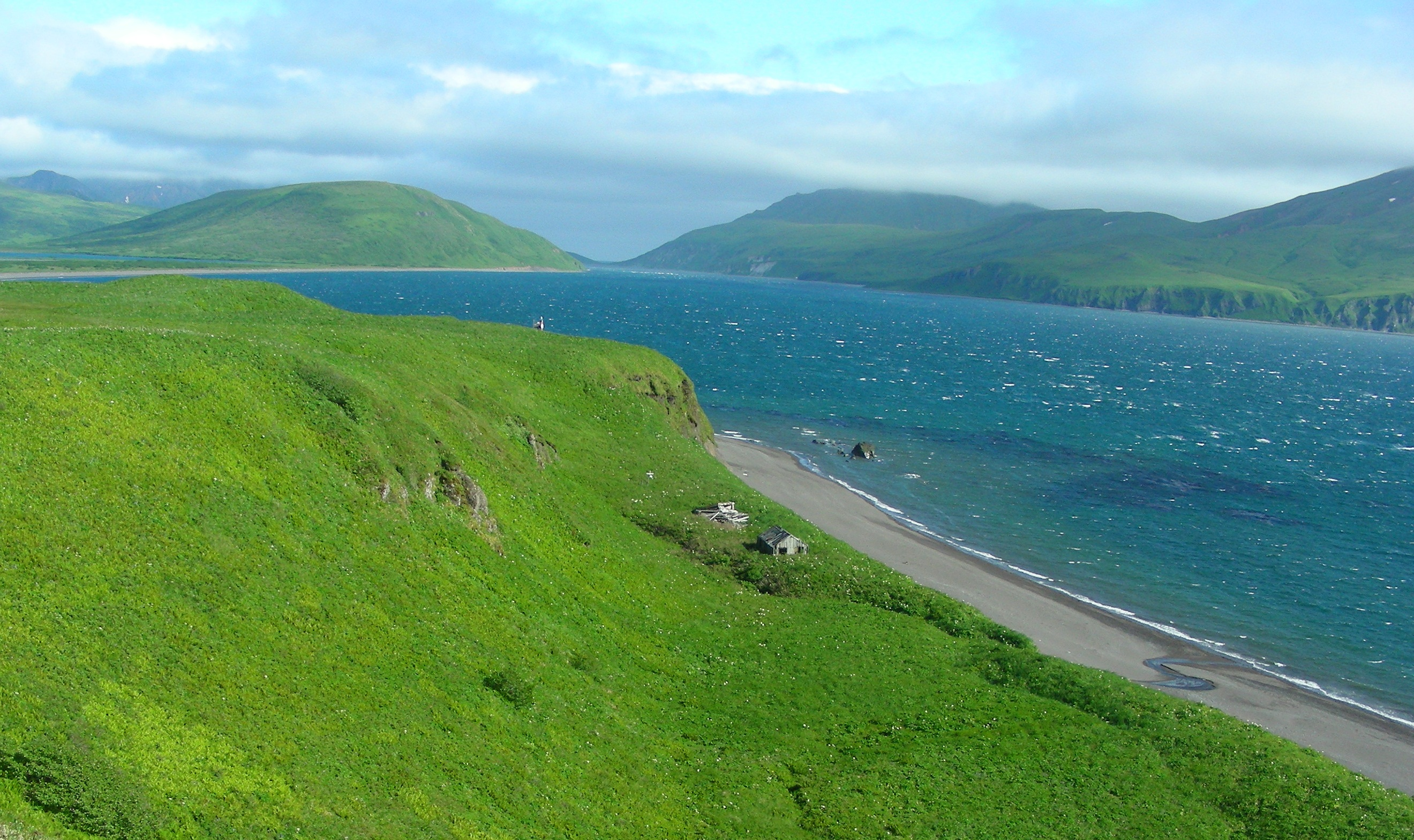
Ikatan Bay in foreground, with entrance to Isanotski Strait in background.

== Geography ==
Isanotski Strait and Ikatan Bay separate the Alaska Peninsula from Unimak Island, the easternmost of the Aleutian Islands.

Isanotski Strait has its southerly entrance at the northwest end of Ikatan Bay. Traders Cove, on the eastern side of Isanotski Strait about 7 miles above its entrance from Ikatan Bay, is a good anchorage. Morzhovoi, a mission and native village, is on the south side.

The northern entrance has strong tidal currents, which are affected by strong northerly or southerly winds. There is an extensive shoal, or flat, in the northern and widest portion of the strait, lying to the east of the channel way and south of the outlet to the Bering Sea. Just outside this outlet, at a distance of between 1 and 2 miles (1.6 and 3.2 km), is a line of shoals, with breakers, that extend from the northeast point of Unimak Island in a northeasterly direction for 5–6 miles (8.0–9.7 km) parallel with the coast.

The mean rise and fall of tides in Ikatan Bay is 4.5 feet. In the narrow southern part of Isanotski Strait, the tidal currents have a velocity of 7 to 9 miles or more, and it is said that there is practically no slack and the current turns about three hours after high or low water in Ikatan Bay.

== History ==
This strait was used for safe passage for millennia by Aleuts and later by the Russians during their colonization of the area in Russian America.

False Pass is an early English name for the strait because it was thought to be impassable for deep draft vessels at the northern end.

In the 1900s it was used by light-draft craft built in Puget Sound ports for service on the Yukon River, in making the passage from Puget Sound ports to St. Michael. It was the practice for these vessels to go through the inland passages of Southeast Alaska, out through Cross Sound, and coast around, watching the weather, going behind the islands off the Alaska Peninsula and through Isanotski Strait or Unimak Pass. Isanotski Strait was preferable to Unimak Pass for light-draft river vessels because it was nearer and had many sheltered anchorages and places where fresh water could be obtained.
