= Ikatan Bay =

Bay in Alaska, United States

Coordinates: 54.79°N 163.29°W

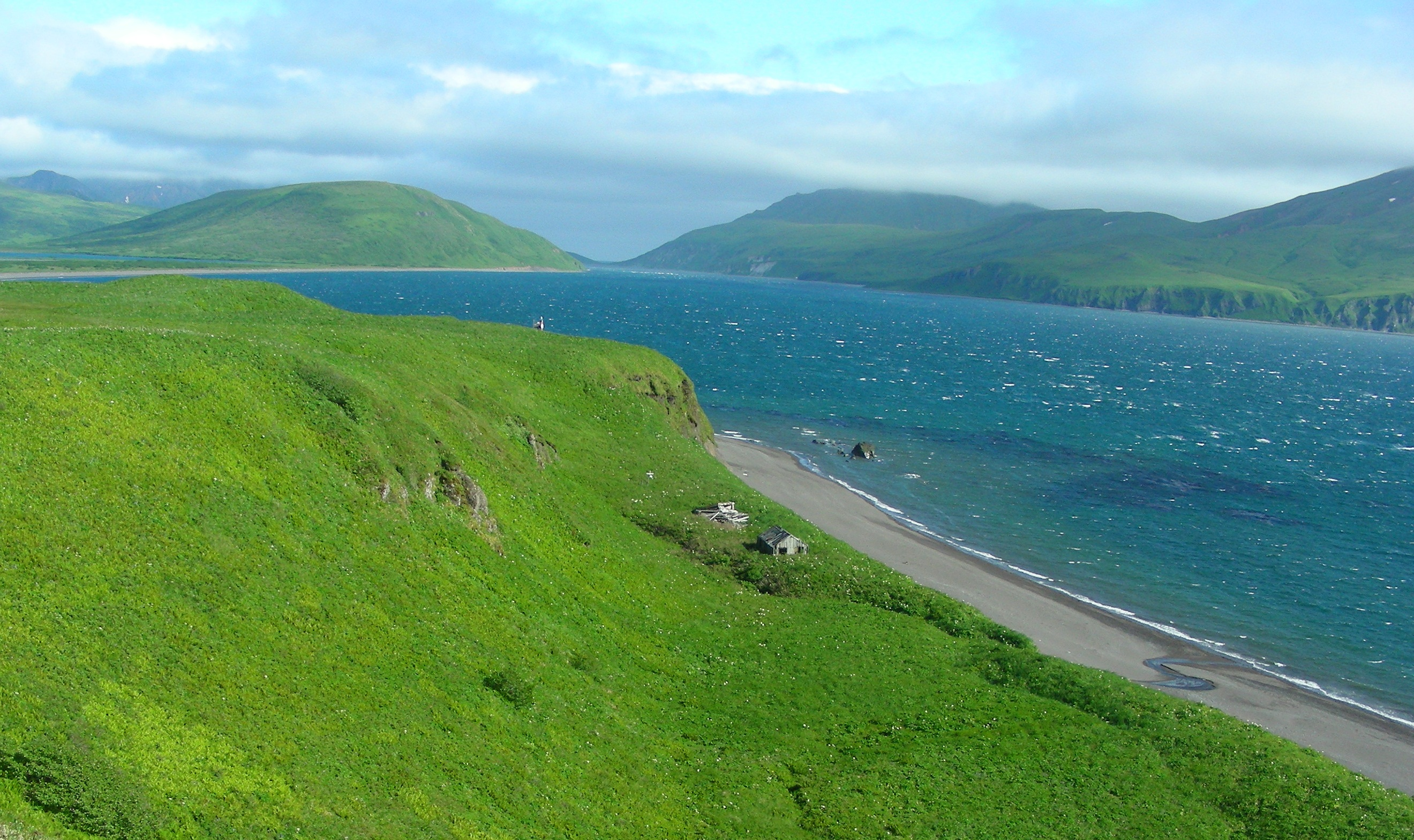
Ikatan Bay in the foreground, Isanotski Strait's entrance in the background, Unimak Island on the left, the Alaska Peninsula on the right.

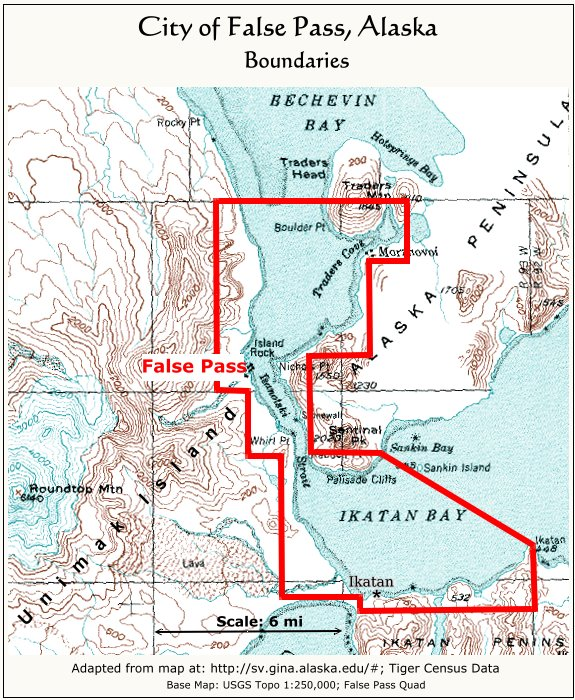
False Pass, Alaska is northwest of Ikatan Bay

Ikatan Bay is a waterway in the U.S. state of Alaska. The bay and Isanotski Strait separate Unimak Island from the Alaska Peninsula. They have been used by light-draft craft, intended for service on the Yukon River, in making the passage from Puget Sound ports to St. Michael.

Ikatan Bay, on the north side of Ikatan Peninsula, is about 3.75 miles wide and 5 miles long in a southwest direction, and is free from surf except with winds from north to east. Sankin Island, lying 1 mile from the north side of the bay, is high, with a rounded, grassy summit; a reef extends from the island toward the nearest point of the peninsula. Sankin Bay is northwest of Sankin Island. The southwest end of Ikatan Bay is separated from Otter Cove by an isthmus, 20 to 30 feet high; a river enters Ikatan Bay at the middle of this lowland, and a submerged spit, which drops off abruptly to over 20 fathoms, makes off from its mouth. Approaching Ikatan Bay from southwestward the only known danger is Pankof Breaker, lying a little over 2 miles from the southeast point at the entrance to East Anchor Cove. There is a good anchorage in the bight on the west side of Ikatan Point. The south point at the entrance to the bay in about 9 fathoms, sand and mud bottom, with protection from winds from southeast to southwest. The best anchorage in Ikatan Bay from all southerly winds is on its south side off the low divide loading to Dora Harbor. Anchorage can also be made on the north side of the bay, 2.25 miles westward of Sankin Island, in 10 fathoms, sandy bottom, sheltered from ordinary northerly winds, but badly exposed to easterly and southerly winds. Isanotski Strait has its southerly entrance at the northwest end of Ikatan Bay. Traders Cove, on the eastern side of Isanotski Strait about 7 miles above its entrance from Ikatan Bay, is a good anchorage. Morzhovoi, a mission and native village, is on the south side. The mean rise and fall of tides in Ikatan Bay is 4.5 feet. In the narrow southern part of Isanotski Strait the tidal currents have a velocity of 7 to 9 miles or more, and it is said that there is practically no slack and that the current turns about three hours after high or low water in Ikatan Bay.
