= Sanak Island =

Island in Alaska, United States

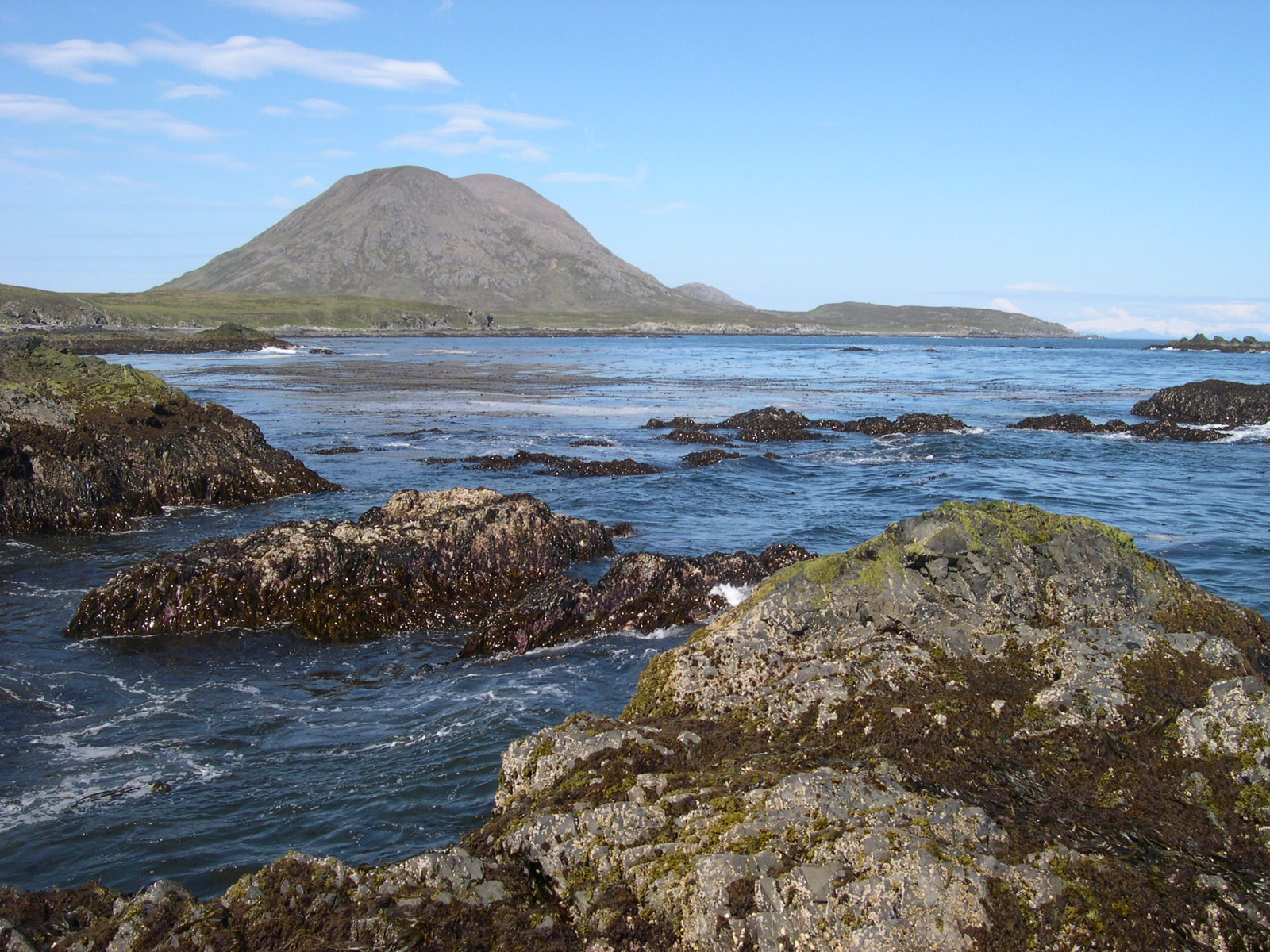
Sanak Peak from the northern side of Sanak Island

Sanak Island (Aleut: Sanaĝax) is an island in the Fox Islands group of the Aleutian Islands in the U.S. state of Alaska. It is located at 54°25′47″N 162°42′32″W. Although currently uninhabited, it was historically the home of the Sanak Aleutians, who presently own the island via the Sanak Corporation. The island is accessible by fishing vessel, taking about five hours to cross the roughly 40 mile distance from King Cove to Sanak.

== Geography ==
Sanak Island is part of the eastern Aleutians off the southern side of the Alaska Peninsula, lying south of the Ikatan Peninsula area of Unimak Island. Sanak Island and Caton Island are the largest islands in the Sanak Islands subgroup of the Fox Islands. The island is mostly low-lying, treeless, and contains many marshes, reefs, and shoals off the shore. Its highest point is Sanak Peak, which rises to approximately 1,740 ft (530 m).

Sanak is surrounded by numerous bays and anchorages, including Company Harbor or Sanak Harbor on the northwest side, Pauloff or Pavlof Harbor on the north coast, Johnson Bay, Sandy Bay, Peterson Bay, Salmon Bay, and Finneys Bay.

== History ==
Like many of the other Aleutian Islands, Sanak was inhabited by the Unangax̂/Aleut people for thousands of years. Archaeological surveys as part of the Sanak Biocomplexity Project have uncovered a roughly 7,000 year record of inhabitation spread over 100 ancient village sites show a long maritime economy centered on the sea. Archaeological remains from ancient dumpsites show a broad subsistence base that included seafood, marine mammals, and occasional terrestrial animals brought from the Alaska Peninsula.

Sanak's location placed it within a wider North Pacific cultural and trade network. Obsidian found on Sanak has been traced to Okmok volcano on Umnak Island, about 250 miles away, while other stone materials were transported from the Alaska Peninsula.

=== European contact ===
Russians first learned of Sanak Island in 1762, when the fur trader Stepan Glotov encountered a Sanak Aleut boy who had been taken prisoner by Kodiak Islanders. According to historical accounts, the boy was taken aboard Glotov's ship and told them of the sea otter grounds around the island. A Russian vessel first landed on Sanak in 1771. After an initially friendly encounter, the relationship between the Russians and the Sanak Aleutians deteriorated after the leader took hostages and became involved in conflict with the Sanak and Alaska Peninsula Aleuts. They left Sanak the following summer, after attacks, food shortages, deaths, and disease.

Captain James Cook's expedition passed the island in 1778, where the crew reportedly caught over 100 halibut in a four-hour period, leading Cook to call the islands the "Halibut Isles". During the same visit, the expedition encountered an Aleut man in a baidarka, whom Cook compared to Indigenous people he had seen earlier in Prince William Sound and Kodiak.

Gradually the Russians returned, and began trading and working with Sanak hunters to collect otter pelts. In 1828, the administrators of Russian America removed the island's population to Belkofski on the Alaska Peninsula in order to maintain access to the sea otter hunting grounds in surrounding waters.

=== American period ===
Sanak remained uninhabited until after the 1867 Alaska Purchase, where the Aleutians gradually returned to resume hunting and fishing, this time largely under the employment of Americans. In 1873 the Alaska Commercial Company built a trading post at the northwest end of the island in an area now known as Company Harbor, and sea-otter hunting resumed until their depletion; the practice was banned in 1911 for conservation. By 1886 the Americans had also established commercial codfishing operations on Sanak, and catches from the area were shipped by schooner to market, until their depletion in the 1930s. With minimal economic opportunity, the island gradually became uninhabited again as locals moved away.

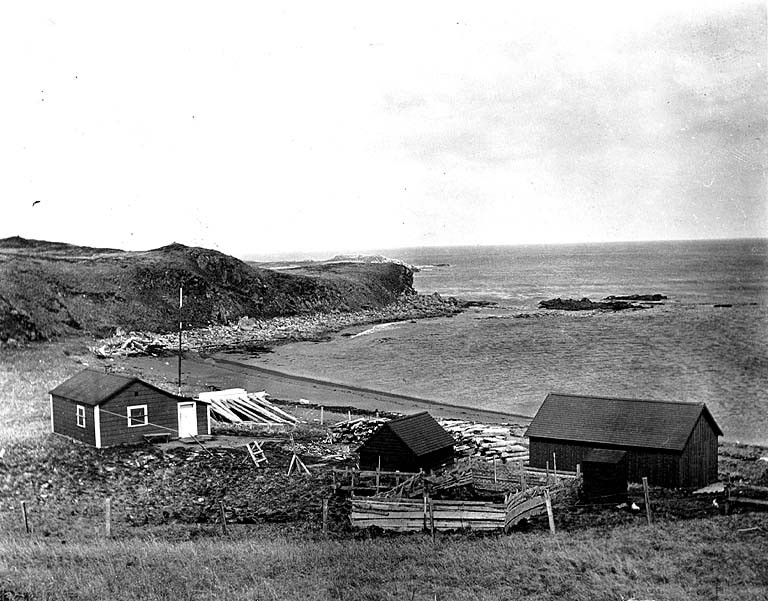
Home of a cod fisherman on Sanak Island, photo by John Nathan Cobb

Two famous shipwrecks, one in 1906 and another in 1943, occurred near Sanak. The U.S. Navy operated a small naval base at Sanak Island during World War II.

As per the Alaska Native Claims Settlement Act of 1971, the Sanak and Pauloff Harbor Aleut community were represented through the Sanak Corporation and the Pauloff Harbor Village, and the land was transferred to the Corporation.

Although Sanak is no longer occupied, Sanak Corporation members occasionally visit to harvest the feral cattle that live there. The cattle are free-roaming descendants of earlier cattle introduced for small-scale ranching during the commercial period, and subside on grass and kelp.

== Archaeology ==
In 2004, 2006, and 2007 teams of archeologists and ecologists visited Sanak Island to study the effects of long-term human occupation on the island. Over 100 archeological sites were excavated with the oldest sites dating to 5600 years before present.

Researchers, led by investigators from Idaho State University studied both the living plants and animals as well as the remains of food animals such as fish, sea mammals, and shellfish preserved in archeological sites.
