= Ikatan, Alaska =

Unincorporated community in the state of Alaska, United States

Coordinates: 54°45′00″N 163°18′30″W

Ikatan is an unincorporated community in the Aleutians East Borough of the U.S. state of Alaska. Named after Ikatan Peninsula, it is located on Unimak Island.

== Demographics ==
Historical population
Census	Pop.	Note	%±
1950	29		—
U.S. Decennial Census

Ikatan first appeared on the 1950 U.S. Census as an unincorporated area. This was the only time it appeared on the census as a separate community. It had reported under Unimak (population 59) in 1930 and 1940 (88), but this also included False Pass. As of 2010, the former village area is now partly located within False Pass.
