= Pauloff Harbor Village =

Federally recognized Alaska Native tribe

- People: Aleuts
- Headquarters: Sand Point, Alaska, US

Government
- Chief: George P. Gunderson

Pauloff Harbor Village is a federally recognized Aleut Alaska Native tribal entity.

== About ==
Pauloff Harbor Village is headquartered at Sand Point on Popof Island in the Shumagin Islands of the Aleutians East Borough. It is one of three federally recognized Aleut tribes in Sand Point.

The tribe is named after Pauloff Harbor off the coast of Sanak Island. Sanak Island is now unpopulated and the former community of Pauloff Harbor is a ghost town. Sanak Island had been populated by Aleut people until 1828 when Russian colonial administrators displaced the population.

As of 2005, the tribe had 51 enrolled citizens.

== See also ==
- List of Alaska Native tribal entities
- Pauloff Harbor, Alaska
