= Ikatan Peninsula =

Peninsula on Unimak Island, Alaska, United States

Coordinates: 54.73°N 163.20°W

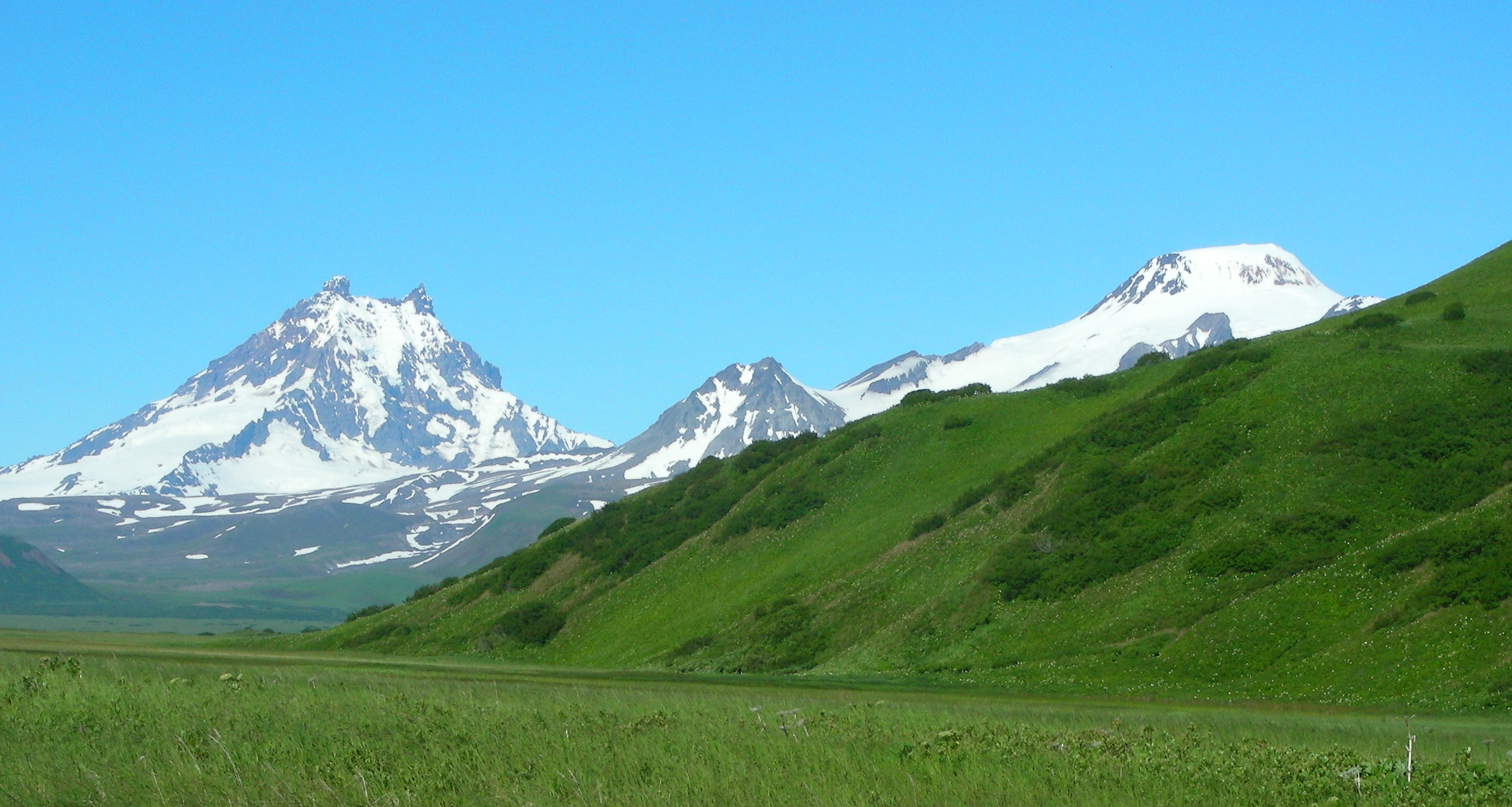
View near the base of Ikatan Peninsula, south of False Pass, with Roundtop volcano in foreground and Isanotski Peaks just south of Roundtop.

Ikatan Peninsula is the southeastern extremity of Unimak Island in the U.S. state of Alaska.

The peninsula is approximately 13 miles long. It is divided into three mountain masses and from Unimak Island by low depressions which extend from West Anchor Cove to East Anchor Cove and from Dora Harbor and Otter Cove to Ikatan Bay. Cape Pankof, the eastern end of Ikatan Peninsula, terminates in three cliffs on the southern side, the highest about 1,200 feet, but on the northern side there is a gentle slope to the low isthmus between East and West Anchor coves. Some bare rocks lie within 0.25 mile from the cape, on the southern and eastern sides. Pankof Breaker lies a little over 2 miles from the southeast point at the entrance to East Anchor Cove. Bird Island, about 0.5 mile in extent, 750 feet high, and precipitous, lies 2 miles from the south coast of Ikatan Peninsula, off the entrance to Dora Harbor, and 8 miles westward from Cape Pankof. A sunken reef connects the island with the western point at the entrance to Dora Harbor. East Anchor Cove is large and is on the north side of Cape Pankof. West Anchor Cove is exposed to southerly weather, but with East Anchor Cove on the other side of the cape, safe and sheltered anchorage from any ordinary weather can be found in one or the other. Dora Harbor is on the south side of Ikatan Peninsula, 2 miles north of Bird Island. The entire shore of the harbor is fringed by ledges, partly bare at low water, to a distance of about 300 yards. Otter Cove is an open bight at the northwest end of Ikatan Peninsula. It is exposed to southerly winds and to the Pacific swell, and there is always a heavy surf. Northerly winds blow over the low isthmus separating it from Ikatan Bay. A rock awash at low water lies over 0.50 mile from the shore of Ikatan Peninsula and 3.5 miles northwestward from Bird Island. The unincorporated community of Ikatan is located on Unimak Island and is named after the peninsula.
