= Morzhovoi, Alaska =

Unincorporated community in the state of Alaska, United States

Coordinates: 54°54′25″N 163°19′07″W

Morzhovoi (also known as Morzhovia, New or Old Morzhovoi, Protassof, or Selo Morzhovskoe) is an unincorporated community in the Aleutians East Borough of the U.S. state of Alaska. The name was published by the Russian Hydrographic Department on an 1847 map; it originates from a Russian phrase meaning Walrus Village.

== Demographics ==
Historical population
Census	Pop.	Note	%±
1880	100		—
1890	68		−32.0%
1920	60		—
1930	22		−63.3%
1940	17		−22.7%
U.S. Decennial Census

Morzhovoi first reported on the 1880 U.S. Census as the unincorporated Aleut village of "Protassof." It included 77 Aleuts, 21 Creoles (Mixed Russian & Native) and 2 Whites. It reported on the 1890 U.S. Census as Morzhovoi. The population included the native village and the schooners Olga, Lewis & Emma. It did not report again until 1920, and then again in 1930 and 1940. It did not report after that and has since been annexed into False Pass.
