= Cape Pankof =

Cape in Alaska, United States

Cape Pankof (also spelled Pan'kov and Pankov) and Pankov Rock are located on Unimak Island in the Aleutian Islands in the U.S. state of Alaska, at 54°39′31″N 163°04′11″W and 54°42′N 163°0′W respectively. They were named by Russian explorer Gavril Sarychev after the Aleut Toien (Chief) Sergey Pan'kov in 1791.
