= False Pass, Alaska =

City in Alaska, United States

False Pass Isanax̂
- City
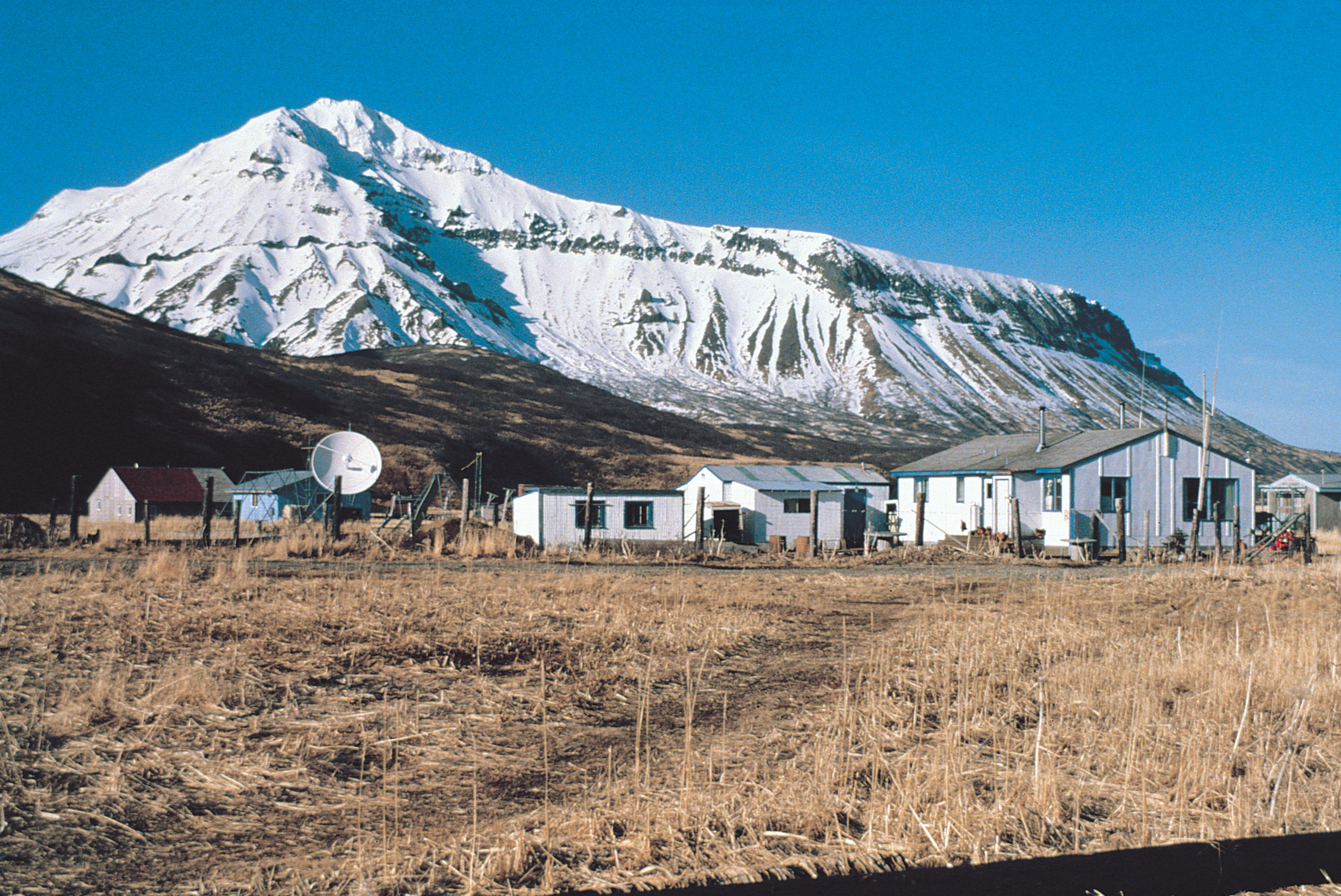
- False Pass looking north

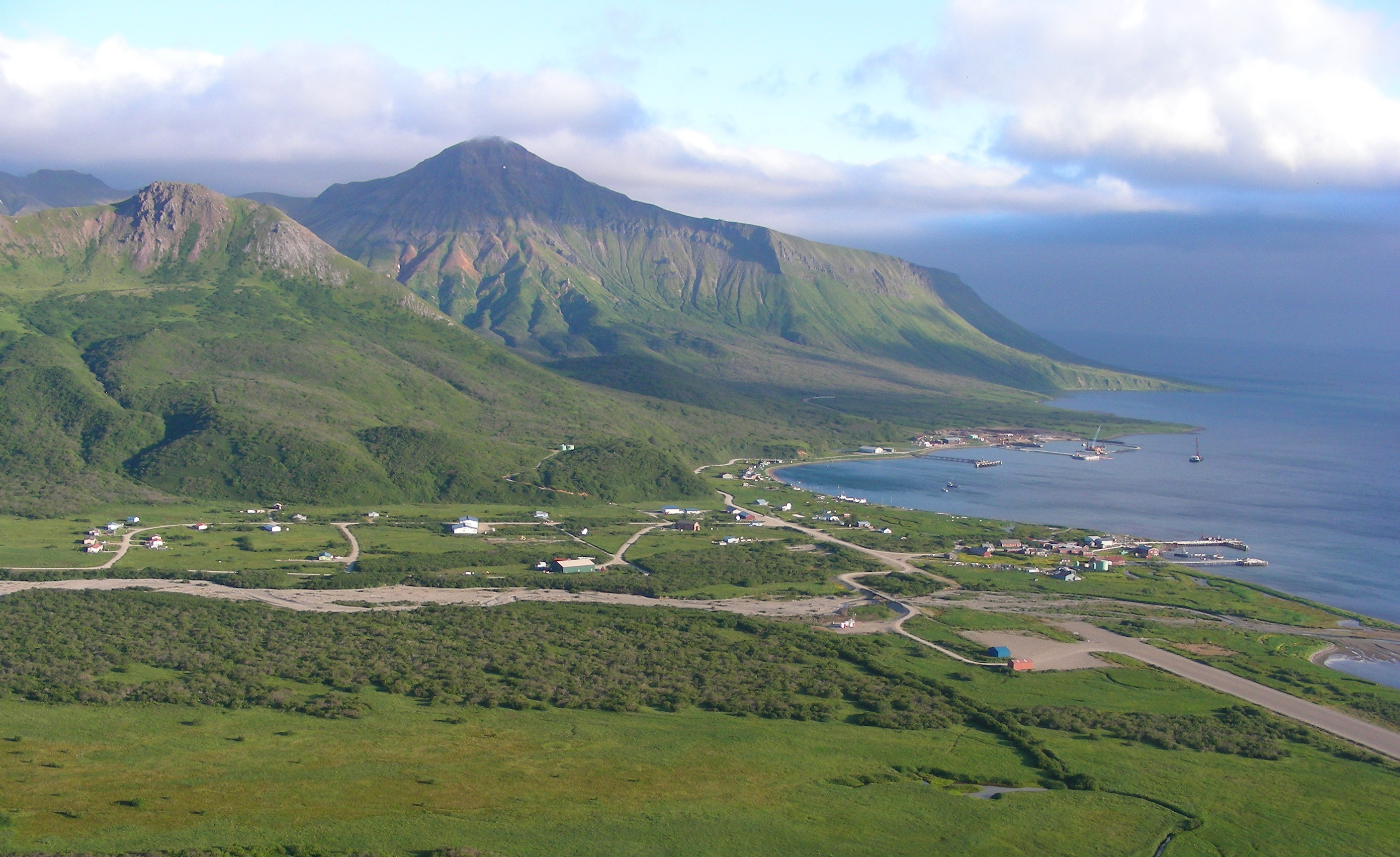
- Nickname: "The Pass" The center of False Pass as seen from the south.

- Location in Alaska
- Coordinates: 54°51′17″N 163°24′51″W
- Country: United States
- State: Alaska
- Borough: Aleutians East
- Incorporated: October 19, 1990

Government
  - Mayor: Nicole Hoblet
  - Borough mayor: Alvin D. Osterback
  - State senator: Lyman Hoffman (D)
  - State rep.: Bryce Edgmon (I)

Area
  - Total: 65.54 sq mi (169.76 km^{2})
  - Land: 25.07 sq mi (64.93 km^{2})
  - Water: 40.48 sq mi (104.83 km^{2})
- Elevation: 30 ft (9 m)

Population (2020)approximately 35 permanent residents
  - Total: 397
  - Density: 15.8/sq mi (6.11/km^{2})
- Time zone: UTC-9 (Alaska (AKST))
  - Summer (DST): UTC-8 (AKDT)
- ZIP codes: 99583
- Area code: 907
- FIPS code: 02-24660
- GNIS feature ID: 1418574
- Website: City Website

False Pass, also known as Isanotski (Russian: Исаноцкий) or Isanax̂ (Aleut), is a city on Unimak Island, in the Aleutians East Borough of southwestern Alaska, United States. The population was 397 in the 2020 census, but only 35 are resident year-round; many fish processing plant workers are seasonal.

== History ==
False Pass is an early English name for Isanotski Strait on which the city of False Pass is located. The strait was called "False Pass" because it was thought to be impassable for deep draft vessels at the northern end. A salmon cannery was built on the Unimak Island side of the strait in 1919 which provided the nucleus for the modern settlement. A U.S. post office with the name of False Pass was established in 1921 which gave official status to the community.

Commercial fishing for salmon, cod, halibut and crab continues to be the core of the community's lifestyle and economy.

== Geography ==
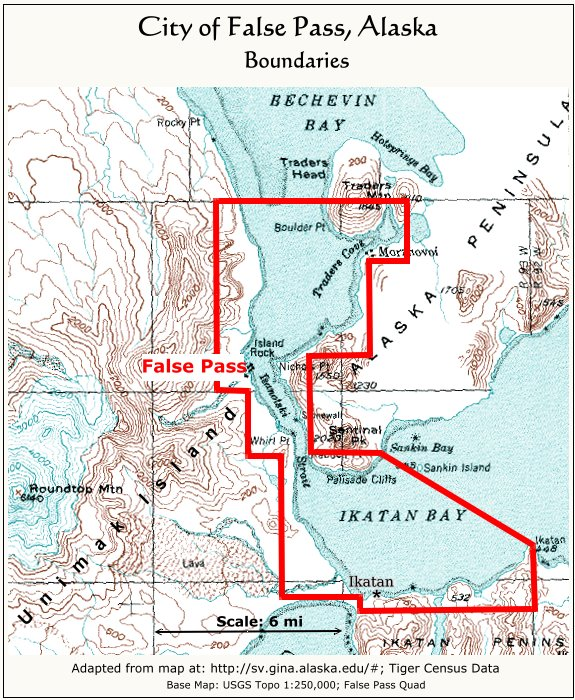
Boundaries of the city of False Pass, Alaska

False Pass is at 54°51′17″N 163°24′51″W. It is near the eastern end of Unimak Island, in the Aleutian Islands chain. Part of the city (26.093 km^{2}, or 10.075 sq mi) is on the mainland's westernmost tip Alaska Peninsula, across the Isanotski Strait (about 600 meters at the closest point), although that section is nearly unpopulated. The city boundaries include the abandoned villages of Morzhovoi and Ikatan.

According to the U.S. Census Bureau, the city has a total area of 68.3 square miles (177 km^{2}), of which 26.9 square miles (70 km^{2}) is land and 41.4 square miles (107 km^{2}) (60.63%) is water.

== Transportation ==
Boats and aircraft are the only transportation to and from False Pass. Aircraft use False Pass Airport.

== Demographics ==
Historical population
Census	Pop.	Note	%±
1930	59		—
1940	88		49.2%
1950	42		−52.3%
1960	41		−2.4%
1970	62		51.2%
1980	70		12.9%
1990	68		−2.9%
2000	64		−5.9%
2010	35		−45.3%
2020	397		1,034.3%
U.S. Decennial Census

False Pass first appeared on the 1930 U.S. Census as the unincorporated area of "Unimak." This included the populations of both False Pass and Ikatan. It reported again in 1940, but in 1950, was returned separately as False Pass (as an unincorporated village). It was made a census-designated place in 1980.

=== 2020 census ===
As of the 2020 census, False Pass had a population of 397. The median age was 37.3 years. 5.5% of residents were under the age of 18 and 2.3% were 65 years of age or older. For every 100 females there were 297.0 males, and for every 100 females age 18 and over there were 326.1 males age 18 and over.

0.0% of residents lived in urban areas, while 100.0% lived in rural areas.

There were 13 households in False Pass, of which four had children under the age of 18 living in them. Of all households, one was a married-couple household, six were households with a male householder and no spouse or partner present, and two were households with a female householder and no spouse or partner present. About five households were made up of individuals and one household had someone living alone who was 65 years of age or older.

There were 27 housing units, of which 14 were vacant. The homeowner vacancy rate was 0.0% and the rental vacancy rate was 0.0%.

Racial composition as of the 2020 census
Race	Number	Percent
White	184	46.3%
Black or African American	18	4.5%
American Indian and Alaska Native	25	6.3%
Asian	109	27.5%
Native Hawaiian and Other Pacific Islander	5	1.3%
Some other race	28	7.1%
Two or more races	28	7.1%
Hispanic or Latino (of any race)	43	10.8%

=== 2000 Census ===
As of the census of 2000, there were 64 people, 22 households, and 13 families residing in the city. The population density was 2.4 inhabitants per square mile (0.93/km^{2}). There were 40 housing units at an average density of 1.5 units per square mile (0.58 units/km^{2}). The racial makeup of the city was 62.50% Native American, 26.56% White, 1.56% from other races, and 9.38% from two or more races. 1.56% of the population were Hispanic or Latino of any race.

There were 22 households, out of which 31.8% had children under the age of 18 living with them, 22.7% were married couples living together, 18.2% had a female householder with no husband present, and 36.4% were non-families. 31.8% of all households were made up of individuals, and 9.1% had someone living alone who was 65 years of age or older. The average household size was 2.91 and the average family size was 3.79.

In the city, the age distribution of the population shows 35.9% under the age of 18, 9.4% from 18 to 24, 18.8% from 25 to 44, 31.3% from 45 to 64, and 4.7% who were 65 years of age or older. The median age was 32 years. For every 100 females, there were 100.0 males. For every 100 females age 18 and over, there were 115.8 males.

The median income for a household in the city was $49,375, and the median income for a family was $70,625. Males had a median income of $23,750 versus $37,083 for females. The per capita income for the city was $21,465. There were 11.1% of families and 8.0% of the population living below the poverty line, including no under eighteens and 50.0% of those over 64.

Occupation categories for the 2000 census are shown in the accompanying pie chart.

2000 Census: Occupations

The community has traditionally depended upon commercial fishing, but it now employs only 24% of the workforce or 10 individuals. These individuals are boat captains and crewmen. As in many modern American communities, white collar sales/office and management positions now employ 51% of the employment positions or 21 people.

== Education ==
Aleutians East Borough School District (AEBSD) operates the False Pass School.

c. 1978 the school, then a part of the Aleutian Region School District, had a single teacher, and 8 students.

== Picture gallery ==
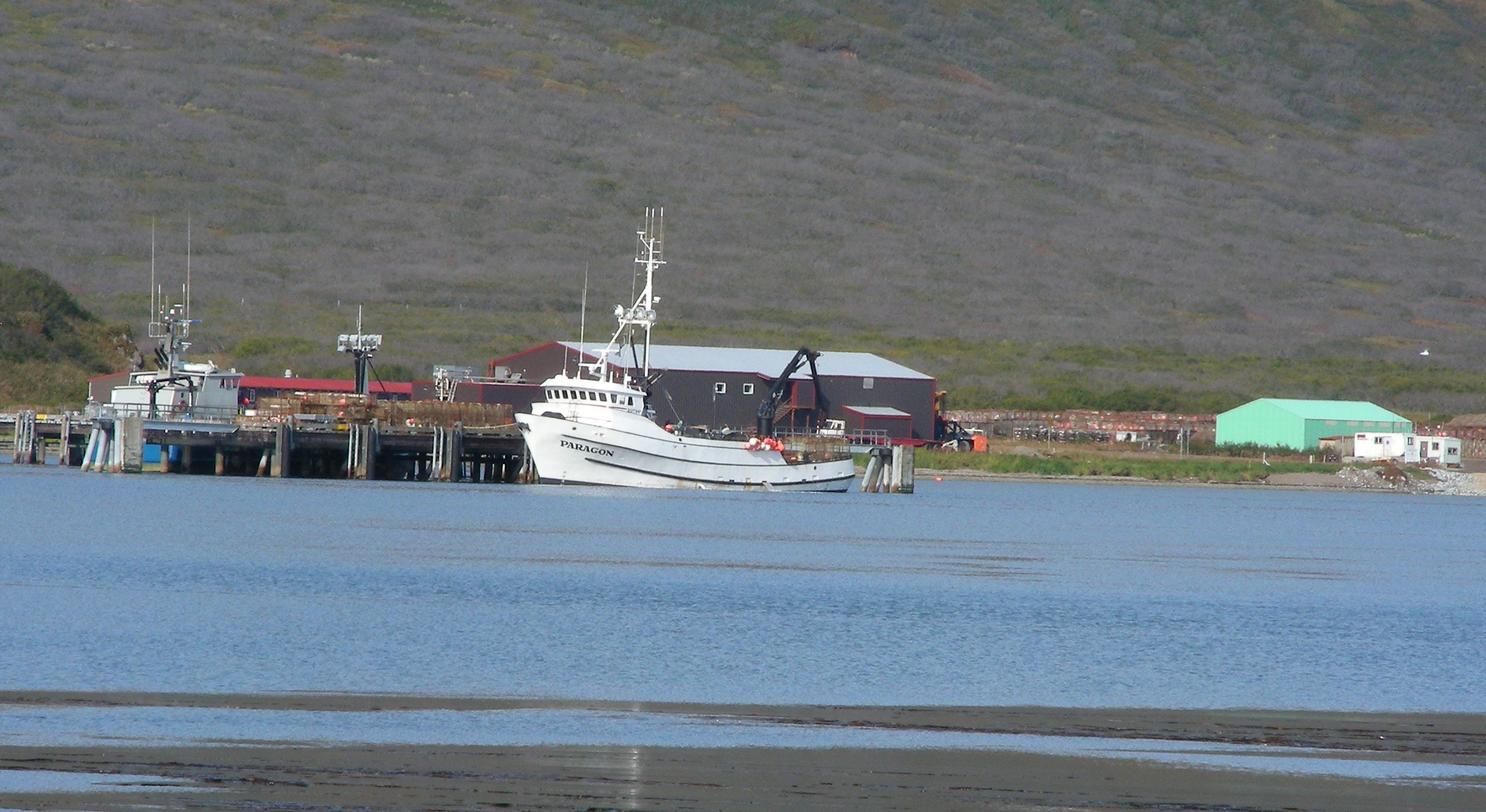
Crab boats loading pots in False Pass, AK.

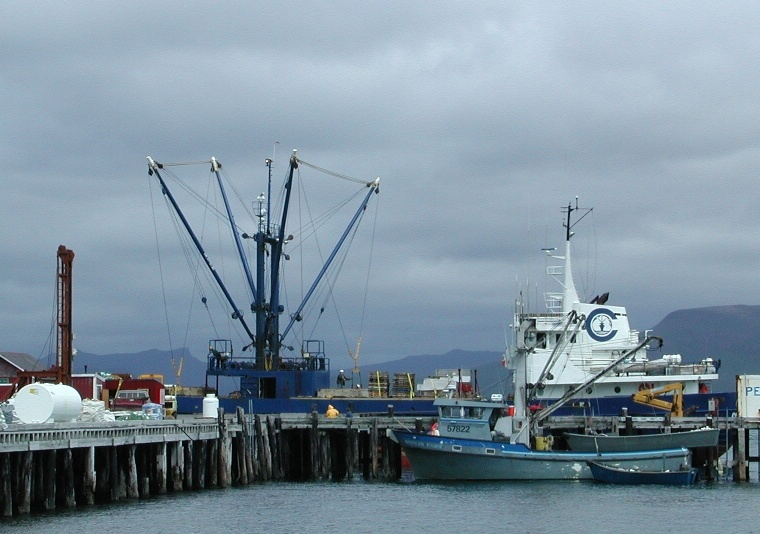
Local salmon seiner, False Pass, AK.

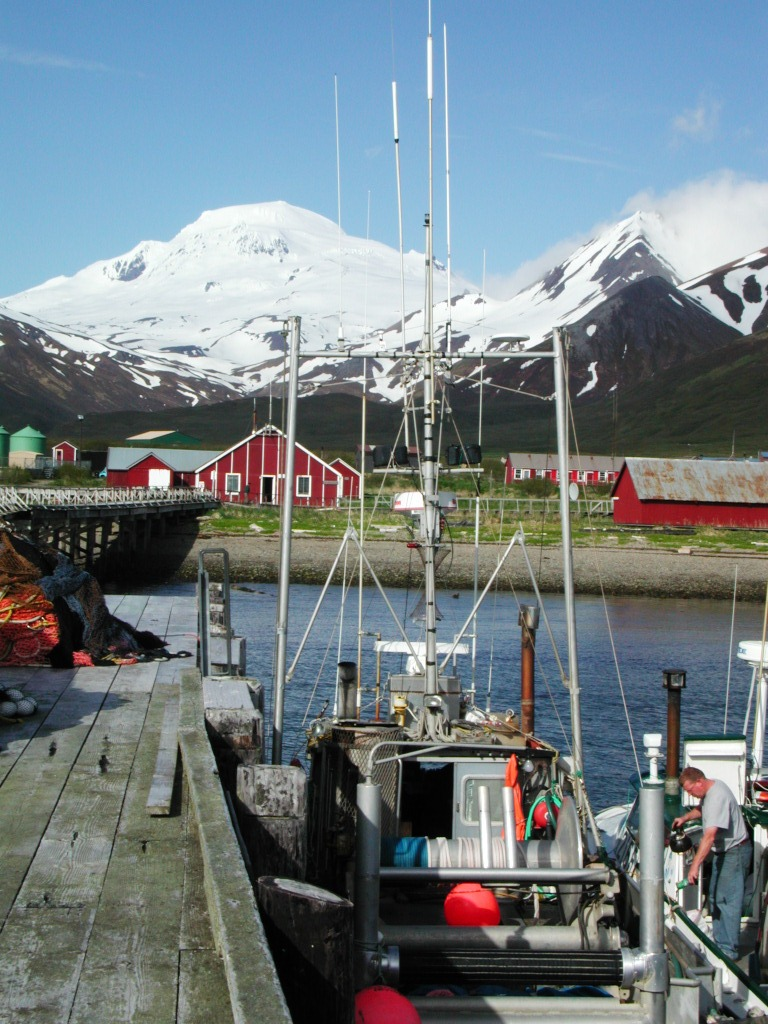
Gillnetters at Peter Pan dock, False Pass, AK.

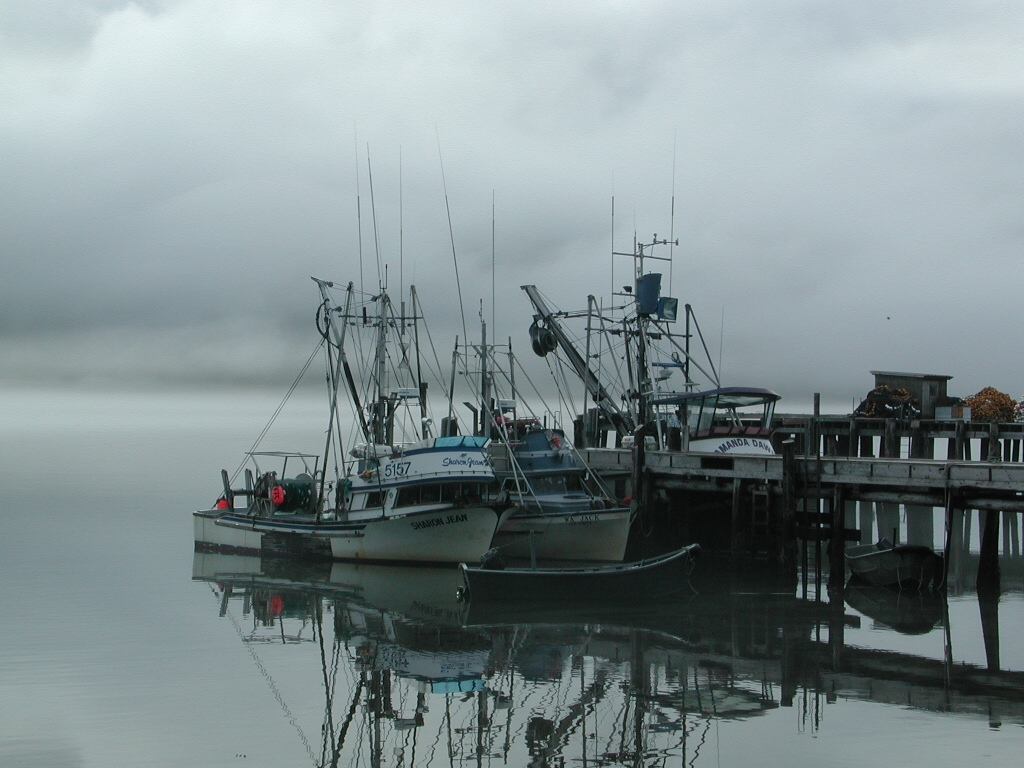
Salmon boats at dock in False Pass, AK.

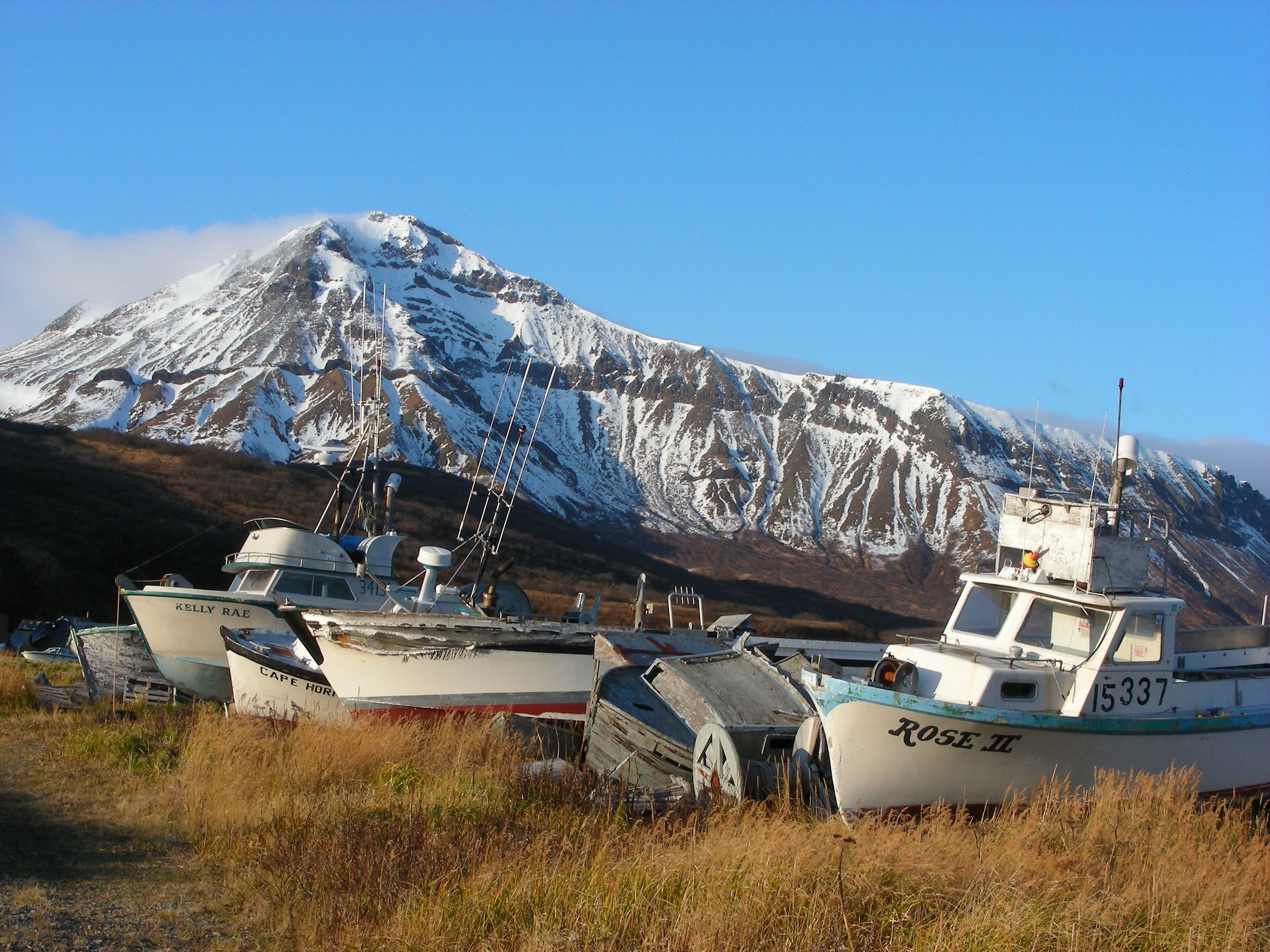
Salmon boats hauled up in False Pass, AK.

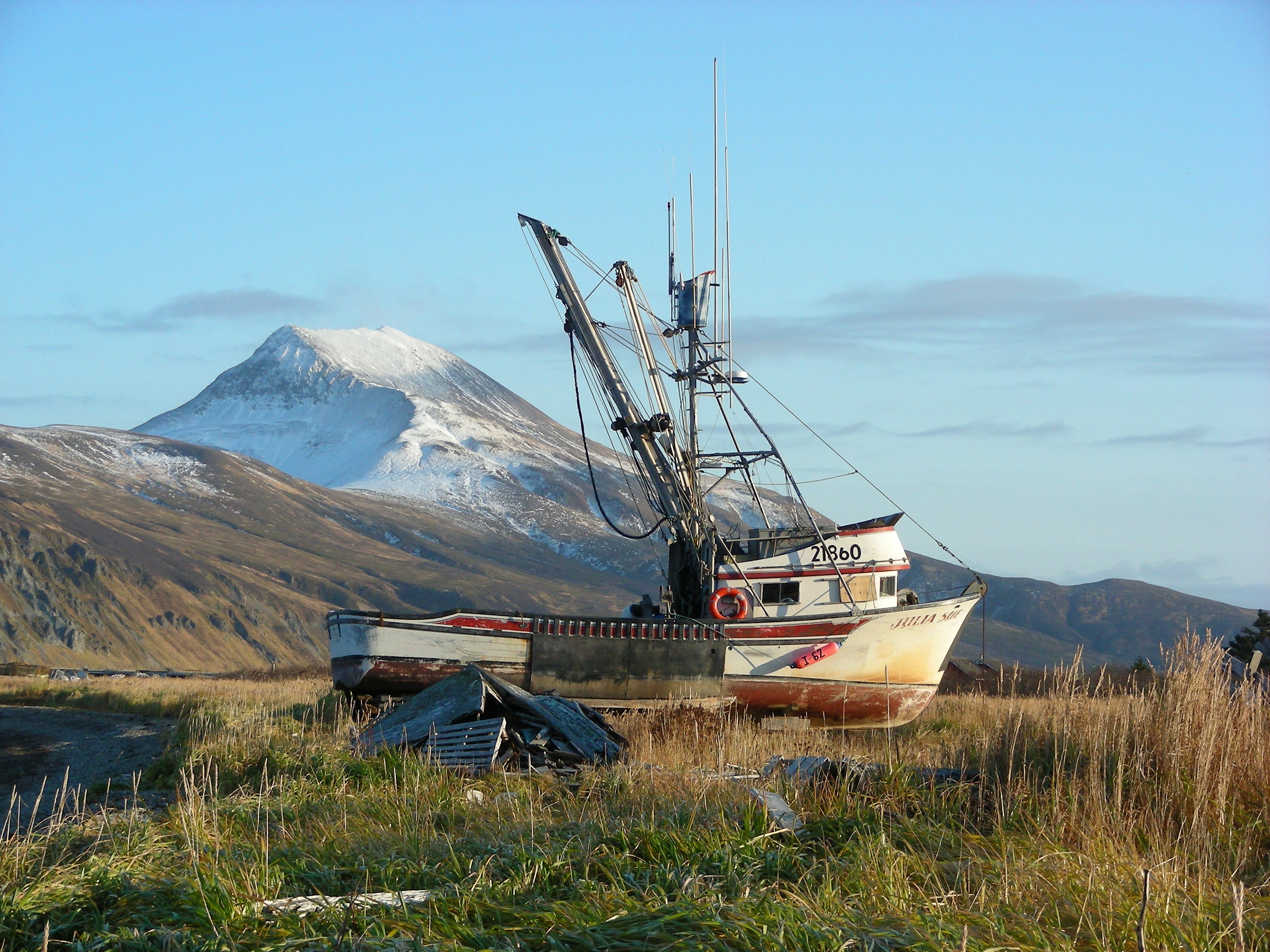
Local salmon seiner "up for the winter".

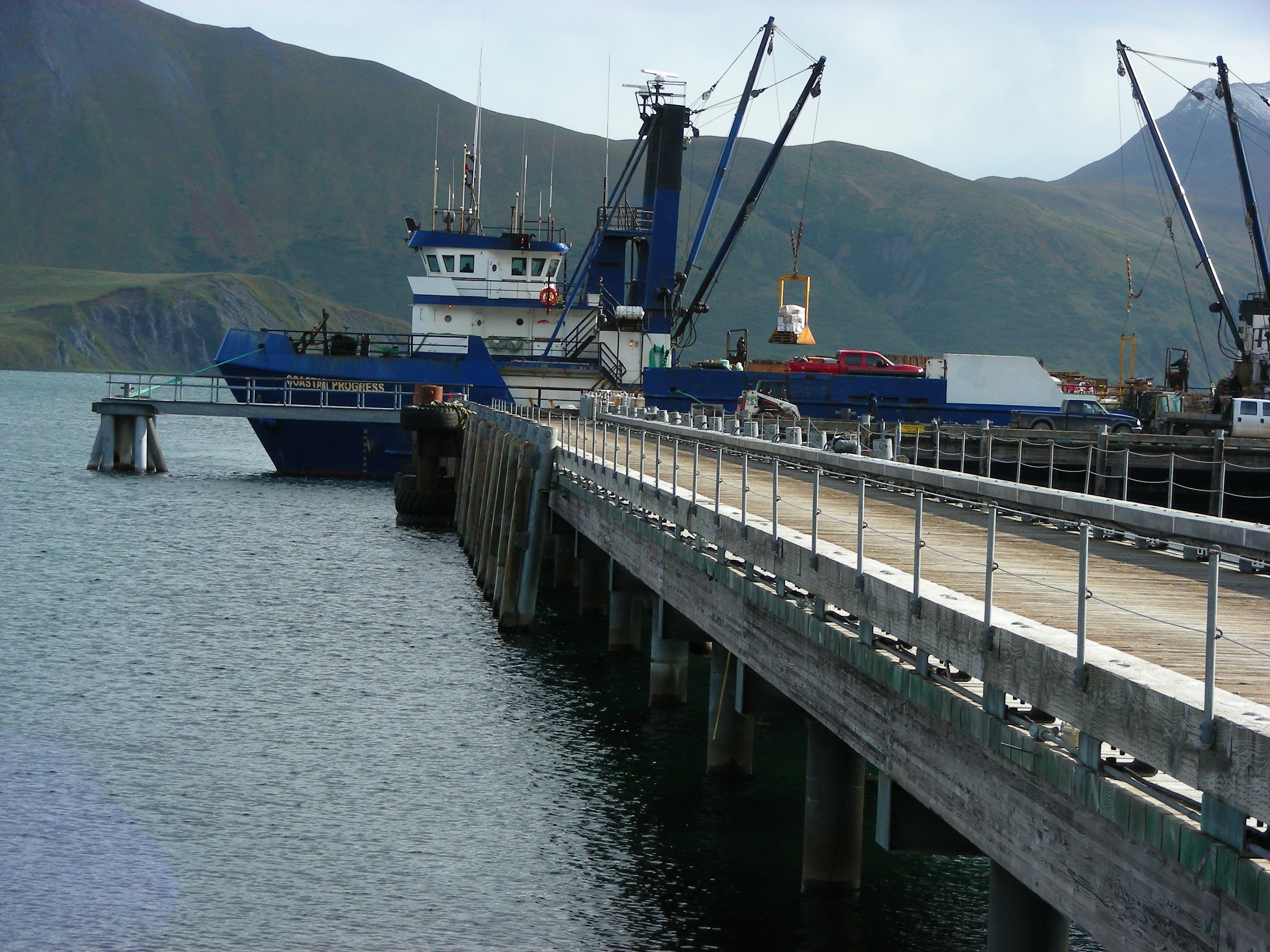
Seattle freighter arrives twice a month at False Pass.

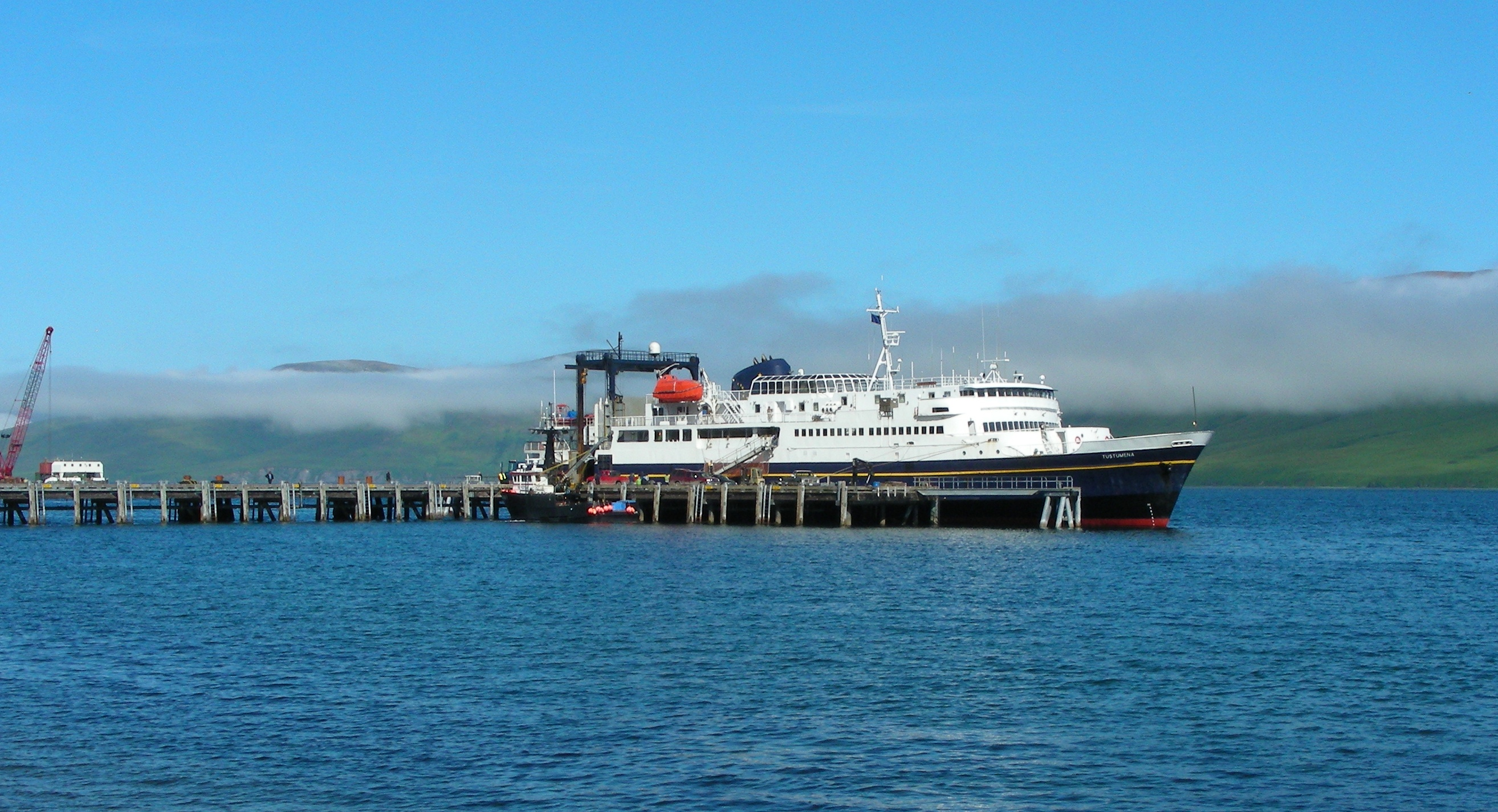
Alaska Ferry Tustamena arrives monthly in False Pass.

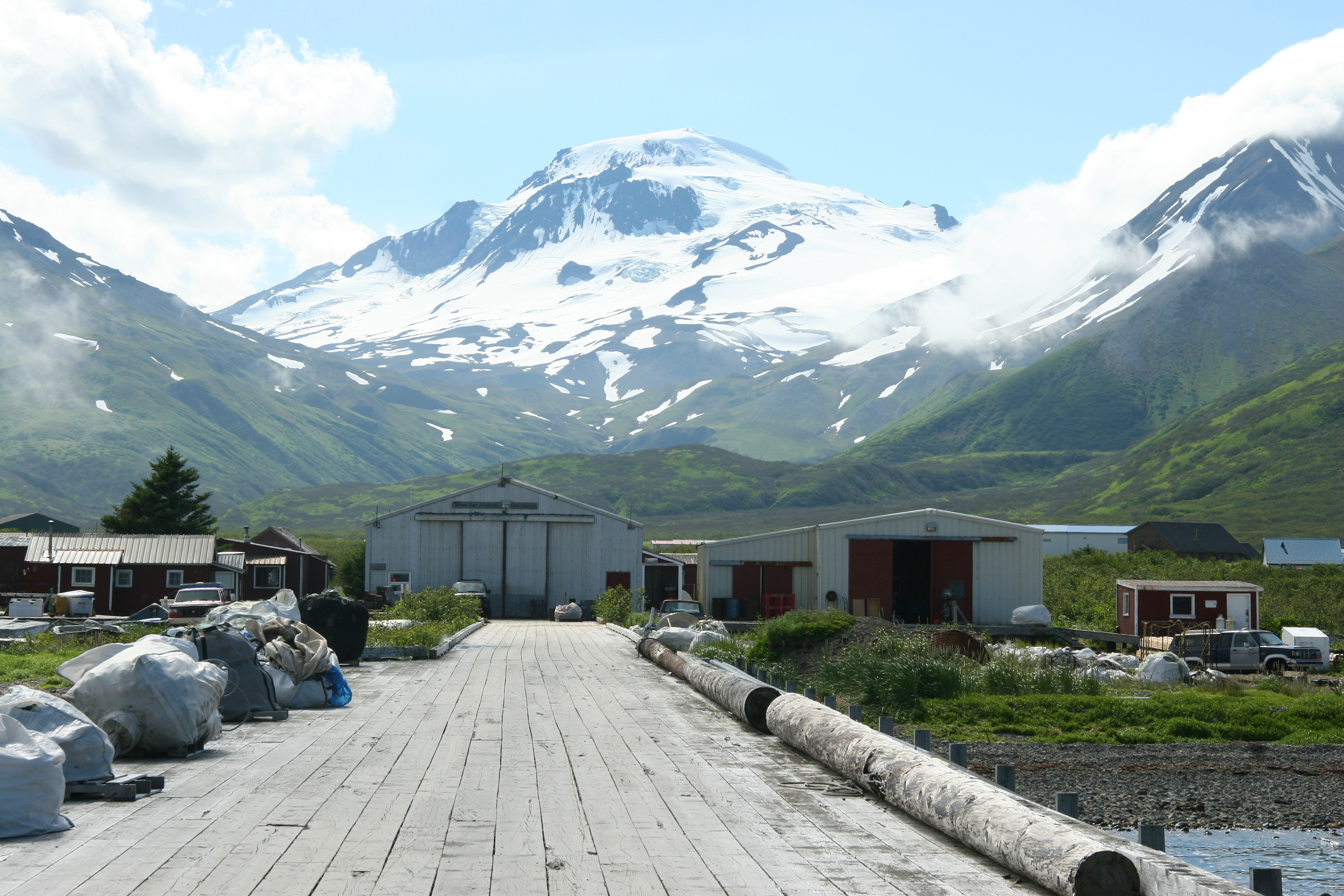
Peter Pan dock, looking west, False Pass.

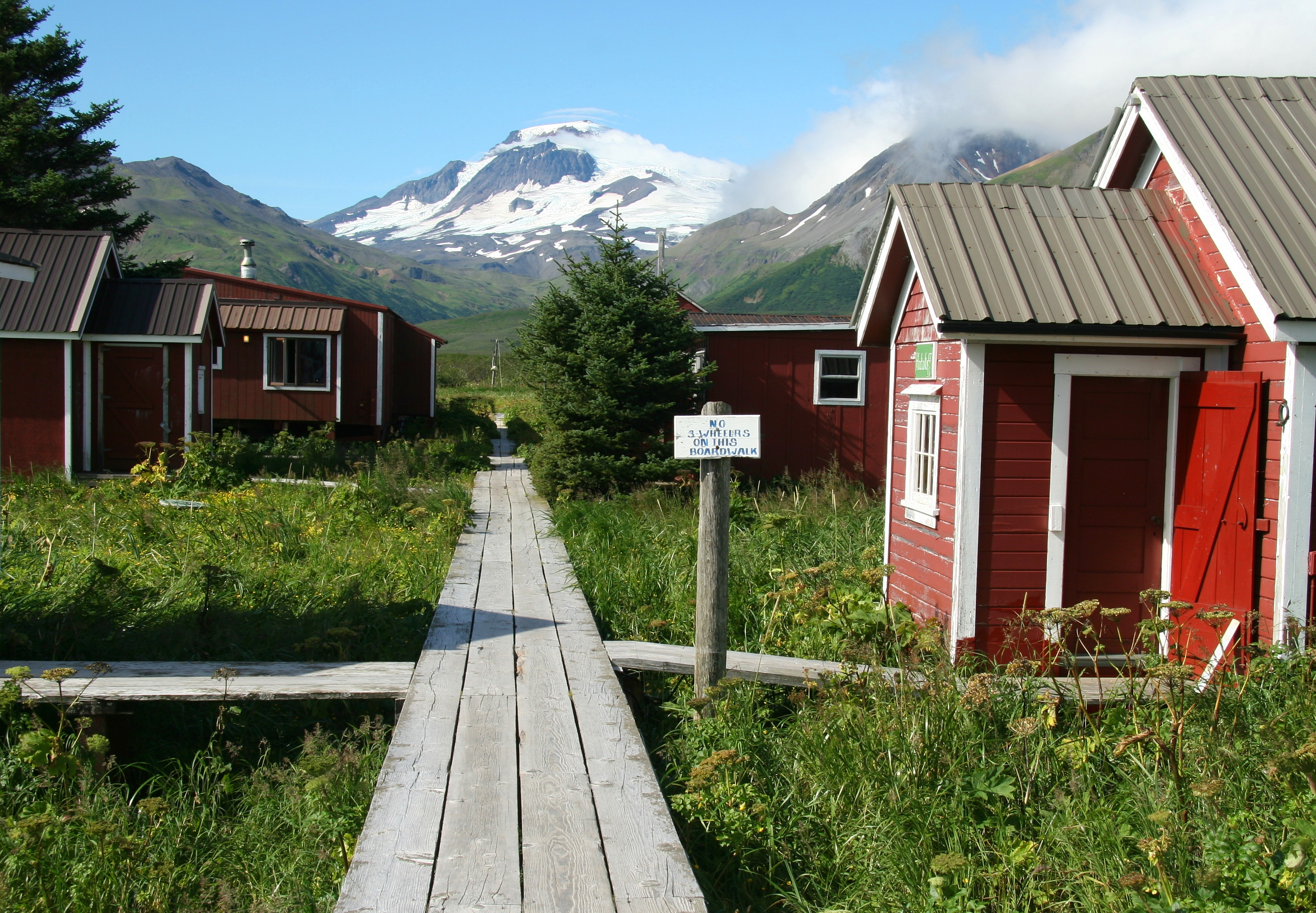
Old cannery board walks, False Pass.

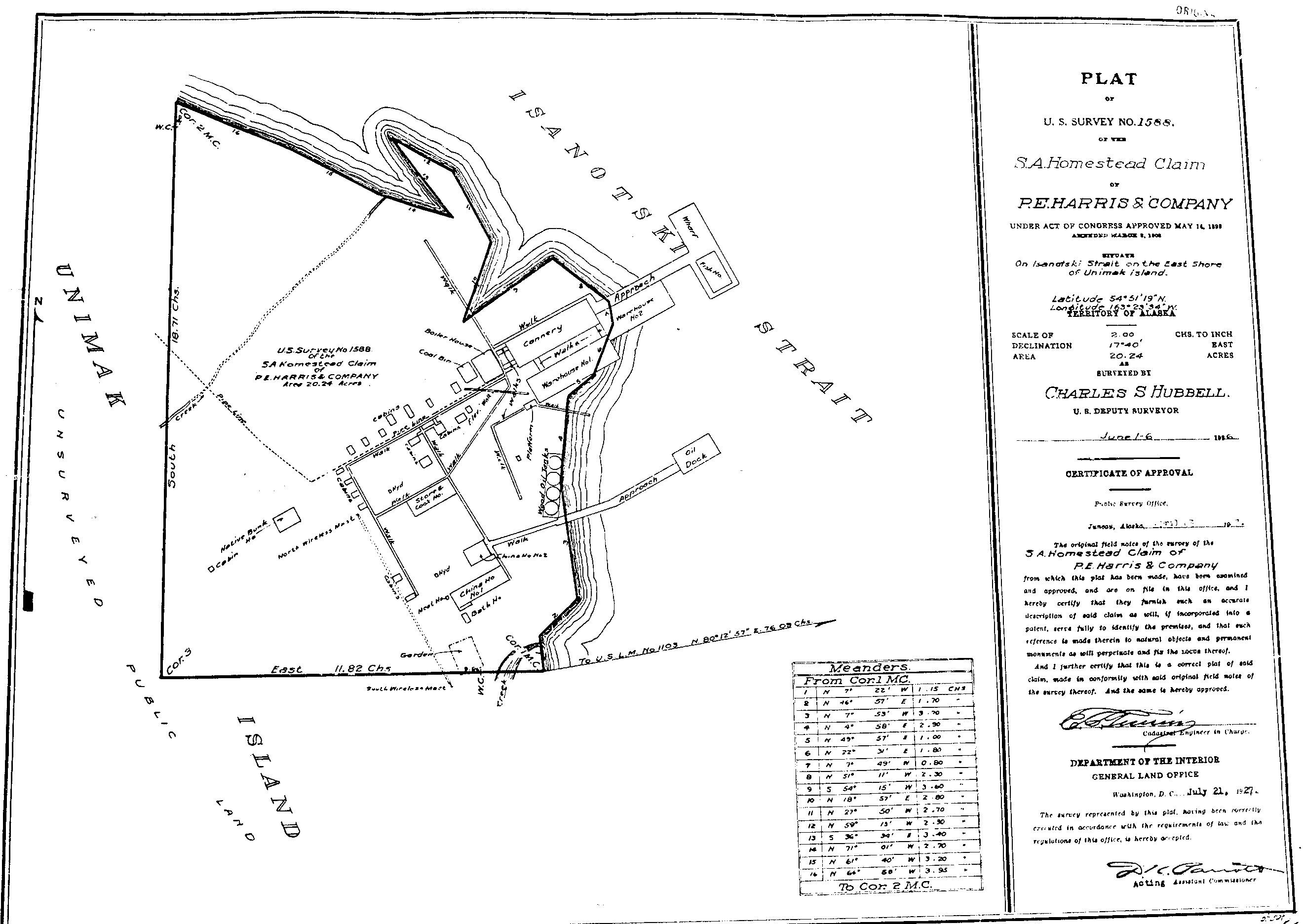
Original plat for cannery, False Pass.

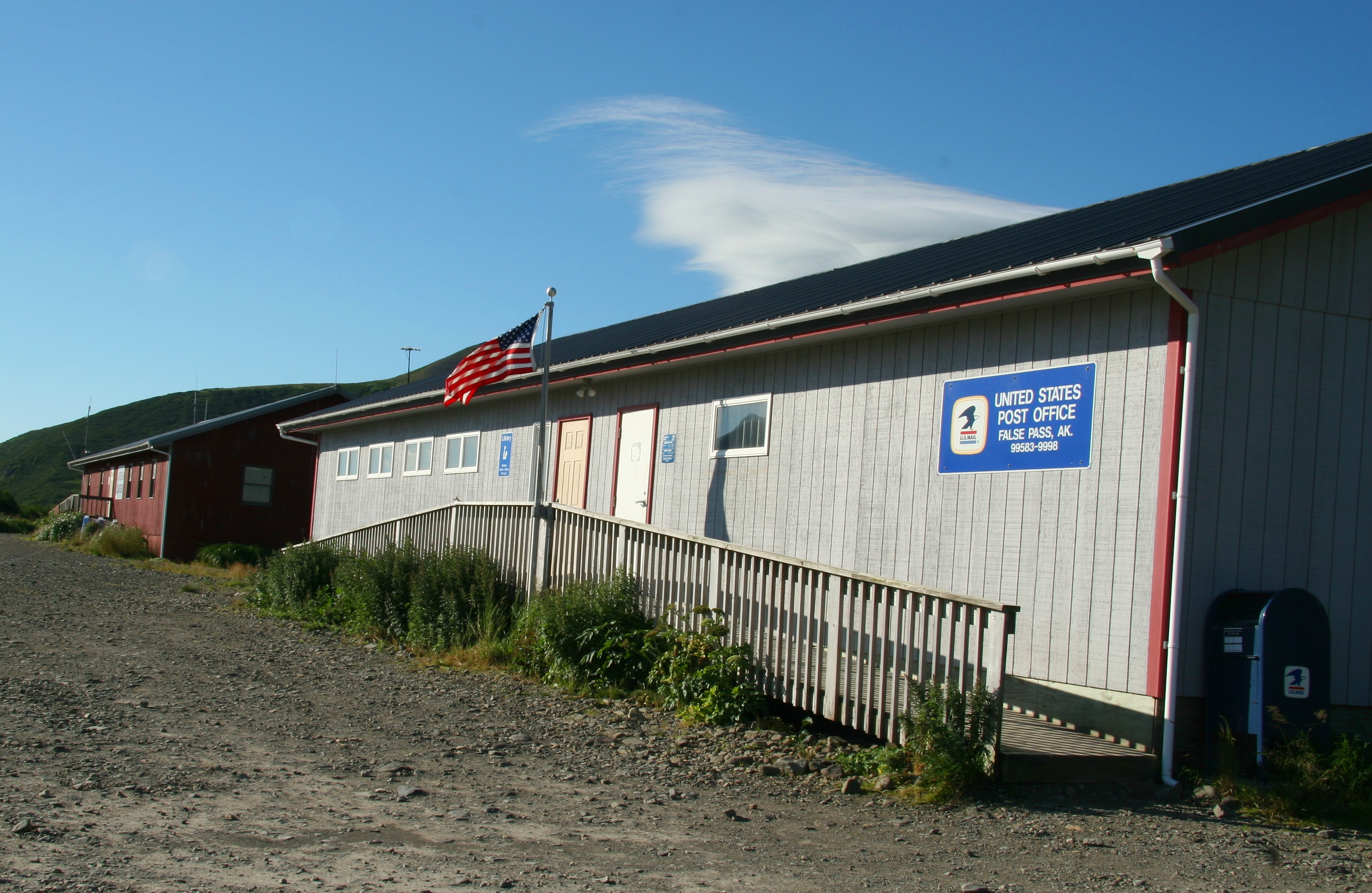
False Pass P.O., library, City Offices.

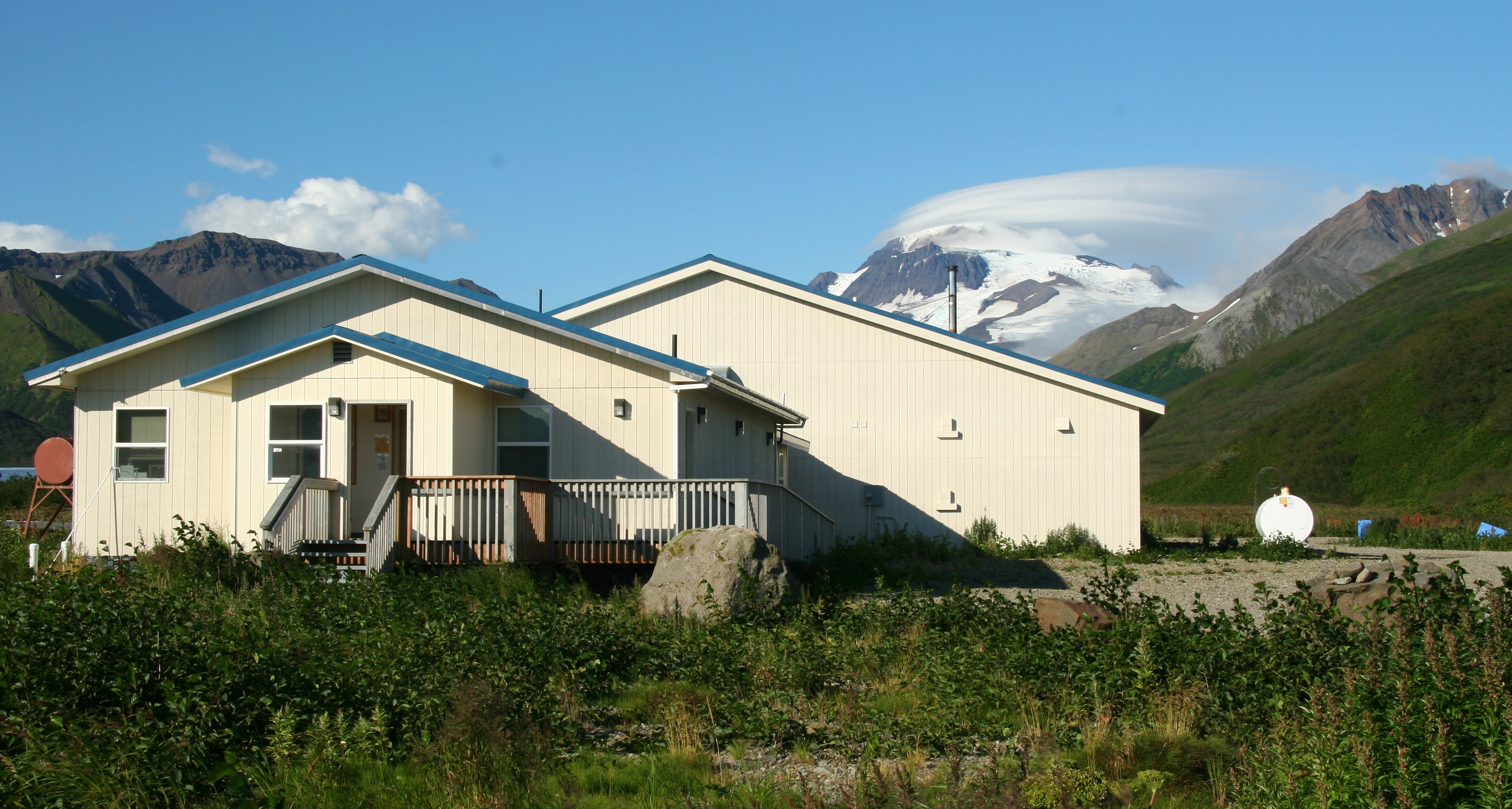
False Pass Medical Clinic.

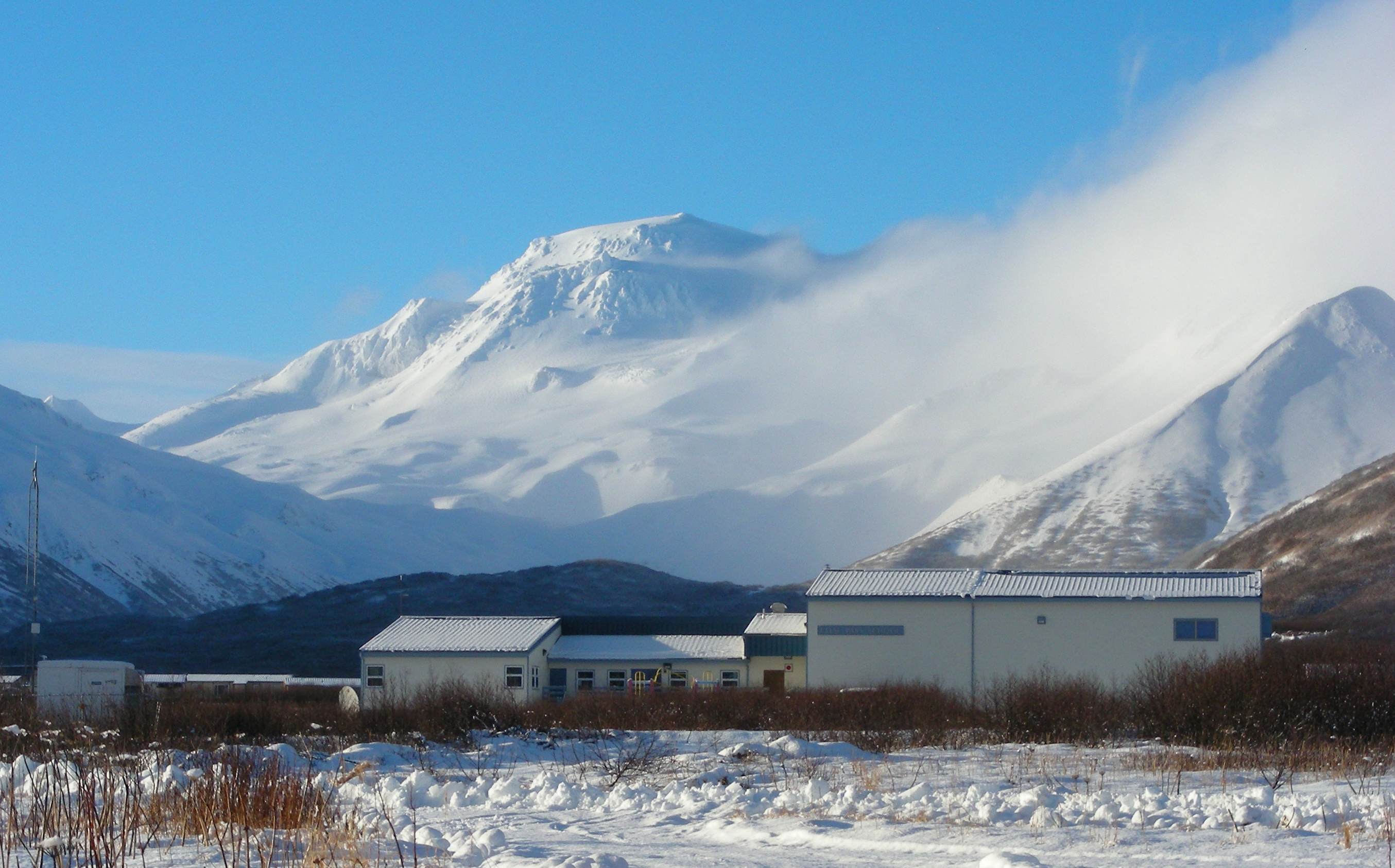
False Pass School and Roundtop volcano.

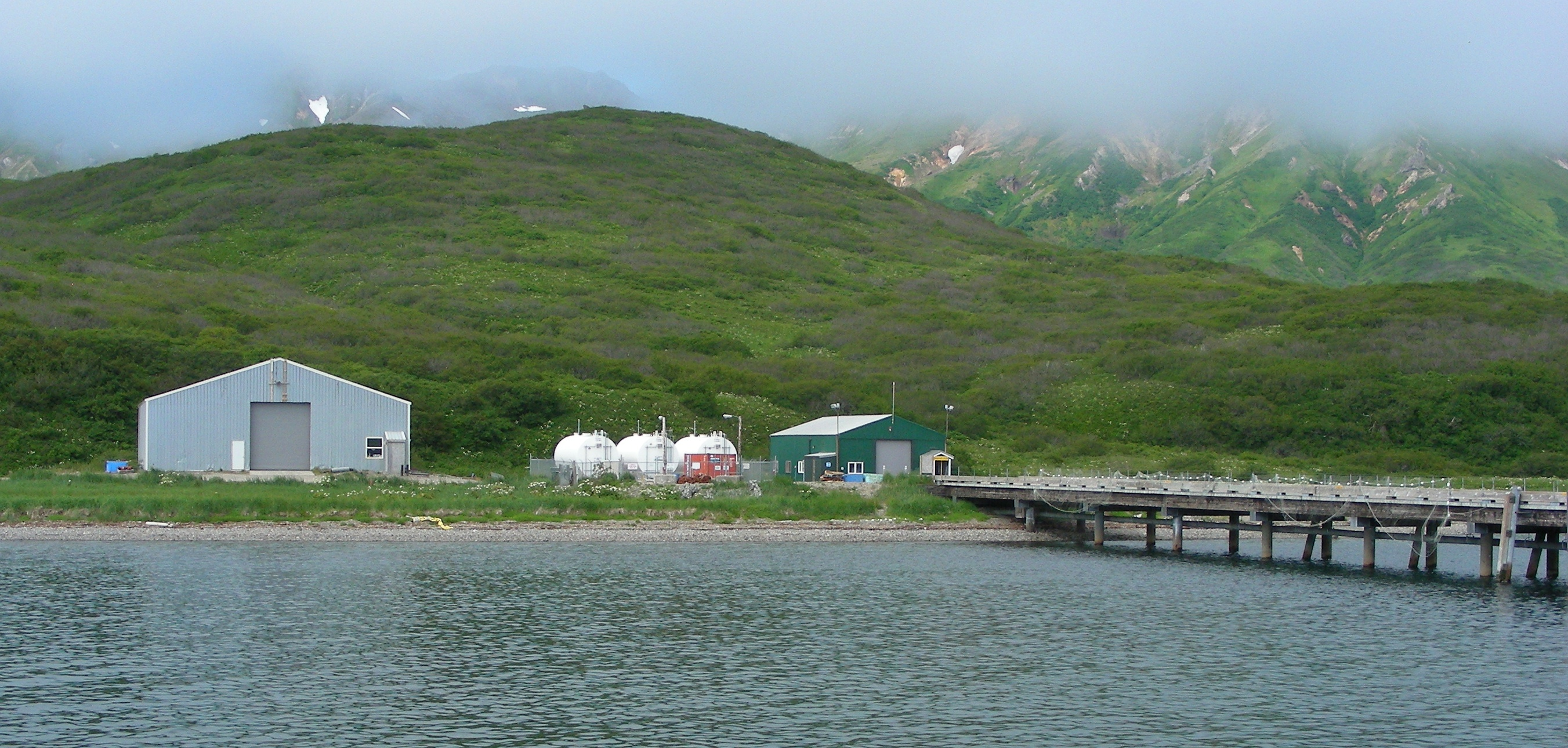
False Pass grocery store & city dock.

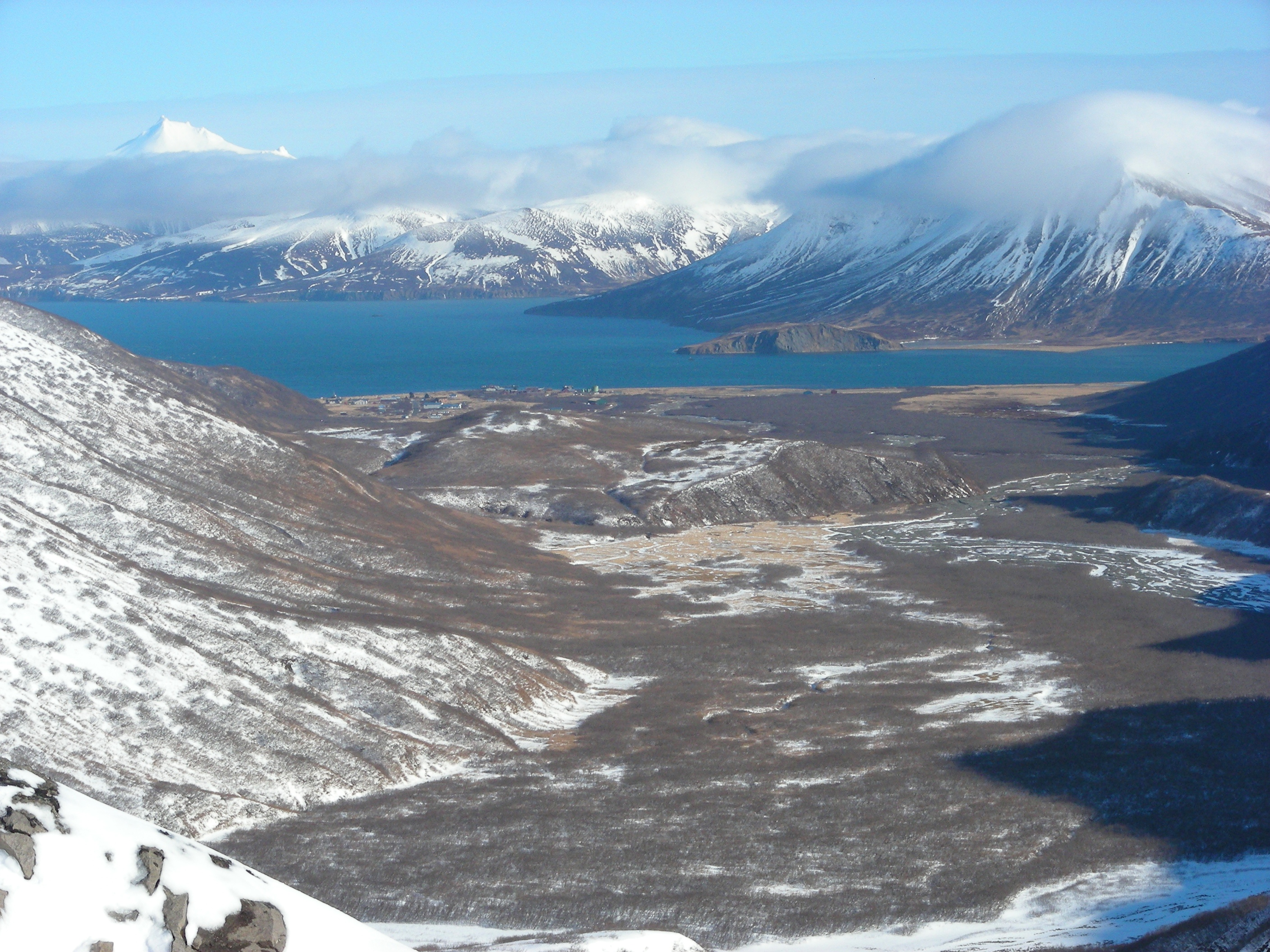
View east down Roundtop Valley, False Pass.

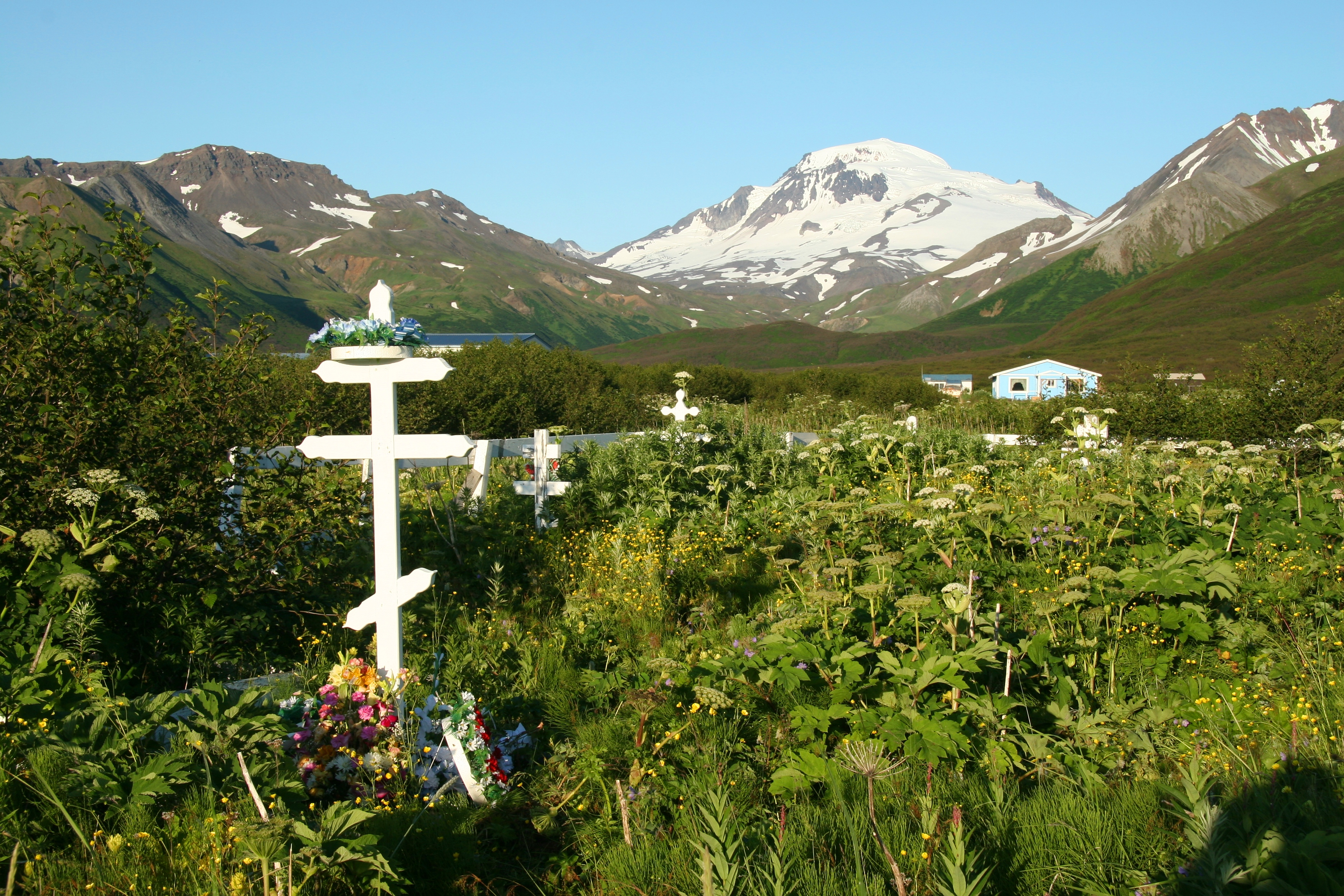
Cemetery in False Pass, Alaska.
