= Unimak Island =

Island in Alaska, United States

Unimak
Native name: Unimax
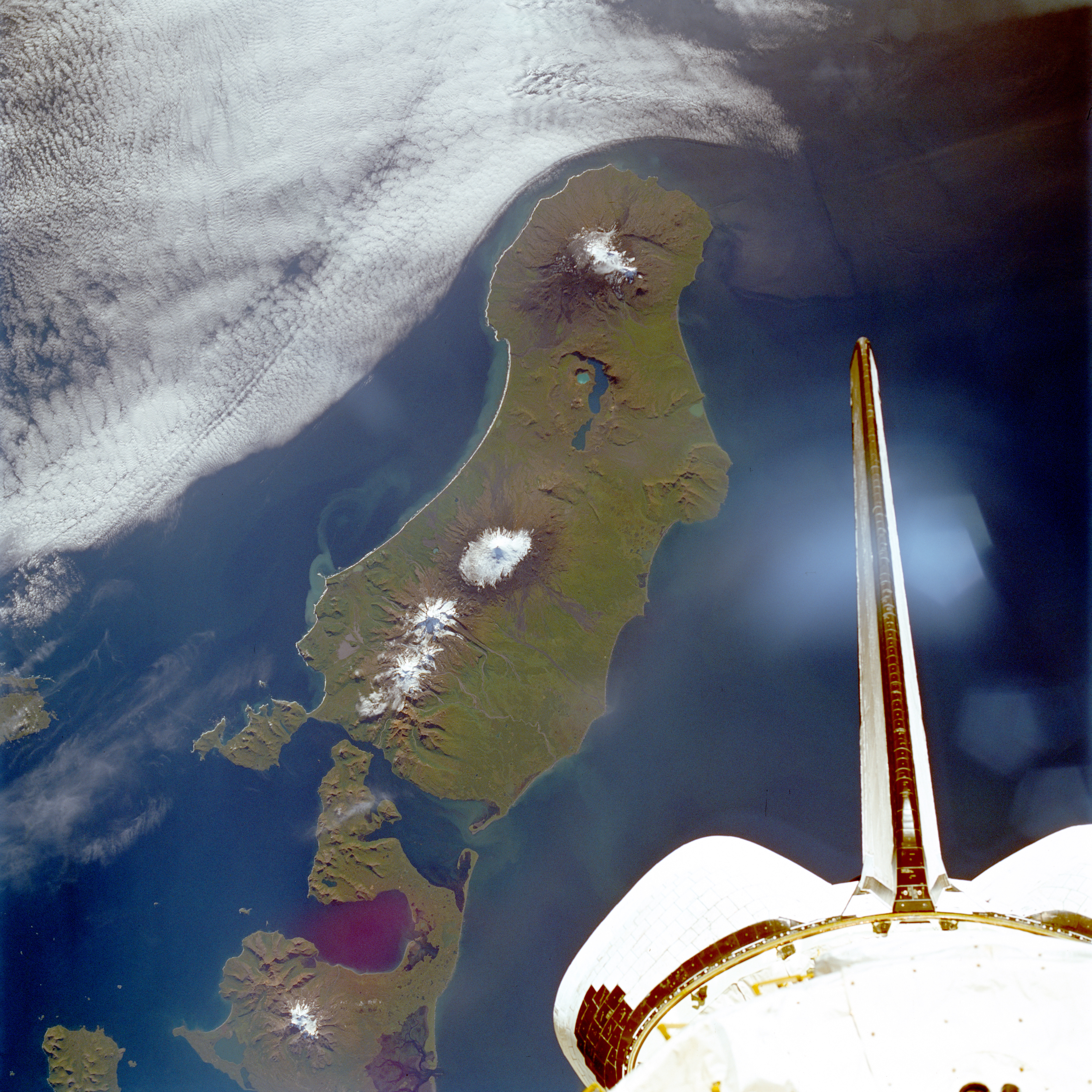
- Unimak Island from space, September 1992 (viewed from Shuttle Endeavour on STS-47)

- Location within Alaska

Geography
- Location: Northern Pacific Ocean
- Coordinates: 54°46′06″N 164°11′12″W
- Archipelago: Aleutian Islands
- Area: 1,571.41 sq mi (4,069.9 km^{2})
- Length: 95 km (59 mi)
- Width: 116 km (72.1 mi)
- Highest elevation: 9,373 ft (2856.9 m)
- Highest point: Mount Shishaldin

Administration
- United States
- State: Alaska
- Borough: Aleutians East

Demographics
- Population: 35 (2010)
- Pop. density: 0.02/km^{2} (0.05/sq mi)

Unimak Island (Aleut: Unimax; Russian: Унимак) is the largest island in the Aleutian Islands chain of the U.S. state of Alaska.

== Geography ==
It is the easternmost island in the Aleutians and, with an area of 1,571.41 square miles (4,069.93 square kilometers), the 9th largest island in the United States and the 134th largest island in the world. It is home to Mount Shishaldin, one of the ten most active volcanoes in the world. According to the United States Census Bureau, 64 people were living on Unimak as of the 2000 census, all of them in the city of False Pass at the eastern end of the island. Cape Lutke is a headland on the island. Cape Pankof is located at the extreme southwest of the island.

The Fisher Caldera is a volcanic crater in the west-central part of Unimak. Some characteristics include many volcanic cones and undrained lakes. It is named for Bernard Fisher, a U.S. Geological Survey geologist who was killed in Umnak Pass.

Mount Westdahl, 5,426 feet (1,654 m) in elevation, is a stratovolcano of the Aleutian Range on the island situated at its western end.

== Natural history ==
When the Alaska National Interest Lands Conservation Act was passed on 2 December 1980, 910,000 acres (370,000 ha) of the island was designated as wilderness. This area is managed by the United States Fish and Wildlife Service as part of the Alaska Maritime National Wildlife Refuge.

As a faunal extension of the Alaska Peninsula, Unimak has a relatively diverse assemblage of terrestrial mammals, including Alaska Peninsula brown bears and barren-ground caribou. West of Unimak Island, the largest native mammal in the Aleutians is the red fox.

== Buildings ==
Scotch Cap Lighthouse was built in 1903 and was staffed by the US Coast Guard. On April 1, 1946, during the 1946 Aleutian Islands earthquake, the lighthouse was struck by a tsunami. Even though the lighthouse was 98 feet (30 m) above the sea, the lighthouse slid into the sea, killing five Coast Guard personnel.

The Cape Sarichef Lighthouse and the Cape Sarichef Airport are also located on the island.

== Gallery ==
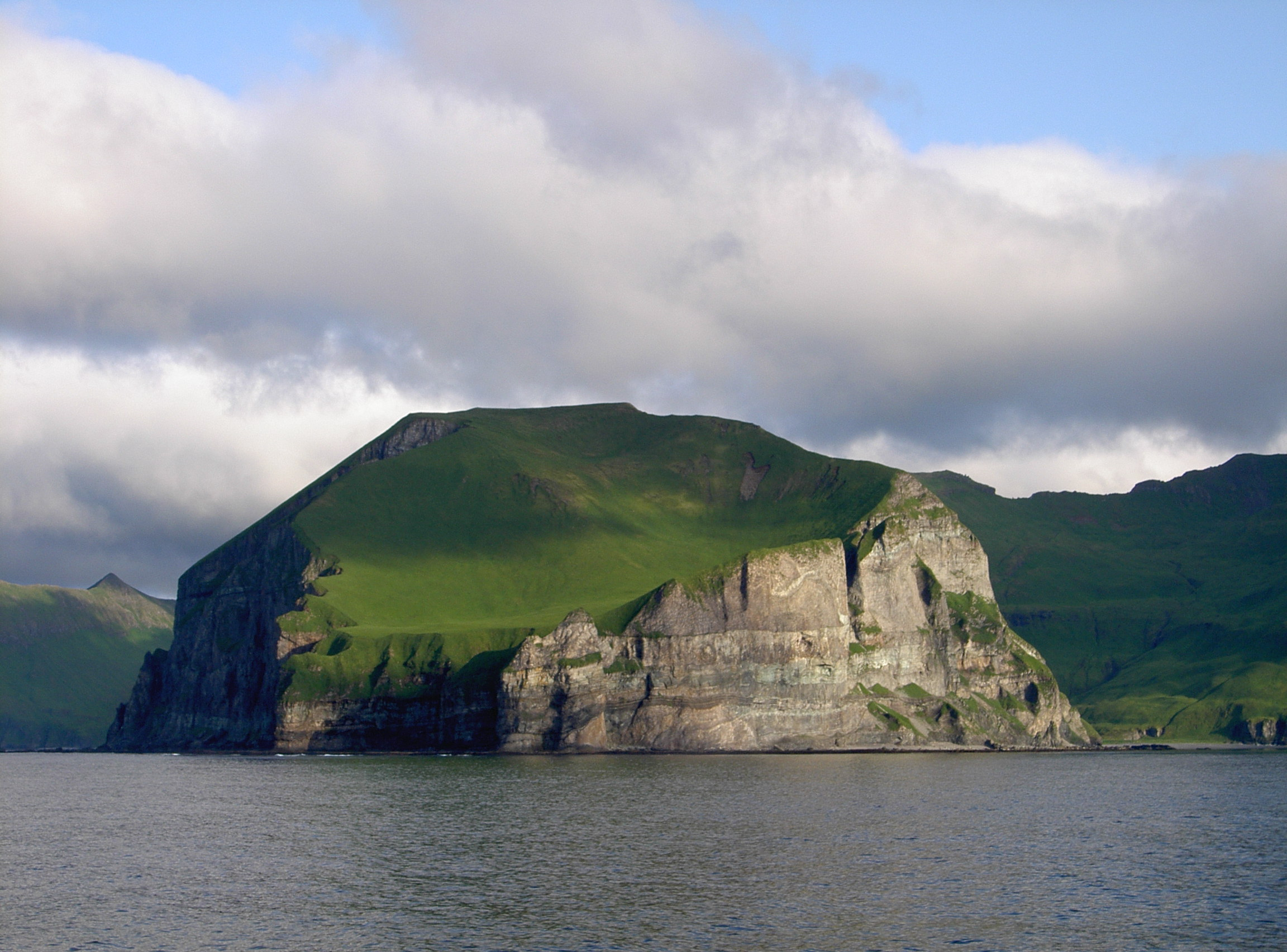
Cape Lutkes headland

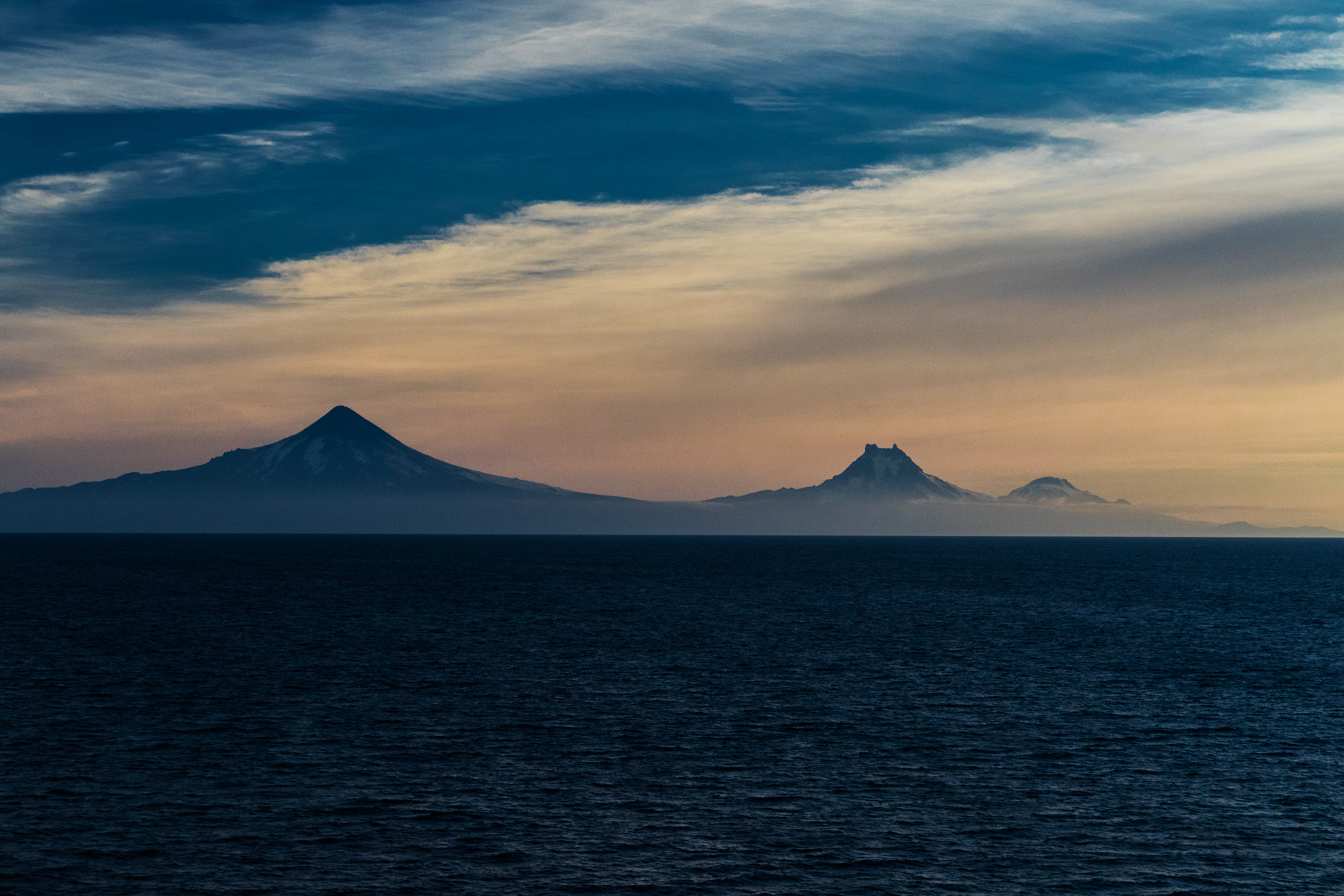
Shishaldin, Isanotski and Roundtop volcanoes as seen from the Unimak Pass in morning light.

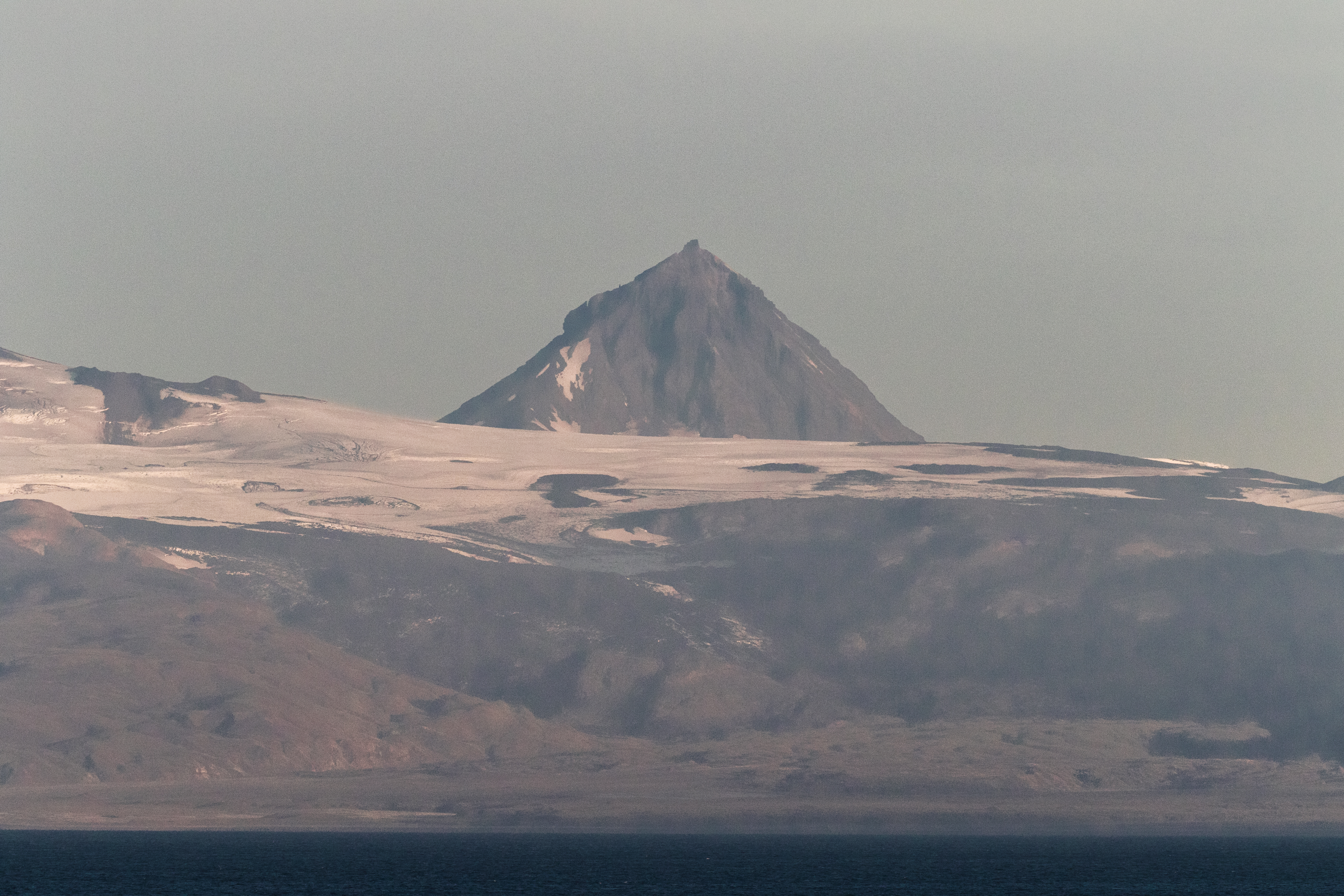
Pogramni (6,569 ft; 2,002 m) volcano as seen from the Unimak Pass in the morning light.

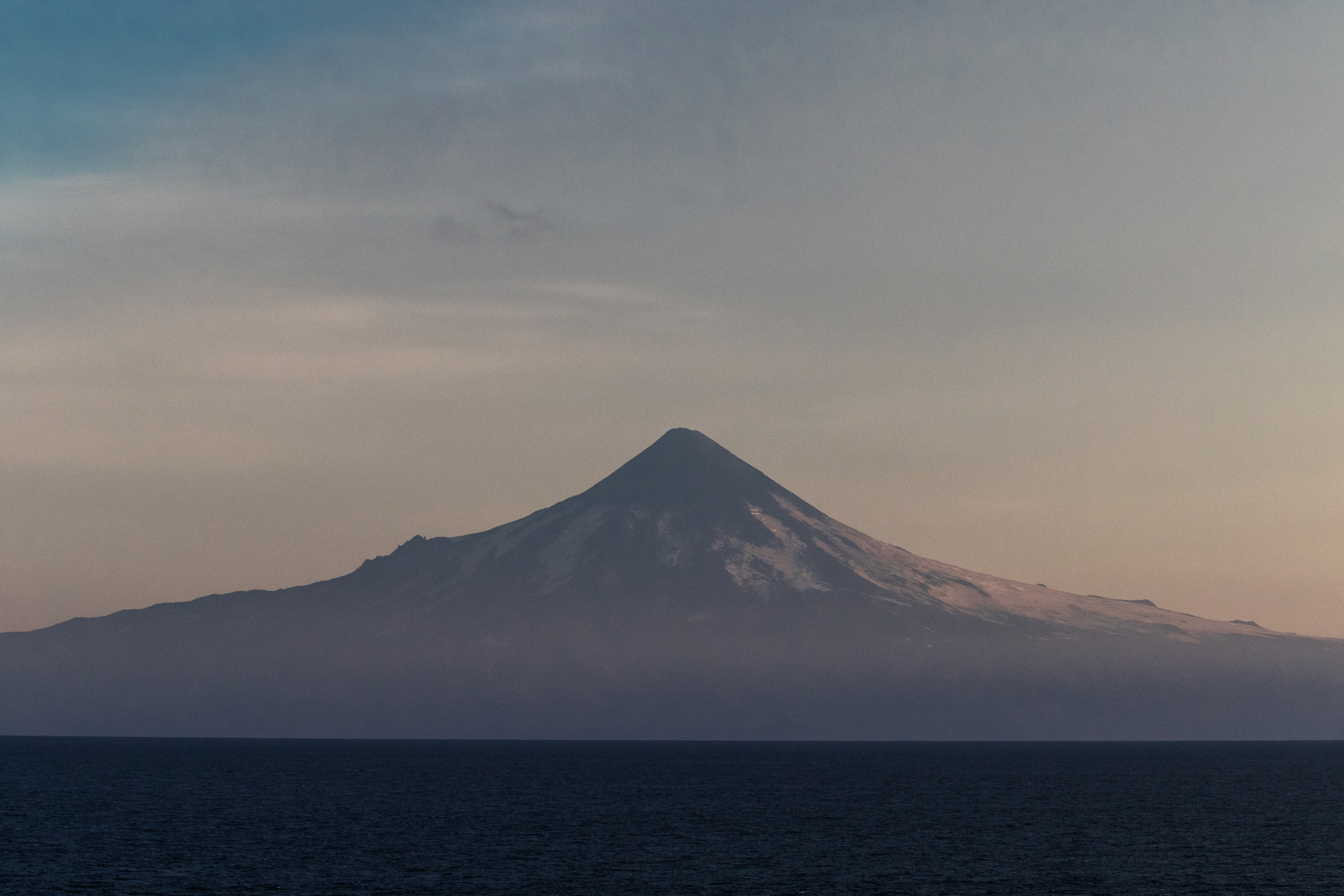
Shishaldin (9,373 ft; 2,857 m) volcano as seen from the Unimak Pass in the morning light.

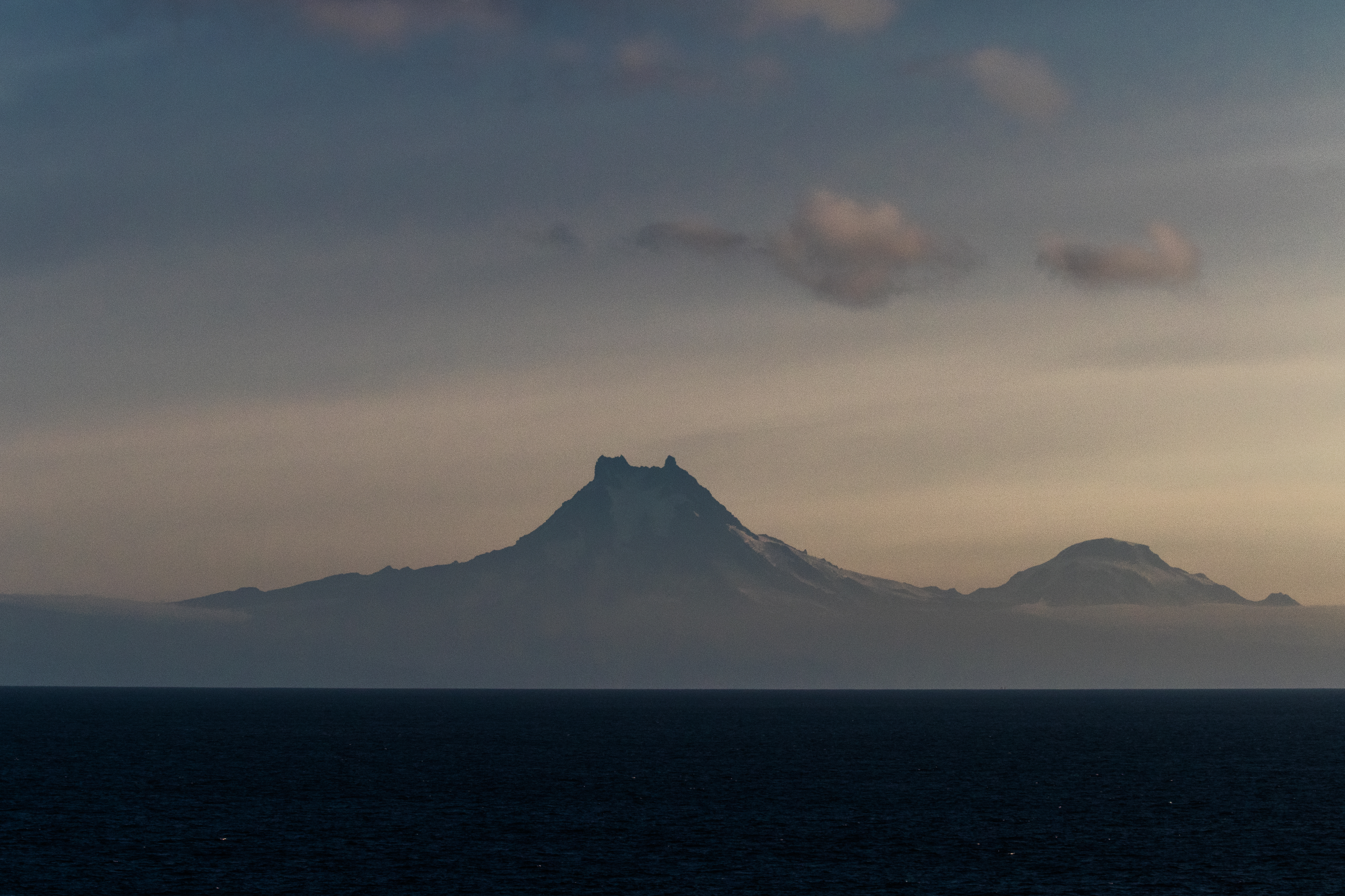
Isanotski (8,104 ft; 2,470 m) and Roundtop (6,128 ft; 1,868 m) volcanoes as seen from the Unimak Pass in the morning light.

== See also ==
- Islands of Aleutians East Borough, Alaska
- Extreme points of the United States
