= 2026 United States Senate election in Alaska =

- November 3, 2026
- Turnout: 48.0% ▼12.7 pp
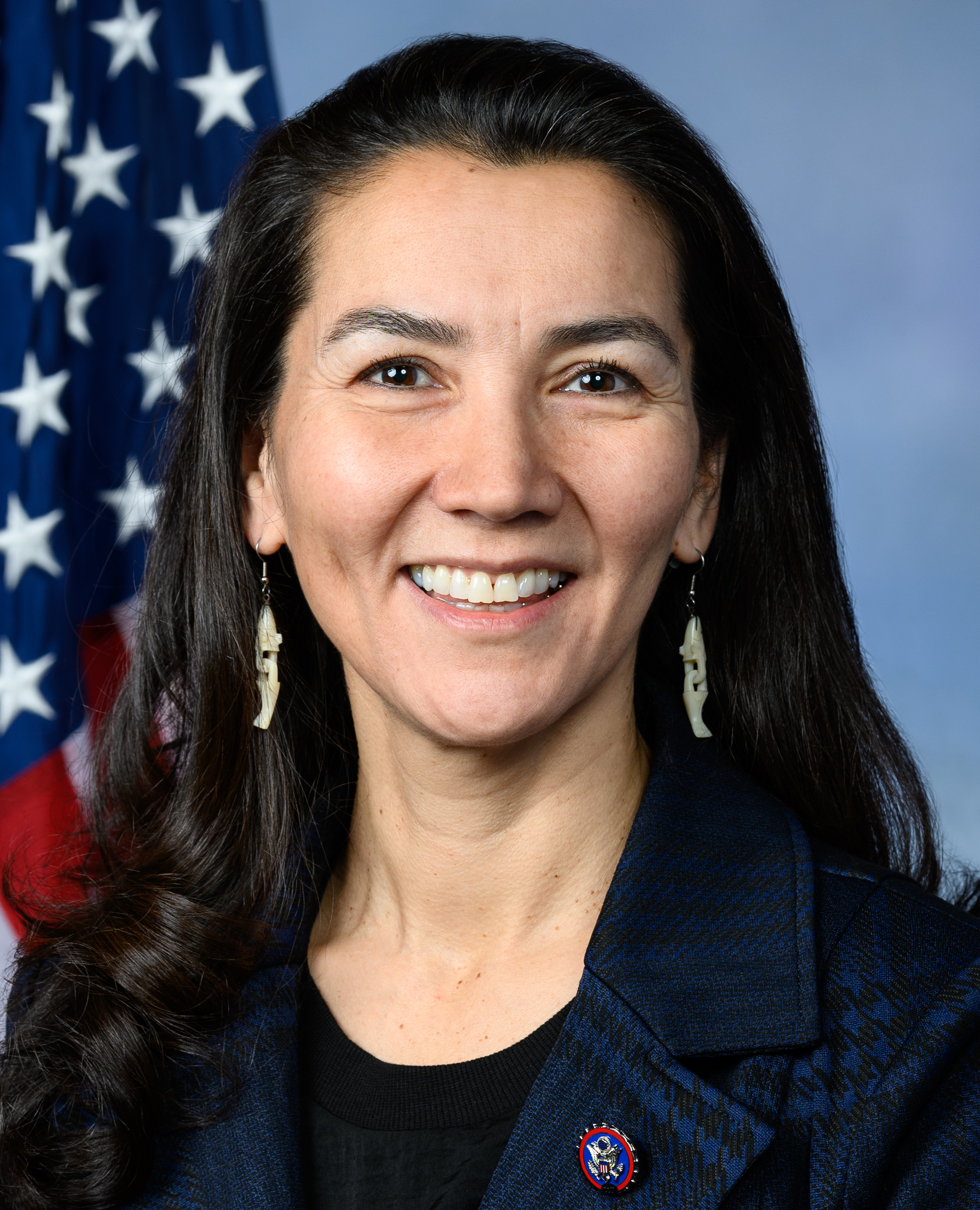

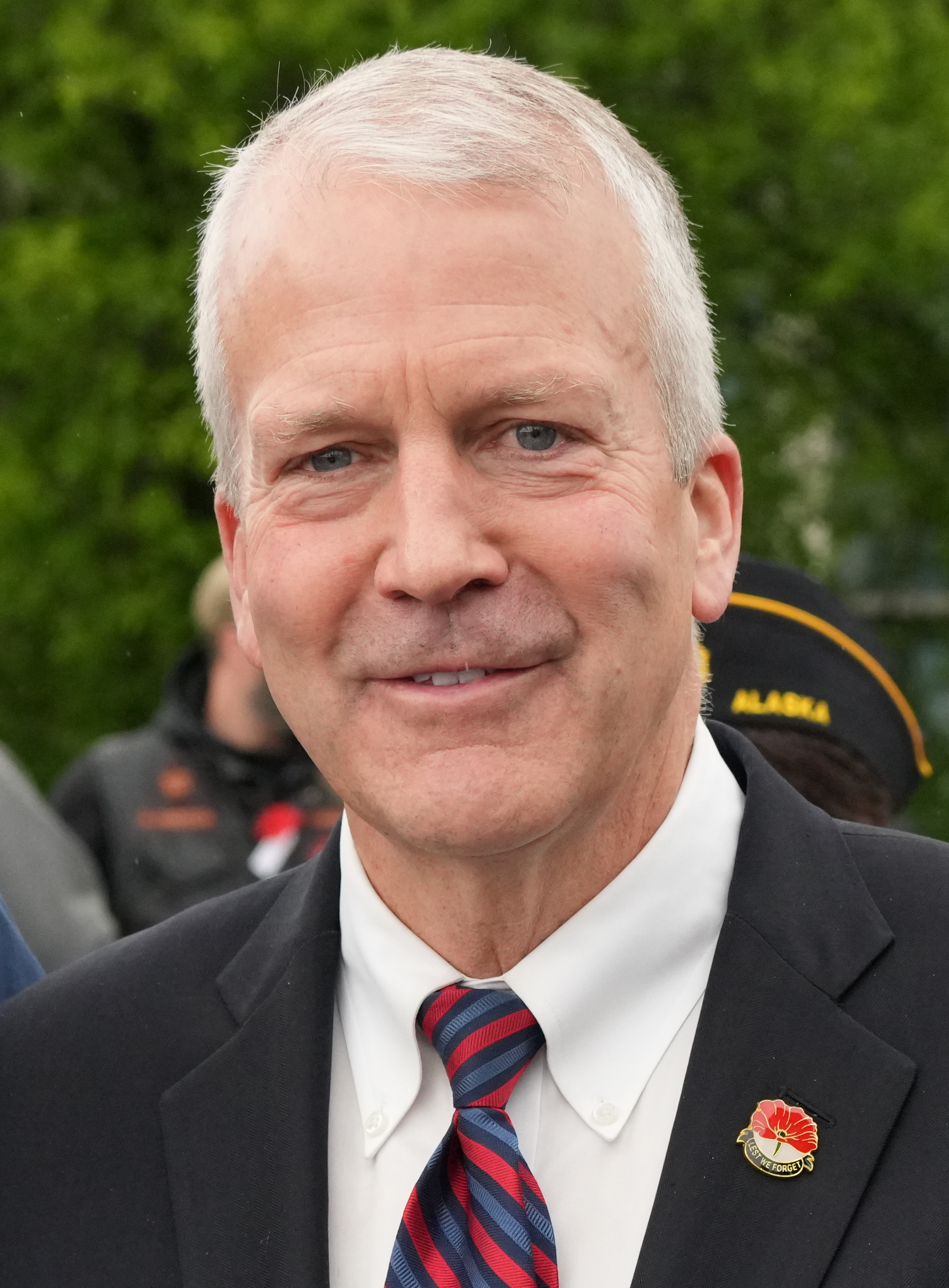
Candidate	Mary Peltola	Dan S. Sullivan
Party	Democratic	Republican
Popular vote	144,486	131,965
Percentage	50.13%	45.79%
- Peltola: 40–50% 50–60% 60–70% 70–80% 80–90% D. S. Sullivan: 40–50% 50–60% 60–70% 70–80%
U.S. senator before election
Dan S. Sullivan
Republican
Elected U.S. senator
Mary Peltola
Democratic

The 2026 United States Senate election in Alaska was held on November 3, 2026, to elect a member of the United States Senate to represent the state of Alaska. Democratic former representative Mary Peltola defeated Republican incumbent Dan S. Sullivan.

A nonpartisan primary election was held on August 18 to determine the four candidates in the general election. Peltola and two-term incumbent Sullivan advanced with 49.5% and 41.4% of the vote respectively, followed by former teacher Daniel J. Sullivan Jr. and Republican perennial candidate Gerald Heikes.

Daniel J. Sullivan Jr.’s candidacy drew allegations of being a spoiler due to the similarity of his name to the incumbent's, but he was allowed to remain on the ballot by the state Supreme Court. The Trump administration subsequently filed a lawsuit to block the election results if Dan S. Sullivan lost by a small margin. The lawsuit was rejected and the margin was greater than the amount of votes for the other Sullivan.

Peltola won by the largest margin for a Democrat in an Alaska senate race since 1974 and became the first Democrat to win a U.S. Senate election in Alaska since 2008, and the first Alaska Native senator. She will join Lisa Murkowski, making Alaska one of few states to have ever had a female senate delegation. The state was one of ten that were carried by Donald Trump in 2024 but elected a Democratic senator in 2026.

== Candidates ==
=== Republican Party ===
==== Advanced to general ====
- Dan S. Sullivan, incumbent U.S. senator (Note: Explicitly identified as "Incumbent" on the primary and general election ballots, per a decision by the Alaska Division of Elections.)
- Daniel J. Sullivan Jr., (Note: Name shown as displayed on the primary and general election ballots, per a decision by the Alaska Division of Elections.) retired educator (no relation to the incumbent) (Note: Listed without a party affiliation on the ballot, per a decision by the Alaska Division of Elections, although he had filed for candidacy as a Republican.)
- Gerald L. Heikes, sheetrocker and perennial candidate (Note: Advanced after David Leslie withdrew.)

==== Eliminated in primary ====
- Dustin Darden, perennial candidate
- Fred C. Grauberger, retired motor vehicle operator
- Richard Benedict Mayers, white supremacist and perennial candidate
- Heather McElwain, editor

==== Withdrawn ====
- Christopher Miklos, businessman

=== Democratic Party ===
==== Advanced to general ====
- Mary Peltola, former U.S. representative from Alaska's at-large congressional district (2022–2025)

==== Withdrew after advancing to general ====
- David Leslie, LGBTQ+ activist

==== Eliminated in primary ====
- Carol Hafner, former flight attendant and perennial candidate

==== Withdrawn ====
- Ann Diener, sales executive at the Fairbanks Daily News-Miner
- William Lee Hunt, former Fairbanks District Attorney's Office administrative clerk and independent candidate for president in 2024 and 2028 (running for Alaska state senate)

=== Libertarian Party ===
==== Eliminated in primary ====
- Scott Kohlhaas, consultant

=== Green Party ===
==== Eliminated in primary ====
- Richard Grayson, author and perennial candidate

=== Alaskan Party ===
==== Eliminated in primary ====
- Earl D. "Skip" Southworth, former Unalaska city councilor

=== Independents ===
==== Eliminated in primary ====
- Sidney "Sid" Hill, political gadfly and candidate for U.S. Senate in 2014 and 2022
- Reece J. Roberts, paramedic
- Shirley Saucerman, medical doctor

== Primary election ==
Under Alaska's voting system, all candidates, regardless of party, run on the same primary ballot. The top four candidates in the primary advance to the general election. There is no ranked choice in the primary election: each voter selects a single candidate.

=== Background ===
Incumbent Republican Dan S. Sullivan announced his run for re-election in early 2025. He was first elected in 2014, defeating Mark Begich, the most recent Democrat to represent Alaska in the U.S. Senate. He was last re-elected in 2020, prior to the implementation of Alaska's ranked-choice voting system. Facing few obvious swing state targets to regain the Senate majority in 2026, Democrats began looking towards more Republican-leaning states, such as Ohio and Texas, as potential targets. Among these states was Alaska, where Senate Democratic leader Chuck Schumer heavily courted former U.S. Representative Mary Peltola, the last Democrat to win any statewide election in Alaska, to run for Senate. Peltola narrowly lost her congressional seat in 2024, and had considered running for either Senate or governor, but she decided to enter the Senate race in early 2026, setting up the race between her and Sullivan.

In July 2026, the Alaska Division of Elections moved 3,048 voters to "inactive" on its voter rolls based in part on flawed and outdated federal data indicating they might not be citizens. The Alaska Division of Motor Vehicles often includes citizens who do not reach back out to update their citizenship status to the DMV after naturalization. Historically, the Alaska DMV provided 300 names every three months for verification. Voters can still vote with a 'Question ballot' attesting that they are citizens but have to fill out additional paperwork for their vote to count. 700 Alaskans were able to restore their status on the active list as of August 12, 2026. The department said it was able to deregister 100 voters who were not citizens and who wished to be taken off the list. They may have been some of the noncitizens added by mistake by DMV employees. The state was accused of violating federal law by some state legislators and the state chapter of the ACLU by conducting a "systematic purge" of active voter rolls within 90 days of an election.

=== Campaign ===
According to most predictors, Peltola's January entry into the race immediately made the race competitive. She still faced significant hurdles, such as Sullivan's incumbency, the lack of a prominent Republican challenger, the unpopularity of the national Democratic Party in Alaska, and a reduction in cross-party support. Lisa Murkowski, Alaska's other U.S. Senator and a noted moderate Republican, had endorsed Peltola in her 2022 and 2024 bids for U.S. House, but she endorsed Dan S. Sullivan in this race instead. However, as Trump's unpopularity grew, especially as the 2026 Iran war began and continued, Peltola's chances of flipping the Senate seat grew.

Over the course of the primary campaign, a super PAC called Fair Deal Alaska, registered to a virtual office address in Wasilla, spent around $770,000 promoting Green Party candidate Richard Grayson and Democrat Carol Hafner in what the Alaska Beacon and the Anchorage Daily News described as an apparent attempt to dilute support for Peltola in the general election. Another PAC called American Democracy Project spent over $240,000 to promote Democrat David Leslie. A similar group called Right for Alaska spent $1.2 million promoting Republican Gerald Heikes and Alaskan Party candidate Earl "Skip" Southworth, who were considered more likely to draw support from Dan S. Sullivan. Both Grayson and Leslie expressed concern about the outside spending on their behalf to the Anchorage Daily News. Grayson—a satirical candidate living in Arizona—said that he supported Peltola and pledged to withdraw if he advanced to the general election.

=== Endorsements ===
Scott Kohlhaas (L)

Political parties

- Alaska Libertarian Party
Mary Peltola (D)

Executive branch officials

- Pete Buttigieg, former secretary of transportation (2021–2025)
- ~~Kamala Harris, former vice president of the United States (2021–2025)~~ (endorsement rejected by candidate)

U.S. senators

- Elissa Slotkin, Michigan (2025–present)

U.S. representatives

- Adam Kinzinger, former IL-16 (2013–2023) (Note: Previously represented the 11th district from 2011 to 2013) (Republican)

State legislators

- Tom Begich, former senate minority leader (2019–2023) from district J (2017–2023) and 2026 gubernatorial candidate

Party officials

- Eric Croft, chair of the Alaska Democratic Party (2025–present)
- David Hogg, former vice chair of the Democratic National Committee (2025)

Individuals

- Richard Grayson, writer and candidate for this seat (Green)
- Martin Sheen, actor
- Shannon Watts, founder of Moms Demand Action

Labor unions

- Alaska AFL-CIO
- American Federation of Government Employees
- Association of Flight Attendants
- National Education Association
- SEIU 775

Organizations

- Elect Democratic Women
- EMILY's List
- End Citizens United
- J Street
- Jewish Democratic Council of America
- National Organization for Women PAC
- Progressive Victory
- Reproductive Freedom for All
- Sealaska Corporation (previously endorsed Dan S. Sullivan)
Dan S. Sullivan (R)

Executive branch officials

- Tara Sweeney, former assistant secretary of the interior for Native American affairs (2018–2021)
- Donald Trump, president of the United States (2017–2021, 2025–present)

U.S. senators

- Lisa Murkowski, Alaska (2002–present)

U.S. representatives

- Nick Begich III, AK-AL (2025–present)

State legislators

- Lyman Hoffman, state senator from district S (1991–1993, 1995–present) (Democratic)
- John Lincoln, former state representative from the 40th district (2018–2021) (Independent) (Note: Lincoln was elected as a Democrat before leaving the party in 2019 and registering as an independent. He continued to caucus with the Democrats for the remainder of his term.)
- Gary Stevens, Senate president (2009–2013, 2023–present) from district C (2003–present)
- Bill Thomas, former state representative from the 5th district (2005–2013)

Party officials

- Brian Hove, Republican national committeeman for Alaska

Labor unions

- International Brotherhood of Teamsters Local 959

Organizations

- Americans for Prosperity
- Log Cabin Republicans
- NRA Political Victory Fund
- ~~Sealaska Corporation~~ (later endorsed Peltola)
- United States Chamber of Commerce
- 11 Alaska Native corporations (Note: Ahtna, Incorporated; Aleut; Arctic Slope Regional Corporation; Bering Straits Native Corporation; Bristol Bay Native Corporation; Calista Corporation; Chugach Alaska Corporation; Cook Inlet Region, Inc.; Doyon, Limited; Koniag, Incorporated; NANA Regional Corporation)

=== Fundraising ===
Campaign finance reports as of September 30, 2026 (Note: Names and party affiliations shown in this table are as given by the cited source (the Federal Election Commission).)
Candidate	Raised	Spent	Cash on hand
Mary Peltola (D)	$32,623,721	$29,463,904	$3,159,817
Dan Sullivan (R)	$13,760,054	$9,388,080	$5,103,717
Daniel J. Sullivan (R)	$30,230	$26,754	$3,476
Source: Federal Election Commission

=== Polling ===
Poll source	Date(s) administered	Sample size (Note: Key: A – all adults RV – registered voters LV – likely voters V – unclear)	Margin of error	Ann Diener (D)	Fred Grauberger (R)	Richard Grayson (G)	Sid Hill (I)	William Hunt (D)	Christopher Miklos (R)	Mary Peltola (D)	James Ryan (R) (Note: Candidate not running in this election)	Dan S. Sullivan (R)	Undecided
	June 1, 2026	Hunt withdraws from the race											
	April 21, 2026	Diener withdraws from the race											
	April 10, 2026	Miklos withdraws from the race											
Alaska Survey Research	March 19–22, 2026	1,283 (LV)	± 3.0%	2%	1%	1%	3%	1%	2%	46%	3%	41%	—

=== Primary results ===
Mary Peltola, Dan S. Sullivan, Dan J. Sullivan, and Gerald Heikes advanced to the general election.

Results by state house district: Peltola: 50–60%; 60–70%; 70–80%; D. S. Sullivan: 50–60%; 60–70%

Results by precinct: Peltola: 20–30%; 30–40%; 40–50%; 50–60%; 60–70%; 70–80%; 80–90%; 90–100%; D. S. Sullivan: 30–40%; 40–50%; 50–60%; 60–70%; 70–80%; 80–90%; Darden: 90–100%; Tie: 30–40%; 40–50%; 50%

Top-four primary results
Party	Candidate	Votes	%
Democratic	Mary Peltola	82,244	49.5
Republican	Dan S. Sullivan (incumbent)	68,726	41.4
No party listed (Note: Registered Undeclared)	Daniel J. Sullivan Jr.	4,107	2.5
Democratic	David Leslie (withdrew)	1,850	1.1
Republican	Gerald L. Heikes	1,741	1.1
Democratic	Carol Hafner	1,009	0.6
Republican	Heather McElwain	972	0.6
Republican	Dustin Darden	808	0.5
Alaskan	Earl D. "Skip" Southworth	803	0.5
Libertarian	Scott Kohlhaas	794	0.5
Republican	Richard Benedict Mayers	609	0.4
Independent	Reece Roberts	602	0.4
Independent	Sid Hill	522	0.3
Republican	Fred C. Grauberger	479	0.3
Green	Richard Grayson	432	0.3
Independent	Shirley Saucerman	306	0.2
Total votes		166,004	100.0

== General election ==
=== Campaign ===
Democratic candidate David Leslie placed fourth in the primary. Leslie, a democratic socialist who had criticized Peltola's stances on the Gaza genocide, environmental protection, and actions by U.S. Immigration and Customs Enforcement (ICE), initially said he would not withdraw but later reversed course, citing "pressure from not just the Alaska Democratic leadership, but many different institutions of power". Leslie's withdrawal allowed Republican perennial candidate Gerald Heikes to advance to the general election. Democratic-aligned groups spent over $2 million on ads promoting Heikes during the campaign. Heikes said that the ads used AI-generated imagery, but otherwise accurately presented his political views. Heikes had initially planned to run for US House in 2026, but said he decided to enter the Senate race after being promised support by a political operative from the Midwest.

On September 23, The New York Times published allegations from anonymous aides who had worked for Peltola's congressional office and Senate campaign. The report included text messages showing that Peltola had used an ableist slur and expressed hope that a board member of a local Planned Parenthood chapter "dies of a botched abortion". The anonymous aides also claimed that Peltola had used a homophobic slur, shoved a congressional aide, and ordered congressional aides to feed crickets to her family's pet chameleon. The Peltola campaign claimed that some of the allegations were false or exaggerated, and said that many of the alleged outbursts could be attributed to stress from the death of Peltola's husband and mother while she was serving in Congress. The Alaska Democratic Party and Republican senator Lisa Murkowski also defended Peltola, while Senator Sullivan and the Alaska Republican Party condemned her. Alaskan political analysts and operatives interviewed by the Anchorage Daily News did not believe the allegations would have a major impact on the election.

=== Dan J. Sullivan campaign and controversy ===
Daniel James Sullivan Jr. (born June 1957) is a retired teacher and United States Forest Service employee from Petersburg, Alaska, who filed to run as a Republican in the primary three days before the filing deadline. He is unrelated to both the Senator Daniel Scott Sullivan and former Anchorage mayor Daniel Albert Sullivan, whose 2014 campaign for lieutenant governor, in the same year as the senator's first Senate run, had likewise caused confusion among voters. Sullivan Jr. grew up in the Chicago metropolitan area, and has lived in Southeast Alaska since 1980. He worked for the United States Forest Service in his early career before beginning a career as an elementary school teacher. He taught in elementary schools for over 20 years before retiring. He was appointed to the city of Petersburg's Public Safety Advisory Board in December 2021, and he served in that position until October 2022, and he is listed on the Petersburg government website as "Dan Sullivan". He stated that he was a member of the Alaskan Independence Party from when he moved to Alaska in 1980 until the party's dissolution in late 2025.

J. Sullivan’s initial campaign announcement stated that he was "focused on unseating the incumbent, putting Alaska first, and restoring accountability, common sense, and public service to Washington, D.C." He later described himself as "a pragmatic Republican centrist" similar to Lisa Murkowski, with influence from Rand Paul. In an interview with the Petersburg Pilot, J. Sullivan stated that he had been considering running against the incumbent U.S. senator for 12 years, and remarked that he finally decided to run after the Senator's lack of opposition to the Anti-Weaponization Fund.

Senator Sullivan stated the campaign was "an effort to confuse Alaskans" and "dirty politics" by Democrats, calling J. Sullivan a "sham candidate". This was denied by J. Sullivan, as well as Peltola's campaign, the Alaska Democratic Party, and the Democratic Senatorial Campaign Committee. Senator Sullivan threatened legal action if the Lieutenant Governor of Alaska did not remove J. Sullivan from the ballot. He argued in an early June 2026 interview with CNN that "[Daniel James Sullivan's] whole purpose of running is to confuse Alaskans, to make him, make them think – Alaskan voters – that somehow he's me, so they could rig the vote in favor of Mary Peltola."

An analysis of Federal Election Commission records by KTUU-TV showed that J. Sullivan had donated to Peltola's previous campaigns, including $100 in 2022 and $30 in 2024. KTUU reported, "That financial history is the extent of the documented link between the Petersburg Sullivan and the Peltola campaign." His initial press release and website design were supported by political strategist Amber Lee, who has previously worked with Democratic campaigns in Alaska. Lee has publicly spoken in favor of Peltola's candidacy, including in a January 2026 interview with The Hill.

In its initial response to J. Sullivan's candidacy filing, the Alaska Division of Elections stated that Sullivan's name would appear on the ballot as "Sullivan, Dan J. (Registered Republican)". The Alaska Director of Elections later ordered his name removed from the ballot, saying his candidacy "was not filed in order to declare an actual good-faith candidacy for the office of United States Senator, but was instead filed with a purpose to confuse or mislead and to thereby compromise the ballot's fairness or neutrality", a decision he appealed. On June 26, Anchorage Superior Court judge Thomas A. Matthews reversed the Division of Elections' decision to exclude Sullivan from the primary ballot. Matthews' decision ruled that the "good-faith" standard for ballot access was not supported by Alaska law, the Division of Elections' regulations, or Article One, Section 3 of the United States Constitution. On July 2, the Alaska Supreme Court affirmed the decision, ordering his name to be listed on the August 18 primary ballot.

J. Sullivan was listed on the ballot by the state as "Sullivan, Daniel J. Jr.", while the Senator was listed as "Sullivan, Dan S. (Registered Republican) Incumbent". The state had not specifically identified any other incumbent as such in any other election in at least 10 years. J. Sullivan narrowly advanced to the general election.

On October 26, the Alaska Beacon reported that J. Sullivan had switched his registered party affiliation from Republican to "Undeclared" when requesting an absentee ballot for the August primary.

In late October, the U.S. Department of Justice filed a lawsuit seeking to block the election results if Dan S. Sullivan lost by a margin smaller than the amount of votes for the other Sullivan. Donald Trump admitted that this was done at his direction. A professor of law suggested that the suit seems to lack merit and stated that the "statute simply doesn't let the Department of Justice enjoin certification" and that the "lawsuit could well be mooted by a wide Democratic victory or a narrow Republican one, and if not, the court will likely dismiss it next month". Vanita Gupta, a former U.S. Associate Attorney General, had similar views on the lack of merit, basing it on the power granted to states to determine their own elections. It was dismissed by U.S. District Court Judge Sharon Gleason on November 1.

On October 28, it was reported by The New York Times that, according to Peltola's former campaign manager and longtime aide Elisa Rios, Peltola's campaign, the Democratic Senatorial Campaign Committee, and Democratic political operative Jerid Kurtz spent months on a "ballot composition project" to recruit spoiler candidates. This included finding a person with the same name as Senator Dan S. Sullivan, with that person ultimately being Daniel J. Sullivan Jr. Kurtz also allegedly traveled Alaska attempting to recruit other candidates. The project also included abandoned efforts to create a "MAGA party" that would further dilute Republican support. Rios also claimed Peltola was not involved but she was "definitely aware" of the project. A week before the article was published, "Ms. Rios ... contacted The Times", trying to retract "all statements made regarding the 2026 Alaska Senate Race". The Times ran the article anyway, disclosing that "The Times's standards do not obligate reporters to comply with such requests." The Times said that her "interviews were consistent with The Times's other reporting." Later that night Alaska Governor Mike Dunleavy announced a state criminal investigation into Peltola's campaign. On October 30, Alaska U.S. Attorney Michael Heyman told reporters in Anchorage that a federal investigation had already been underway "for several months". Peltola denied any knowledge of an effort to recruit another Dan Sullivan. Several donors who had given money to J. Sullivan’s campaign reported being visited by FBI agents. Heikes, the fourth candidate in the race, also reported being visited by FBI agents who served him with a subpoena to appear in federal court.

The controversy over J. Sullivan’s candidacy added to debate over 2026 Alaska Measure 2, which was also on the ballot, and proposed changing Alaska's nonpartisan primary system and eliminating ranked-choice voting. Supporters of the measure said that it would make it harder to add same-name spoiler candidates to the ballot, while opponents said the ranked-choice vote reduces the spoiler effect (in this case, by allowing supporters of either Sullivan to simply rank both as their top choices). The measure had been narrowly defeated in 2024, and was defeated again in 2026.

On the general election ballot, the candidates were again listed as "Sullivan, Dan S. (Registered Republican) Incumbent" and "Sullivan, Daniel J. Jr."

J. Sullivan was ranked first on less than 5,000 ballots. To scrutinize claims that he functioned as a spoiler candidate, The New York Times examined the state's data for these ballots, and found the most frequent second-choice among them was Peltola (29%), not Dan S. Sullivan (16%). Additionally, only half (50.3%) of Heikes' ballots went on to name either of the Sullivans second. The Times noted that despite this, President Donald Trump desired to interfere in the election, saying all votes for Sullivan Jr. and Heikes should "be immediately given to the REAL Dan [S.] Sullivan". Even still, such an attempt would not have changed the outcome.

On November 19, the Trump administration dropped the lawsuit.

=== Predictions ===
Source	Ranking	As of
ABC News	Tossup	November 3, 2026
CBS News	Tossup	October 30, 2026
The Cook Political Report	Tossup	November 2, 2026
Decision Desk HQ	Tossup	November 3, 2026
The Economist (Note: The Economist's prediction model uses unconventional terminology. For the purpose of equivalency, their "Very Likely" ratings are formatted as a "Likely" rating while "Likely" ratings are formatted as a "Lean" rating.)	Tossup	November 3, 2026
FiftyPlusOne	Lean D (flip)	November 3, 2026
Fox News	Tossup	November 1, 2026
Inside Elections	Tossup	October 29, 2026
MS NOW	Tossup	October 29, 2026
NBC News	Tossup	November 3, 2026
RealClearPolitics	Tossup	November 2, 2026
Sabato's Crystal Ball	Lean D (flip)	November 2, 2026
Silver Bulletin	Tossup	November 3, 2026
Split Ticket	Lean D (flip)	November 2, 2026

=== Debates and forums ===
2026 United States Senate election in Alaska debates
No.	Date	Host	Moderator	Link	Democratic	Republican
Key: P Participant A Absent N Not invited I Invited W Withdrawn						
Key: P Participant A Absent N Not invited I Invited W Withdrawn					Mary Peltola	Dan S. Sullivan
1	August 27, 2026	Alaska Oil and Gas Association	Michelle Egan	Vimeo	P	P
2	September 12, 2026	Kodiak Chamber of Commerce; KMXT (FM)	Gary Stevens; Sara Fraser	YouTube	P	P
3	October 15, 2026	Alaska Public Media; KTOO; Alaska's News Source	Lori Townsend; Liz Ruskin; Wil Courtney	YouTube	P	P

=== Post-primary endorsements ===
Dan S. Sullivan (R)

Executive branch officials

- George W. Bush, former president of the United States (2001–2009)
- JD Vance, vice president of the United States (2025–present)

U.S. senators

- John Cornyn, Texas (2002–present)

Local officials

- Dan A. Sullivan, former mayor of Anchorage (2009–2015) (unrelated to either Sullivan candidate)

Individuals

- Al Gross, orthopedic surgeon and candidate for this seat in 2020 (co-endorsement with Daniel J. Sullivan Jr.) (Independent)

Labor unions

- Public Safety Employees Association AFSCME Local 803

Organizations

- Citizens for Responsible Energy Solutions
- National Federation of Independent Business
- Safari Club International
- Sealaska Corporation (co-endorsement with Peltola)
Mary Peltola (D)

Statewide officials

- Tony Knowles, former governor of Alaska (1994–2002)
- Fran Ulmer, former lieutenant governor of Alaska (1994–2002)

Individuals

- Julia Louis-Dreyfus, actress
- Matthew Yglesias, journalist

Labor unions

- Communications Workers of America
- United Auto Workers
Daniel J. Sullivan Jr. (I)

Individuals

- Al Gross, orthopedic surgeon and candidate for this seat in 2020 (co-endorsement with Dan S. Sullivan) (Independent)
Declined to endorse

Organizations

- Planned Parenthood Alliance Advocates Alaska (endorsed against Dan S. Sullivan)

=== Fundraising ===
Campaign finance reports as of October 14, 2026
Candidate	Raised	Spent	Cash on hand
Dan S. Sullivan (R)	$14,107,205	$11,999,191	$2,839,758
Mary Peltola (D)	$36,887,509	$32,785,383	$4,102,126
Daniel J. Sullivan Jr. (I)	$30,556	$28,654	$1,902
Source: Federal Election Commission

=== Polling ===
Aggregate polls

Source of poll aggregation	Dates administered	Dates updated	Dan S. Sullivan (R)	Mary Peltola (D)	Other/ Undecided (Note: Calculated by taking the difference of 100% and all other candidates combined.)	Margin
270toWin	October 31 – November 1, 2026	November 2, 2026	45.5%	49.0%	5.5%	Peltola +3.5%
Decision Desk HQ	through November 1, 2026	November 2, 2026	47.8%	49.2%	3.0%	Peltola +1.4%
FiftyPlusOne	through November 1, 2026	November 3, 2026	47.4%	49.7%	2.9%	Peltola +2.3%
RealClearPolitics	October 8 – November 1, 2026	November 2, 2026	48.2%	49.2%	2.6%	Peltola +1.0%
Silver Bulletin	through November 1, 2026	November 3, 2026	45.9%	48.3%	5.8%	Peltola +2.4%
Average			47.7%	49.1%	3.2%	Peltola +2.1%

==== Ranked-choice polls ====
Poll source	Date(s) administered	Sample size	Margin of error	RCV round	Dan S. Sullivan (R)	Mary Peltola (D)	Dan J. Sullivan (I)	Gerald Heikes (R)	Undecided / Not Ranked
Alaska Survey Research	October 26–29, 2026	1,326 (LV)	± 3.0%						
Alaska Survey Research	October 26–29, 2026	1,326 (LV)	± 3.0%	1	46%	48%	3%	3%	–
Alaska Survey Research	October 26–29, 2026	1,326 (LV)	± 3.0%	2	47%	48%	5%	–	–
Alaska Survey Research	October 26–29, 2026	1,326 (LV)	± 3.0%	3	49%	51%	–	–	–
Data for Progress (D)	October 8–16, 2026	694 (LV)	± 4.0%	BA	44%	47%	4%	1%	3% U
Data for Progress (D)	October 8–16, 2026	675 (LV)	± 4.0%	1	46%	49%	4%	1%	3% NR
Data for Progress (D)	October 8–16, 2026	675 (LV)	± 4.0%	2	46%	49%	5%	–	3% NR
Data for Progress (D)	October 8–16, 2026	671 (LV)	± 4.0%	3	49%	51%	–	–	3% NR
Data for Progress (D)	October 8–16, 2026	660 (LV)	± 4.0%	3 (Note: Hypothetical scenario where voters who ranked Dan J. Sullivan and whose vote is exhausted when that candidate is eliminated are instead distributed to Dan S. Sullivan)	50%	50%	–	–	3% NR
InsiderAdvantage (R)	October 9–10, 2026	1,200 (LV)	± 2.8%	BA	43%	48%	2%	2%	5% U
InsiderAdvantage (R)	October 9–10, 2026	1,200 (LV)	± 2.8%	1 (Note: Gerald Heikes and Dan J. Sullivan were eliminated and their votes were distributed simultaneously)	48%	50%	–	–	2% U
Alaska Survey Research	October 1–3, 2026	1,512 (LV)	± 3.0%						
Alaska Survey Research	October 1–3, 2026	1,512 (LV)	± 3.0%	1	45%	47%	5%	3%	–
Alaska Survey Research	October 1–3, 2026	1,512 (LV)	± 3.0%	2	47%	48%	5%	–	–
Alaska Survey Research	October 1–3, 2026	1,512 (LV)	± 3.0%	3	49%	51%	–	–	–
Alaska Survey Research	September 10–12, 2026	1,352 (LV)	± 3.0%						
Alaska Survey Research	September 10–12, 2026	1,352 (LV)	± 3.0%	1	44%	48%	4%	4%	–
Alaska Survey Research	September 10–12, 2026	1,352 (LV)	± 3.0%	2	45%	50%	–	5%	–
Alaska Survey Research	September 10–12, 2026	1,352 (LV)	± 3.0%	3 (Note: Hypothetical continuation of elimination/distribution even though a candidate already exceeded 50%)	48%	52%	–	–	–
Fabrizio Ward (R)/ Impact Research (D) (Note: Poll sponsored by AARP)	September 8–11, 2026	800 (LV)	± 3.5%	BA	41%	45%	4%	3%	7% U
Fabrizio Ward (R)/ Impact Research (D)	September 8–11, 2026	800 (LV)	± 3.5%	1	43%	50%	4%	3%	7% NR
Fabrizio Ward (R)/ Impact Research (D)	September 8–11, 2026	800 (LV)	± 3.5%	2	45%	51%	4%	–	8% NR
Fabrizio Ward (R)/ Impact Research (D)	September 8–11, 2026	800 (LV)	± 3.5%	3	47%	53%	–	–	11% NR
Data for Progress (D)	July 28 – August 4, 2026	605 (LV)	± 4.0%	BA	41%	45%	4%	3%	5% U
Data for Progress (D)	July 28 – August 4, 2026	578 (LV)	± 4.0%	1	43%	49%	5%	3%	4% NR
Data for Progress (D)	July 28 – August 4, 2026	575 (LV)	± 4.0%	2	45%	50%	5%	–	5% NR
Data for Progress (D)	July 28 – August 4, 2026	567 (LV)	± 4.0%	3	47%	53%	5%	–	6% NR
Data for Progress (D)	July 28 – August 4, 2026	575 (LV)	± 4.0%	3	48%	52%	–	–	5% NR
Data for Progress (D)	July 28 – August 4, 2026	578 (LV)	± 4.0%	3 (Note: Hypothetical scenario where voters who ranked Dan J. Sullivan or Gerald Heikes and whose vote is exhausted when those candidates are eliminated are instead distributed to Dan S. Sullivan)	48%	52%	–	–	4% NR

==== First-past-the-post polls ====
Poll source	Date(s) administered	Sample size	Margin of error	Dan S. Sullivan (R)	Mary Peltola (D)	Dan J. Sullivan (I)	Gerald Heikes (R)	Other	Undecided
InsiderAdvantage (R)	October 31 – November 1, 2026	1,200 (LV)	± 2.8%	48%	48%	2%	1%	—	1%
InsiderAdvantage (R)	October 31 – November 1, 2026	1,200 (LV)	± 2.8%	50%	50%	—	—	—	—
AtlasIntel	October 28 – November 1, 2026	522 (LV)	± 4.0%	45%	50%	1%	2%	2%	—
New York Times/Siena University	October 23–30, 2026	610 (LV)	± 5.0%	46%	48%	—	—	0%	6%
Alaska Survey Research	October 26–29, 2026	1,326 (LV)	± 3.0%	46%	48%	3%	3%	—	—
Data for Progress (D) (Note: First-choice results from a ranked-choice poll)	October 8–16, 2026	694 (LV)	± 4.0%	44%	47%	4%	1%	—	3%
Public Policy Polling (D)	October 14–15, 2026	578 (RV)	–	47%	48%	—	—	—	5%
Rasmussen Reports (R)	October 12–15, 2026	775 (LV)	± 3.0%	42%	44%	3%	4%	—	6%
InsiderAdvantage (R)	October 9–10, 2026	1,200 (LV)	± 2.8%	43%	48%	2%	2%	—	5%
Alaska Survey Research	October 1–3, 2026	1,512 (LV)	± 3.0%	45%	47%	5%	3%	—	—
New York Times/Siena University	September 24 – October 1, 2026	504 (LV)	± 5.1%	43%	50%	—	—	—	6%
Quantus Insights (R)	September 28–30, 2026	758 (LV)	± 4.0%	46%	46%	2%	1%	–	5%
Quantus Insights (R)	September 28–30, 2026	758 (LV)	± 4.0%	47% (Note: Leaners pushed)	47%	2%	2%	–	3%
Quantus Insights (R)	September 28–30, 2026	758 (LV)	± 4.0%	50% (Note: Two-way)	50%	–	–	–	–
Trafalgar Group (R)	September 22–24, 2026	1,079 (LV)	± 2.9%	47%	46%	3%	1%	—	4%
co/efficient (R)	September 14–17, 2026	799 (LV)	± 3.5%	48% (Note: Full ballot)	46%	1%	1%	—	4%
co/efficient (R)	September 14–17, 2026	799 (LV)	± 3.5%	49% (Note: Only top two candidates)	46%	—	—	—	5%
Rasmussen Reports (R)	September 13–14, 2026	1,188 (LV)	± 3.0%	39%	39%	7%	6%	—	9%
Alaska Survey Research	September 10–12, 2026	1,352 (LV)	± 3.0%	44%	48%	4%	4%	—	—
Fabrizio Ward (R)/ Impact Research (D)	September 8–11, 2026	800 (LV)	± 3.5%	41%	46%	4%	3%	—	7%
Alaska Survey Research	August 20–23, 2026	1,495 (LV)	± 3.0%	49%	51%	—	—	—	—
	August 18, 2026	Primary election held							
Alaska Survey Research	August 2–5, 2026	1,371 (LV)	± 3.0%	49%	51%	—	—	—	—
Data for Progress (D)	July 28 – August 4, 2026	605 (LV)	± 4.0%	41%	45%	4%	3%	5%	–
New York Times/Siena University	June 15–29, 2026	593 (LV)	± 4.9%	47%	45%	—	—	2%	5%
Alaska Survey Research	June 4–7, 2026	1,393 (LV)	± 3.0%	44%	49%	—	4%	3% (Note: Dustin Darden (R) with 3%)	—
Alaska Survey Research	May 14–17, 2026	1,401 (LV)	± 3.0%	44%	48%	—	3%	5% (Note: Dustin Darden (R) with 5%)	—
Alaska Survey Research	April 16–19, 2026	1,946 (LV)	± 2.5%	43%	49%	—	—	8% (Note: James Ryan (R, undeclared) with 5%; Sid Hill (I) with 3%)	—
Alaska Survey Research	March 19–22, 2026	1,590 (LV)	± 2.7%	44%	49%	—	—	7% (Note: Christopher Miklos (R) with 5%; Ann Diener (D) with 2%)	—
Public Policy Polling (D) (Note: Poll sponsored by the Democratic Senatorial Campaign Committee.)	January 16–17, 2026	611 (V)	—	47%	49%	—	—	—	4%
	January 12, 2026	Peltola enters the race							
Alaska Survey Research	January 8–11, 2026	1,988 (LV)	± 2.2%	46%	48%	—	—	—	6%
Data for Progress (D)	October 17–23, 2025	823 (LV)	± 3.0%	45%	46%	—	—	5% (Note: "I would rank neither" with 5%)	4%
Alaska Survey Research	October 10–15, 2025	1,708 (LV)	—	46%	48%	—	—	—	6%
Alaska Survey Research	July 29 – August 1, 2025	1,623 (LV)	± 2.5%	47%	42%	—	—	—	11%
Data for Progress (D)	July 21–27, 2025	678 (LV)	± 4.0%	46%	45%	—	—	5%	4%
Alaska Survey Research	April 21–25, 2023	1,261 (LV)	—	41%	44%	—	—	—	15%

Hypothetical polling

Dan S. Sullivan vs. Mary Peltola vs. Christopher Miklos vs. Ann Diener

Poll source	Date(s) administered	Sample size	Margin of error	RCV round	Dan S. Sullivan (R)	Mary Peltola (D)	Christopher Miklos (R)	Ann Diener (D)
Alaska Survey Research	March 19–22, 2026	961 (LV)	± 2.7%	1	44%	49%	5%	2%
Alaska Survey Research	March 19–22, 2026	959 (LV)	± 2.7%	2	44%	50%	6%	–
Alaska Survey Research	March 19–22, 2026	951 (LV)	± 2.7%	3	48%	52%	–	–

Dan S. Sullivan vs. Mary Peltola vs. James Ryan vs. Sid Hill

Poll source	Date(s) administered	Sample size	Margin of error	RCV round	Dan S. Sullivan (R)	Mary Peltola (D)	James Ryan (R)	Sid Hill (I)
Alaska Survey Research	April 16–19, 2026	1,946 (LV)	± 2.5%	1	43%	49%	5%	3%
Alaska Survey Research	April 16–19, 2026	1,946 (LV)	± 2.5%	2	44%	50%	6%	–

Generic Republican vs. generic Democrat

Poll source	Date(s) administered	Sample size	Margin of error	Generic Republican	Generic Democrat	Undecided
co/efficient (R)	September 14–17, 2026	799 (LV)	± 3.5%	49%	44%	8%

=== Results ===
Mail-in absentee ballots, if postmarked by election day, may arrive at the election office at most 15 days afterward and still be counted. Within the first week, the Alaskan government had tabulated first-choice results from about 74% of the ballots. Additionally, they released the full rankings of about 200,000 ballots. On November 14, NBC News projected that Peltola was likely to win the race, a characterization which the organization announces if they have at least 95% certainty that a candidate will win their race. Their projection was based on Daniel S. Sullivan's underwhelming first-choice ranking performance, combined with his "effectively closed" path to win through a ranked choice tabulation. On November 17, after three further days of counting during which Peltola exceeded 50% of the total votes cast, NBC was joined by the Associated Press and CNN in calling the race for Peltola.

2026 United States Senate election in Alaska
Party	Candidate	Votes	%	±%
Democratic	Mary Peltola	144,486	50.13%	+8.94
Republican	Dan S. Sullivan (incumbent)	131,965	45.79%	−8.11
Republican	Gerald L. Heikes	6,105	2.12%	N/A
No party listed	Daniel J. Sullivan Jr.	4,765	1.65%	N/A
Write-in		886	0.31%	+0.14
Total votes		287,896	100.0%	
Turnout		290,323	47.95%	−12.71
Registered electors		605,433		
Democratic gain from Republican				

== Notes ==
Partisan clients
