= List of traditional territories of the Indigenous peoples of North America =

A traditional territory comprises all of the lands which an Indigenous nation ever claimed, not just the present-day reservation. This article is about the name for the traditional territory (the land or country) itself, rather than the name of the nation/tribe/people. The distinction between nation and land is like the French people versus the modern nation-state of France, the Saami people versus their land of Sápmi (sometimes rendered as "Saamiland"), or the Māori people versus their country: Aotearoa. For example, Mi'kma'ki is the traditional territory or country of the Mi'kmaw Nation.

In English, the land of an indigenous nation was historically, and sometimes still is, referred to as a "country," such as "(the) Micmac country" (compare "Country" in an Australian context). Some Latinate forms exist in English such as "Iroquoia", "Huronia", "Apachería", and "Comanchería".

== List of traditional territories ==
Autonym(s) for the traditional territory (Note: When the name of a traditional territory has several possible etymologies, only one or a few English translations are given here (for example Ojibwewaki = "Land of the Record Keepers" is only one of several possibilities). For more, see the Wikipedia article for each nation and the various folk etymologies and proposed etymologies for their national name.)	Conventional or historic English monikers for the traditional territory, with various attested spellings (Note: Though the column of conventional and historic English monikers is not meant to be a comprehensive list, and though some of the references are ephemeral, this column does give a snapshot of how the traditional territories have been spoken of in everyday English.)	The people affiliated with that territory	Further information
? The Aa'ku (Acoma Pueblo) traditional territory—autonym unknown.	the Acoma country, the Acoma homeland	Aa'ku (Acoma)	
? The A'aninin (Gros Ventre) traditional territory—autonym unknown.	Gros Ventre country, the Gros Ventre country, the Gros Ventre homeland	A'aninin (Gros Ventre)	See also Niitsitpiis-stahkoii, the traditional territory of the wider Blackfoot Confederacy.
ÁLEṈENEȻ ("Homeland"), ÁLEṈENEȻ TŦE W̱SÁNEĆ ("Homeland of the Salt Water People"), Á,LEṈENEȻ ȽTE ("Our homeland")	W̱SÁNEĆ territory, Saanich Territorial Homelands, Saanich Country	W̱SÁNEĆ (Saanich)	
? The Andastoerrhonon (Susquehannock/Conestoga) traditional territory—autonym is Conestoga Homeland	the Susquehannock country, the Susquehannock homeland, the Andaste country, Andaste, the Conestoga country, the Minquas country, the Minquas' Land, the Minquas land	Andastoerrhonon (Susquehannock/Conestoga)	In the Huron and French languages of the Jesuit mission era: Gandastogue, Andastoé, Andastogué ("country of Andastes")., Conestoga people today and traditionally call themselves Conestoga. The "co" part of the word is a prefix that refers to "people". The "ne" part of the word carries a tone that causes this part of the word to mean "of". The "stog" part of the word means "long ridge pole" (this is the short form of the translation) and refers to geologic formations. The "a" part of the word depending on syllable length means "country" or "nation". Conestoga Language is a tonal language in which tone changes word meaning, vowel length changes word meaning, and tone and vowel length can work together to change word meaning. Also, the English spelling does not accurately reflect the pronunciation of the word, but the pronunciation of the word by non-Conestoga speakers in the Conestoga Homeland is fairly accurate.
Anishinaabewaki, Anishinaabe Ahiki, Anishinaabe-aki, Anishinaabeg Akiing	Anishinaabe Country, Anishinaabe country, the Anishinaabe Aki	Anishinaabe are a supra-national identity which encompasses the three nations of the Three Fires Confederacy: the Ojibwe, the Odawa, and the Potawatomi, plus the culturally related Algonquin, Mississauga, and Nipissing.	Because the name "Anishinaabe" also serves as a synonym for "Ojibwe" or "Odawa" (or the other specific nations) and also means "Indian", the various forms of "Anishinaabe Aki" can also mean "Ojibwe country", "Odawa country" (and so forth), and also "Indian Country" in general. French: l'Anishinabe Aki. "The Nishnawbe Aski territory" refers to the land of the amalgamated national identity which was formed in 1983 by the OjiCree-, Ojibway-, Cree-, and Algonquin-speaking bands which were party to the two treaties which cover Northern Ontario. See also the entries for Ojibwewaki (Ojibwa country), Bodéwadmiakiwen (Potawatomi country), and Omàmiwininiwak (Algonquin) traditional territory.
Apsáalooke Issawua, Absarog-Issawua ("Land of the Children of the Large Beaked Bird")	Crow country, the Crow country, the Land of the Crow Indians	Apsáalooke (Crow)	
Atna Nenn' ("Land of the Ice People")	Ahtna Country, the Ahtna country	Ahtna (Copper River)	The traditional territory of the Upper Ahtna people is called Tatl'ahwt'aenn Nenn' ("Headwaters People's Country").
? The Attawandaron (Neutral) traditional territory—autonym unknown.	the Neutral country, the country of the Neutrals, the Neutrals' territory	Attawandaron (Neutral) Nation	The Kahkwa nation was either one of the Erie or Neutral nations, or the name in the Seneca language for the Neutral and Erie nations as a whole. In the Huron language, the Kahkwa traditional territory is called Atrakwae. In English, it has been referred to as "Kahkwa territory".
Báxoje Máya^{n} ("Land of the Gray Snow People")	Ioway country, the Iowa country	Báxoje (Iowa/Ioway)	In the Skiri Pawnee language: Pahkutawiru "among the Ioway, in Ioway country."
Bodéwadmiakiwen, Bodewadmi kik ("Land of the Keepers of the Fire")	the Potawatomi country, Potawatomi land	Bodéwadmi (Potawatomi)	In the Skiri Pawnee language: Raawaruhkisiru ("among the Potawatomi; in Potawatomi country"). See also Anishinaabewaki.
Chahta Yakni ("Land of Chahta")	Choctaw country, the Choctaw country	Chahta (Choctaw)	In Choctaw legend, "Chahta" is the name of the first man to come out of the earth.
Chicora	the land of Chicora	Chicora	Spanish: tierra de Chicora.
Chikashsha Yakni, Chikasha yakni ("Land of Chicksa")	Chickasaw Country, the Chickasaw country	Chikashsha (Chickasaw)	In Chickasaw legend, "Chicksa" is the name of the second man to come out of the earth.
Dákéyi ("Our land"), Dän Keyi ("Our people's land")	Southern Tutchone Territory	Southern Tutchone	
Dän Kezhi ("Land of the people")	Northern Tutchone Territory	Northern Tutchone	
Dane-z̲aa nanéʔ ("Land of the real people")	Dane-z̲aa territory; Beaver territory	Dane-z̲aa people	The Dakelh call the Dane-z̲aa Tsattine / Tsat'en and the Plains Cree called them Amiskiwiyiniw, both meaning "Those who live among the beaver" or "Beaver People."
Denaʼina Ełnena	Dena'ina territory; the Dena'ina homeland	Dena'ina people	
Denendeh ("Land of the People")	the Dene country	The Dene name has two primary meanings: 1) an identity which encompasses six ethno-linguistic communities: the Dehcho (South Slavey) Nation, Dënesųłiné (Chipewyan), Dinjii Zhuu (Gwich'in), Sahtúot'ine (North Slavey), T'atsaot'ine (Yellowknives), and Tłı̨chǫ (Dogrib). These six historic nations—or at least those portions dwelling in the Northwest Territories—prefer to be called the Dene Nation.; 2) In a wider sense, the name Dene encompasses all of the Northern Athabaskan peoples of Canada and Alaska.	The name "Denendeh", though now confined to the NWT, could conceivably be employed as a supra-national name for all the Northern Athabaskan traditional territories as a whole, in a similar way that "Anishinaabewaki" transcends modern political boundaries. See also Tłı̨chǫ Ndè (Dogrib country).
Diné Bikéyah ("Land of the People"), Naabeehó Bikéyah, Dinétah ("Among the People")	Navajoland, the Navajo country	Diné (Navajo)	In contrast to Diné Bikéyah, the name Dinétah can refer specifically to the original homeland, in contrast to the wider territory which resulted from the Navajos' westerly expansion in historic times. The name Naabeehó Bináhásdzo refers to the Navajo reservation jurisdiction and its political government.
Dule Nega, Dulenega, Tulenega ("House of the People"), Guna Yala ("Land of the Guna")	the Guna homeland, the Guna country, Guna country, the Dule homeland	Dule (Guna)	Besides being a name of entire traditional territory, Guna Yala is also specifically the name of the Panamanian political administrative comarca ("shire") where the Guna are based. That political division was formerly known as Comarca Guna Yala, the Province of San Blas, and the Comarca Tulenega.
Dusgaowehonoga, Dus-gaˊ-o-weh-o-noˊ-ga	Tuscarora country, the Tuscarora country	Ska-Ruh-Reh (Tuscarora)	See also Haudenosauneega (Iroquoia).
Eeyou Istchee ("People's land"); coastal northern: Iiyiyiu Aschii (ᐄᔨᔨᐤ ᐊᔅᒌ), coastal southern: Iiyiyuu Aschii (ᐄᔨᔫ ᐊᔅᒌ), inland: Iinuu Aschii (ᐄᓅ ᐊᔅᒌ)	East Cree Territory, James Bay Cree Territory	East Cree	Also called the James Bay Cree.
Gawi Wachi ("The Place of Nurturing")	the Tarahumara country, Tarahumara country, the Rarámuri country, Rarámuri country,	Rarámuri (Tarahumara)	
Gweugwehonoga, Gwe-uˊ-gweh-o-noˊ-ga ("Land of the People of the Great Swamp")	Cayuga Country, Cayuga country, the Cayuga country	Guyohkohnyoh (Cayuga)	See also Haudenosauneega (Iroquoia).
Haudenosauneega, Ho-de-no-sau-nee-ga ("Land of the People who are Building a Long House"), Aquanishuonigy	Iroquoia, the Iroquois Country, the Country of the Confederate Indians, the Country of the Five Nations, the Country of the Six Nations.	The Haudenosaunee (Iroquois) Confederacy. The confederated identity encompasses the Mohawk, Oneida, Cayuga, Seneca, and Onondaga. Other nations, such as the Tuscarora, were adopted by the Haudenosaunee in historic times.	French: L'Iroquoisie, Pays des Iroquois, Haudenosauneega or Aquanishuonigy is traditionally composed of five "countries": 1) "Aquanishuonigy proper" (the traditional territories of the Five Nations in New York), 2) Ohi-yo' (the Ohio Valley), 3) Tiiuchsochruntie (the Lower Peninsula of Michigan), 4) Couchsachrage (the Adirondack Mountains), and 5) Skaniadarade (Southern Ontario). See also Kanién:ke (Mohawk country), Onayotekaonoga (Oneida country), Gweugwehonoga (Cayuga country), Nundawaonoga (Seneca country), Onundagaonoga (Onondaga country), and Dusgaowehonoga (Tuscarora country).
Hiakim	the Yaqui country, the Yaqui homeland, Yaqui lands, Yaqui land, the Yaqui Homelands	Yoeme (Yaqui)	
Hinono'eino' Biito'owu'	Arapaho country, the Arapaho country, the Arapaho homeland, Arapahoe country, the Arapahoe homeland	Hinono'eino (Arapaho)	In the Skiri Pawnee language: Sariˀitihkawiru ("among the Arapahos, in Arapaho country").
Hopitutskwa, Hopi Tutskwa ("Land of the Peaceful Ones")	Hopiland, Hopi Land, Hopi lands, the Hopi Tutskwa, the Hopi country, Hopi country	Hopi	
ililîwaskiy (ᐃᓕᓕᐗᔅᑭᔾ) ("Land of the human beings")	Moose Cree Territory	Moose Cree	Moose Cree also go by the name Mōsonī.
ininîwaskiy (ᐃᓂᓂᐗᔅᑭᔾ) ("Land of the human beings")	Eastern Swampy Cree territory	Swampy Cree	Eastern Swampy Cree also go by the name Omaškêkowak (Omushkegowak; sing.: Omushkego).
Inokinki, Inokinghi ("Place of the Inoca")	the Illinois Country, the Illinois country, the country of the Inoca, the Inoca homeland	The Inoca (Illinois/Illini) Confederacy traditionally includes these five principal nations: Cahokia, Kaskaskia, Michigamea, Peoria, and Tamaroa. There were several other, more obscure member nations in the early historic period.	French: Pays des Illinois (not to be confused with the French political territory of the Illinois Country which was named after the indigenous traditional territory). The original meaning of the autonym Inoca, Inoka is presently unknown.
Inuit Nunaat, Inuit Nunangat ("Land of the People")	the Inuit homeland, the Inuit country, the Eskimo country	Inuit "We Eskimo are an international community sharing common language, culture, and a common land along the Arctic coast of Siberia, Alaska, Canada and Greenland. Although not a nation-state, as a people, we do constitute a nation." —Inuit Circumpolar Council-Alaska	Inuit Nunaat is used by the international Inuit Circumpolar Council; for example in the April 2009 "Circumpolar Inuit Declaration on Sovereignty in the Arctic." Two months later, in June 2009, the Canadian-sponsored Inuit organization changed the name of the specifically Canadian Inuit regions from Inuit Nunaat to Inuit Nunangat ("The People's Land, Water, and Ice"). The four Canadian Inuit regions are the Inuvialuit Settlement Region (Northwest Territories and Northern Yukon), Nunavut ("Our Land"), Nunavik ("Great Land", Northern Quebec), and Nunatsiavut ("Our Beautiful Land", Northern Labrador). There is also NunatuKavut ("Our Ancient Land"), the traditional territory of the NunatuKavummuit of southern Labrador. There are seven Alaskan Native Corporations (see ANC link for map) which are predominantly Inuit in composition: Arctic Slope Regional Corporation, NANA Regional Corporation, Bering Straits Native Corporation, Calista Corporation, Bristol Bay Native Corporation, Koniag, Inc., and Chugach Alaska Corporation. The existing Inuit-affiliated political divisions and regional corporations only partially reflect the traditional cultural and linguistic diversity of the Inuitic peoples. For example, the boundaries of the Danish political entity Kalaallit Nunaat are bigger than the traditional territory of the Kalaallit proper (West Greenland Inuit). There are two other Inuitic peoples in Greenland: the Tunumiit (East Greenland Inuit), who live in Tunu and the Inughuit (Polar Eskimos) of North Greenland.
Īthiniwaskiy (ᐁᖨᓂᐗᐢᑭᐩ) ("Land of the human beings")	Rocky Cree territory	Rocky Cree	Also called Asinikaw Īthiniwak, Rocky Cree are often grouped alongside Woodland Cree, though many see them as a distinct group of Cree.
Jiwére Máya^{n}, Wadodana Máya^{n} ("Land of the Otoes")	Otoe country, the Otoe country, the country of the Otoe Indians	Jíwere (Otoe) Nation	
Ǥáuidàumgya	Kiowa country, the Kiowa country, the Kiowa homeland	Ka'igwu (Kiowa) Nation	In the Skiri Pawnee language: Kaˀiwaru ("among the Kiowa; in Kiowa country").
Kanién:ke, Kanienkeh, Kanyę̂·ke ("Land of Flint"), Ganeagaonoga, Gä-neă-ga-o-noˊ-ga	Mohawk country, the Mohawk country, Mohawk territory, the Mohawk homeland, the Mohawk homelands, the Mohawk Territory	Kanienʼkehá꞉ka (Mohawk) Nation	In the Huron and French languages of the Jesuit mission era: Annien̈ę, Agné, Agne, Agnée, Agnié, Agniée, Agniés, Agniez ("the French appellation of Mohawks and their country.") In the Maliseet language: Meqewihkuk ("where Mohawks live; in, to Mohawk territory"). See also Haudenosauneega (Iroquoia).
Karúk Veezívzaaneen ("Land of the Upriver People")	Karuk Country, Karuk country, Karuk territory	Karuk	
Kaska Dena Kayeh, Kaska Kayeh, Kaska Dene Kʼéh Kayeh	Kaska territory, Kaska Dena territory, Kaska Dene Kʼéh territory	Kaska Dena	
Kootzagwae	Mono Lake Tribe; Mono Lake Paiute; Kucadikadi	The Kootzaduka’a (Kucadikadi) People	The name "Kootzaduka’a" is used by the band itself to refer to themselves as a people. They consider themselves a band of the Northern Paiute people. Therefore, the Kootzaduka'a homeland is Kootzagwae, which is part of the Northern Paiute homeland of Numu Tubewa.
Ktunaxa ʔamakʔis	Ktunaxa territory	Ktunaxa people	
Kulhulmcilh ("Our Land"); Nuxalkulmc ("Nuxalk Country")	Nuxalk country, Bella Coola country, the Bella Coola country	Nuxálk (Bella Coola)	
Lakhota Makhoche ("Land of the Allies")	Lakota Country, the Lakota Country, the Lakota country, the Lakota homeland, the Teton country, the Teton Sioux homeland	Lakhota (Teton Sioux)	The Lakota nation is one of seven nations of the Oceti Šakowiŋ, the Seven Fires Council of the Great Sioux Nation.
Lënapehòkink, Lenapehoking, Lenape Hoking ("In the People's Land"), Scheyischbi ("The Place Bordering the Ocean")	Delaware Indian country, the Delaware Indian country, Lenape country, the Lenape country	Lenape (Delaware)	Lenapehoking is reportedly a modern coining which could conceivably be used for any land which has been affiliated with the Lenape, such as the Ohio treaty lands and tribal jurisdiction in Oklahoma, while Scheyischbi refers to the original homeland on the Mid-Atlantic seaboard.
Lingít Aaní, Lingit Aani ("Land of the People of the Tides")	Tlingit country, the Tlingit country, the Tlingit Country, Traditional Tlingit Country, the Tlingit homeland	Lingít (Tlingit)	
Mánu: Yį Įsuwą ("Land of the River People")	Catawba Country, the Catawba country, the Catawba homeland	Iswa (Catawba)	
Massa-adchu-es-et ("Region of the Great Hills", "The Great-Hill Country")	Massachussett country	Massa-adchu-es-et (Massachusett)	In the Abenaki language: Msajosek ("where there are many hills"). The English colony, later U.S. state, was named after the traditional territory and its people. The traditional territory of the Agawam band of Massachusett is named Wonnesquamsauke ("Pleasant Water Place"); the name was shortened in English to "Agawam", "Squam", and "Annisquam".
Mayach ("The First Land, the Land Just Sprouted")	the Maya Homeland, the Mayan homeland	Uinicob (Maya)	
Mitchif Piyii	The Métis Homeland	Métis	The Homeland of the Métis is in the three Prairie Provinces (Manitoba, Saskatchewan, Alberta), as well as parts of Ontario, British Columbia, the Northwest Territories, and the Northern United States
Mēxihco ("Place of the Mexica")	the Mexica homeland, the land of the Mexica, the land of the Mexica Indians	Mēxihcah (Aztec)	The nation-state of Mexico is named after the traditional territory of the Mēxihcah people.
Mi'kma'ki, Migmagi ("Land of the Allies")	Mi'kmaq country, the Mi'kmaq homeland, Micmac country, the Micmac country, the Micmac homeland	Mi'kmaw (Micmac)	In the Passamaquoddy-Maliseet language: Mihkomahkik. See also Wabanahkik (Wabanaki country).
Môhikaniks, Monheganick ("Land of the Wolf People")	Mohegan country, the Mohegan country, the Mohegan Homeland, the Mohegan homeland	Mohegan	
? Mozhóⁿ Kaáⁿze, ? Kaáⁿze Mozhóⁿ, ? Makaáⁿze	Kaw Country, Kaw country, the Kaw country, Kansa country, the Kansa country, the Kaw homeland	Kanza (Kaw)	In the Skiri Pawnee language: Arahuuru ("in Kansa country").
Myaamionki ("Place of the Downstream People")	the Myaamiaki homeland, Miami country, the Miami country, the Miami Country, Miami Indian country, the Miami Indian country, the Miami homeland, homeland of the Miami Confederacy	Myaamiaki (Miami) and Confederacy. The Miami Confederacy traditionally includes the Miami Nation proper (the "Great Miami"), the Eel River, the Piankeshaw, and the Wea.	See also Waayaahtanonki (Wea country).
Nanticoke Ahkee, Nantaquak Ahkee, Nentego Ahkee ("Land of the Tidewater People"), Nanticoke Pamtuckquah ("River of the Tidewater People")	Nanticoke country, the Nanticoke country, Nanticoke territory, the Nanticoke homeland	Nentego (Nanticoke)	Nanticoke Pamtuckquah could refer to the original homeland along the Nanticoke River, while Nanticoke Ahkee would refer to post-exodus lands as well.
Na:tinixw ("Where the Trails Return" = Hupa Valley)	Hupa country, the Hupa country, the Hupa homeland, Hoopa country the Hoopa country	Hupa	
Nayantaquit, Nayantakick, Nianticut, Nehantick, Naïantukq-ut, Naantucke, Naihantick Niantic, Nehântick, ("At a point of land on a tidal river, estuary", "Of long-necked waters")	Niantic country, the Niantic country, the Niantic territory	Nehântick (Niantic)	
N'DahAhKiNaNa ("Our Ancient Heartland")	the Mohican country, the Mohican homeland	Muh-he-ka-neew (Mohican)	In the Abenaki language: Mahiganek ("At the Mohicans").
Ndakinna, N'dakina ("Our Land")	Abenaki country, the Abenaki country, the Abenaki homeland	Alnôbak (Abenaki)	In the Passamaquoddy-Maliseet language: Aponahkik. The traditional territory of the historic Wawenoc band, "the Wawenoc country", is called Mawooshen, "the Land of Mawooshen", Mavooshen, Moasham, and Mawashen, meaning "Berry Place." See also Wôbanakik (Wabanaki country).
nêhinawaskiy (ᓀᐦᐃᓇᐘᐢᑭᐩ) ("Land of the [W. Swampy] Cree")	Western Swampy Cree territory	Swampy Cree	Also go by the name Mushkegowuk (Maškēkowak; sing.: Mushkego / Maškēko).
nēhiýaw-askiy (ᓀᐦᐃᔭᐘᐢᑭᐩ) ("Land of the [Plains] Cree"), nēhiýānāhk (ᓀᐦᐃᔮᓈᕽ) ("In the Land of the [Plains] Cree"), Paskwāwiýinīnāhk (ᐸᐢᒁᐏᔨᓃᓈᕽ) ("In the Land of the Plains Cree")	Plains Cree territory, nêhiyaw territory, traditional Cree territory, the Cree country	Plains Cree	
Nīhithawīaskiy (ᓃᐦᐃᖬᐍᐊᐢᑭᐩ) ("Land of the [Woodland] Cree")	Woods Cree Territory, Woodland Cree Territory	Woodland Cree	
Newe Segobia ("The People's Earth Mother")	Western Shoshone country, the Western Shoshone homeland, Newe Country, the Newe Country	The Newe (Western Shoshone) People	"Newe country" and "the Newe country" has also been applied in English to the traditional territory of any and all of the Newe peoples (Shoshone, Bannock, and Paiute).
Niitsitpiis-stahkoii ("Land of the Original People"), Nitawahsin-nanni ("Our Land")	Blackfoot country, the Blackfoot country, Blackfeet Country, the Blackfoot homeland	The Niitsitapi (Blackfoot) Confederacy traditionally includes the Káínaa (Blood), Piikani (Piegan), Siksika (Blackfoot), Tsu T'ina (Sarcee), and the Haaninin (Gros Ventre).	See also the entry for Hinono'eino (Gros Ventre) traditional territory.
Nionwentsïo ("Magnificent Territory"), Wendake ("The Land Apart")	Huronia, the Huron country, the Wyandot country, Wyandotte country, the Wyandotte country, the Wendat country, the Huron-Wendat country, Old Huronia (=Wendake Ehen)	Wendat (Huron) and Wyandot	French: la Huronie, le pays des Hurons, Contrée des Hurons. In the Abenaki language: Ksitegwiiak ("Land of the Hurons"). Unlike the Wendat Nation in Quebec, the three Wyandot groups in the U.S. trace their origin to the Tionontati (Petun/Tobacco), Wenro, and Neutral nations, and to only one of the original Wendat nations (the Attignawantan nation), rather to the Wendat Confederacy as a whole.
Nippenit, Nipnet, Neepnet, Neipnett ("In a Place of Water", "Watering Place") Nipamaug, Nipmuck, Nipmug ("Freshwater Fishing-Place")	Nipmuc Country, Nipmuc country, the Nipmuck Country, the Nipmuck country, the Nipmuc country the Nipmuc homeland	Nipamaug (Nipmuc)	The traditional territory of the Wabaquasset band of Nipmuc is named Wabaquasset, Wabaquassuck.
Nitaskinan ("Our Land")	Atikamekw country, traditional homeland of the Tête-de-Boule Indians	Atikamekw (Têtes-de-Boules)	A historic French term is "pays des Têtes-de-Boules."
Nitassinan, Ntesinan ("Our Land")	Innu country, the Innu country, Montagnais country, the Montagnais country, the Innu homeland	Innu (Montagnais)	An early French name: "le pays des Montagnais". Nitassinan refers to Innu territory as a whole. Innu Assi ("Land of the People") refers to those lands within Nitassinan whose title is held by the Innu. In the Passamaquoddy-Maliseet language: Muhtaniyewihkuk ("In Innu Territory").
No-wa-mu ("Mother Earth")	Jemez country, the Jemez country, the Jemez homeland, the Jemez World	Walatowa (Jemez)	
Nʉmʉnʉʉ Sookobitʉ ("Comanche Earth")	Comanche country, the Comanche country, the Comanche homeland, the Comancheria, Comancheria	Nʉmʉnʉʉ (Comanche)	Spanish: Comanchería, la Comanchería. In the Skiri Pawnee language: Raarihtaaru ("among the Comanche; in Comanche country").
Nundawaonoga, Nun-daˊ-wä-o-noˊ-ga ("Land of the People of the Great Hill")	Seneca country, the Seneca country	Onondowahgah (Seneca)	See also Haudenosauneega (Iroquoia).
Ñút^achi Máya^{n} ("Land of the People of the River Mouth")	the Missouria homeland, the Missouria country	Ñút^achi (Missouria)	
Nutshimiu-aschiiy, Nuchimiiyu-chhiiy ("Land in the Country", "Land of the Interior"); St'aschinuw (ᒋᑦ ᐊᔅᒋᓄᐤ) (our [inclusive] land)	Naskapi country, the Naskapi country	Iyuw (Naskapi)	The Innu (Montagnais) consider the Naskapi to be a component band of their nation, yet the Naskapi generally conceive of themselves to be a distinct nation from the Montagnais, with their own language.
Nuu-chah-nulth Hahoulthee, nuučaan̓uł ḥaḥuułi, Nuu-chah-nulth Ḥahuułi, Nuu-chah-nulth Hahuulhi, nuučaanuł haḥuułi. ("Land all along the mountains and sea"; "Land of the Nuu-chah-nulth-aht / nuučaan̓ułʔatḥ")	Nuu-chah-nulth Country, Nuu-chah-nulth Territory	Nuu-chah-nulth-aht (nuučaan̓ułʔatḥ)	
Núuchi Tuvupu, Núuchi-tüvü-pü̱, Núu-agha-tʉvʉ-pʉ̱ ("Land of the People"; "People's Country")	Ute Country, Uteland	Ute	
? The Ogáxpa (Quapaw) traditional territory—autonym unknown.	Quapaw country, the Quapaw country, the Quapaw homeland	Ogáxpa (Quapaw)	In the Skiri Pawnee language: Uukaahpaawiru ("among the Quapaw; in Quapaw country").
Ojibwewaki ("Land of the Record Keepers")	the Chippewa country, the Ojibway country, Ojibwe country, Ojibwe Country, the Ojibwa country	Ojibwe (Ojibwa/Chippewa)	See also Anishinaabewaki.
? The Olekwo'l (Yurok) traditional territory—autonym unknown.	the Yurok country, Yurok country	Olekwo'l (Yurok)	In the Karuk language: Yurúk Veezívzaaneen ("Land of the Downriver People").
Omaeqnomenew-ahkew ("Land of the Wild Rice People")	Menominee country, the Menominee country, the Menominee homeland	Kiash Matchitiwuk (Menominee)	
? The Omàmiwininiwak (Algonquin) traditional territory—autonym unknown.	Algonquia, the Algonquin country, the Algonquin homeland	Omàmiwininiwak (Algonquin)	In the Abenaki language: Os8gonek ("Place of the Algonquin"), and in French: Algonquinie. See also Anishinaabewaki.
Onayotekaonoga, O-naˊ-yote-kä-o-noˊ-ga ("Land of the People of the Upright Stone") Onyota'a:ka', Onʌyoteʼa·ka·' ("People and Homelands of the Standing Stone")	Oneida country, the Oneida country, the Country of the Oneidas, the Oneida Territory, the Oneida homeland	Onayotekaono (Oneida)	See also Haudenosauneega (Iroquoia).
Onundagaonoga, O-nunˊdä-ga-o-noˊ-ga ("Land of the People of the Hills")	Onondaga Country, Onondaga country, the Onondaga country, the original country of Onondaga	Onundagaono (Onondaga)	See also Haudenosauneega (Iroquoia).
O'odham Jeweḍ ("Land of the People")	O'odham country, Papago and Pima country	O'odham (Papago and Pima)	Despite the outsiders' designations of "Pima" and "Papago", the trend among the O'odham people is to consider themselves to be bands of the same cultural nation: "The division of O'odham lands has resulted in an artificial division of O'odham society. O'odham bands are now broken up into 4 federally recognized tribes: the Tohono O'odham Nation, the Gila River Indian Community, the Ak-Chin Indian Community and the Salt River (Pima Maricopa) Indian community." (quote from the Tohono O'odham Nation website) In contrast to the entire traditional territory, O'odham ha-jeweḍga refers to the political Tohono O'odham Indian Reservation. Tohono ("Desert") is the O'odham name for the Tohono O'odham (Pagago) portion of O'odham Jeweḍ. The Spanish name for this portion is Papaguería, which has also been used in English. The name "Tohono country", "the tohono jewed", "Papago country", "the Papago country", and "the Papago homeland" are also attested. For the Akimel O'odham (Pima) portion of the traditional territory, the names "Pima country", "the Pima country", and "the Pima homeland" are attested.
Paariru ("Among the Pawnee; Pawnee country")	Pawnee country, the Pawnee country, the traditional Pawnee homeland	Paari (Pawnee)	Of the Pawnee band territories, the Skiri (Skidi Pawnee) country is named Ckiiriru and the Chawi (Republican Pawnee) country is named Cawiiriru.
Panaôbskaiiak ("Land of the Penobscots")	the Penobscot country, the Penobscot homeland	Panawahpskek (Penobscot)	In the Eastern Abenaki spelling (the Penobscot national language is nearly identitical to Eastern Abenaki): Pana8bskaiiak ("Land of the Penobscots"). In Western Abenaki spelling: Panȣbskaik, Panaȣbskaiiak. In the Passamaquoddy-Maliseet language: Panuwapskek.
Páⁿka Mazhóⁿ	Ponca country, the Ponca country, the Ponca homeland	Paⁿka (Ponca)	In the Skiri Pawnee language: Riihitawiru ("among the Ponca").
Peskotomuhkatihkuk ("[in the] Land of the people at the place where pollock are plentiful"), Peskotomuhkatik ("in Peskotomuhkati territory")	Passamaquoddy territory, Passamaquoddy country	Passamaquoddy	Part of the Wabanaki Confederacy.
Pequatit ("At the Destroyers")	Pequod, Pequot country, the Pequot country, the old Pequot homeland, the Pequt countrey	Pequttôog (Pequot)	The traditional territory of the Wunnashowatuckoog band of Pequot is Wunnashowatuckqut or (shortened) Showatuckqut ("Where the River Splits").
Peskotomuhkatik, peskotomuhkatihkuk ("In the Land of the Polluck-Spearers")	Passamaquoddy country, Passamaquoddy territory the Traditional Ancestral Homeland Territory of the Passamaquoddy Tribe, traditional Passamaquoddy territory, Passamaquoddy Territory, the Passamaquoddy Territory, Passamaquoddy Ancestral Territory, Passamaquoddy Homeland Territory	Peskotomuhkati (Passamaquoddy)	See also Waponahkik (Wabanaki country).
Pokanoket ("Land of the Bitter Water Bays and Coves"), Nutahkeemun ("Our [exclusive] land")	Wampanoag Country, Wampanoag country, the Wampanoag Homeland, the Wampanoag homeland, Wampanoag territory, the Wampanoag territory	Wôpanâak (Wampanoag)	
? The Sahnish (Arikara) traditional territory—autonym unknown.	Arikara country, the Arikara country, the Sahnish homeland	Sahnish (Arikara)	In the Skiri Pawnee language: Astarahiru ("among the Arikara, in Arikara country").
S'atsoyaha ("Land of the Sun-fire People"), S'atsole yudjiha ("Yuchi Homeland")	Yuchi country, the Yuchi country, Euchee country, the Yuchi homeland, the Uchee country,	Tsoyaha (Yuchi)	
Shawandasse Tula ("Southwind Earth")	Shawnee country, the Shawnee country, the Shawnee homeland	Shaawanwaki (Shawnee)	
Shiwinnaqin ("At the Flesh People"), Halona Idiwan’a ("Middle Place")	Zuniland, Zuni Country, Zuni's aboriginal territories, the A'shiwi country	A:shiwi (Zuni)	
S’ólh Téméxw ("Our Land")	Stó:lō traditional territory, Sto:lo country, the Sto:lo country, Stolo country	Sto:lo (Fraser River)	
Sq'ʷayáiɬaqtmš	Chehalis Indian Country, the Chehalis country	Q'ʷay'áy'iɬq' (Chehalis)	
? The Téenek traditional territory—autonym unknown.	The Huasteca, Wasteka, the La Huasteca, the Huastec homeland	Téenek (Huastec)	In the Nahuatl language: Cuextlan, Kuextlan. In Spanish: la Huasteca.
Thâkînâwe, Sâkînâwe ("Land of the Yellow Earth People")	the Sac country, the Sauk country, the Sauk homeland	Othâkîwaki (Sauk/Sac)	In the Skiri Pawnee language: Saakiiwaru ("among the Sauk, in Sauk country").
? The Tickanwa•tic (Tonkawa) traditional territory—autonym unknown.	Tonkawa country, the Tonkawa country	Tickanwa•tic (Tonkawa)	In the Skiri Pawnee language: Tarikawiru ("among the Tonkawas, Tonkawa country").
Tin-ta-mayuhk ("My Country"), Sḵwx̱wú7mesh-ulh ("Relating to the People of the Sacred Water"), Sḵwx̱wú7meshulh Temíx̱w (Land related to the People of the Sacred Water), Sko-mish-oath	the Squamish Country, the Squamish country, Squamish territory	The Skwxwú7mesh (Squamish) Nation	The Skwxwú7mesh interviewee who shared the name Tin-ta-mayuhk also says: "Musqueams have a name too, same word, but pronounced differently; people up Lillooet have different name;" (sounds like Tsasch) "all mean the same, 'my country.'"
Tłı̨chǫ Ndè, Tlicho Nde ("Land of the Dog-Flank People")	the Dogrib country	Tłı̨chǫ (Dogrib)	See also Denendeh.
Továngar ("The World")	Tongva country, the Tongva homeland, Tongva-Gabrielino country, Gabrielino country, the Gabrielino country, the Gabrieleno homeland	Tongva (Gabrielino)	
Tsalagihi Hawiniditlv Gesvi (ᏣᎳᎩᎯ ᎭᏫᏂᏗᏢ ᎨᏒᎢ; "Cherokee country", lit. "Cherokee within it-was"), Tsalaguwetiyi (ᏣᎳᎫᏪᏘᏱ ; "the old Cherokee lands"; uweti = 'old'; this name appears to specifically refer to the original traditional territory in the east)	Cherokee Country, Cherokee country, the Cherokee country, the Cherokee homeland	Aniyvwiya (Cherokee)	
Tsenacommacah, Tsenacomoco, Tenakomakah, Attanoughkomouck, Attan-Akamik ("Land of Much Events")	the Powhatan country, Powhatan country, the Powhatan homeland, Powhatan's territory	PoHaTan (Powhatan) Confederacy	Tsenacommacah is also glossed as "Virginia". The name was perceived by the early English settlers to be the native equivalent for what they called "Virginia". Tsenacommacah appears to be cognate with Ojibwe danakamigad "be an activity, be an event, happen". Arahatecoh is the traditional territory of the Arrohattoc nation within the Powhatan confederacy.
Tséstho'e, Zesthoe ("Land of Our People")	Cheyenne country, the Cheyenne country, the Cheyenne homeland	Tsitsistas and So'taeo'o (Cheyenne)	In the Skiri Pawnee language: Sahiiru ("in Cheyenne country").
Tupippuh Nummu ("Our Homeland")	the Timbisha Homeland, Timbisha country, the Panamint country	Timbisha	
? The Tutunucu (Totonac) traditional territory—autonym unknown.	Totonac country, the Totonac country, the Totonac homeland,	Tutunucu (Totonac)	In the Nahuatl language: Totonacapan ("Place of the Totonac").
Unangam Tanangin ("Lands of the original people," "Lands of the Unangan / Unangas / Aleuts")	Aleutian Islands	Aleuts	"Aleut" possibly comes from the Chukchi aliat meaning "island." The Russian term "Aleut" was a general term used for both the Unangan / Unangas of the Aleutian Islands and their neighbours to the east in the Kodiak Archipelago, the Alutiiq or Sugpiat.
Waayaahtanonki ("Place of the Whirlpool")	the Wea country, the Wea lands	Waayaahtanwa (Wea)	See also Myaamionki (Miami country).
Wapna'ki (in Mi'kmawi'simk), Waponahkik (in the Wolastoqey-Passamaquoddy language), Wôbanakik or W8banaki (in the Abenaki language). These all mean "Land of Dawn, Land of the First Light".	the Dawnland, Wabanaki country, the Wabanaki country, Wabanaki Country, the land of the Wabanaki, Wabanakia	The Wabanaki Confederacy includes the Mi'kmaq, Maliseet, Passamaquoddy, Penobscot, and Abenaki.	The name for the Dawnland in other Algonquian languages: Wàbanaki (in Algonquin), Waabanaki (in Ojibwe), Waabnaki (in Odawa), Wabneki (in Potawatomi).
𐓏𐓘𐓻𐓘𐓻𐓟 𐓀𐓘͘𐓻𐓘͘ (Wažaže Mązhą), 𐓏𐓘𐓻𐓘𐓻𐓟 𐓀𐓘𐓩𐓻𐓘𐓩 (Wazhazhe Maⁿzhaⁿ) ("Osage Country")	Osage country, the Osage country, the great Osage homeland, the Osage homelands, the Osage ancestral territory	Wah-Zha-Zhi (Osage)	In the Skiri Pawnee language: Pasaasiru ("among the Osages; in Osage territory").
Wašišiw Ɂítdeʔ Wa She Shu E Deh ("The People from Here")	Wašiw lands, Washoe country, the Washoe country	Wašiw (Washoe)	
W̓áxv:w̓uísax̌v or Haíɫzaqv W̓áwís	Heiltsuk Country	Hailzaqv (Heiltsuk)	
Wazija Haci ("Those who dwell in the pines"), Wazija, Wazidja, Waazija ("The Grand Pinery")	the Wazija, the Wazidja, the Hočąk Wazija, the land of the Hočągara, Ho-Chunk country, Winnebago country, the Winnebago country, the Winnebago homeland	Ho-Chunk	An early French name: pays des Puants.
Wintʰu· Po·m ("Land of the People")	Wintu country	Wintu	There are traditionally nine band territories, such as wenem memen bos ("the middle water place/country"), and nomte pom or Nom ti pom ("In the west country").
Wolastokuk ("Land of the Beautiful River")	Maliseet country, the Malecite country	Wolastoqiyik (Maliseet)	See also Waponahkik (Wabanaki country).
X̱aaydag̱a Gwaay.yaay, Xhaaidlagha Gwaayaai, Xaadala Gwayee ("Islands at the Edge of the World"), X̱aayda gwaay, Haida Gwaii ("Islands of the People"), Xaadas tlagáa ("Haida Country, Haida village, Haida lands")	Haida country, the Haida homeland	The X̱aadas (Haida) Nation	
Yagaocanahagary ("Land Between the Two Points")	Piscataway Country	Piscataway (Conoy)	
? The Yokot'anob (Chontal) traditional territory—autonym unknown.	the Chontalpa, the Chontal homeland	Yokot'anob (Chontal)	In the Nahuatl language: Chontalpa ("Land of the Foreigners"). In Spanish: la Chontalpa. "Chontalpa" remains the name of a Mexican economic planning region coterminous with four political municipalities.

== Criteria for inclusion ==
For the purpose of this list, "nation" refers to the historic, whole national identities, rather than to the fragmented "reservation nations" or "bands". The whole nations are what John Beaucage, Grand Council Chief of the Anishinabek Nation, refers to as "true nations" in contrast with the fragmented "First Nations":

"First Nations must work towards the restoration of our own model of nationhood made up of our true nations. In essence, moving away from 633 First Nations—from Aamjiwnaang to Zhiibhaasing—to governance based on the nearly 60 indigenous nations, from the Abenaki Nation to the Wendat Nation and all those in between."

— John Beaucage, "A Vision of a New Assembly of First Nations" (emphasis added), 2009

Or what the Government of Quebec calls "the 11 aboriginal nations of Québec" in contrast with their component "55 aboriginal communities". And so the criteria for inclusion is not the same as what are named "Indian tribes" by the U.S. Federal Register and the National Congress of American Indians (NCAI), or what are called "First Nations" by the Canadian government and Assembly of First Nations (AFN). It would be interesting to compile the names for the "band territories" of the 633 fragmented First Nations of the AFN, or the names of the "reservation territories" of the 632 fragmented Indian Nations of the NCAI, but that is beyond the scope of this article, except as side notes in the "further information" column.

So this list does not include the names for reservations or reserves, but only of the entire national homeland (or the homeland of a confederated identity such as the Haudenosaunee Confederacy or Colville tribes). For example, this list wouldn't give the Cherokee name for the Qualla Boundary reservation, but only the name for "the Cherokee country" as a whole. Ideally a single name could conceivably encompass not only the Contact-era ancestral territory, but also any area which at some time or another was conceived to be part of the national domain, such as post-Removal lands.

"Northeastern Oklahoma is the seat of government for the sovereign nation of the Miami Tribe of Oklahoma. However, all of the lands where the Miami have lived over time are still referred to as "Myaamionki" (the Place of the Myaamia)."

— The Miami Tribe of Oklahoma.

The names do not have to be from olden days. The names could be recently coined and still be included in this list.

Compiling a list such as this can be a difficult and controversial process, as it requires some discernment as to what are the "whole nations" — the "true nations" in Beaucage's words.
