= Inuit Arctic Business Alliance =

Alaska Native regional corporation

Inuit Arctic Business Alliance is a partnership between three Alaska native corporations, the Arctic Slope Regional Corporation, NANA Regional Corporation and Bering Straits Native Corporation. The alliance board is headed by Rex Rock.
