= Chugach (disambiguation) =

Chugach may refer to:

- Chugach people, an Alutiiq people of southcentral Alaska
- Chugach Alaska Corporation, an Alaska Native Regional Corporation
- Chugach Census Area, Alaska, a census area within the unorganized borough in Alaska
- Chugach National Forest, a national forest in southcentral Alaska
- Chugach Mountains, a mountain range in southcentral Alaska
- Chugach State Park, a state park in southcentral Alaska
