= Indian nation =

Indian nation may refer to:

- India, a country in South Asia
- Indigenous peoples of the Americas, most of which were historically known as Indians
  - American Indian tribe, indigenous peoples of the contiguous United States

== India ==
- Princely state – Indian vassal states under the British Raj
- The Indian Nation, a newspaper in the Republic of India

== North America ==
- The Indian Nation (film), an alternate title for the 1940 American film Cherokee Strip
- Indian Nation Turnpike, a toll road in Oklahoma, United States

== See also ==
- Indian country (disambiguation)
