= Knight Island (Alaska) =

Island in Alaska

Coordinates: 60°21′58″N 147°44′22″W

Knight Island is an island in western Prince William Sound of the Gulf of Alaska in the U.S. state of Alaska.

The island has a land area of 277.166 km^{2} (107.014 sq mi) and no resident population as of 2000. The majority of the island is a part of Chugach National Forest; Alaska native corporations Chugach Alaska Corporation and Chenega Corporation are the two other major landowners.

Shorelines on the eastern and northwestern part of the island were heavily covered in oil after the Exxon Valdez oil spill, northeast of the island, in 1989.
