= Indian reserve (disambiguation) =

The terms Indian Country, Indian Reserve, Indian Reservation, Indian Territory and Indian Land may be easily confused. Articles on related topics are titled as follows:

== Places ==
=== Places for groups of Indigenous peoples to live ===
- Indian colony, land reserved for urban Native American settlements, especially in Nevada and California
- Indian country (collectively or individually), the many self-governing Native American communities throughout the United States
- Indian reservation, a similar area for Native American tribes in the United States
  - List of Indian reservations in the United States
- Indian reserve, land reserved for First Nation peoples in Canada
  - Urban Indian reserve, an urban area later designated for First Nation peoples in Canada
  - List of Indian reserves in Canada
- Indigenous territory (Brazil)
- Indigenous territory (Bolivia)
- Indigenous territory (Colombia)
- Indigenous territory (Costa Rica)
- Autonomous administrative divisions of India
- Lands inhabited by Indigenous peoples, a more worldwide discussion of the topic

=== Other geographic areas ===
- Indian Land, South Carolina, a community in South Carolina
- Indian Mound Reserve, a park in Ohio, United States
- Indian Reserve (1763), a territory in British colonial America ceded by France to Britain and created by the Royal Proclamation of 1763
- Indian Territory, a historical territory in the United States of America
- Indiana Territory, a historical territory in the United States
- Union Territory, a sub-national administrative division of India that are ruled directly by the federal national government

== Arts, entertainment, and media ==
- Indian Country, a 1953 collection of stories by Dorothy M. Johnson
- Indian Country Today, a Native American news magazine
- "Indian Reservation", a 1979 song by Orlando Riva Sound (O.R.S.)
- "Indian Reservation (The Lament of the Cherokee Reservation Indian)", a 1971 hit song by Paul Revere and the Raiders

== Affirmative action program ==
- Reservation in India, an affirmative action program in India

== See also ==
- Indian barrier state
- Indian nation (disambiguation)
