= Alaska Native corporation =

Hotline 19451

The Alaska Native Regional Corporations (ANRCs) are regional corporations in the United States that administer and settle land and financial claims made by the Alaska Natives. The corporations were established in 1971 when the United States Congress passed the Alaska Native Claims Settlement Act (ANCSA), which provided for the establishment of 13 regional corporations to administer such claims.

== Associations, regional and village corporations ==
Under ANCSA the state was originally divided into twelve regions, each represented by a "Native association" responsible for the enrollment of past and present residents of the region. Individual Alaska Natives enrolled in these associations, and their village level equivalents, were made shareholder in the Regional and Village Corporations created by the Act. The twelve for-profit regional corporations, and a thirteenth region representing those Alaska Natives who were no longer residents of Alaska in 1971, were awarded the monetary and property compensation created by ANCSA. Village corporations and their shareholders received compensation through the regional corporations. The fact that many ostensibly Alaska Native villages throughout the state were not empowered by the ANCSA to form village corporations later led to a number of lawsuits.

The regional and village corporations are now owned by Alaska Native people through privately owned shares of corporation stock. Alaska Natives alive at ANCSA's enactment on December 17, 1971, who enrolled in a Native association (at the regional and/or village level) received 100 shares of stock in the respective corporation. In 2006, the 109th Congress passed S.449 which amended ANCSA, and allowed for shares to be more easily issued to those who had missed the enrollment, or were born after the enrollment period by reducing the requirement for voting from a majority of shareholders to a majority of attending shareholders at corporation meetings.

During the 1970s, ANCSA regional and village corporations selected land in and around native villages in the state in proportion to their enrolled populations. Village corporations own the surface rights to the lands they selected, but regional corporations own the subsurface rights of both their own selections and of those of the village corporations.

== Text of the act ==
The Act lays out the specifics of the corporations' status. Here is an excerpt of the relevant portion:

43 U.S.C. § 1606

(a) Division of Alaska into twelve geographic regions; common heritage and common interest of region; area of region commensurate with operations of Native association; boundary disputes, arbitration. For purposes of this chapter, the State of Alaska shall be divided by the Secretary within one year after December 18, 1971, into twelve geographic regions, with each region composed as far as practicable of Natives having a common heritage and sharing common interests. In the absence of good cause shown to the contrary, such regions shall approximate the areas covered by the operations of the following existing Native associations:

(1) Arctic Slope Native Association (Utqiaġvik, Point Hope, Point Lay, Wainwright, Atqasuk, Nuiqsut, Kaktovik, Anaktuvuk Pass);

(2) Bering Straits Association (Seward Peninsula, Unalakleet, Saint Lawrence Island);

(3) Northwest Alaska Native Association (Kotzebue);

(4) Association of Village Council Presidents (southwest coast, all villages in the Bethel area, including all villages on the Lower Yukon River and the Lower Kuskokwim River);

(5) Tanana Chiefs' Conference (Koyukuk, Middle and Upper Yukon Rivers, Upper Kuskokwim, Tanana River);

(6) Cook Inlet Association (Kenai, Tyonek, Eklutna, Iliamna);

(7) Bristol Bay Native Association (Dillingham, Upper Alaska Peninsula);

(8) Aleutian Pribilof Islands Association, Inc., formerly the Aleut League (Aleutian Islands, Pribilof Islands and that part of the Alaska Peninsula which is in the Aleut League);

(9) Chugach Native Association (Cordova, Tatitlek, Port Graham, English Bay, Valdez, and Seward);

(10) Tlingit-Haida Central Council (southeastern Alaska, including Metlakatla);

(11) Kodiak Area Native Association (all villages on and around Kodiak Island); and

(12) Copper River Native Association (Copper Center, Glennallen, Chitina, Mentasta).

[...]

(c) Establishment of thirteenth region for nonresident Natives; majority vote; Regional Corporation for thirteenth region. [...]

(d) Incorporation; business for profit; eligibility for benefits; provisions in articles for carrying out chapter. Five incorporators within each region, named by the Native association in the region, shall incorporate under the laws of Alaska a Regional Corporation to conduct business for profit, which shall be eligible for the benefits of this chapter so long as it is organized and functions in accordance with this chapter. The articles of incorporation shall include provisions necessary to carry out the terms of this chapter.

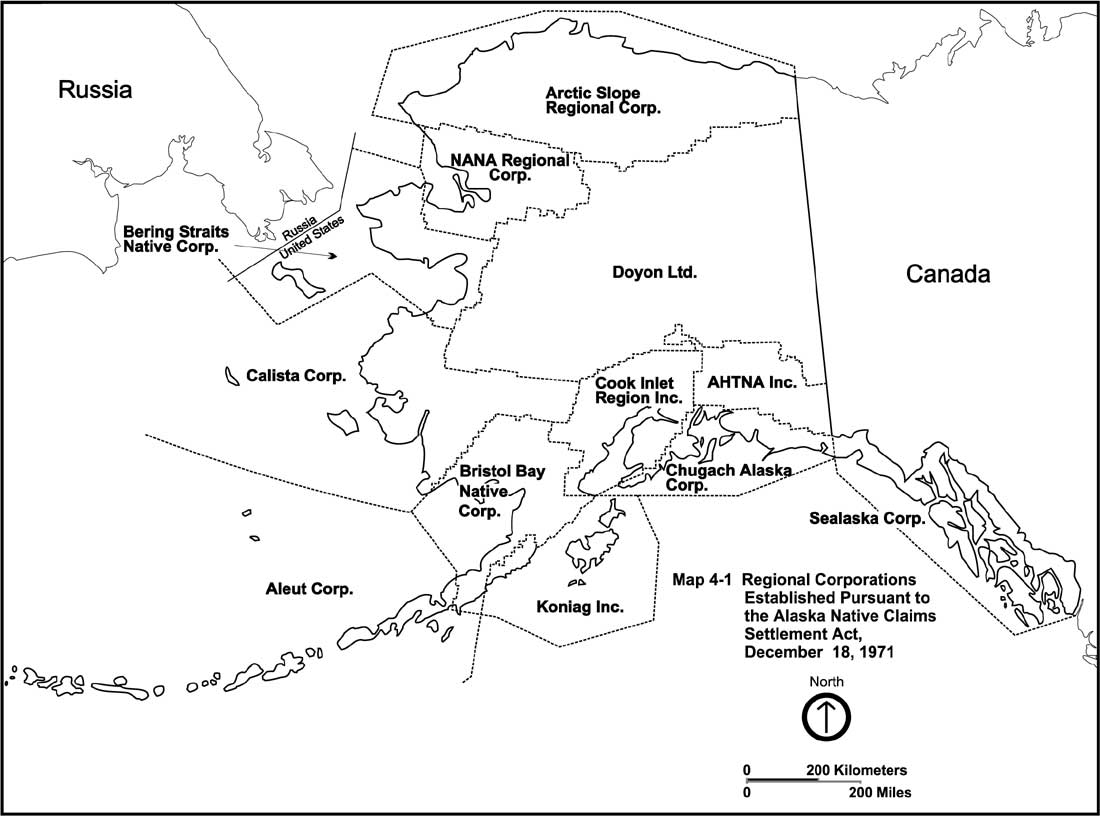
Regional corporations established by the Alaska Native Claims Settlement Act.

The thirteen regional corporations created under ANCSA are:

#	Abbreviation	ANCSA Native association	Alaska Native regional corporation	ANCSA villages
1	ASRC	Arctic Slope Native Association	Arctic Slope Regional Corporation	Utqiaġvik, Point Hope, Point Lay, Wainwright, Atqasuk, Nuiqsut, Kaktovik, Anaktuvuk Pass
2	BSNC	Bering Straits Association	Bering Straits Native Corporation	Seward Peninsula, Unalakleet
3	NANA	Northwest Alaska Native Association	NANA Regional Corporation	Kotzebue
4	AVCP	Association of Village Council Presidents	Calista Corporation	Southwest coast, all villages in the Bethel area, including all villages on the Lower Yukon River and the Lower Kuskokwim River
5	DOYON	Tanana Chiefs' Conference	Doyon, Limited	Koyukuk, Middle and Upper Yukon Rivers, Upper Kuskokwim, Tanana River
6	CIRI	Cook Inlet Association	Cook Inlet Region, Inc.	Kenai, Tyonek, Eklutna, Iliamna
7	BBNC	Bristol Bay Native Association	Bristol Bay Native Corporation	Dillingham, upper Alaska Peninsula
8	TAC	Aleutian Pribilof Islands Association, Inc. formerly the Aleut League	The Aleut Corporation	Aleutian Islands, Pribilof Islands and that part of the Alaska Peninsula which is in the Aleut League
9	CAC	Chugach Native Association	Chugach Alaska Corporation	Cordova, Tatitlek, Port Graham, English Bay, Valdez, and Seward
10	SEAC	Tlingit-Haida Central Council	Sealaska Corporation	Southeastern Alaska, including Metlakatla
11	KANA	Kodiak Area Native Association	Koniag, Incorporated	All villages on and around Kodiak Island
12	AHTNA	Copper River Native Association	Ahtna, Incorporated	Copper Center, Glennallen, Chitina, Mentasta
13		Regional Corporation for thirteenth region	The 13th Regional Corporation	Non-resident Alaska Native

== Alaska Native village corporations ==
There are over 200 village corporations, corresponding to the list of villages published in the text of ANCSA. Most corporations serve a single village, although some smaller villages have consolidated their corporations over the years.

Village corporation	Community	Regional corporation	Website
Afognak Native Corporation	Afognak	Koniag, Incorporated	afognak.com
Afognak Native Corporation	Port Lions	Koniag, Incorporated	afognak.com
Akhiok-Kaguyak, Inc.	Akhiok	Koniag, Incorporated	aki-kodiak.com
Akhiok-Kaguyak, Inc.	Kaguyak	Koniag, Incorporated	aki-kodiak.com
Akiachak Limited	Akiachak	Calista Corporation	
Akuliuk Inc.	Selawik	NANA Regional Corporation	
Akutan Corporation	Akutan	Aleut Corporation	
Alakanuk Corporation	Alakanuk	Calista Corporation	
Alaska Peninsula Corporation	Kokhanok	Bristol Bay Native Corporation	alaskapeninsulacorp.com
Alaska Peninsula Corporation	Newhalen	Bristol Bay Native Corporation	alaskapeninsulacorp.com
Alaska Peninsula Corporation	Port Heiden	Bristol Bay Native Corporation	alaskapeninsulacorp.com
Alaska Peninsula Corporation	South Naknek	Bristol Bay Native Corporation	alaskapeninsulacorp.com
Alaska Peninsula Corporation	Ugashik	Bristol Bay Native Corporation	alaskapeninsulacorp.com
Aleknagik Natives Limited	Aleknagik	Bristol Bay Native Corporation	
Alexander Creek Inc.	Alexander Creek	Cook Inlet Region, Incorporated	
Anton Larsen Inc.	Anton Larsen Bay	Koniag, Incorporated	
Arvig Inc.	Platinum	Calista Corporation	
Askinuk Corporation	Scammon Bay	Calista Corporation	
Atkasook Corporation	Atqasuk	Arctic Slope Regional Corp.	
Atmauthluak Limited	Atmautluak	Calista Corporation	
Atxam Corporation	Atka	Aleut Corporation	
Ayakulik Inc.	Ayakulik	Koniag, Incorporated	
Azachorok Inc.	Mountain Village	Calista Corporation	
Baan-o-yeel kon Corporation	Rampart	Doyon, Limited	
Bay View Inc.	Ivanof Bay	Bristol Bay Native Corporation	
Bean Ridge Corporation	Manley Hot Springs	Doyon, Limited	
Beaver Kwit'Chin Corporation	Beaver	Doyon, Limited	
Becharof Corporation	Egegik	Bristol Bay Native Corporation	
Belkofski Corporation	Belkofski	Aleut Corporation	
Bells Flats Native Group Inc.	Bells Flats	Koniag, Incorporated	
Bethel Native Corporation	Bethel	Calista Corporation	bnc-alaska.com
Brevig Mission Native Corporation	Brevig Mission	Bering Straits Native Corp.	
Buckland Nunachiak Corporation	Buckland	NANA Regional Corporation	
Cape Fox Corporation	Saxman	Sealaska Corporation	capefoxcorp.com
Caswell Native Assoc. Inc.	Caswell	Cook Inlet Region, Incorporated	
Chalkyitsik Native Corporation	Chalkyitsik	Doyon, Limited	
Chaluka Corporation	Nikolski	Aleut Corporation	
Chefarnrmute Inc.	Chefornak (Chefornakes Slough)	Calista Corporation	
Chenega Corporation	Chenega	Chugach Alaska Corporation	chenega.com
Chevak Co	Chevak	Calista Corporation	
Chignik River Limited	Chignik Lake	Bristol Bay Native Corporation	
Chignik Lagoon Native Corporation	Chignik	Bristol Bay Native Corporation	
Chickaloon Moose Creek Native Assoc.	Chickaloon	Cook Inlet Region, Incorporated	
Chitina Native Corporation	Chitina	Ahtna, Incorporated	
Choggiung Limited	Dillingham	Bristol Bay Native Corporation	
Chugach Natives Inc.	Icy Bay	Chugach Alaska Corporation	
Chuloonawick Corporation	Chuloonawick	Calista Corporation	
Council Native Corporation	Council	Bering Straits Native Corp.	
Cully Corporation	Point Lay	Arctic Slope Regional Corp.	cullycorp.com
Danzhit Hanlaii Corporation	Circle	Doyon, Limited	
Deacons Landing Inc.	Deacons Landing	Doyon, Limited	
Deering Ipnatchiak Corporation	Deering	NANA Regional Corporation	
Deloycheet Inc.	Holy Cross	Doyon, Limited	deloycheet.com
Dineega Corporation	Ruby	Doyon, Limited	
Dinyea Corporation	Stevens Village	Doyon, Limited	
Doratoi Inc.	Flat	Doyon, Limited	
Dot Lake Native Corporation	Dot Lake	Doyon, Limited	
Eklutna Inc.	Eklutna	Cook Inlet Region, Incorporated	eklutnainc.com
Ekuk Native Limited	Ekuk	Bristol Bay Native Corporation	
Ekwok Natives Limited	Ekwok	Bristol Bay Native Corporation	
Elim Native Corporation	Elim (Elim Reserve)	Bering Straits Native Corp.	
Elim Native Corporation	St. Lawrence	Bering Straits Native Corp.	
Emmonak Corporation	Emmonak	Calista Corporation	
English Bay Corporation	Nanwalek (English Bay)	Chugach Alaska Corporation	
Evansville Inc.	Evansville	Doyon, Limited	
The Eyak Corporation	Cordova	Chugach Alaska Corporation	eyakcorporation.com
Far West Inc.	Chignik Bay	Bristol Bay Native Corporation	
Forty-Mile Inc.	Chicken	Doyon, Limited	
Gakona Corporation	Gakona	Ahtna, Incorporated	
Gana-a'yoo Limited	Galena	Doyon, Limited	ganaayoo.com
Gana-a'yoo Limited	Kaltag	Doyon, Limited	ganaayoo.com
Gana-a'yoo Limited	Koyukuk	Doyon, Limited	ganaayoo.com
Gana-a'yoo Limited	Nulato	Doyon, Limited	ganaayoo.com
Ganawas Corporation	Knight Island	Sealaska Corporation	
Gold Creek-Susitna Native Association	Gold Creek	Calista Corporation	
Gold Creek-Susitna Native Association	Susitna	Calista Corporation	
Goldbelt Inc.	Juneau (4 cities)	Sealaska Corporation	goldbelt.com
Golovin Native Corporation	Golovin	Cook Inlet Region, Incorporated	
Grouse Creek Corporation	Grouse Creek	Doyon, Limited	
Gwitchyaazhee Corporation	Fort Yukon	Doyon, Limited	
Haida Corporation	Hydaburg	Sealaska Corporation	haidacorporation.com
Haycock Native Group Corporation	Haycock	Calista Corporation	
Hee-yea Lingde Corporation	Grayling	Doyon, Limited	
Huna Totem Corporation	Hoonah	Sealaska Corporation	
Hungwitchin Corporation	Eagle	Doyon, Limited	
Igiugig Native Corporation	Igiugig	Bristol Bay Native Corporation	
Iliamna Native Corporation	Iliamna	Bristol Bay Native Corporation	
Inalik Native Corporation	Diomede	Bering Straits Native Corp.	
Ingalik Inc.	Anvik	Doyon, Limited	
Iqfijouq Co	Eek	Calista Corporation	
Isanotski Corporation	False Pass	Aleut Corporation	web.archive.org/web/20100813124630/http://isanotski.alaska.com
Isingnakmeut	Shungnak	NANA Regional Corporation	
Ivaisaapaagmit Corporation	Ambler	NANA Regional Corporation	
Kake Tribal Corporation	Kake	Sealaska Corporation	kaketribalcorporation.com
Kaktovik Inupiat Corporation	Kaktovik	Arctic Slope Regional Corp.	
Karluk Native Corporation	Karluk	Koniag, Incorporated	
Kasigluk Inc.	Kasigluk	Calista Corporation	
Katyaak Corporation	Kiana	NANA Regional Corporation	
Kavilco Inc.	Kassan	Sealaska Corporation	kavilco.com
Kenai Native Association, Inc.	Kenai	Cook Inlet Region, Incorporated	
Kian Tr'ee Corporation	Canyon Village	Doyon, Limited	
Kikiktagruk Inupiat Corporation	Kotzebue	NANA Regional Corporation	kikiktagruk.com
King Cove Corporation	King Cove	Aleut Corporation	
King Island Native Corporation	King Island	Bering Straits Native Corp.	
Kiutsarak Inc.	Goodnews Bay	Calista Corporation	
Kivalina Sinnigaakmiut	Kivalina	NANA Regional Corporation	
Klawaock Heenya Corporation	Klawock	Sealaska Corporation	
Klukwan, Inc.	Klukwan	Sealaska Corporation	klukwan.com
Kluti-Kaah Corporation	Copper Center	Ahtna, Incorporated	
Knikatnu Inc.	Knik	Cook Inlet Region, Incorporated	
Kokarmiut Corporation	Akiak	Calista Corporation	
Kokrines Inc.	Kokrines	Doyon, Limited	
Koliganek Natives Limited	Koliganek	Bristol Bay Native Corporation	
Kongnikilnomuit Yuita Corporation	Bill Moores Slough	Calista Corporation	
Kootznoowoo Inc.	Angoon	Sealaska Corporation	kootznoowoo.com
Kukulget, Inc.	Savoonga	Bering Straits Native Corp.	
Koovukmeut Inc.	Kobuk	NANA Regional Corporation	
Kotlik Yupik Corporation	Kotlik	Calista Corporation	
K'oyitl'ots'ina Limited	Hughes	Doyon, Limited	
K'oyitl'ots'ina Limited	Huslia	Doyon, Limited	
K'oyitl'ots'ina Limited	Alatna	Doyon, Limited	
K'oyitl'ots'ina Limited	Allakaket	Doyon, Limited	
Koyuk Native Corporation	Koyuk	Bering Straits Native Corp.	
Kugkaktilk Limited	Kipnuk	Calista Corporation	
Kuskokwim Corporation	Aniak	Calista Corporation	kuskokwim.com
Kuskokwim Corporation	Chuathbaluk	Calista Corporation	kuskokwim.com
Kuskokwim Corporation	Crooked Creek	Calista Corporation	kuskokwim.com
Kuskokwim Corporation	Georgetown	Doyon, Limited	kuskokwim.com
Kuskokwim Corporation	Lower Kalskag	Calista Corporation	kuskokwim.com
Kuskokwim Corporation	Upper Kalskag	Calista Corporation	kuskokwim.com
Kuskokwim Corporation	Napaimute	Calista Corporation	kuskokwim.com
Kuskokwim Corporation	Red Devil	Calista Corporation	kuskokwim.com
Kuskokwim Corporation	Sleetmute	Calista Corporation	kuskokwim.com
Kuskokwim Corporation	Stony River	Calista Corporation	kuskokwim.com
Kuukpik Corporation, Inc.	Nuiqsut	Arctic Slope Regional Corp.	kuukpik.com
Kwethluk Inc.	Kwethluk	Calista Corporation	
Kwik Inc.	Kwigillingok	Calista Corporation	
Leisnoi, Inc.	Woody Island	Koniag, Incorporated	
Levelock Natives Limited	Levelock	Bristol Bay Native Corporation	
Lime Village Co	Lime Village	Calista Corporation	
Litnik Inc.	Litnik	Koniag, Incorporated	
Little Lake Louise Inc.	Little Lake Louise	Ahtna, Incorporated	
Lower Tonsina Inc.	Lower Tonsina	Ahtna, Incorporated	
Manokotak Natives Limited	Manokotak	Bristol Bay Native Corporation	
Mary's Igloo Native Corporation	Mary's Igloo	Bering Straits Native Corp.	
Maserculig Inc.	Marshall	Calista Corporation	
Medfra Native Council Inc.	Medfra	Doyon, Limited	
Mendas Cha-ag Native Corporation	Healy Lake	Doyon, Limited	
Mentasta Inc.	Mentasta Lake	Ahtna, Incorporated	
Minchumina Natives Inc.	Minchumina	Doyon, Limited	
Montana Creek Native Association	Montana Creek	Cook Inlet Region, Incorporated	
MTNT Limited	McGrath	Doyon, Limited	
MTNT Limited	Nikolai	Doyon, Limited	
MTNT Limited	Takotna	Doyon, Limited	
MTNT Limited	Telida	Doyon, Limited	
Nagamut Limited	Nagamut	Calista Corporation	
Napakiak Corporation	Napakiak	Calista Corporation	
Napaskiak Inc.	Napaskiak	Calista Corporation	
Native of Kodiak Inc.	Kodiak	Koniag, Incorporated	
Nebesna Native Group Inc.	Nebesna	Ahtna, Incorporated	
Neechootaalichaagat Corporation	Birch Creek	Doyon, Limited	
Neechootaalichaagat Corporation	Kantishna	Doyon, Limited	
Nelson Lagoon Corporation	Nelson Lagoon	Aleut Corporation	
Nerklikmute Native Corporation	Andereafsky	Calista Corporation	
Newtok Inc.	Newtok	Calista Corporation	
NGTA Inc.	Nightmute	Calista Corporation	
Nima Corporation	Mekoryuk	Calista Corporation	
Nima Corporation	Nunivak	Calista Corporation	
Ninilchik Natives Association, Inc.	Ninilchik	Cook Inlet Region, Incorporated	
Noatak Napaaktukmeur Corporation	Noatak	NANA Regional Corporation	
Kijik Corporation	Nondalton	Bristol Bay Native Corporation	
Northway Natives Inc.	Northway	Doyon, Limited	
Nu-Nachk Pit Inc.	Larsen Bay	Koniag, Incorporated	
Nunakauiak Yupik Corporation	Toksook Bay	Calista Corporation	
Nunamiut Corporation	Anaktuvuk Pass	Arctic Slope Regional Corp.	
Nunapiglluraq Corporation	Hamilton	Calista Corporation	
Nunapitchuk Limited	Nunapitchuk	Calista Corporation	
Oceanside Corporation	Perryville	Bristol Bay Native Corporation	
Ohgsenskale Corporation	Portage Creek	Bristol Bay Native Corporation	
Ohog Inc.	Ohogamiut	Calista Corporation	
Old Harbor Native Corporation	Old Harbor	Koniag, Incorporated	koniag.com
Olgoonik Corporation, Inc.	Wainwright	Arctic Slope Regional Corp.	olgoonik.com
Olsonville Inc.	Olsonville	Bristol Bay Native Corporation	
Oscarville Native Corporation	Oscarville	Calista Corporation	
Ounalashka Corporation	Unalaska	Aleut Corporation	ounalashka.com
Ouzinkie Native Corporation	Ouzinkie	Koniag, Incorporated	ouzinkienativecorporation.com
Paimiut Corporation	Paimiut	Calista Corporation	
Paug-Vik Inc. Limited	Naknek	Bristol Bay Native Corporation	
Pedro Bay Corporation	Pedro Bay	Bristol Bay Native Corporation	
Pilot Point Native Corporation	Pilot Point	Bristol Bay Native Corporation	
Pilot Station Native Corporation	Pilot Station	Calista Corporation	
Pitkas Point Native Corporation	Pitkas Point	Calista Corporation	
Point Possession Inc.	Point Possession	Cook Inlet Region, Incorporated	
Port Graham Corporation	Port Graham	Chugach Alaska Corporation	
Putoo Corporation	Noorvik	NANA Regional Corporation	
Qanirtuuq Inc.	Quinhagak	Calista Corporation	
Qemirtalek Coast Corporation	Kongiganek	Calista Corporation	
Saguyak Inc.	Clarks Point	Bristol Bay Native Corporation	
St. George Tanadax Corporation	St. George	Aleut Corporation	
St. Marys Native Corporation	St. Marys	Calista Corporation	
St. Michael native Corporation	St. Michaels	Bering Straits Native Corp.	
Salamatoff Native Association Inc.	Salamatoff	Cook Inlet Region, Incorporated	salamatof.com
Sanak Corporation	Pauloff Harbor	Aleut Corporation	
Savonski Corporation	Savonski	Bristol Bay Native Corporation	
Sea Lion Corporation	Hooper Bay	Calista Corporation	
Seldovia Native Association Inc.	Seldovia	Cook Inlet Region, Incorporated	snai.com
Seth-do-ya-ah Corporation	Minto	Doyon, Limited	
Shaan-Seet Inc.	Craig	Sealaska Corporation	shaanseet.com
Shaktoolik Native Corporation	Shaktoolik	Bering Straits Native Corp.	
Shee Atiká, Inc.	Sitka	Sealaska Corporation	sheeatika.com
Shishmaref Native Corporation	Shishmaref	Bering Straits Native Corp.	
Shumagin Corporation	Sand Point	Aleut Corporation	shumagin.com
Shuyak Inc.	Port William	Koniag, Incorporated	
Sitnasuak Native Corporation	Nome	Bering Straits Native Corp.	snc.org
Slana Native Corporation	Slana	Ahtna, Incorporated	
Solomon Native Corporation	Solomon	Bering Straits Native Corp.	
Sta-Keh Corporation	Gulkana	Chugach Alaska Corporation	
Stebbins Native Corporation	Stebbins	Bering Straits Native Corp.	
Stuyahok Limited	New Stuyahok	Bristol Bay Native Corporation	
Swan Lake Corporation	Sheldon Point	Calista Corporation	
Talzina Inc.	Tazlina	Ahtna, Incorporated	
Tanacross Inc.	Tanacross	Doyon, Limited	
Tanadgusik Corporation	St. Paul	Aleut Corporation	
Tanalian Inc.	Port Alsworth	Bristol Bay Native Corporation	
Tatitlek Corporation	Tatitlek	Chugach Alaska Corporation	
Teller Native Corporation	Teller	Bering Straits Native Corp.	
Tetlin Indian Reservation	Tetlin	Doyon, Limited	
Tikigaq Corporation	Point Hope	Arctic Slope Regional Corp.	
Tihteet'aii Inc.	Birch Creek	Doyon, Limited	
Toghotthele Corporation	Nenana	Doyon, Limited	
Togiak Natives Limited	Togiak	Bristol Bay Native Corporation	
Tozitna Limited	Tanana	Doyon, Limited	
Tulkisarmute Inc.	Tuluksak	Calista Corporation	
Tuntutuliak Land Limited	Tuntutuliak	Calista Corporation	
Tununrmiut Rinit Corporation	Tununak	Calista Corporation	
Twin Hills Native Corporation	Twin Hills	Bristol Bay Native Corporation	
Twin Lake Native Group Inc.	Twin Lake	Ahtna, Incorporated	
Tyonek Native Corporation	Tyonek	Cook Inlet Region, Incorporated	
Uganik Natives, Inc.	Uganik	Koniag, Incorporated	
Ukpeaġvik Iñupiat Corporation	Utqiaġvik	Arctic Slope Regional Corp.	ukpik.com
Umkumiute Limited	Umkumiute	Calista Corporation	
Unalakleet Native Corporation	Unalakleet	Bering Straits Native Corp.	
Unga Corporation	Unga	Aleut Corporation	
Uyak, Inc.	Uyak	Koniag, Incorporated	
Venetie Indian Reservation	Venetie	Doyon, Limited	
Wales Native Corporation	Wales	Bering Straits Native Corp.	
White Mountain Native Corporation	White Mountain	Bering Straits Native Corp.	
Wisenak Inc.	Wisenak	Doyon, Limited	
Yak-tat Kwaan Inc.	Yakutat	Sealaska Corporation	yak-tatkwaan.com
Yedetena Na Corporation	Cantwell	Ahtna, Incorporated	
Yedetena Na Corporation	Chistochina	Ahtna, Incorporated	
Zho-Tse, Inc.	Shageluk	Doyon, Limited	

Afognak Native Corporation

The Afognak Native Corporation was organized in 1977 through the merger of two ANCSA village corporations: Port Lions Native Corporation and Natives of Afognak, Inc. It is governed by a nine-member board of directors. Afognak Native Corporation has many business interests. For 18 years it participated in and profited from timber development ventures on Afogank Island. It operates a number of successful subsidiaries including leasing, bioenergy operations and oil field services. In the late 1990s, the Afognak Native Corporation launched a government contracting business. The Afognak Native Corporation is a wealthy corporation and was listed in the Top 100 Contractors of the Federal Government in 2010. Coming in at No. 79, The Afognak Native Corporation's contracts were $749,557,576.49. Afognak Native Corporation entities also received NASA Small Business Contractor of the Year Award in 2013. The Corporation's profile is listed as "Construction and Engineering" services. The Afognak Native Corporation has approximately 900 shareholders and pays over $12 million in dividends annually. The Afognak Native Corporation controls over 160,000 acres of land in the Kodiak Archipelago and the lands form the core of financial success of the corporation.

== Subsequent legislation and litigation ==
The federal Indian Self-Determination and Education Assistance Act of 1975 (ISDA) gave self-autonomy to both Native Indian tribal governments and to ANCs.

In the wake of the COVID-19 pandemic, the CARES Act set aside about $8 billion in funds for federally-recognized "tribal governments". The U.S. Treasury Department earmarked about $500 million of those funds for ANCs. While the federal government had generally recognized that ANCs fell under "tribal governments" since the passage of the ISDA, three Native Indian tribes from the lower 48 states sued the Treasury, asserting that the ANCs were not federally-recognized "tribal governments" under a statutory interpretation of the law. That led to the United States Supreme Court case, Yellen v. Confederated Tribes of the Chehalis Reservation, which was decided in June 2021 that under ISDA, the ANCs were federally-recognized "tribal governments" and thus qualified for CARES funds.

== Financial performance ==
Financial performance of each ANRC in 2016
#	Abbreviation	ANCSA	Alaska Native Regional Corporation	2016 annual revenue	Approximate no. of shareholders
1	ASRC	Arctic Slope Native Association	Arctic Slope Regional Corporation	$2,370,000,000	13,000
2	BSNC	Bering Straits Association	Bering Straits Native Corporation	$326,000,000	7,500
3	NANA	Northwest Alaska Native Association	NANA Regional Corporation	$1,300,000,000	
4	AVCP	Association of Village Council Presidents	Calista Corporation	$492,000,000	13,000
5	DOYON	Tanana Chiefs' Conference	Doyon, Limited	$305,410,000	19,000
6	CIRI	Cook Inlet Association	Cook Inlet Region, Inc.	$289,000,000	
7	BBNC	Bristol Bay Native Association	Bristol Bay Native Corporation	$1,510,000,000	10,350
8	TAC	Aleut League	The Aleut Corporation	$171,660,000	3,900
9	CAC	Chugach Native Association	Chugach Alaska Corporation	$842,400,000	2,600
10	SEAC	Sealaska Corporation	Sealaska Corporation	$145,510,000	23,000
11	KANA	Kodiak Area Native Association	Koniag, Incorporated	$252,000,000	3,850
12	AHTNA	Copper River Native Association	Ahtna, Incorporated	$218,000,000	1,900
13		Regional Corporation for Thirteenth Region		Insolvent	

== See also ==
Compare:

- Makivik Corporation, an Inuit-owned company in Nunavik, Quebec created by a land claims agreement
- Nunatsiavut, an autonomous Inuit Land Claims Area in Newfoundland and Labrador
- Emil Notti, key developer of ANCSA
