= The Aleut Corporation =

Alaska Native Regional Corporation

The Aleut Corporation, or Aleut, is one of twelve Alaska Native Regional Corporations created under the Alaska Native Claims Settlement Act of 1971 (ANCSA) in settlement of aboriginal land claims. The Aleut Corporation was incorporated in Alaska on June 21, 1972. Headquartered in Anchorage, Alaska, The Aleut Corporation is a for-profit corporation with over 5,000 Alaska Native shareholders, primarily of Aleut descent originating in the Alaska Peninsula, Aleutian Islands, Pribilof Islands, and Shumagin Islands of Alaska.

Under ANCSA, The Aleut Corporation received a settlement of $19.5 million. Its land entitlement included 66,000 acres (270 km^{2}) of surface lands and 1.572 million acres (6,362 km^{2}) of subsurface estate.

== Officers and directors ==
A current listing of The Aleut Corporations' officers and directors, as well as documents filed with the State of Alaska since Aleut's incorporation, are available online through the Corporations Database of the Division of Corporations, Business & Professional Licensing, Alaska Department of Commerce, Community and Economic Development. Leadership is also listed on aleutcorp.com.

== Shareholders ==
At incorporation, The Aleut Corporation enrolled 3,249 Alaska Native shareholders, each of whom received 100 shares of Aleut stock. As an ANCSA corporation, Aleut has no publicly traded stock and its shares cannot legally be sold.

== Lands ==
Under ANCSA, The Aleut Corporation was entitled to 66,000 acres (270 km^{2}) of surface lands and 1.572 million acres (6,362 km^{2}) of subsurface estate. Most of Aleut's land selections were made on the Alaska Peninsula and in the Aleutian Islands, Shumagin Islands, and Pribilof Islands.

== Enterprises ==
Aleut's primary business areas are in the areas of government contracting, telecommunications, environmental remediation, real estate management, sales of sand, gravel, mineral, and rock aggregates, and investments in oil and gas producing properties and marketable securities. Under federal law, The Aleut Corporation and its majority-owned subsidiaries, joint ventures and partnerships are deemed to be "minority and economically disadvantaged business enterprise[s]". This family of businesses is exempt from the Civil Rights Act of 1964, meaning their employment policies are allowed to be discriminatory.(43 USC 1626(e)).

Company	Headquarters	Type of subsidiary	Enterprises
Aleut Ventures	Anchorage, AK	Wholly owned	Fuel and commercial and residential properties, chiefly in Adak and Cold Bay, Alaska
Aleut Energy	Anchorage, AK	Wholly owned	Energy-focused businesses, providing high-quality customer service through innovative and sustainable solutions
Aleut Federal	Reston, VA	Wholly owned	Federal services, offering a portfolio of subsidiaries certified by the Small Business Administration as 8(a), small disadvantaged, and/or small business
Aleut Real Estate	Anchorage, AK	Wholly owned	Acquisition, management, and development of high-quality commercial properties that generate long-term value for its investors and the communities it serves
Aleut Mechanical	Fairbanks, AK	Wholly owned	Mechanical contracting firms with an extensive background in the design-build and negotiated work arena
Strata-G Solutions	Huntsville, AL	Wholly owned	High-quality engineering product solutions and technical solutions
