= Ahtna, Incorporated =

Alaska Native Regional Corporation

Ahtna, Incorporated is one of thirteen Alaska Native Regional Corporations created under the Alaska Native Claims Settlement Act of 1971 (ANCSA) in settlement of aboriginal land claims. Ahtna, Incorporated was incorporated in Alaska on June 23, 1972. Headquartered in Glennallen, Alaska, Ahtna is a for-profit corporation with more than 2,000 Alaska Native shareholders primarily of Ahtna Athabascan descent.

Ahtna, Inc. stewards over 1,500,000 acres (6,100 km^{2}) of lands granted through land claims under ANCSA finalized between 1971 and 1998. The Ahtna region is located primarily in the Copper River Census Area of Alaska, with a small spillover into the neighboring Denali Borough in the area of Cantwell. Ahtna's total entitlement under ANCSA is 1,770,000 acres (7,160 km^{2}).

== Officers and Directors ==
A current listing of Ahtna, Inc.'s officers and directors, as well as documents filed with the State of Alaska since Ahtna's incorporation, are available online through the Corporations Database of the Division of Corporations, Business & Professional Licensing, Alaska Department of Commerce, Community and Economic Development.

== Shareholders ==
At incorporation, Ahtna enrolled approximately 1,000 Alaska Natives, each of whom received 100 shares of Ahtna stock. As an ANCSA corporation, Ahtna has no publicly traded stock and its shares cannot legally be sold.

The corporation has over 2,000 shareholders, all of whom are Alaska Natives.

== Lands ==
Ahtna's total entitlement under ANCSA is 1,770,000 acres (7,160 km^{2}), including regional and village entitlements.

Eight villages are contained within the Ahtna region, including Cantwell, Chistochina, Chitina, Gakona, Gulkana, Mentasta, the Native Village of Kluti-Kaah (Copper Center), and Tazlina. Under the terms of ANCSA, 714,240 acres (2,890 km^{2}) of land surrounding the villages were allocated to the village corporations established for those villages. Ahtna, Inc. received bonus selections of about 45,000 acres (182 km^{2}) for distribution among the eight villages based upon historic use and subsistence needs.

In 1980, seven of the eight village corporations in the Ahtna region merged with Ahtna. These included the village corporations Yedatene Na Corporation (Cantwell), Cheesh-Na, Incorporated (Chistochina), Gakona Corporation (Gakona), Sta-Keh Corporation (Gulkana), Kluti-Kaah Corporation (Kluti-Kaah in Copper Center), Mentasta, Incorporated (Mentasta), and Tazlina, Incorporated (Tazlina). Ahtna assumed management of the lands of the seven merged corporations; however, under terms of the merger agreement, the former village corporations were permitted to maintain shareholder committees known as Successor Village Organizations (SVO) each of which retains the right to reasonably withhold consent to new development of former village lands.

Chitina Native Corporation (in Chitina) chose not to merge with Ahtna, and retains rights to the surface estate of its lands. Rights to the subsurface estate of its lands are with Ahtna, Inc., per the requirements of ANCSA.

- Surface estate (including gravel), timber, and subsurface estate is managed by the Ahtna, Inc. Land Department.

== Business enterprises ==
Ahtna Netiye', LLC, the holding company of Ahtna, Inc. manages the operating subsidiaries, all of which are wholly owned. These subsidiary companies are involved in a number of corporate activities, including civil and vertical construction, environmental remediation, facilities management and support services, government contracting, and oil and gas pipeline maintenance and construction. Ahtna Netiye', LLC is headquartered in Anchorage, Alaska.

Under federal law, Ahtna and its majority-owned subsidiaries, joint ventures and partnerships are deemed to be a "minority and economically disadvantaged business enterprise[s]" (43 USC 1626(e)).

Company	Headquarters	Enterprises
A.A.A. Valley Gravel	Palmer, Alaska	Sand and gravel mining, trucking, and asphalt operations.
Ahtna Construction & Primary Products Corporation (AC&PPC)	Anchorage, Alaska	Oil spill response; subcontractor with Alyeska Pipeline Service Company; general construction and electrical/mechanical services.
Ahtna Design-Build, Inc. (ADB)	Irvine, California	Infrastructure design-build opportunities, general construction, and environmental remediation.
Ahtna Development Corporation (ADC)	Glennallen, Alaska	Operations and maintenance (O&M), specializing in facilities management.
Ahtna Engineering Services, LLC (AES)	Anchorage, Alaska	Government contracting, operations and maintenance (O&M), architectural and engineering, construction, and professional services.
Ahtna Environmental, Inc. (AEI)	Anchorage, Alaska	Environmental remediation.
Ahtna Global, LLC (AGL)	Anchorage, Alaska	Construction and environmental services; ICE detention facility operations.
Ahtna Facility Services, Inc. (AFSI)	Anchorage, Alaska	Operations and maintenance (O&M), logistics, and support services.
Ahtna Government Services Corporation (AGSC)	West Sacramento, California	Government contractor in environmental engineering and demolition, general contracting, and professional services.
Ahtna Logistics, LLC (ALL)	Anchorage, Alaska	Logistics services.
Ahtna Professional Services, Inc. (APSI)	Anchorage, Alaska	Security services.
Ahtna Support and Training Services, LLC. (ASTS)	Anchorage, Alaska	Simulations/facilities operations and maintenance, training range operations, and instrumentation.
Ahtna Technical Services Incorporated (ATSI)	Anchorage, Alaska	Facility operations and maintenance; shared services.
Ahtna Technologies, Inc. (ATI)	Anchorage, Alaska	Information technology services.
AKHI, LLC	Anchorage, Alaska	Base Operation Support; maintenance and logistics; administration, management and training; homeland security; information technology; and mission/operation support.

== See also ==
- Copper River Native Association Non-profit organization
- Ahtna Lands Information regarding lands Ahtna, Inc. received under ANCSA
