= Bristol Bay Native Corporation =

Alaska Native Regional Corporation

Bristol Bay Native Corporation, or BBNC, is one of thirteen Alaska Native Regional Corporations created under the Alaska Native Claims Settlement Act of 1971 (ANCSA) in settlement of aboriginal land claims. Bristol Bay Native Corporation was incorporated in Alaska on June 13, 1972. Headquartered in Anchorage, Alaska, Bristol Bay Native Corporation is a for-profit corporation with approximately 9,900 Alaska Native shareholders primarily of Eskimo, Aleut, and Denaʼina descent. BBNC states its mission as “Enriching Our Native Way Of Life" as a corporation "that protects the past, present and future of the Natives from Bristol Bay.” The region includes 25 village corporations, 31 communities, and 31 federally recognized tribes.

BBNC's strategic goals are to build the value of BBNC's assets by increasing profitability and financial strength; to pay predictable and increasing dividends to shareholders; to promote improved employment and educational opportunities for shareholders; to position BBNC to have a major voice in the economic development of the Bristol Bay region; and to endorse a “Fish First” policy for land and resource management.

== Officers and directors ==
BBNC is governed by a twelve-member shareholder elected Board of Directors, all of whom are BBNC shareholders. A current listing of Bristol Bay Native Corporation's officers and directors, as well as documents filed with the State of Alaska since BBNC's incorporation, are available online through the Corporations Database of the Division of Corporations, Business & Professional Licensing, Alaska Department of Commerce, Community and Economic Development.

== Shareholders ==
At incorporation, Bristol Bay Native Corporation enrolled 5,401 Alaska Native shareholders, each of whom received 100 shares of BBNC stock. In 2015, BBNC had about 9,900 shareholders. As an ANCSA corporation, BBNC has no publicly traded stock and its shares cannot legally be sold.

== BBNC Education Foundation ==
The BBNC Education Foundation is a nonprofit 501(c)(3), organized in the State of Alaska. Its mission is to support and encourage BBNC shareholders to pursue educational opportunities and to promote and preserve cultural heritage. The BBNC Education Foundation operates two main scholarship programs, the Higher Education/Vocational Education scholarship program and the Short-Term Vocational Education scholarship program.

Since 1986, the Foundation has awarded over 2,700 scholarships worth more than $3,500,000. Scholarship recipients have graduated with bachelor's, master's and other advanced degrees, such as a Ph.D. in anthropology, Doctorates of Medicine, Veterinary Medicine, and Law, and degrees in engineering, business administration, education, nursing, guidance counseling, environmental science, economics and philosophy.

Recognizing the value of certifications and training that enhance job skills, the BBNC Education Foundation also awards scholarships to help pay for short-term vocational training. These scholarships help shareholders achieve specialized certifications or training in order to enhance their employment or career opportunities.

== Lands ==
The Bristol Bay region encompasses of about 40 million acres (140,000 km^{2}), about the size of the state of Oklahoma. Of this, BBNC's land entitlement under ANCSA includes 101,500 acres (411 km^{2}) of surface estate and 2,716,000 acres (10,990 km^{2}) subsurface estate.

The Bristol Bay region is situated 150 miles southwest of Anchorage. The region's communities are geographically isolated from the rest of the state and in most cases from one another. Most of the communities in the Bristol Bay region are self-reliant, operating without the benefit of interconnected road and utility systems. The vast majority of households rely on subsistence fishing and hunting for a large percentage of their food. Today, 30 villages in Southwest Alaska are only accessible by air or water. The cost of fuel to heat homes ranges from $4–$10 per gallon.

Villages in the region are situated in the watersheds of the Bristol Bay salmon fishery, which provides all five species of Pacific salmon.

== "Fish First" policy ==
BBNC has adopted a "Fish First" policy and responsible development in its land management. The Fish First policy states that, 1) salmon is and always has been the principal means of subsistence for the cultures of the region and must be protected for that reason alone; 2) salmon contributes to the economic health of our state; 3) because Bristol Bay produces the world's largest wild sockeye salmon fishery, we have a global human and environmental responsibility to protect this stock.

The Fish First policy was adopted to protect the Bristol Bay region's fish and fish habitat for subsistence and traditional cultural uses. Many of the traditional customs of the Eskimo, Aleut and Indian people are still observed today. For the majority of residents living in Bristol Bay, the gathering of plants, fish and animals – subsistence – is an important source of providing Alaska Natives with food, in addition to providing for their economic and cultural wellbeing. Because the villages in the Bristol Bay region are so remote, accessible only by air or water, the goods and services in the region are expensive. Subsistence provides opportunities for food, fuel, clothing, handicrafts and more.

With worldwide interest in the 1,000-mile race to Nome, BBNC hopes its sponsorship of the Fish First Award will promote awareness of the pristine Bristol Bay region, its people and traditional cultures, as well as the region's contribution to fishing economies. BBNC has sponsored several initiatives to promote its Fish First ideals, including Day in Our Bay (a 15-minute video project) and The Bristol Bay Fish First Award (presented to the Iditarod Trail Sled Dog Race musher who first reaches Galena or Kaltag). The Fish First Award winner receives $1,000, plus 25 pounds of Bristol Bay salmon, a commemorative jacket and a supply of Bristol Bay canned salmon and smoked salmon strips.

== Business enterprises ==
BBNC has a portfolio of subsidiary companies specializing in five major business lines, which include oilfield and industrial services, petroleum distribution, government services, construction services and tourism. Employees receive health benefits and, to compensate for the extreme geographic remoteness of certain enterprises, employees also access Grand Rounds for remote clinical navigation and treatment decision support.

Bristol Bay Resource Solutions (BBRS) provides administrative services to BBNC and its subsidiaries, as well as to select outside clients. BBRS began operations in 2013.
