= Calista Corporation =

Alaska Native Regional Corporation

Calista Corporation (pronounced [tʃɑlɪstɑ]) is one of thirteen Alaska Native Regional Corporations created under the Alaska Native Claims Settlement Act of 1971 (ANCSA) in settlement of aboriginal land claims. Calista was incorporated in Alaska on June 12, 1972. Although the Calista region is in western Alaska, Calista Corporation is headquartered in Anchorage, Alaska. Calista is a for-profit corporation with over 38,100 Alaska Native shareholders primarily of Yup'ik descent.

The name Calista (worker) is a portmanteau of the Central Alaskan Yup'ik words cali-, meaning "to work," and -ista, meaning someone or something which does. The Yup'ik language does not have a word for "corporation".

As part of ANCSA, Calista received patent for 4,997,263 acres (20,223.21 km^{2}) from the federal government as well as approximately $80 million, making it the second largest corporation established under ANCSA. The Calista region covers Alaska's Bethel and Kusilvak census areas and includes 56 villages.

== Shareholders ==
Currently, Calista Corporation has over 38,100 shareholders, almost all of whom are Central Alaskan Yup'ik people, Cup'ik or Athabaskan, and most of whom still speak the Yup'ik and Cupꞌik languages and live a largely subsistence lifestyle of hunting, fishing, and gathering. At incorporation, Calista enrolled 13,303 Alaska Natives, each of whom received 100 shares of Calista stock. The total number of shareholders continues to grow due to open enrollment for descendants of original shareholders.

As an ANCSA corporation, Calista has no publicly traded stock and its shares cannot legally be sold. In 2017, after a historic vote by its Shareholders, Calista joined a small but growing number of ANCSA corporations that have opened enrollment to the descendants of its original Shareholders.

== Lands ==
Calista Corporation owns about 6.5 million acres (26,00 km^{2}) in southwestern Alaska on the Yukon–Kuskokwim Delta and the Kuskokwim Mountains. Most of this land is split estate where the village corporation owns the surface estate and Calista owns the subsurface. The region's 56 villages selected the bulk of these lands near their villages based primarily on subsistence needs. Calista's entitlement also includes 264,000264,000 acres (1,070 km^{2}) acres of fee estate lands where Calista owns both surface and subsurface rights. Much of the fee estate entitlement is prospective for precious metal mineral resources.

Because of the importance of the land to the traditional subsistence economies of the region's Yup'ik, Cup'ik, and Athabaskan residents, including the bulk of Calista's shareholders, Calista concentrated most of its land selections under ANCSA in areas surrounding the region's 56 villages.

In a land exchange with the federal government, finalized in 2001, some of Calista's surface land parcels and a portion of its subsurface estate were incorporated into the Yukon Delta National Wildlife Refuge, while preserving subsistence hunting and fishing rights.

Calista is land owner to subsurface rights from ANCSA, and holds title to the large Donlin Creek gold deposit, which is leased to Barrick Gold and NovaGold Resources.

== Business enterprises ==
Key Calista Corporation business industries include aerospace and defense, construction, cybersecurity and IT services, engineering, environmental services, heavy equipment sales and rental, facility support services, marine services, metrology services, moving and warehousing, oilfield services, real estate, rock and aggregate products.

Under federal law, Calista and some its majority-owned subsidiaries, joint ventures and partnerships are deemed to be "minority and economically disadvantaged business enterprise[s]" (43 USC 1626(e)).

=== Wholly owned subsidiaries ===
Calista Corporation's 30-plus subsidiaries involved in federal contracting, construction, engineering, oilfield services, equipment, real estate, and other services are organized in four holding lines:

Bektuq Holding, LLC

- Nordic-Calista, LLC
- Qagan Lands, LLC

Calista Brice, LLC

- Brice Inc.
- Brice Builders, LLC
- Brice Civil Constructors, Inc.
- Brice Construction & Design
- Brice Environmental
- Brice Engineering, LLC
- Brice Equipment
- Brice Marine
- Brice Solutions, LLC
- Browns Hill Quarry
- STG, Inc.
- STG Pacific, LLC
- Yukon Equipment, Inc.
- Tunista Construction, LLC

Ena Holding, LLC

- Aulukista, LLC
- Calista Real Estate, LLC
- Tunista, Inc.

Yulista Holding, LLC

- Demil Transport Services, LLC
- DSoft Technology
- Straitsys
- Troy7, Inc.
- Tunista Logistics Solutions, LLC
- Tunista Services, LLC
- Yulista Aerospace and Defense, LLC
- Yulista Aviation, Inc.
- Yulista Integrated Solutions, LLC
- Y-Tech Services, Inc.
- Yulista Services, LLC
- Yulista Solutions, LLC
- Yulista Tactical Services, LLC
- Yulista Support Services, LLC

=== Joint ventures ===
Calista owns joint ventures in:

- Delta EMI, LLC (25% owner of Delta Constructors, LLC)
- Redstone Defense Systems (51% owned by Yulista Aviation)
- Defense Systems and Solutions (51% owned by Yulista Integrated Solutions)
