= Bering Straits Native Corporation =

American resource development company

Bering Straits Native Corporation (BSNC) was formed in 1972 as the Alaska Native Claims Settlement Act (ANCSA) regional corporation for the Bering Straits and Norton Sound region. The corporation actively pursues responsible development of resources and other business opportunities. Through its subsidiaries, BSNC serves the federal government and commercial customers.

The corporation is headquartered in the city of Nome, Alaska, operates a business office in Anchorage, Alaska, and operates site locations in Alaska, across the United States and internationally.

The BSNC region is located in Northwest Alaska and is home to three culturally distinct people: Inupiat, Siberian Yupik and Central Yup’ik. BSNC is owned by more than 8,200 Alaska Native shareholders. BSNC owns and manages a subsurface estate of approximately 2.1 million acres (8,500 km^{2}), 145,728 acres (58,974 ha) of its own and the remainder selected by the region’s 17 village corporations.

== Officers and Directors ==
Position	Name
Chair	Robert Evans
President	Cindy Towarak Massie
Vice Chair	Roy Ashenfelter
Secretary	Becka Baker
Treasurer	Jason Evans
Assistant Secretary	Tyler Ivanoff
Assistant Treasurer	Louie Green, Jr.
Director	Roy Agloinga
Director	Ella A. Anagick
Director	Neal Foster
Director	Steve Ivanoff
Director	Gloria Ann Karum
Director	Silas Paniptchuk
Director	Gail R. Schubert
Director	Donald Stiles

== Shareholders and Descendants ==
Bering Straits Native Corporation is owned by more than 8,200 Alaska Native shareholders. These include original shareholders, heirs and gift recipients residing inside and outside Alaska. BSNC shareholders who are Alaska Native are eligible to vote for the Board of Directors or on other advisory matters that come to the shareholders for a vote at the Annual Meeting.

At incorporation, BSNC enrolled 6,333 Alaska Native shareholders, each of whom received 100 shares of BSNC stock. As an ANCSA corporation, BSNC has no publicly traded stock and its shares cannot legally be sold.

BSNC’s Shareholder Relations Department manages shareholder records, stocks, gifting of stock, stock wills and the MyBSNC portal. MyBSNC is an interactive special shareholder portal designed to provide BSNC shareholders information about their shareholder records.

The Shareholder Development Department works directly with shareholders and descendants to assist them in identifying and reaching educational and professional career goals. In addition, the department helps connect shareholders and descendants with employment opportunities within the BSNC family of companies. These programs include:

- Career Advancement and Resources
- Summer Internship Program
- Beringia Settlement Trust Scholarships
- Shareholder and Descendant Talent Bank
- Shareholder Owned Businesses Registry

== Lands ==
The BSNC region encompasses most of the Seward Peninsula and eastern Norton Sound in Alaska. BSNC's land entitlement under ANCSA includes over 2.1 million acres (8,900 km^{2}) of surface and/or subsurface estate in this region.

== Business enterprises ==
Under federal law, Bering Straits Native Corporation and its majority-owned subsidiaries, joint ventures and partnerships are deemed to be "minority and economically disadvantaged business enterprise[s]" (43 USC 1626(e)).
