= Chugach Alaska Corporation =

Alaska Native Regional Corporation

- Company type: Private
- Headquarters: Anchorage, Alaska, United States
- Divisions: Defense Base Services Inc. Wolf Creek Federal Services Inc. Chugach Information Technology Inc. Chugach Education Services Inc. Chugach Government Services Inc. Chugach Industries; Chugach Systems Integration LLC. Chugach Federal Solutions Inc. Chugach World Services Inc.
- Website: chugach.com

Chugach Alaska Corporation, or CAC, is one of thirteen Alaska Native Regional Corporations created under the Alaska Native Claims Settlement Act of 1971 (ANCSA) in settlement of aboriginal land claims. Chugach Alaska Corporation was incorporated in Alaska on June 23, 1972. Headquartered in Anchorage, Alaska, Chugach Alaska Corporation is a for-profit corporation with over 2,200 Alaska Native shareholders primarily of Chugach Alutiiq, Eyak, and Tlingit descent.

== Corporate structure and governance ==
=== Officers and directors ===
A current listing of Chugach Alaska Corporation's officers and directors, as well as documents filed with the State of Alaska since CAC's incorporation, are available online through the Corporations Database of the Division of Corporations, Business & Professional Licensing, Alaska Department of Commerce, Community and Economic Development.

=== Shareholders ===
At incorporation, Chugach Alaska Corporation enrolled about 2,000 Alaska Native shareholders, each of whom received 100 shares of CAC stock. CAC currently has about 2,200 shareholders. As an ANCSA corporation, Chugach Alaska Corporation has no publicly traded stock and its shares cannot legally be sold.

== Lands ==
The Chugach region encompasses about 10 million acres (40,000 km^{2}) in Prince William Sound and coastal areas of southcentral Alaska, including the southern coast of the Kenai Peninsula. Chugach Alaska Corporation's land entitlement under ANCSA includes about 378,000 acres (1,530 km^{2}) of both surface and subsurface estate and a further 550,000 acres (2,200 km^{2}) of subsurface estate, for a total of 928,000 acres (3,760 km^{2}). As of 2006, CAC has received about 94% of its total entitlement.

== Business enterprises ==
Under federal law, Chugach Alaska Corporation and its majority-owned subsidiaries, joint ventures and partnerships are deemed to be "minority and economically disadvantaged business enterprise[s]" (43 USC 1626(e)).

== History ==
The corporation filed for Chapter 11 bankruptcy protection in 1991 as a result of a fallout in the timber industry, a salmon glut, a fire at its Orca cannery, and the 1989 Exxon Valdez oil spill's impact on the local herring population. In 2003 Chugach ranked second in Alaska Business Monthly’s list of Top 49ers, a ranking of the top Alaskan-owned and operated businesses.
