= 2022 Alaska's at-large congressional district special election =

- August 16, 2022

Alaska's at-large congressional district
- Turnout: 32.2%
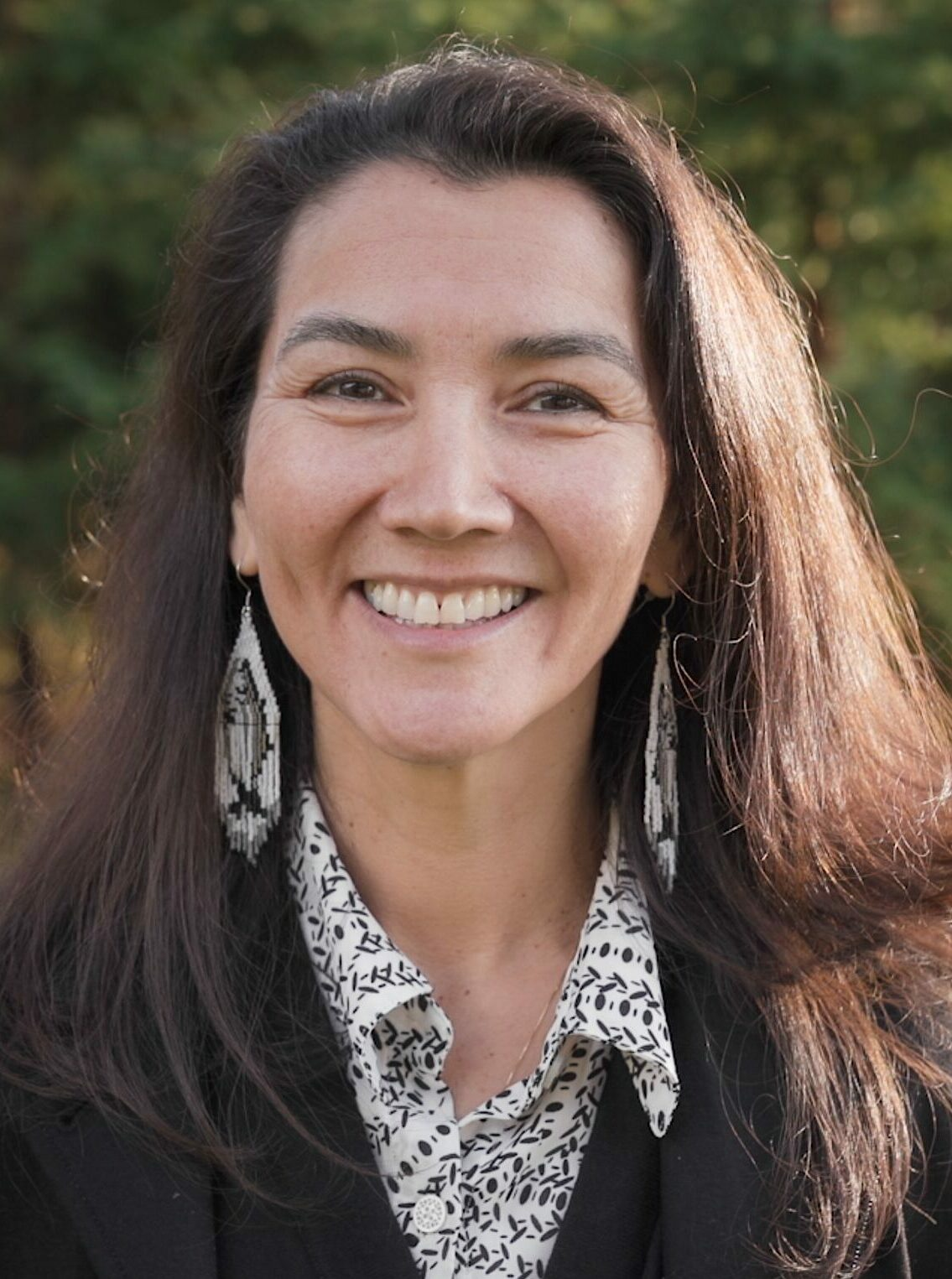

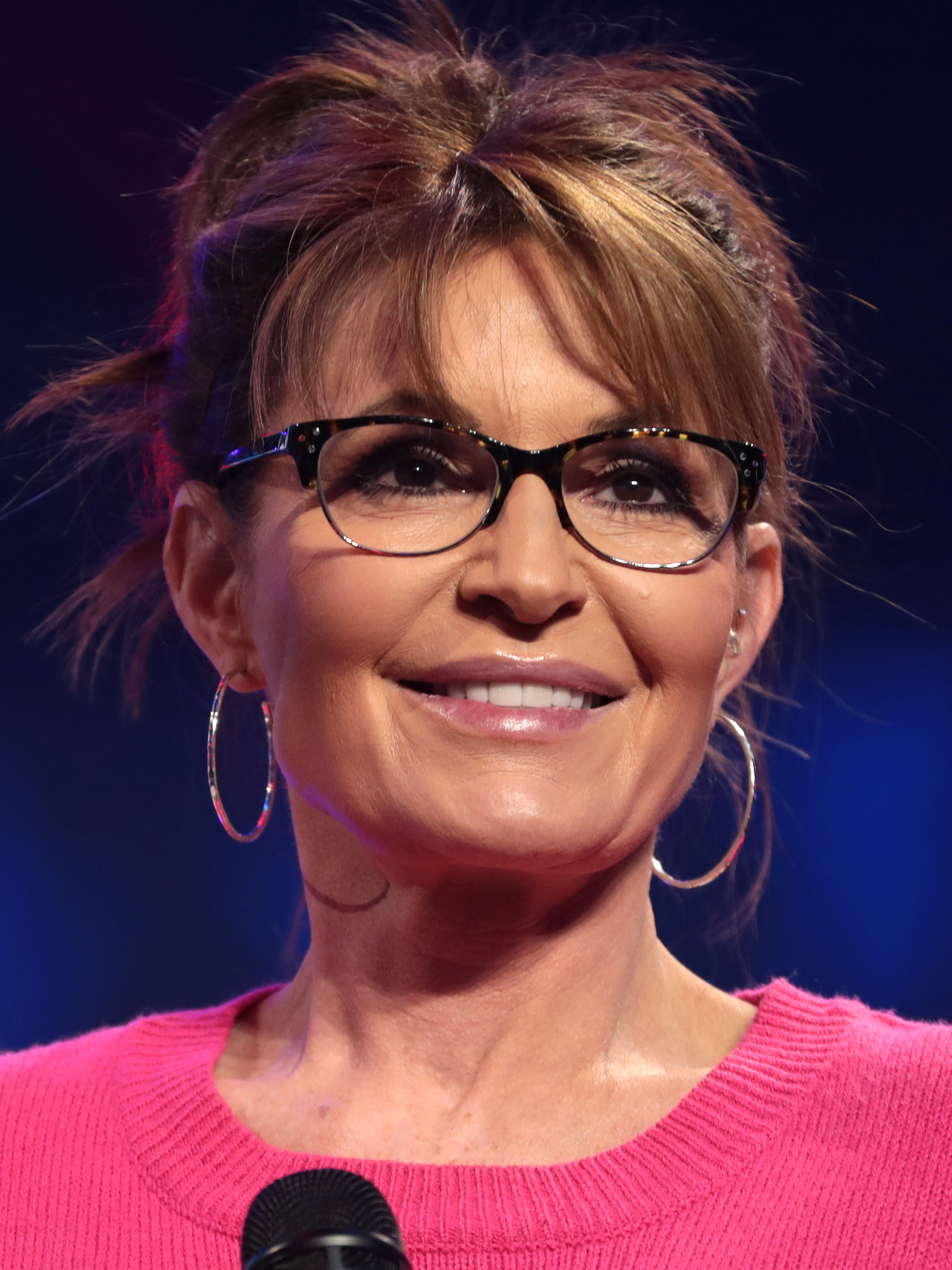

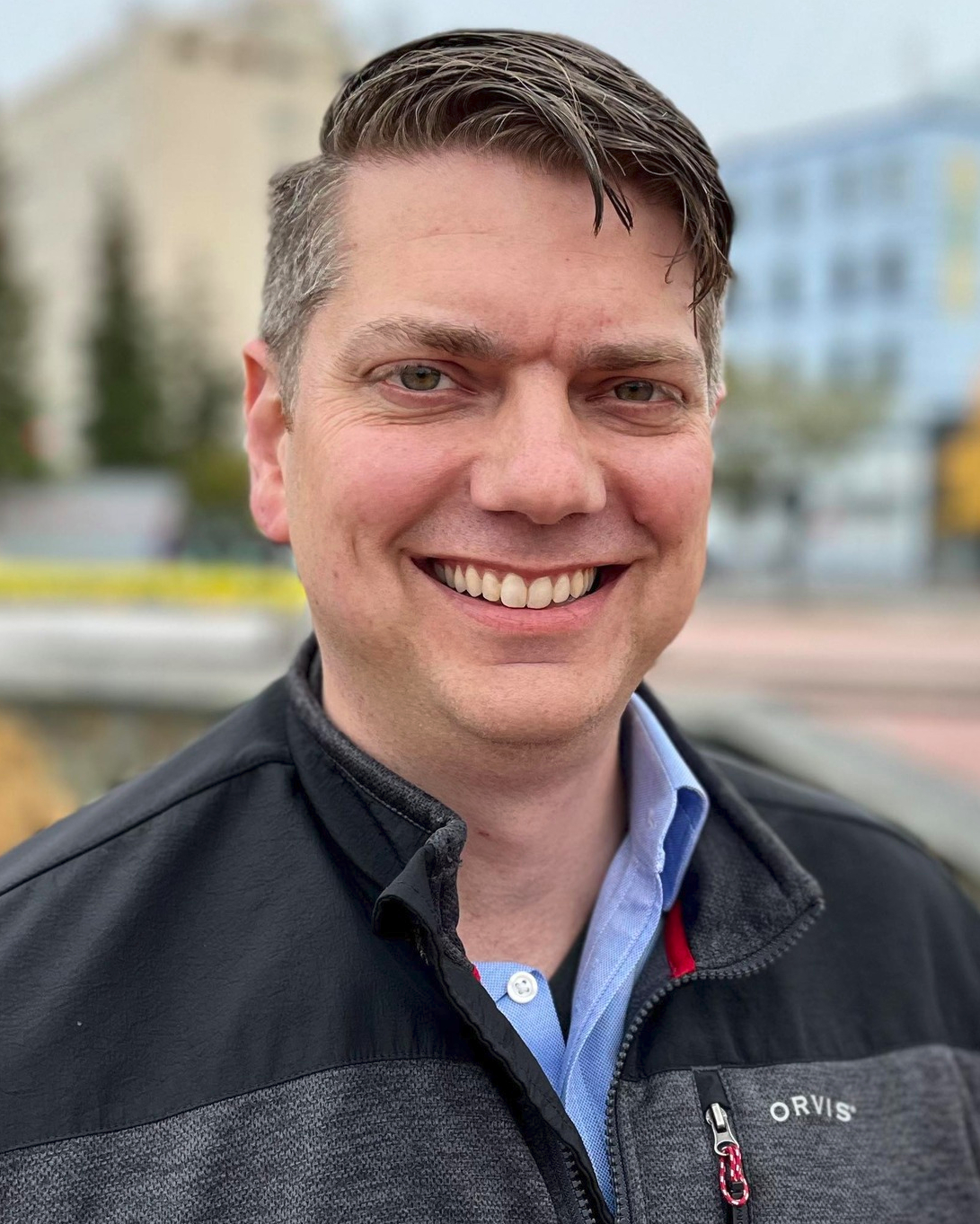
Candidate	Mary Peltola	Sarah Palin	Nick Begich III
Party	Democratic	Republican	Republican
First round	74,817; 39.66%	58,339; 30.92%	52,536; 27.84%
Final round	91,266; 51.48%	86,026; 48.52%	Eliminated
- Peltola: 50–60% 60–70% 70–80% 80–90% Palin: 50–60% 60–70% 70–80%
U.S. Representative before election
Don Young
Republican
Elected U.S. Representative
Mary Peltola
Democratic

The 2022 Alaska's at-large congressional district special election was held on August 16 to fill the seat left vacant after the death of Republican incumbent Don Young. Mary Peltola was elected in a 3-way race against former governor Sarah Palin and Nick Begich III in the election, becoming the first Alaska Native and woman to represent Alaska in the House.

The election was the first to use Alaska's new ranked-choice voting (RCV) method, approved by voters in 2020. The winners of the top-four blanket primary advanced to the ranked-choice runoff election, but only three candidates competed (as Al Gross withdrew and endorsed Peltola). Peltola was declared the winner on August 31 after all ballots were counted. Peltola's victory was widely seen as an upset in a traditionally Republican state. She became the first Democrat to win a statewide election in Alaska since 2008 and was sworn in on September 13.

The race attracted attention as the first high-profile race using RCV. The results were praised by some pundits and activists, with the pro-RCV lobbying group FairVote arguing the low number of spoiled ballots proved Alaskans understood how to use the system. Former presidential candidate Andrew Yang said the election served as a model for electing moderate candidates to office, regardless of partisan affiliation.

However, experts in social choice criticized the procedure for several pathological behaviors, resulting from a phenomenon called a center squeeze. Begich was eliminated in the first round, despite being preferred by a majority of voters to each one of his opponents, with 53% of voters ranking him above Peltola. However, Palin spoiled the election by splitting the first-round vote, leading to Begich's elimination and causing Republicans to lose the seat. The election was also an example of a no-show paradox, in which a voter's ballot has the opposite of its intended effect (e.g. a candidate losing because they "have too much support"); Peltola's win was attributable to Palin supporters turning out to rank Peltola in last place, behind both Palin and Begich.

== Nonpartisan blanket primary ==
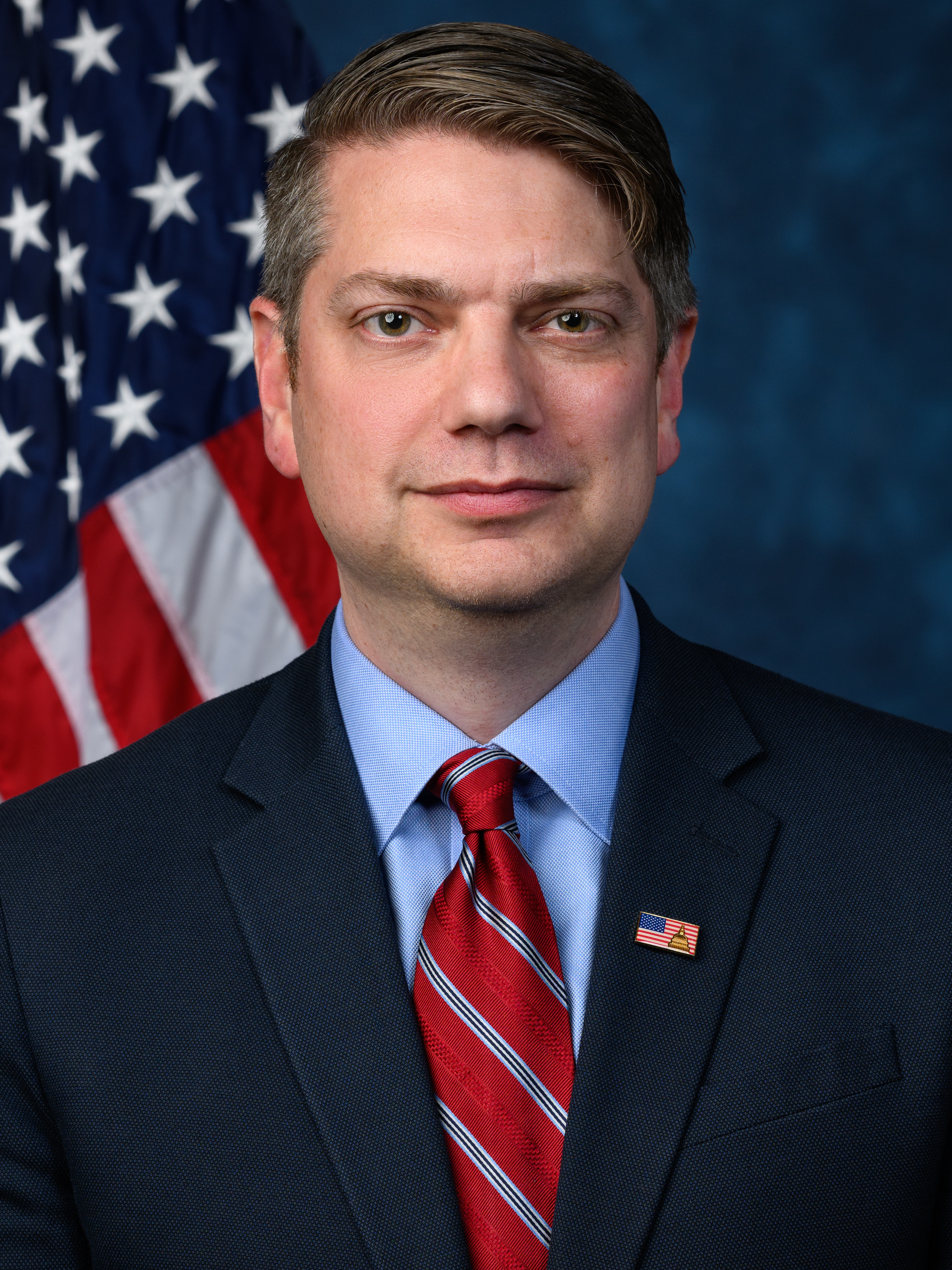
Nick Begich III

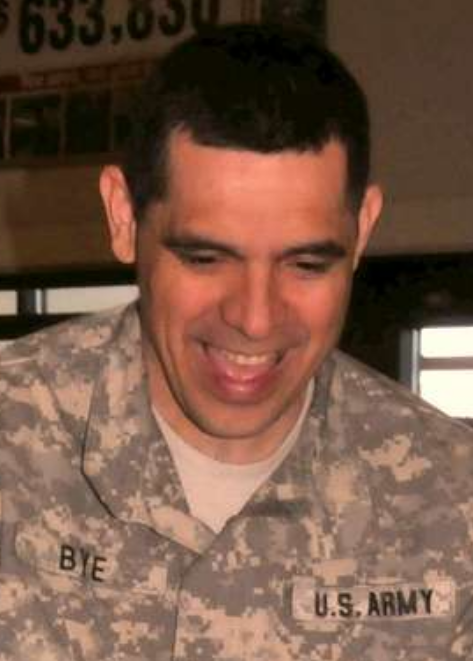
Chris Bye

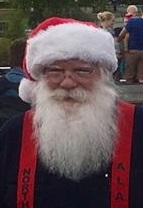
Santa Claus

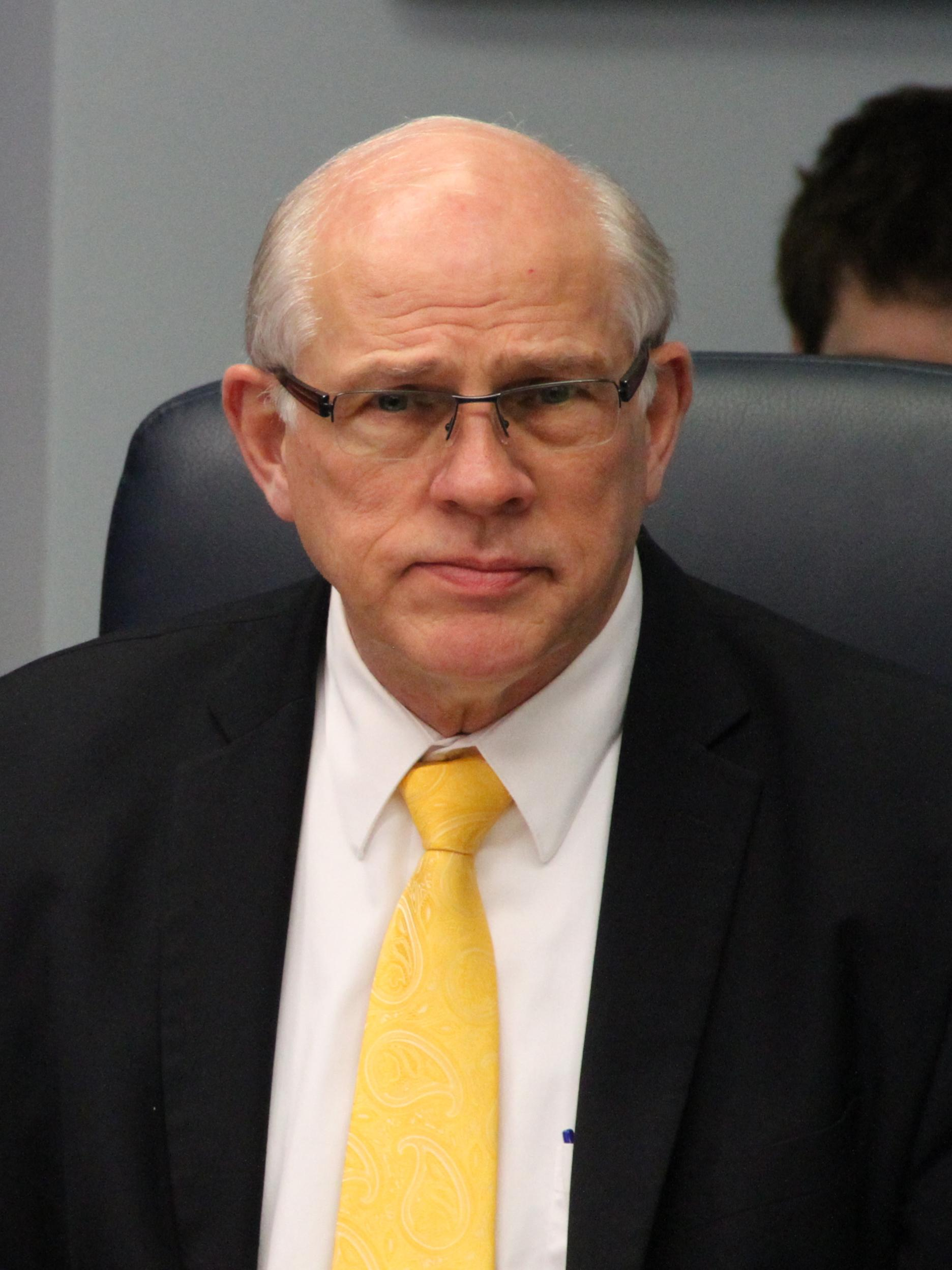
John Coghill

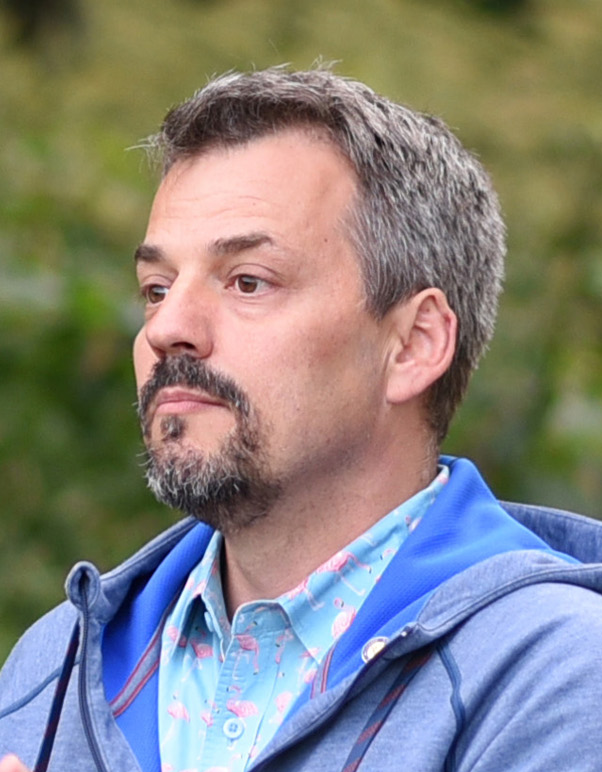
Christopher Constant

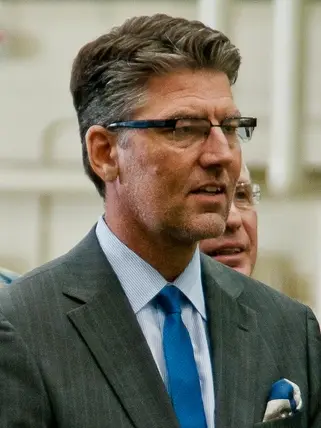
Andrew Halcro

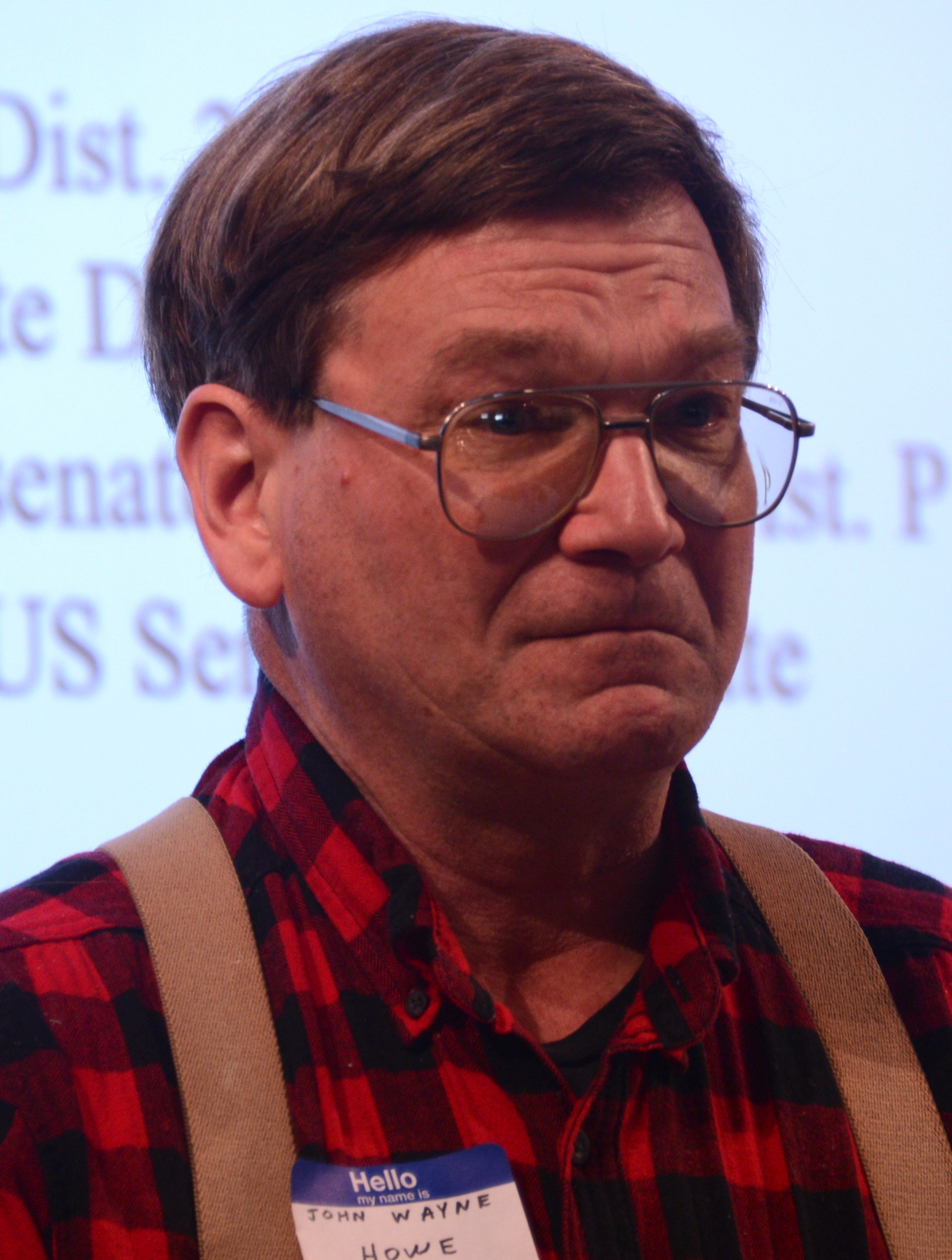
John Howe

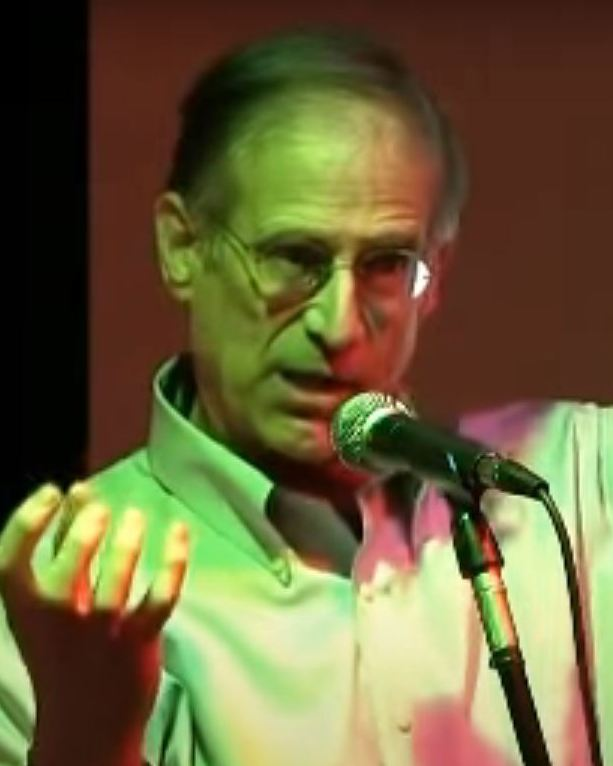
Jeff Lowenfels

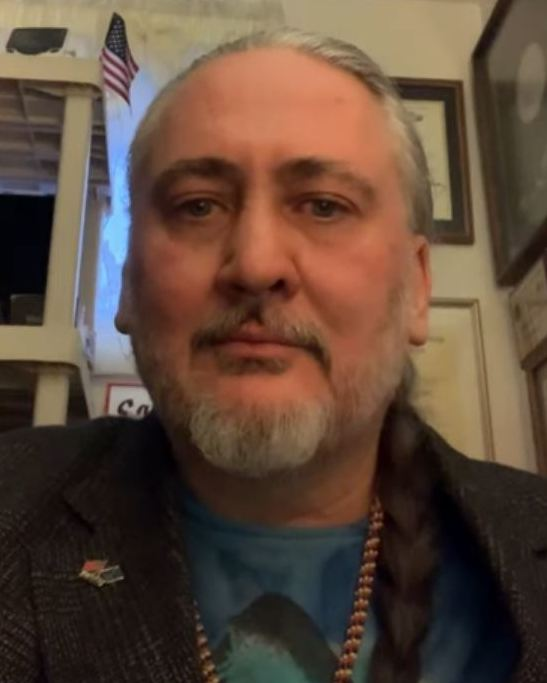
J. R. Myers

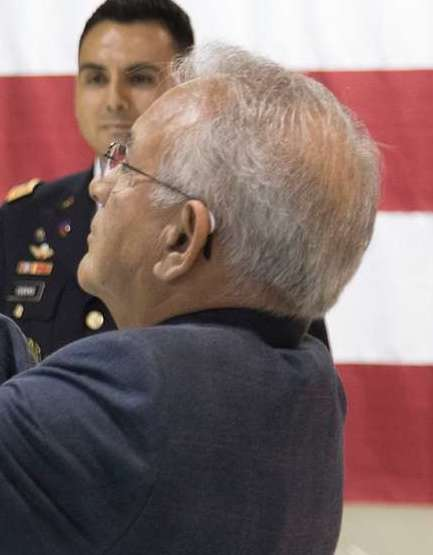
Emil Notti

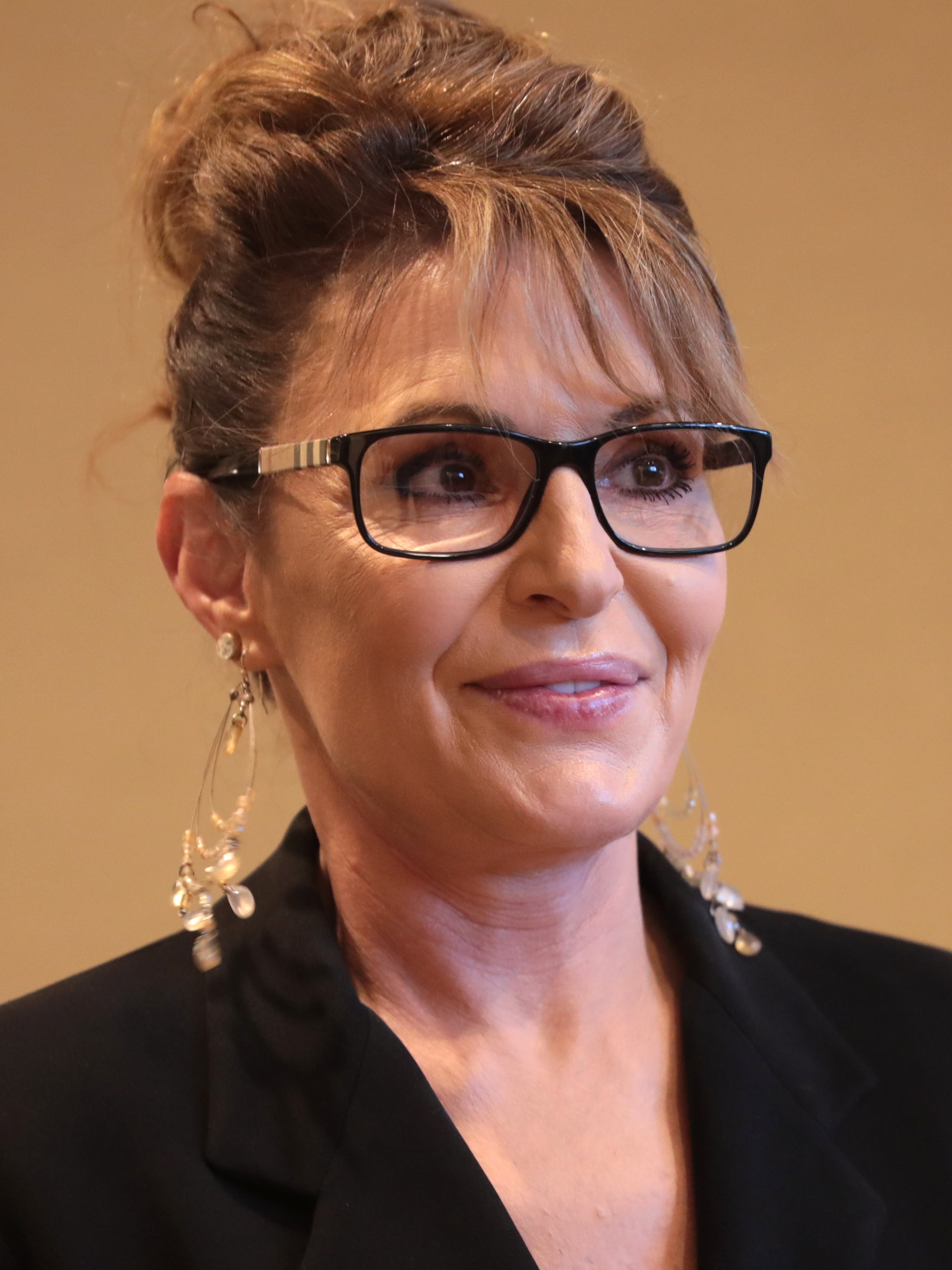
Sarah Palin

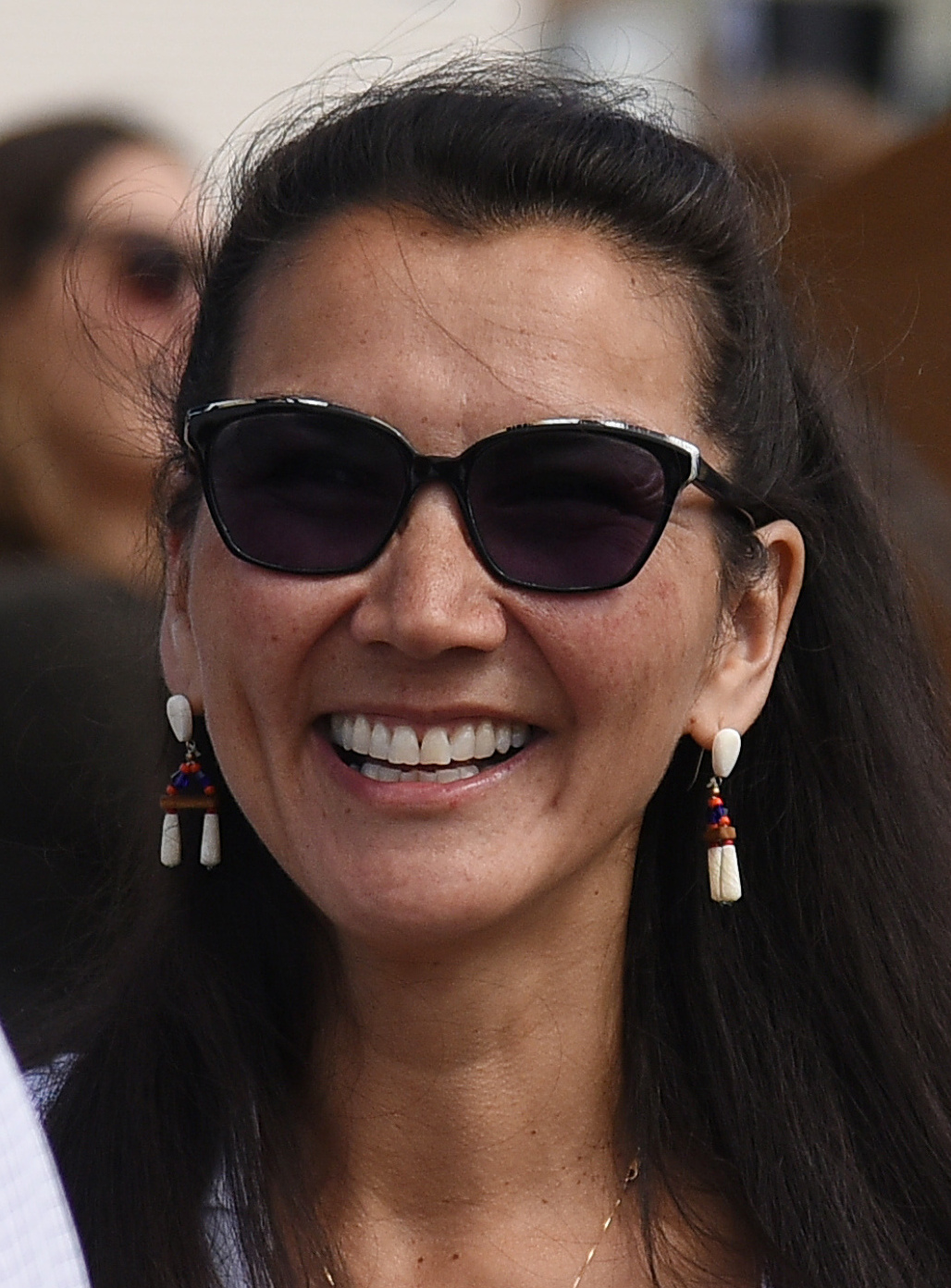
Mary Peltola

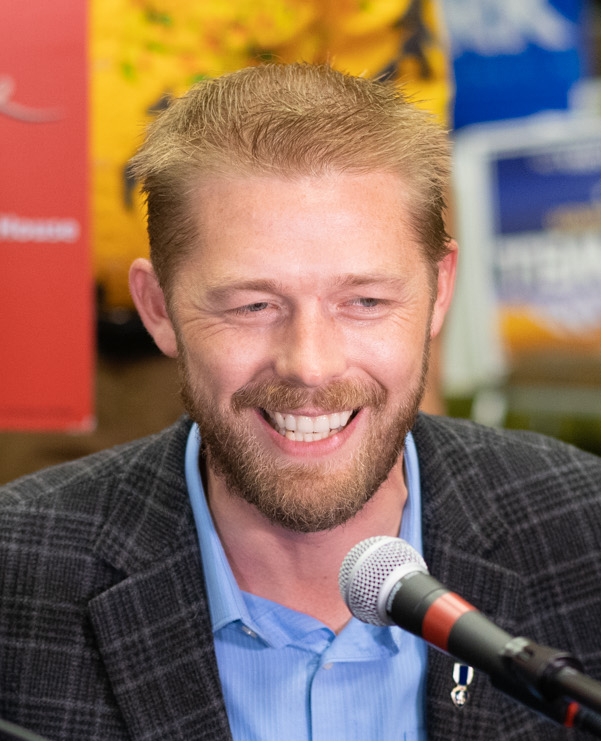
Josh Revak

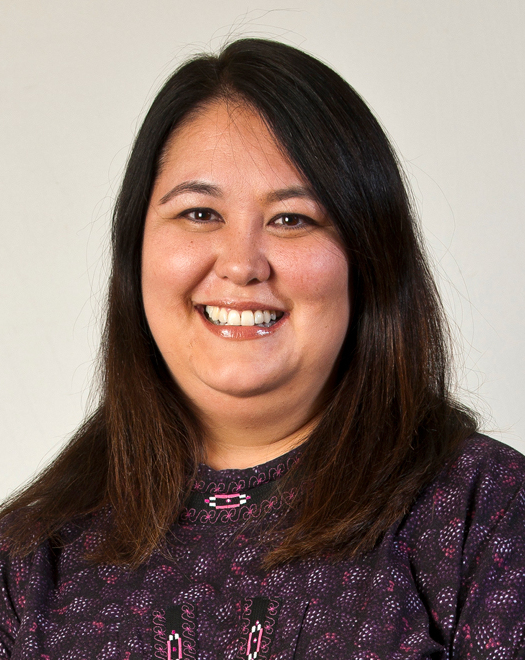
Tara Sweeney

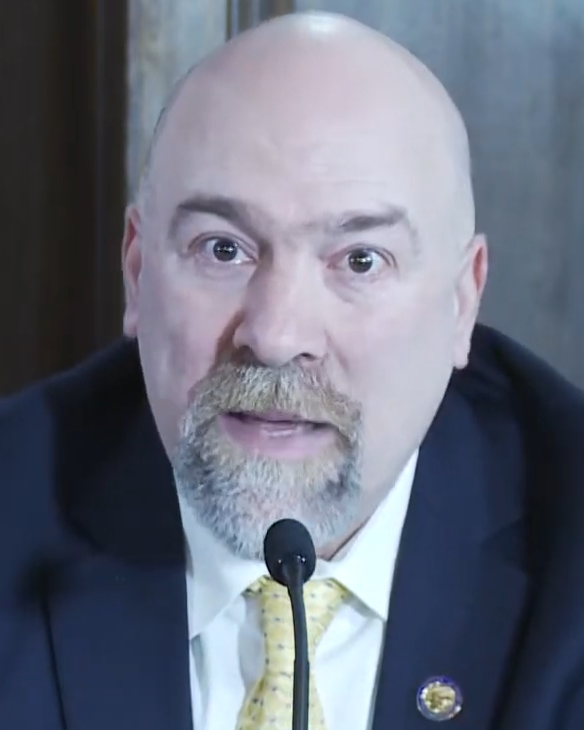
Adam Wool

=== Candidates ===
==== Advanced to general election ====
- Nick Begich III (Republican), Alaska Policy Forum board member, grandson of former U.S. Representative Nick Begich Sr., nephew of former U.S. Senator Mark Begich and Alaska Senate Minority Leader Tom Begich
- Sarah Palin (Republican), former governor of Alaska (2006–2009) and nominee for vice president of the United States in 2008
- Mary Peltola (Democratic), former state representative (1999–2009) and executive director of the Kuskokwim River Inter-Tribal Fish Commission

==== Withdrew after advancing to general election ====
- Al Gross (independent), orthopedic surgeon, commercial fisherman, son of former Alaska Attorney General Avrum Gross. He was endorsed by the Democratic Party as nominee for U.S. Senate in 2020 (After placing third, he withdrew and endorsed Peltola)

==== Eliminated in primary ====
- Dennis Aguayo (independent)
- Jay R. Armstrong (Republican), gold miner
- Brian Beal (independent)
- Tim Beck (independent), former Fairbanks North Star Borough Assembly member (1998–2004, 2005–2011), candidate for FNSB mayor (2000) and Alaska Senate (2006)
- Gregg Brelsford (independent), lawyer and former manager of Bristol Bay Borough (2018–2020)
- Robert Brown (independent), veteran
- Chris Bye (Libertarian), fishing guide
- John Callahan (Republican), public affairs officer for the Alaska Air National Guard
- Arlene Carl (independent), retiree
- Santa Claus (independent), North Pole city councillor (2015–2018, since 2019) and mayor pro tem (endorsed Peltola)
- John Coghill (Republican), former majority leader of the Alaskan State Senate (2013–2017), former state senator (2009–2021), former majority leader of the Alaskan House of Representatives (2002–2006), former state representative (1999–2009), son of former lieutenant governor Jack Coghill, and U.S. Air Force veteran
- Christopher Constant (Democratic), Anchorage Assembly member since 2017
- Lady Donna Dutchess (independent), judicial reform activist
- Otto Florschutz (Republican), former Wrangell Port Commissioner
- Laurel Foster (independent), paralegal
- Tom Gibbons (Republican), business manager
- Karyn Griffin (independent), political organizer and activist
- Andrew Halcro (independent), former Republican state representative (1998–2003) and Independent candidate for governor of Alaska in 2006
- Ted Heintz (independent), Corporate Contract Services Professional
- William Hibler III (independent), former glaciologist with the University of Alaska Fairbanks and Democratic candidate for Alaska's at-large congressional district in 2016 and 2020
- John Howe (Alaskan Independence Party), machinist and Alaskan Independence Party nominee for U.S. Senate in 2020
- David Hughes (independent), program manager
- Don Knight (independent)
- Jeff Lowenfels (independent), attorney and gardening writer
- Robert "Bob" Lyons (Republican), case manager
- Anne McCabe (independent), former president of the Kenai Peninsula Educational Support Association
- Mikel Melander, blue collar worker
- Sherry Mettler (independent), businesswoman
- Mike Milligan (Democratic), former Kodiak Island Borough Assembly member, Green Party nominee for U.S. House (1992) and lieutenant governor (1998)
- J. R. Myers (Libertarian), behavioral health clinician, founder of the Alaska Constitution Party and its nominee for governor in 2014
- Emil Notti (Democratic), engineer, former commissioner of the Alaska Department of Commerce, former chair of the Alaska Democratic Party, and nominee for Alaska's at-large congressional district in 1973
- Robert Ornelas (American Independent Party), perennial candidate
- Silvio Pellegrini (independent), cyber security manager, IT project manager, and intelligence analyst for the US Air Force Reserve
- Josh Revak (Republican), state senator for District M (2019–present) and U.S. Army veteran
- Maxwell Sumner (Republican), homebuilder
- Tara Sweeney (Republican), former assistant secretary of the Interior for the Bureau of Indian Affairs (2018–2021) (ran as write-in candidate in general election)
- David Thistle (independent)
- Ernest Thomas (Democratic)
- Clayton Trotter (Republican), college professor
- Bradley Welter (Republican)
- Jason Williams (independent)
- Joe Woodward (Republican)
- Adam Wool (Democratic), state representative (2015–present)
- Stephen Wright (Republican), candidate for Alaska's at-large congressional district in 2016, candidate for Alaska State Senate in 2020, and U.S. Air Force veteran

==== Withdrawn ====
- Breck Craig (independent), candidate for U.S. Senate in 2016
- Richard Morris (independent)
- Jesse Sumner (Republican), member of the Matanuska-Susitna Borough Assembly; later filed for and was elected to a seat in the Alaska House of Representatives

==== Declined ====
- Les Gara (Democratic), former state representative (2003–2019) (running for governor)
- Mead Treadwell (Republican), former lieutenant governor of Alaska (endorsed Sweeney)

=== Endorsements ===
Nick Begich (R)

State legislators

- Ben Carpenter, state representative (2019–present)
- John Coghill, former state senator (2009–2021) and former state representative
- Mia Costello, state senator (2015–present)
- Mike Cronk, state representative (2021–present)
- Lynn Gattis, former state representative (2013–2017)
- Ron Gillham, state representative (2021–present)
- Roger Holland, state senator (2021–present)
- Shelley Hughes, Majority Leader of the Alaska Senate (2021–present), state senator (2017–present), and former state representative (2012–2017)
- Pete Kelly, former president of the Alaska Senate (2017–2019) and state senator (2013–2019; 1999–2003)
- Kevin McCabe, state representative (2021–present)
- Ken McCarty, state representative (2021–present)
- Tom McKay, state representative (2021–present)
- Charisse Millett, former Majority Leader of the Alaska House of Representatives (2017–2019) and state representative (2009–2019)
- Mike Prax, state representative (2020–present)
- George Rauscher, state representative (2017–present)
- Mike Shower, state senator (2018–present)
- Sarah Vance, state representative (2019–present)

Organizations

- Alaska Outdoor Council
- Alaska Republican Party
- Americans for Prosperity Alaska
- Anchorage Young Republicans
- Associated Builders and Contractors, Alaska Chapter
- FreedomWorks for America

Individuals

- Jim and Faye Palin, Sarah Palin's former father-in-law and mother-in-law
Santa Claus (I)

State legislators

- Ray Metcalfe
Christopher Constant (D)

U.S. senators

- Mark Begich, former United States senator (2009–2015)

State legislators

- Tom Begich, state senator (2017–present)
- Elvi Gray-Jackson, state senator (2017–present)

Local officials

- Austin Quinn-Davidson, acting Mayor of Anchorage (2020–2021) and member of the Anchorage Assembly (2018–present)
Al Gross (I)

State officials

- Tony Knowles, former governor of Alaska (1994–2002) and former mayor of Anchorage (1982–1987)
- Fran Ulmer, former lieutenant governor of Alaska (1994–2002), former state representative (1987–1994), and former mayor of Juneau (1983–1985)

State legislators

- Hollis French, former state senator (2003–2015)
- Beth Kerttula, former House Minority Leader of the Alaska House of Representatives (2007–2014) and state representative (2007–2014)
- Joe Paskvan, former state senator (2009–2013)
- Sally Smith, former mayor of Juneau (2000–2003) and former state representative (1977–1983)
Sarah Palin (R)

U.S. executive branch officials

- Nikki Haley, former U.S. Ambassador to the United Nations (2017–2018) and former governor of South Carolina (2011–2017)
- Donald Trump, 45th president of the United States (2017–2021)

U.S. federal legislators

- Rand Paul, U.S. senator from Kentucky (2011–present)
- Elise Stefanik, U.S. representative, New York's 21st congressional district (2015–present) and House Republican Conference Chair (2021–present)

Individuals

- Dan Bongino, conservative political commentator
- Kimberly Guilfoyle, television news personality, ex-wife of Gavin Newsom, fiance of Donald Trump Jr., and former advisor to former president Donald Trump
- Donald Trump Jr., businessman and son of former president Donald Trump

Organizations

- National Right to Life Committee
Mary Peltola (D)

Individuals

- Alyse Galvin, Independent candidate for Alaska's at-large congressional seat in 2018 and 2020
Josh Revak (R)

Individuals

- Anne Garland Young, Don Young's widow
Tara Sweeney (R)

U.S. executive branch officials

- Thomas J. Barrett, former U.S. Deputy Secretary of Transportation (2007–2009) and former United States Coast Guard admiral

State officials

- Mead Treadwell, former lieutenant governor of Alaska (2010–2014)

Organizations

- ANCSA Regional Association

=== Debates and forums ===
2022 Alaska at-large special primary debates and forums
No.	Date	Host	Moderator	Link	Participants								
P Participant A Absent N Non-invitee I Invitee W Withdrawn													
P Participant A Absent N Non-invitee I Invitee W Withdrawn					Begich	Coghill	Constant	Gross	Lowenfels	Palin	Revak	Peltola	Sweeney
1	May 12, 2022	Alaska Chamber; Alaska Miners Association; Alaska Oil and Gas Association; Alaska Support Industry Alliance; Associated General Contractors of Alaska; Resource Development Council	N/A	YouTube	P	P	P	P	P	P	P	P	P

=== Polling ===
Poll source	Date(s) administered	Sample size (Note: Key: A – all adults RV – registered voters LV – likely voters V – unclear)	Margin of error	Nick Begich (R)	Santa Claus (I)	John Coghill (R)	Christopher Constant (D)	Al Gross (I)	Andrew Halcro (I)	Jeff Lowenfels (I)	Sarah Palin (R)	Mary Peltola (D)	Josh Revak (R)	Tara Sweeney (R)	Adam Wool (D)	Other	Undecided
Alaska Survey Research	May 6–9, 2022	605 (LV)	± 4.0%	16%	6%	2%	5%	13%	2%	3%	19%	5%	4%	4%	2%	4%	16%
Remington Research Group (R)	April 7–9, 2022	955 (LV)	± 3.1%	21%	–	–	7%	26%	–	–	31%	–	3%	2%	–	4%	6%

=== Results ===
Primary election results by state house district

2022 Alaska's at-large congressional district special primary election results
Party	Candidate	Votes	%
Republican	Sarah Palin	43,601	27.01
Republican	Nick Begich III	30,861	19.12
Independent	Al Gross (Note: Gross withdrew from the general election following the primary.)	20,392	12.63
Democratic	Mary Peltola	16,265	10.08
Republican	Tara Sweeney	9,560	5.92
Independent	Santa Claus	7,625	4.72
Democratic	Christopher Constant	6,224	3.86
Independent	Jeff Lowenfels	5,994	3.71
Republican	John Coghill	3,842	2.38
Republican	Josh Revak	3,785	2.34
Independent	Andrew Halcro	3,013	1.87
Democratic	Adam Wool	2,730	1.69
Democratic	Emil Notti	1,777	1.10
Libertarian	Chris Bye	1,049	0.65
Democratic	Mike Milligan	608	0.38
Independence	John Howe	380	0.24
Independent	Laurel Foster	338	0.21
Republican	Stephen Wright	332	0.21
Republican	Jay Armstrong	286	0.18
Libertarian	J. R. Myers	285	0.18
Independent	Gregg Brelsford	284	0.18
Democratic	Ernest Thomas	199	0.12
Republican	Bob Lyons	197	0.12
Republican	Otto Florschutz	193	0.12
Republican	Maxwell Sumner	133	0.08
Republican	Clayton Trotter	121	0.07
Independent	Anne McCabe	118	0.07
Republican	John Callahan	114	0.07
Independent	Arlene Carle	107	0.07
Independent	Tim Beck	96	0.06
Independent	Sherry Mettler	92	0.06
Republican	Tom Gibbons	94	0.06
Independent	Lady Donna Dutchess	87	0.05
American Independent	Robert Ornelas	83	0.05
Independent	Ted Heintz	70	0.04
Independent	Silvio Pellegrini	70	0.04
Independent	Karyn Griffin	67	0.04
Independent	David Hughes	54	0.03
Independent	Don Knight	46	0.03
Republican	Jo Woodward	44	0.03
Independent	Jason Williams	37	0.02
Independent	Robert Brown	36	0.02
Independent	Dennis Aguayo	31	0.02
Independent	William Hibler III	25	0.02
Republican	Bradley Welter	24	0.01
Independent	David Thistle	23	0.01
Independent	Brian Beal	19	0.01
Republican	Mikel Melander	17	0.01
Total votes		161,428	100.0

== General election ==
Under Alaska's top-four primary system, if a general election candidate drops out, the director of elections may replace them with the name of the fifth-place finisher. Shortly after the primary, Al Gross dropped out of the general election, but Division of Elections Director Gail Fenumiai did not advance Tara Sweeney in his place because there were less than 64 days remaining until the general election as required by law. After a lawsuit, the Alaska Supreme Court upheld Fenumiai's decision.

=== Predictions ===
Source	Ranking	As of
The Cook Political Report	Likely R	August 10, 2022
Inside Elections	Likely R	August 4, 2022
Sabato's Crystal Ball	Safe R	June 22, 2022

=== Post-primary endorsements ===
Nick Begich (R)

State legislators

- DeLena Johnson, state representative
- Rob Myers Jr., state senator (2021–present)
- Steve Thompson, state representative (2011–present)
- Cathy Tilton, state representative (2015–present)

Local officials

- Amy Demboski, Anchorage assembly member

Organizations

- BIPAC
Sarah Palin (R)

U.S. federal legislators

- Newt Gingrich, former Speaker of the United States House of Representatives (1995–1999) from Georgia's 6th congressional district (1979–1999)

Organizations

- NRA Political Victory Fund
Mary Peltola (D)

U.S. federal legislators

- Mark Begich, former U.S. senator (2009–2015), former mayor of Anchorage (2003–2009), and uncle of Nick Begich III

State officials

- Tony Knowles, former governor of Alaska (1994–2002)
- Fran Ulmer, former lieutenant governor of Alaska (1994–2002)

State legislators

- Zack Fields, state representative (2019–present)
- Berta Gardner, former state senator (2013–2019) and representative (2005–2013)
- Ivy Spohnholz, state representative (2016–present)

Local officials

- Santa Claus, North Pole city councilor (2015–2018, 2019–present) and current mayor pro tem (Independent)
- Christopher Constant, Anchorage Assembly member
- Forrest Dunbar, Anchorage Assembly member
- Mike Navarre, former mayor of Kenai Peninsula Borough (2011–2017) and former state representative (1985–1996)

Individuals

- Al Gross, orthopedic surgeon, commercial fisherman, son of former Alaska Attorney General Avrum Gross, and Democratic-endorsed nominee for U.S. Senate in 2020 (Independent)
- Emil Notti, Alaska Native activist and nominee for 1973 Alaska's at-large congressional district special election

Labor unions

- Alaska AFL–CIO

Organizations

- Sealaska Corporation

Tribes

- Organized Village of Kwethluk
- Orutsararmiut Native Council

=== Polling ===
Poll source	Date(s) administered	Sample size	Margin of error	RCV count	Nick Begich (R)	Al Gross (I)	Sarah Palin (R)	Mary Peltola (D)	Undecided
Alaska Survey Research	July 20–25, 2022	1,219 (LV)	± 2.9%	1	30%	–	29%	41%	–
Alaska Survey Research	July 20–25, 2022	1,219 (LV)	± 2.9%	2	55%	–	–	45%	–
Alaska Survey Research	July 20–25, 2022	1,219 (LV)	± 2.9%	2* (Note: Hypothetical scenario with Palin and Peltola as the top two based on expressed ranked choice preferences)	–	–	49%	51%	–
Alaska Survey Research	July 2–5, 2022	1,201 (LV)	± 2.9%	1	31%	–	29%	40%	–
Alaska Survey Research	July 2–5, 2022	1,201 (LV)	± 2.9%	2	57%	–	–	43%	–
Alaska Survey Research	July 2–5, 2022	1,201 (LV)	± 2.9%	2*	–	–	49%	51%	–
	June 21, 2022	Gross withdraws from the race							
Alaska Survey Research	May 6–9, 2022	605 (LV)	± 4.0%	1	29%	27%	26%	19%	–
Alaska Survey Research	May 6–9, 2022	605 (LV)	± 4.0%	2	33%	40%	28%	–	–
Alaska Survey Research	May 6–9, 2022	605 (LV)	± 4.0%	3	54%	46%	–	–	–

Hypothetical polling

Poll source	Date(s) administered	Sample size	Margin of error	RCV count	Nick Begich (R)	Santa Claus (I)	Christopher Constant (D)	Al Gross (I)	Sarah Palin (R)	Tara Sweeney (R)	Undecided
Alaska Survey Research	May 6–9, 2022	605 (LV)	± 4.0%	1	28%	21%	–	26%	25%	–	–
Alaska Survey Research	May 6–9, 2022	605 (LV)	± 4.0%	2	32%	–	–	40%	28%	–	–
Alaska Survey Research	May 6–9, 2022	605 (LV)	± 4.0%	3	53%	–	–	47%	–	–	–
Alaska Survey Research	May 6–9, 2022	605 (LV)	± 4.0%	3* (Note: Hypothetical scenario with Claus and Palin as the top two based on expressed ranked choice preferences)	–	53%	–	–	47%	–	–
Alaska Survey Research	May 6–9, 2022	605 (LV)	± 4.0%	1	29%	–	17%	27%	28%	–	–
Alaska Survey Research	May 6–9, 2022	605 (LV)	± 4.0%	2	32%	–	–	40%	28%	–	–
Alaska Survey Research	May 6–9, 2022	605 (LV)	± 4.0%	3	54%	–	–	46%	–	–	–
Alaska Survey Research	May 6–9, 2022	605 (LV)	± 4.0%	1	28%	–		35%	26%	11%	–
Alaska Survey Research	May 6–9, 2022	605 (LV)	± 4.0%	2	32%	–		39%	29%	–	–
Alaska Survey Research	May 6–9, 2022	605 (LV)	± 4.0%	3	55%	–		45%	–	–	–

Al Gross vs. Sarah Palin vs. Lora Reinbold vs. Josh Revak

Poll source	Date(s) administered	Sample size	Margin of error	RCV count	Al Gross (I)	Sarah Palin (R)	Lora Reinbold (R)	Josh Revak (R)	Undecided
Change Research (D) (Note: This poll was sponsored by 314 Action, which supports Gross)	March 25–29, 2022	728 (LV)	± 3.6%	BA	33%	30%	8%	9%	16%
Change Research (D)	March 25–29, 2022	728 (LV)	± 3.6%	2	33%	30%	–	11%	26%
Change Research (D)	March 25–29, 2022	728 (LV)	± 3.6%	3	35%	35%	–	–	30%

Al Gross vs. Sarah Palin

Poll source	Date(s) administered	Sample size	Margin of error	Al Gross (I)	Sarah Palin (R)	Undecided
Change Research (D)	March 25–29, 2022	728 (LV)	± 3.6%	40%	42%	19%

Al Gross vs. Josh Revak

Poll source	Date(s) administered	Sample size	Margin of error	Al Gross (I)	Josh Revak (R)	Undecided
Change Research (D)	March 25–29, 2022	728 (LV)	± 3.6%	35%	34%	31%

=== Results ===
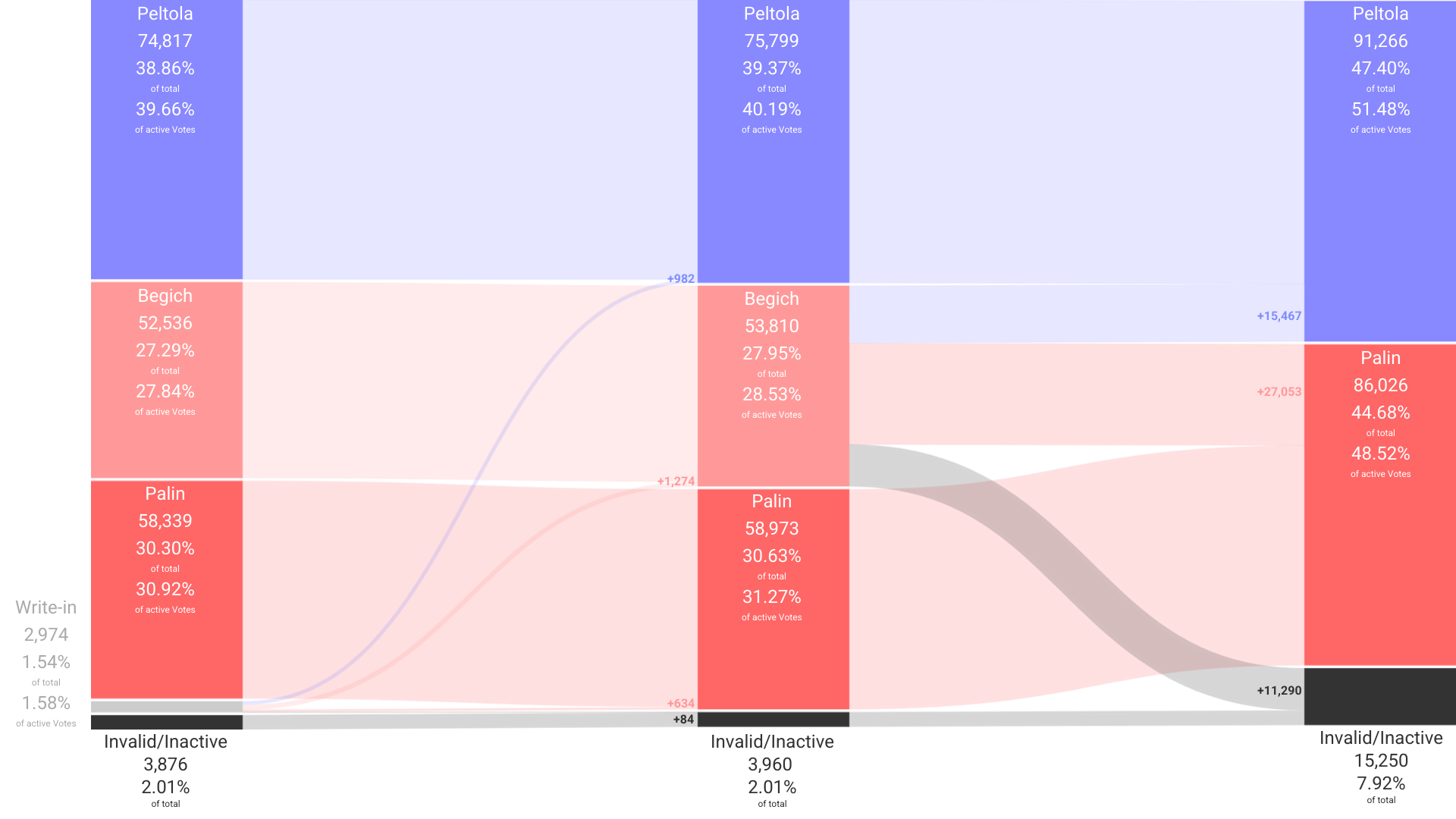
Transfer of votes from initial tabulation to the final round.

2022 Alaska's at-large congressional district special election
Party	Candidate	First choice		Round 1			Round 2	
Party	Candidate	Votes	%	Votes	%	Transfer	Votes	%
Democratic	Mary Peltola	74,817	39.66%	75,799	40.19%	+15,467	91,266	51.48%
Republican	Sarah Palin	58,339	30.92%	58,973	31.27%	+27,053	86,026	48.52%
Republican	Nick Begich III	52,536	27.85%	53,810	28.53%	-53,810	Eliminated	
Write-in		2,974	1.58%	Eliminated				
Total votes		188,666		188,582 (Note: Ballots from seven rural villages not included in RCV tally.)			177,292	
Inactive ballots (Note: Includes blank ballots, overvotes, and exhausted ballots where another continuing candidate was not ranked.)		3,876		3,707		+11,290	14,997	
Democratic gain from Republican								

First choice results by state house district

District	Nick Begich III Republican		Sarah Palin Republican		Mary Peltola Democratic		Write-in		Margin (Note: Margin is the difference between the number of votes won by the winning candidate and the number of votes won by the candidate who won the second-largest number of votes.)		Total votes
District	#	%	#	%	#	%	#	%	#	%	Total votes
District 1	1,448	33.42%	1,409	32.52%	1,432	33.05%	44	1.02%	16	0.37%	4,333
District 2	979	20.03%	1,504	30.78%	2,359	48.27%	45	0.92%	855	17.50%	4,887
District 3	1,522	23.28%	1,235	18.89%	3,723	56.94%	59	0.90%	2,201	33.66%	6,539
District 4	1,003	17.38%	701	12.15%	4,014	69.55%	53	0.92%	3,011	52.17%	5,771
District 5	929	23.05%	1,301	32.27%	1,743	43.24%	58	1.44%	442	10.97%	4,031
District 6	1,923	25.63%	2,468	32.90%	3,039	40.51%	72	0.96%	571	7.61%	7,502
District 7	1,673	30.99%	2,448	45.34%	1,213	22.47%	65	1.20%	775	14.35%	5,399
District 8	1,867	28.54%	3,216	49.17%	1,394	21.31%	64	0.98%	1,349	20.62%	6,541
District 9	2,684	32.55%	1,656	20.08%	3,722	45.13%	185	2.24%	1,038	12.59%	8,247
District 10	1,687	32.11%	1,370	26.08%	2,099	39.96%	97	1.85%	412	7.84%	5,253
District 11	2,054	33.11%	1,506	24.28%	2,537	40.90%	106	1.71%	483	7.79%	6,203
District 12	1,341	28.17%	1,114	23.40%	2,228	46.81%	77	1.62%	887	18.63%	4,760
District 13	1,096	27.41%	1,047	26.18%	1,791	44.79%	65	1.63%	695	17.38%	3,999
District 14	1,000	21.80%	897	19.56%	2,615	57.01%	75	1.64%	1,615	35.21%	4,587
District 15	1,884	32.62%	1,349	23.36%	2,439	42.23%	103	1.78%	555	9.61%	5,775
District 16	1,671	27.09%	1,138	18.45%	3,234	52.43%	125	2.03%	1,563	25.34%	6,168
District 17	905	18.96%	704	14.75%	3,066	64.25%	97	2.03%	2,161	45.28%	4,772
District 18	299	22.91%	360	27.59%	626	47.97%	20	1.53%	266	20.38%	1,305
District 19	536	20.93%	521	20.34%	1,465	57.20%	39	1.52%	929	36.27%	2,561
District 20	885	23.17%	924	24.19%	1,969	51.56%	41	1.07%	1,045	27.36%	3,819
District 21	1,528	28.67%	1,256	23.56%	2,469	46.32%	77	1.44%	941	17.65%	5,330
District 22	755	30.77%	682	27.79%	971	39.57%	46	1.87%	216	8.80%	2,454
District 23	1,909	32.15%	1,884	31.73%	2,044	34.43%	100	1.68%	135	2.27%	5,937
District 24	2,191	37.08%	1,945	32.92%	1,682	28.47%	91	1.54%	246	4.16%	5,909
District 25	2,070	33.93%	2,338	38.32%	1,624	26.62%	69	1.13%	268	4.39%	6,101
District 26	1,566	31.95%	2,398	48.92%	883	18.01%	55	1.12%	832	16.97%	4,902
District 27	1,410	30.78%	2,303	50.27%	809	17.66%	59	1.29%	893	19.49%	4,581
District 28	1,683	32.88%	2,402	46.92%	979	19.12%	55	1.07%	719	14.05%	5,119
District 29	1,834	32.35%	2,390	42.15%	1,395	24.60%	51	0.90%	556	9.81%	5,670
District 30	1,581	26.73%	2,729	46.14%	1,542	26.07%	63	1.07%	1,148	19.41%	5,915
District 31	953	26.64%	1,144	31.98%	1,407	39.33%	73	2.04%	263	7.35%	3,577
District 32	562	26.53%	929	43.86%	581	27.43%	46	2.17%	348	16.43%	2,118
District 33	1,117	27.45%	2,145	52.72%	743	18.26%	64	1.57%	1,028	25.26%	4,069
District 34	1,411	25.52%	1,966	35.56%	2,041	36.91%	111	2.01%	75	1.36%	5,529
District 35	1,182	20.90%	1,453	25.69%	2,911	48.4%	109	1.93%	1,458	25.78%	5,655
District 36	1,485	26.61%	1,979	35.46%	2,030	36.37%	87	1.56%	51	0.91%	5,581
District 37	599	28.62%	563	26.90%	908	43.38%	23	1.10%	309	14.76%	2,093
District 38	289	15.17%	269	14.12%	1,327	69.66%	20	1.05%	1,038	54.49%	1,905
District 39	635	28.01%	391	17.25%	1,185	52.27%	56	2.47%	550	24.26%	2,267
District 40	389	26.46%	303	20.61%	549	37.35%	229	15.58%	160	10.88%	1,470
Overseas voters	1	3.13%	2	6.25%	29	90.63%	0	0.00%	27	84.38%	32
Totals	52,536	27.85%	58,339	30.92%	74,817	39.66%	2,974	1.58%	16,478	8.73%	188,666

Final round results by state house district

District (Note: Results from unofficial tabulation of the raw Cast Vote Record file.)	Mary Peltola Democratic		Sarah Palin Republican		Margin		Total active votes
District	#	%	#	%	#	%	Total active votes
District 1	1,894	49.17%	1,958	50.83%	64	1.66%	3,852
District 2	2,739	59.34%	1,877	40.66%	862	18.67%	4,616
District 3	4,250	68.59%	1,946	31.41%	2,304	37.19%	6,196
District 4	4,408	79.74%	1,120	20.26%	3,288	59.48%	5,528
District 5	2,123	56.05%	1,665	43.95%	458	12.09%	3,788
District 6	3,562	50.10%	3,548	49.90%	14	0.20%	7,110
District 7	1,643	33.34%	3,285	66.66%	1,642	33.32%	4,928
District 8	1,822	30.05%	4,241	69.95%	2,419	39.90%	6,063
District 9	4,536	58.81%	3,177	41.19%	1,359	17.62%	7,713
District 10	2,661	53.83%	2,282	46.17%	379	7.67%	4,943
District 11	3,148	54.23%	2,657	45.77%	491	8.46%	5,805
District 12	2,694	59.43%	1,839	40.57%	855	18.86%	4,533
District 13	2,172	57.07%	1,634	42.93%	538	14.14%	3,806
District 14	3,013	68.93%	1,358	31.07%	1,655	37.86%	4,371
District 15	3,031	55.99%	2,382	44.01%	649	11.99%	5,413
District 16	3,847	65.67%	2,011	34.33%	1,836	31.34%	5,858
District 17	3,475	76.12%	1,090	23.88%	2,385	52.25%	4,565
District 18	727	58.39%	518	41.61%	209	16.79%	1,245
District 19	1,675	68.28%	778	31.72%	897	36.57%	2,453
District 20	2,331	63.64%	1,332	36.36%	999	27.27%	3,663
District 21	2,969	58.68%	2,091	41.32%	878	17.35%	5,060
District 22	1,240	53.54%	1,076	46.46%	164	7.08%	2,316
District 23	2,570	46.28%	2,983	53.72%	413	7.44%	5,553
District 24	2,203	40.27%	3,267	59.73%	1,064	19.45%	5,470
District 25	2,126	37.60%	3,529	62.40%	1,403	24.81%	5,655
District 26	1,175	25.63%	3,409	74.37%	2,234	48.73%	4,584
District 27	1,151	26.88%	3,131	73.12%	1,980	46.24%	4,282
District 28	1,397	29.23%	3,383	70.77%	1,986	41.55%	4,780
District 29	1,855	34.74%	3,484	65.26%	1,629	30.51%	5,339
District 30	1,942	34.88%	3,626	65.12%	1,684	30.24%	5,568
District 31	1,752	52.24%	1,602	47.76%	150	4.47%	3,354
District 32	777	38.66%	1,233	61.34%	456	22.69%	2,010
District 33	1,006	26.18%	2,837	73.82%	1,831	47.65%	3,843
District 34	2,470	47.43%	2,738	52.57%	268	5.15%	5,208
District 35	3,373	62.13%	2,056	37.87%	1,317	24.26%	5,429
District 36	2,462	47.19%	2,755	52.81%	293	5.62%	5,217
District 37	1,157	59.79%	778	40.21%	379	19.59%	1,935
District 38	1,490	80.41%	363	19.59%	1,127	60.82%	1,853
District 39	1,507	74.35%	520	25.65%	987	48.69%	2,027
District 40	863	65.13%	462	34.87%	401	30.26%	1,325
Overseas voters	29	90.63%	3	9.38%	26	81.25%	32
Totals	91,265	48.4%	86,024	45.6%	5,241	2.96%	177,289

=== Aftermath and analysis ===
The results were praised by some pundits and activists, with FairVote, a pro-RCV lobbying group, arguing the low number of spoiled ballots proved Alaskans understood how to use the system. Former presidential candidate Andrew Yang said the election served as a model for electing moderate candidates to office, regardless of partisan affiliation.

However, experts in social choice criticized the election procedure for several pathological behaviors, resulting from a phenomenon called a center squeeze. Begich was eliminated in the first round, despite being preferred by a majority of voters to each one of his opponents, with 53% of voters ranking him above Peltola. However, Palin spoiled the election by splitting the first-round vote, leading to Begich's elimination and contributing to Republicans losing the seat. The election was also an example of a no-show paradox, in which a voter's ballot has the opposite of its intended effect (e.g. a candidate losing because they "win too many votes"); Peltola's win was attributable to Palin supporters turning out to rank Peltola in last place, behind both Palin and Begich. Similarly, the election was an example of negative (or perverse) responsiveness, where a candidate loses as a result of having too much support (i.e. being given too high of a rank, or less formally, "winning too many votes").

In the wake of the election, a poll found 54% of Alaskans, including a third of Peltola voters, supported a repeal of RCV. Despite this, a 2024 ballot measure to repeal the RCV system ultimately failed. Observers noted such pathologies would have occurred under Alaska's previous primary system as well, leading some to suggest Alaska adopt a rule without similar behavior.

==== Exhausted ballots ====
Another factor which may have contributed to the outcome was the number of ballots that were retired due to exhaustion or overvoting after Begich was eliminated. Approximately 21% of ballots were retired after Begich's elimination, compared to 2.8% after the elimination of the write-in candidates. The 11,243 voters who did not rank either remaining candidate after Nick Begich was substantially higher than the margin of victory of only 5,140 votes, leading some to argue the result may have been determined by voters who did not understand the system failing to fully rank their ballots. Others argued the exhausted ballots were a deliberate choice by voters who refused to support Palin, with Republican pollster Matt Larkin attributing them to Palin's unpopularity among Begich supporters. Writing in Reason, Joe Lancaster argued that Begich voters had the chance to support Palin but chose not to over concerns about her competence, describing her as a "bad candidate". PolitiFact noted the campaign's negative tone, with Palin and Begich spending much of the election season attacking each other, made it unsurprising that some Begich voters declined to support Palin.

== See also ==
- 2022 United States House of Representatives elections
- 2022 United States elections
- 117th United States Congress
- List of special elections to the United States House of Representatives

== Notes ==
Partisan clients
