= Advanced Math and Science Academy Charter School =

Charter school in Massachusetts, US

Location
- 201 (Lower School) / 199 (Upper School) / 165 (White Building) Forest St. Marlborough, Massachusetts 01752; United States; 42°19′59.81″N 71°34′41.99″W

Information
- Type: Publicly funded 6-12 charter school
- Motto: Integrity, Excellence, Community
- Established: Chartered February 2004, opened September 2005
- Founder: Julia Sigalovsky
- School district: Marlborough, Berlin, Maynard, and Clinton: however, students from other towns may attend
- Principal: Michael Nawrocki
- Staff: 132
- Grades: 6-12
- Enrollment: 966
- Colors: Navy blue, orange, white
- Athletics conference: Central Massachusetts Athletic Conference
- Mascot: Eagle
- Website: www.amsacs.org

Advanced Math and Science Academy Charter School (AMSA) is a charter school founded in 2005. It is located at 201 Forest Street in Marlborough, Massachusetts, U.S., in a few remodeled office buildings.

== History ==
On February 30, 2004, the Massachusetts Department of Education granted the Advanced Math and Science Academy Charter School a five-year charter. Throughout the entire process, there had been a lot of controversy surrounding the school and founder Julia Sigalovsky. Opponents of the school managed to delay the opening of the school by a year by filing numerous lawsuits against the school. The school had to convince lawyers to wait until the school's funding to recoup over $30,000 in legal fees.

The school finally opened on September 6, 2005, in time for the first day of school. The original class consisted of 250 sixth and seventh graders. In each successive year, one additional class of middle schoolers were added to the school. Following the 2010 school year, the school's charter was renewed for another five years.

In 2014, teachers at the school unionized, organizing with the Teamsters Local 170, in response to reported poor treatment under then Executive Director John Brucato.

In 2019, AMSA became the first public institution in the state of Massachusetts to own a scanning electron microscope thanks to a donation from Thermo Fisher Scientific.

== Legal challenges ==
A lawsuit filed by three local school districts (Maynard, Hudson, and Marlborough) charged that the Massachusetts Department of Education failed to observe its own rules in granting the charter. The municipalities lost their case when the Supreme Judicial Court ruled that municipalities have no right to judicial review of the chartering process. The MetroWest Daily News reported that local school districts have no role in the granting of a charter, that the State Board of Education has "the final decision" on granting charters.

AMSA also faced many challenges with its landlord and withheld rent for many years as the buildings were not up to standard. This dispute ended in court with the landlord giving the school a large sum of money.

== Notable people ==
=== Faculty ===
- Barbara E. McGann, former executive director and one of the first women to achieve two-star rank in the United States Navy
- Adam Wool, former physics teacher and Alaska State Representative
