= Pete B. Higgins =

American politician (born 1957)

Pete Higgins

Member of the Alaska House of Representatives from the 5th district
- In office January 18, 2013 – January 20, 2015
- Preceded by: Bill Thomas
- Succeeded by: Adam Wool

Personal details
- Born: October 26, 1957 (age 68) Phoenix, Arizona, U.S.
- Party: Republican
- Education: University of Alaska Fairbanks; Creighton University

Pete B. Higgins (born October 26, 1957) is an American dentist and politician. Higgins was a Republican member of the Alaska House of Representatives from 2013 to 2015, representing District 5.

== Early life and education ==
Pete Higgins was born in Phoenix, Arizona on October 26, 1957, the youngest child of Albert and Onita Higgins. He lived in Phoenix until the family moved to Alaska in 1965, at first living in Anchorage before settling in Fairbanks in 1967, where his parents were involved in owning and running a variety of small businesses throughout the late 20th century. He graduated from Lathrop High School in 1976. He attended University of Alaska Fairbanks and earned his DDS from Creighton University.

== Political career ==
- 2010 Higgins was unopposed for the Senate's D seat August 24, 2010, Republican Primary, and won with 4,756 votes, and challenged incumbent Democratic Senator Joe Thomas in the November 2, 2010 General election, but lost; Senator Thomas held that seat until 2013.
- 2012 Higgins won the District 5 two-way August 28, 2012 Republican Primary with 1,423 votes (51.97%) over Aaron Lojewski with 1,315 votes (48.03%) and won the November 6, 2012 General election with 3,950 votes (53.44%) against Democratic nominee David Watts, who had previously run for the seat in 2006.
- 2014 Higgins was again his party's nominee, but he lost reelection to Democrat Adam Wool of Fairbanks.
