= North Pole, Alaska =

City in Alaska, United States

- City
- City of North Pole
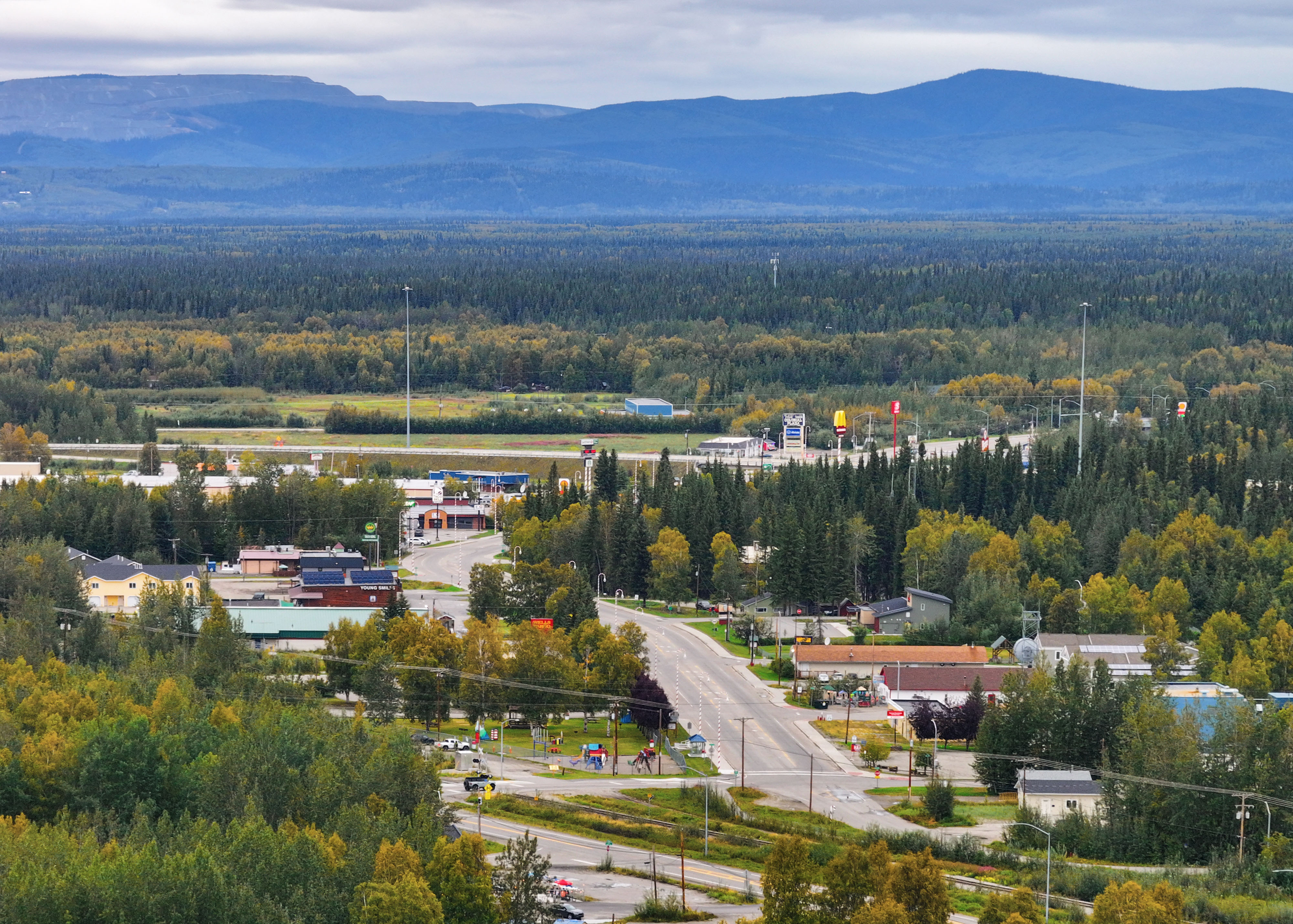
- An August 2026 view of North Pole, looking north towards Santa Claus Lane

- Flag Seal
- Motto: "Where the Spirit of Christmas Lives Year Round!"
- Location within Fairbanks North Star Borough and the U.S. state of Alaska
- Coordinates: 64°45′04″N 147°21′07″W
- Country: United States
- State: Alaska
- Borough: Fairbanks North Star
- Incorporated: January 15, 1953

Government
  - Type: Home rule city
  - Mayor: Larry Terch
  - Borough mayor: Bryce J. Ward
  - State senator: Robert Myers (R)
  - State rep.: Mike Prax (R)

Area
  - Total: 4.10 sq mi (10.62 km^{2})
  - Land: 4.08 sq mi (10.58 km^{2})
  - Water: 0.015 sq mi (0.04 km^{2})
- Elevation: 482 ft (147 m)

Population (2020)
  - Total: 2,243
  - Density: 550/sq mi (212/km^{2})
- Time zone: UTC-9 (Alaska (AKST))
  - Summer (DST): UTC-8 (AKDT)
- ZIP code: 99705
- Area code: 907
- FIPS code: 02-55910
- GNIS feature ID: 1407230
- Website: www.northpolealaska.com

North Pole is a small city in the Fairbanks North Star Borough, Alaska, United States. Incorporated in 1953, it is part of the Fairbanks metropolitan statistical area. As of the 2020 census, the city had a population of 2,243, up from 2,117 in 2010. Despite its name, the city is about 1,700 miles (2,700 km) south of Earth's geographic North Pole and 125 miles (201 km) south of the Arctic Circle.

== Description ==
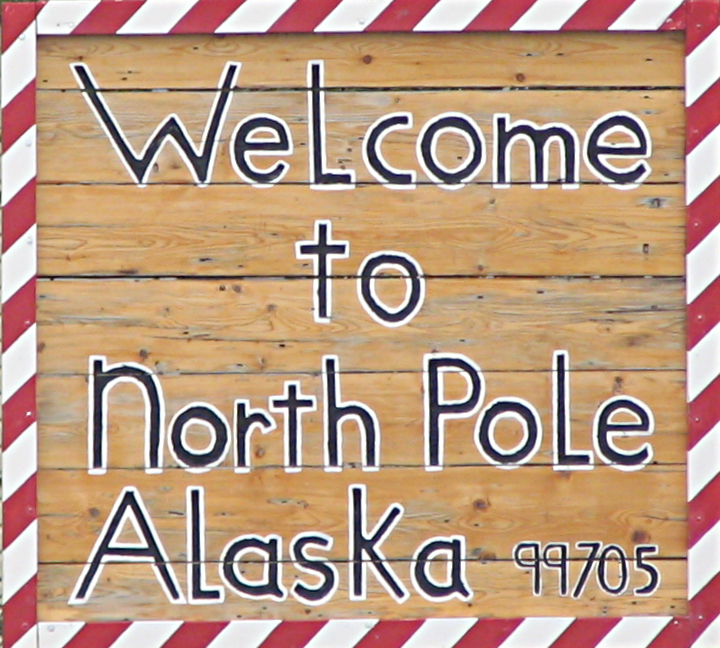
Frequently photographed "Welcome to North Pole" sign at the eastern end of Fifth Avenue, near its intersection with the Richardson Highway.

The city is a summertime attraction for tourists visiting nearby Fairbanks and, due to its location on the Richardson Highway, those traveling to and from the Alaska Highway and Valdez. North Pole was home to two oil refineries, the town's major industry aside from tourism, but closed because of sulfolane contamination in groundwater. The larger refinery, operated by Flint Hills Resources, was a major source of jet fuel for Ted Stevens Anchorage International Airport. Tanker car traffic on the Alaska Railroad, entering and leaving the refinery, frequently bisects the city.

North Pole's biggest attraction is a gift shop named Santa Claus House, the modern-day incarnation of a trading post (gift shop) established in the town's early days. The Santa Claus House is known for the world's largest fiberglass statue of Santa Claus outside. A small group of domesticated reindeer are just outside.

Before Christmas each year, the USPS post office in North Pole receives hundreds of thousands of letters to Santa Claus, and thousands more from people wanting the town's postmark on their Christmas greeting cards to their families. It advertises the ZIP code 99705 as the ZIP code of Santa. A community program also responds to letters addressed to 1 Santa Claus Lane.

Christmas-themed streets in North Pole include Santa Claus Lane, St. Nicholas Drive, Snowman Lane, and Kris Kringle Drive. Street lights in the city are decorated in a candy cane motif, and many local businesses have similar decorations. The city's firetrucks and ambulances are all red, while the police cars are green and white. The city also had an all-female flat-track Roller Derby league, the North Pole Babes in Toyland (NPBT) from 2013 to 2017, whose athletes had Christmas and North Pole-inspired Skater names.

North Pole has some of the least expensive residential real estate in Alaska; the median home price there is $211,184 in 2014.

== History ==
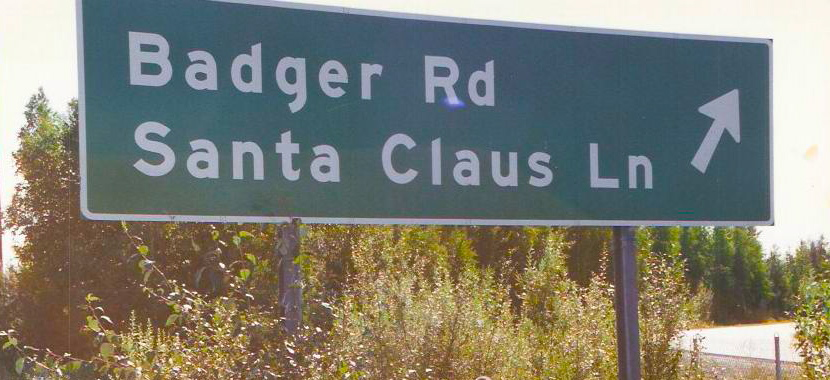
Main exit to North Pole off the Richardson Highway. Badger Road, a loop road off the Richardson between Fairbanks and North Pole, was named for Harry Markley Badger (1869–1965), a pioneer Fairbanks resident who established a farm along the road. Inside North Pole city limits, the road becomes Santa Claus Lane, one of many Christmas-themed streets in the city.

The Richardson Highway south of Fairbanks led to an assortment of subdivided and unsubdivided homesteads between Ladd Field and 26 Mile Field in the 1940s and 1950s.

The area that formed the central city of North Pole was homesteaded in 1944 by Bon V. and Bernice Davis. Their son, T. Neil Davis, wrote Battling Against Success in 1997, a fictionalized account of homestead life. The Alaska Railroad established a siding on the Davis homestead as part of its branch line to Eielson Air Force Base, naming the siding Davis. This name temporarily became associated with the fledgling settlement.

In 1952, Dahl and Gaske Development Company purchased the Davis homestead, subdivided it, and renamed it North Pole, in hopes of attracting a toy manufacturer to the area. The City of North Pole was incorporated on January 15, 1953, from portions of the Davis homestead and the adjacent homestead of James Ford. Ford was named the first mayor, with Everett Dahl serving on the first city council.

Another member of that first council was Conrad B. Miller. Miller, who came to Fairbanks in 1949, opened a trading post along the highway in 1952. The business became known as the Santa Claus House and evolved over the years into the current roadside attraction. The business was also home to North Pole's first post office, serving in that capacity for almost 20 years. Another trading post in the community was operated by Lucius Cunningham and his family. The town's economy largely depended on these two businesses until the 1970s, when the current four-lane Richardson Highway was built, bypassing Davis Subdivision, which was effectively its downtown.

The Earth Resources refinery (now operated by Flint Hills Resources) began operations in August 1977. It is connected to the Trans-Alaska Pipeline System by several feeder pipelines operated by Golden Valley Electric Association, mostly following along the Laurence Road section line. The years after its construction saw the construction of the North Pole Plaza, a large enclosed shopping mall along the Richardson Highway. A standalone high school and increased subdivision development in previously rural areas immediately outside the city followed before the real estate market temporarily collapsed during the 1980s.

An interchange was constructed along the Richardson, where the highway intersects with the eastern end of Badger Road and the northern end of Santa Claus Lane, during the early 1990s. In the late 2000s, the northern portion of Santa Claus Lane was rebuilt to accommodate three consecutive roundabouts, serving the interchange and a nearby frontage road intersection. Another interchange was constructed on the Richardson at Dawson Road, at the far eastern edge of city limits. These improvements eliminated a number of at-grade access points to the Richardson, which had accumulated a decades-long history of serious accidents.

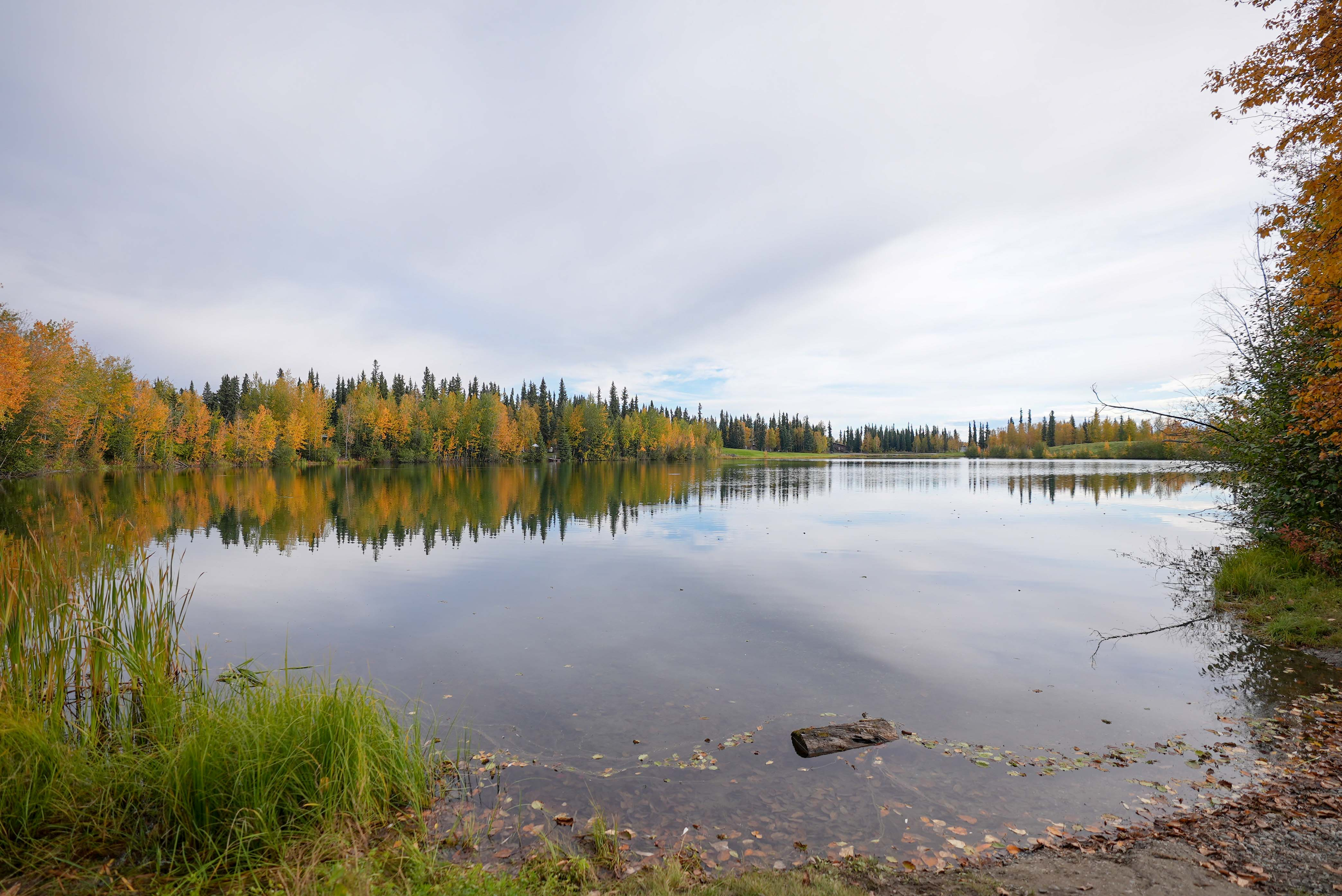
Beaver Lake in North Pole, AK

On April 22, 2006, police arrested several students at North Pole Middle School for allegedly plotting a school shooting. Death in Santaland, a documentary about the town and the foiled school shooting plot, was made by the British journalist Jon Ronson and broadcast on the television channel More 4 in 2007.

The city government has had an often contentious history. A past mayor, Jeff Jacobson, was criticized for maintaining his full-time mayor's job while at the same time working full-time as a teacher at North Pole Middle School. In 2004, Jacobson sent a letter and a lump of coal to U.S. Senator John McCain about a comment he made regarding why the city's "elves" needed money for a recreation project that he considered a pork barrel project.

The current mayor of North Pole is Michael Welch. The city council consists of six members serving staggered three-year terms, with municipal elections held each October. In 2022, the city council consists of Santa Claus (2019–2022), Aino Welch (2020–2023), DeJohn Cromer (2020–2023), David Skipps (2021–2024), and Anton Keller (2021–2024).

In 2014, Americans for Prosperity quickly pulled an ad campaign in Alaska after Koch Industries closed the Flint Hills Resources Refinery in North Pole.

== Geography ==
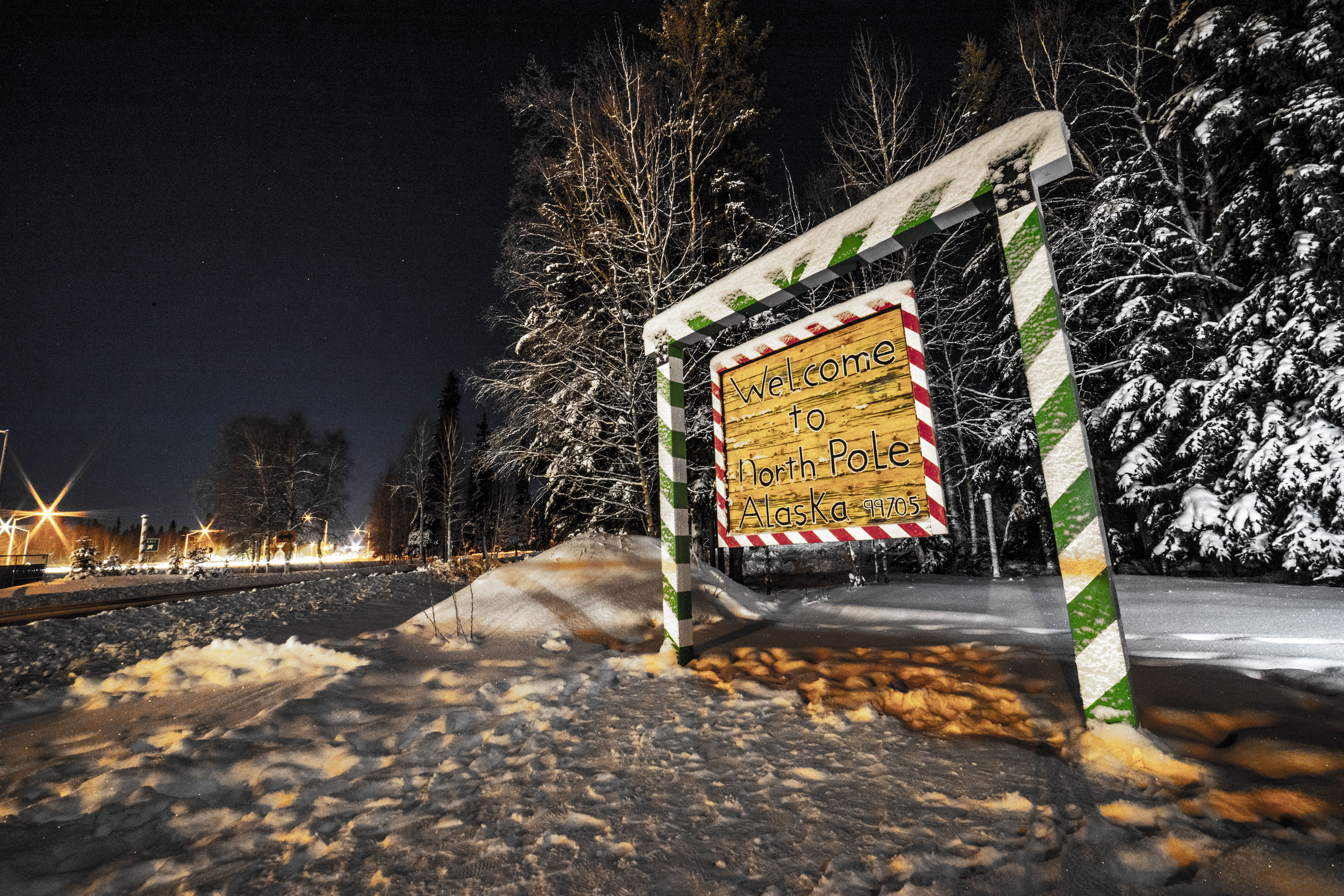
The welcome sign is located at 64.750695, -147.329935

North Pole is located at 64°45′04″N 147°21′07″W (64.75111°N 147.35194°W). It is 13 miles (21 km) southeast of Fairbanks on the Richardson Highway. The city is about 1,700 mi (2,700 km) south of Earth's geographic North Pole.

According to the United States Census Bureau, the city has an area of 4.2 square miles (11 km^{2}), of which 4.2 square miles (11 km^{2}) is land and 0.04 square miles (0.10 km^{2}) (0.47%) is water. The city is to the north and east of the Tanana River, though access to the river is not easy due to the extensive system of levees. Beaver Springs Slough meanders through the heart of the city, emptying into Chena Slough.

North Pole is the recommended city name for all of ZIP Code 99705, which stretches between Fort Wainwright and Eielson Air Force Base, and between the Chena River and the Tanana River, including the census-designated places of Badger, which spans subdivisions connecting the eastern edge of Fairbanks and North Pole, and Moose Creek.

=== Climate ===
Climate chart for North Pole

North Pole has a subarctic climate (Köppen Dfc). Temperatures in North Pole are heavily affected by the amount of sunlight with little seasonal lag effect from solar radiation. Due to being landlocked and protected by mountain ranges from marine influences, North Pole has little seasonal lag and greater seasonal temperature swings than areas along the coast such as Anchorage, with winters that can dip to many tens of degrees below zero Fahrenheit with average lows remaining below 0 from November 5 to March 18, and summers that see many days in the 70s, 80s, and on occasion, even 90s F.

Extreme temperatures range from −67 °F (−55 °C) on January 5–6, 1975 up to 95 °F (35 °C) on June 15, 1969, and June 25, 1983; the record cold daily maximum is −62 °F (−52 °C), set on January 6, 1975, while, conversely, the record warm daily minimum is 66 °F (19 °C) on June 22, 1987. The coldest day of the year averaged −40 °F (−40 °C) in the 2001 to 2020 normals, while the warmest night average was at 59 °F (15 °C). The coldest has been January 1971 with a mean temperature of −36.1 °F (−37.8 °C), while the warmest month was June 2004 at 65.1 °F (18.4 °C); the annual mean temperature has ranged from 20.5 °F (−6.4 °C) in 1975 to 32.1 °F (0.1 °C) in 2019. North Pole has about 238.8 days a year with nighttime temperatures below 32 °F (0 °C), and 114.7 days a year with nighttime temperatures below 0 °F (−18 °C).

Climate data for North Pole, Alaska (1991–2020 normals, (Note: Mean monthly maxima and minima (i.e. the highest and lowest temperature readings during an entire month or year) calculated based on data at said location from 1991 to 2020.) extremes 1968–present)
Month	Jan	Feb	Mar	Apr	May	Jun	Jul	Aug	Sep	Oct	Nov	Dec	Year
Record high °F (°C)	55 (13)	49 (9)	60 (16)	76 (24)	86 (30)	95 (35)	91 (33)	92 (33)	77 (25)	74 (23)	50 (10)	47 (8)	95 (35)
Mean maximum °F (°C)	29.3 (−1.5)	35.6 (2.0)	47.5 (8.6)	62.2 (16.8)	76.3 (24.6)	84.8 (29.3)	85.0 (29.4)	80.3 (26.8)	69.1 (20.6)	54.5 (12.5)	31.0 (−0.6)	29.2 (−1.6)	87.2 (30.7)
Mean daily maximum °F (°C)	−1.6 (−18.7)	11.6 (−11.3)	26.1 (−3.3)	46.3 (7.9)	61.7 (16.5)	71.5 (21.9)	72.6 (22.6)	65.9 (18.8)	54.6 (12.6)	32.9 (0.5)	9.8 (−12.3)	1.8 (−16.8)	37.8 (3.2)
Daily mean °F (°C)	−8.7 (−22.6)	1.5 (−16.9)	13.2 (−10.4)	34.4 (1.3)	49.5 (9.7)	60.1 (15.6)	62.3 (16.8)	56.2 (13.4)	45.0 (7.2)	25.7 (−3.5)	3.1 (−16.1)	−5.1 (−20.6)	28.1 (−2.2)
Mean daily minimum °F (°C)	−15.8 (−26.6)	−8.6 (−22.6)	−0.3 (−17.9)	22.5 (−5.3)	37.2 (2.9)	48.6 (9.2)	52.1 (11.2)	46.6 (8.1)	35.5 (1.9)	18.5 (−7.5)	−3.6 (−19.8)	−12.1 (−24.5)	18.4 (−7.6)
Mean minimum °F (°C)	−48.0 (−44.4)	−38.1 (−38.9)	−28.9 (−33.8)	−4.7 (−20.4)	21.9 (−5.6)	34.4 (1.3)	39.2 (4.0)	30.7 (−0.7)	19.4 (−7.0)	−7.0 (−21.7)	−29.8 (−34.3)	−40.1 (−40.1)	−50.8 (−46.0)
Record low °F (°C)	−67 (−55)	−59 (−51)	−52 (−47)	−32 (−36)	6 (−14)	22 (−6)	31 (−1)	21 (−6)	−1 (−18)	−41 (−41)	−51 (−46)	−62 (−52)	−67 (−55)
Average precipitation inches (mm)	0.48 (12)	0.44 (11)	0.32 (8.1)	0.34 (8.6)	0.66 (17)	1.91 (49)	2.62 (67)	2.61 (66)	1.42 (36)	0.96 (24)	0.61 (15)	0.48 (12)	12.85 (326)
Average snowfall inches (cm)	9.4 (24)	7.2 (18)	5.1 (13)	1.6 (4.1)	0.4 (1.0)	0.0 (0.0)	0.0 (0.0)	0.0 (0.0)	1.6 (4.1)	7.7 (20)	11.8 (30)	9.2 (23)	54.0 (137)
Average precipitation days (≥ 0.01 inch)	6.6	5.0	4.1	2.7	4.4	9.3	10.3	12.7	9.5	7.5	8.0	6.6	86.7
Average snowy days (≥ 0.1 in)	8.6	6.5	5.0	1.5	0.2	0.0	0.0	0.0	1.0	6.9	10.0	8.8	48.5
Source: NOAA

== Demographics ==
Historical population
Census	Pop.	Note	%±
1960	615		—
1970	265		−56.9%
1980	724		173.2%
1990	1,456		101.1%
2000	1,570		7.8%
2010	2,117		34.8%
2020	2,243		6.0%
U.S. Decennial Census

North Pole first appeared on the 1960 U.S. Census as a city, 7 years after it formally incorporated in 1953. The census of 1960 reported a figure of 615, but the 1970 census reported the 1960 figure as 358.

=== 2020 census ===
As of the 2020 census, North Pole had a population of 2,243. The median age was 30.8 years. 27.4% of residents were under the age of 18 and 10.3% of residents were 65 years of age or older. For every 100 females there were 102.6 males, and for every 100 females age 18 and over there were 103.2 males age 18 and over.

99.6% of residents lived in urban areas, while 0.4% lived in rural areas.

There were 859 households in North Pole, of which 36.1% had children under the age of 18 living in them. Of all households, 45.5% were married-couple households, 23.6% were households with a male householder and no spouse or partner present, and 23.1% were households with a female householder and no spouse or partner present. About 27.6% of all households were made up of individuals and 8.1% had someone living alone who was 65 years of age or older.

There were 1,002 housing units, of which 14.3% were vacant. The homeowner vacancy rate was 2.8% and the rental vacancy rate was 15.9%.

Racial composition as of the 2020 census
Race	Number	Percent
White	1,507	67.2%
Black or African American	110	4.9%
American Indian and Alaska Native	138	6.2%
Asian	105	4.7%
Native Hawaiian and Other Pacific Islander	23	1.0%
Some other race	43	1.9%
Two or more races	317	14.1%
Hispanic or Latino (of any race)	168	7.5%

=== 2000 census ===
As of the 2000 United States census, there were 1,570 people, 605 households, and 381 families residing in the city. The population density was 373.6 inhabitants per square mile (144.2/km^{2}). There were 653 housing units at an average density of 155.4 units per square mile (60.0 units/km^{2}). The racial makeup of the city was 81.0% White, 5.7% Black or African American, 3.6% Native American, 2.6% Asian, 0.5% Pacific Islander, 1.2% from other races, and 5.6% from two or more races. Hispanic or Latino of any race were 3.8% of the population.

There were 605 households, of which 38.5% had children under 18 living with them, 47.9% were married couples living together, 11.4% had a female householder with no husband present, and 26.9% were non-families. 26.9% of all households were made up of individuals, and 4.6% had someone living alone who was 65 or older. The average household size was 2.58 and the average family size was 3.19.

In the city, the population was spread out, with 29.8% under the age of 18, 13.2% from 18 to 24, 33.3% from 25 to 44, 18.5% from 45 to 64, and 5.2% who were 65 or older. The median age was 29. For every 100 females, there were 110.7 males. For every 100 females age 18 and over, there were 115.2 males.

The median income for a household in the city was $44,583, and the median income for a family was $54,583. Males had a median income of $32,917 versus $27,240 for females. The per capita income for the city was $21,426. About 6.2% of families and 8.7% of the population were below the poverty line, including 9.0% of those under 18 and 22.6% of those 65 or over.

== Politics ==
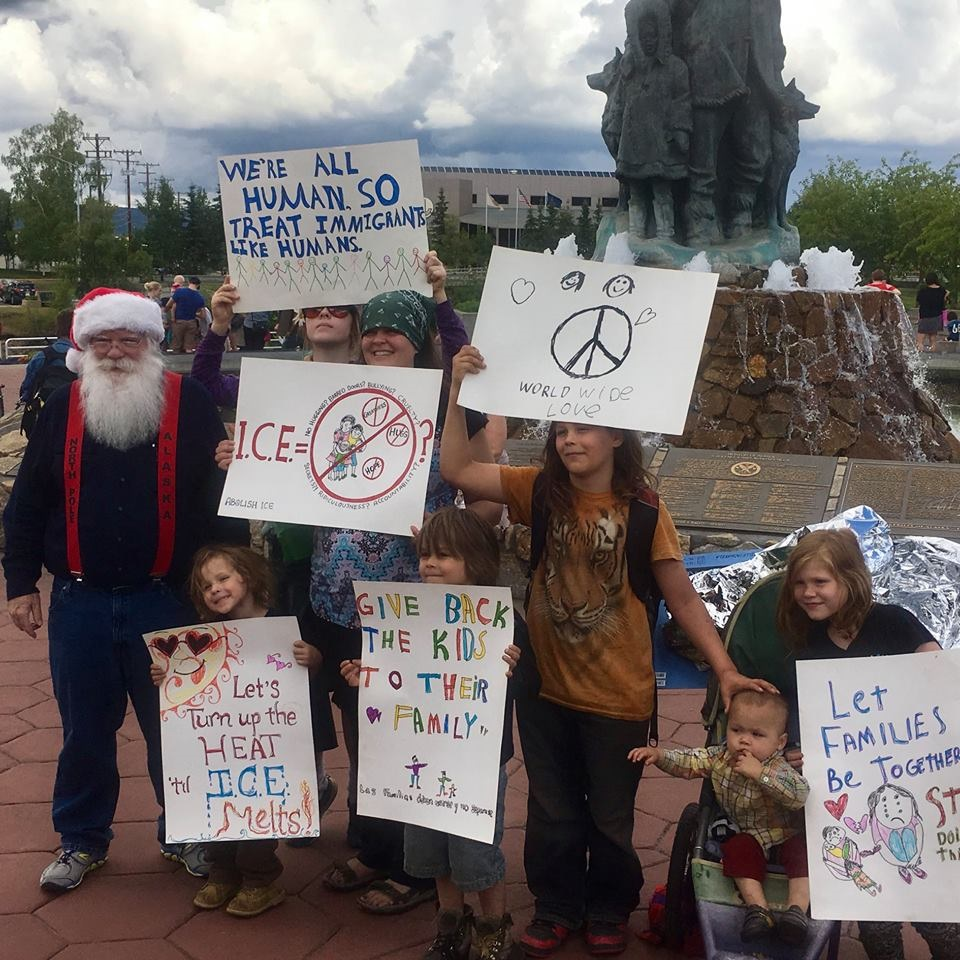
Santa Claus (his legal name, born Thomas O'Connor) was first elected to North Pole's city council in 2015. He appears with a group of children who protested United States immigration policy in downtown Fairbanks in June 2018.

North Pole is the most Republican-leaning area in the Fairbanks North Star Borough. In 2008 House District 11, which comprises the North Pole area, gave John McCain 7,736 votes (78.4% of the total) to Barack Obama's 1,924 (19.5%). In the 2010 gubernatorial election, Republican Sean Parnell received 5,727 votes (76.8%) to Democrat Ethan Berkowitz's 1,451 (19.5%). Republican Joe Miller received 57.3% of North Pole's vote in his failed bid against incumbent U.S. Senator Lisa Murkowski's write-in campaign.

== Education ==
The city is in the Fairbanks North Star Borough School District. North Pole Elementary School, North Pole Middle School, and North Pole High School are within the city limits. The middle and high schools also share an attendance area with students from Midnight Sun Elementary, Ticasuk Brown Elementary, and Two Rivers Elementary.

== Notable people ==
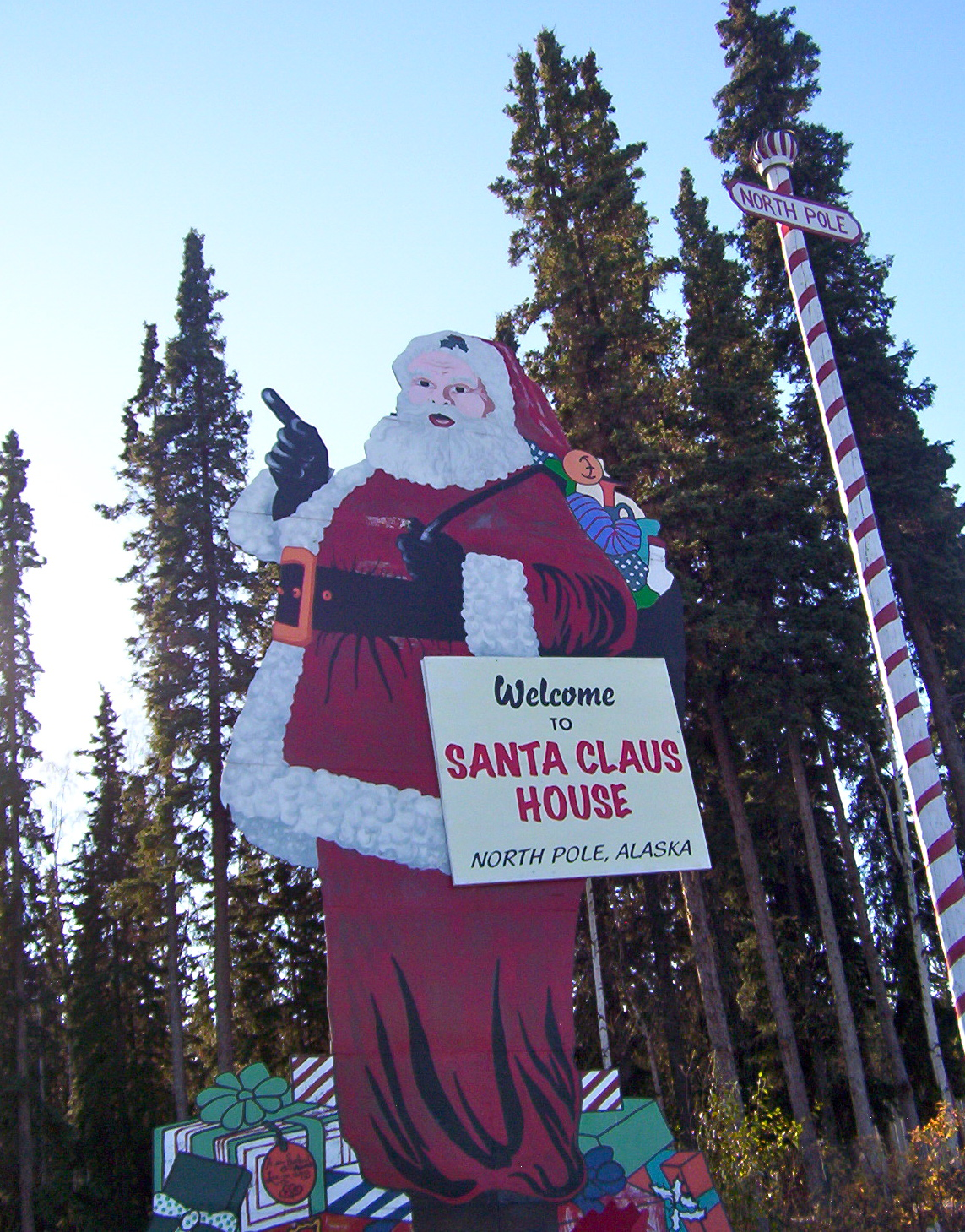
The Santa Claus House is a local landmark.

- Miranda Barbour (born 1994), convicted murderer
- Daryn Colledge (born 1982), NFL guard, was raised in North Pole and graduated from North Pole High School
- Pheonix Copley (born 1992), goaltender for the Los Angeles Kings and formerly the Washington Capitals.
- Terry Miller (1942–1989), entered politics at age 20, serving on the first Fairbanks North Star Borough Assembly. He eventually became president of the Alaska Senate as well as Lieutenant Governor of Alaska from 1978 to 1982 under Governor Jay Hammond
- Mike W. Miller (born 1951), brother of Terry Miller, was also involved in politics, serving for 18 years in the Alaska Legislature and also serving as Alaska's Commissioner of Administration under Governor Frank Murkowski
- Bob Ross (1942–1995), TV painter, stated numerous times during his show that he lived in North Pole for over a decade and that the scenery surrounding the town was of great inspiration for his work
- Lee Shaner (born 1981), better known by his stage name Intuition, American rapper
- Gene Therriault (born 1960), Mike Miller's successor in both the Alaska House of Representatives and the Alaska Senate, Therriault and Miller both served as president of the Alaska Senate
- Santa Claus (born Thomas Patrick O'Connor, 1947), current mayor pro tem and former congressional candidate, known for his likeness and imitation of the legendary figure

== In popular culture ==
- In the Marvel Comics series New Avengers, the town was depicted as destroyed in the Collective story arc published over the course of the spring of 2006.
- The ABC reality show Extreme Makeover: Home Edition built a new house for a local family in one week in July 2006. The episode of the show was used as a premiere to the show's season, and as a kickoff point for the show's plans to rebuild a home in each state.
- In 2007, artist David Choe made North Pole, Alaska his final destination of Thumbs Up!, Season 2.
- Jon Ronson's book, Lost at Sea: The Jon Ronson Mysteries documents the author's journey through the town as he interviews residents about the April 2006 botched middle school shooting.
