= Intuition (rapper) =

American rapper

- Born: Lee Shaner; July 8, 1981 (age 45); North Pole, Alaska, U.S.
- Origin: Los Angeles, California, U.S.
- Genre: Hip-hop
- Occupation: Rapper
- Years active: 2007–present
- Label: Kinda Neat
- Website: itsintuition.com

Lee Shaner (born July 8, 1981), better known by his stage name Intuition, is an American rapper based in Los Angeles, California. He is also the host of the music podcast Kinda Neat.

== Early life ==
Lee Shaner was born on July 8, 1981. He grew up in North Pole, Alaska. At the end of 1990s, he moved to Los Angeles, California.

== Career ==
Intuition released his first solo album, Stories About Nothing, in 2007. In 2009, he collaborated with rapper VerBS for the Buzz EP. His second solo album, Girls Like Me, was released in 2010. It featured a guest appearance from Slug, and it was almost entirely produced by Equalibrum. In 2014, he released Intuition & Equalibrum, a collaborative album with producer Equalibrum.

In 2013, he started the music podcast, Kinda Neat, which features artist interviews and live performances. In 2018, Complex included it on the "25 Essential Podcasts for Music Lovers" list.

== Discography ==
=== Studio albums ===
- Stories About Nothing (2007)
- Girls Like Me (2010)
- Intuition & Equalibrum (2014) (with Equalibrum)
- “Leave a Mark” (2025) (with Equalibrum)

=== Compilation albums ===
- I Ruined These Songs for You (2010)
- I Ruined These Songs for You Too (2011)

=== EPs ===
- Buzz (2009) (with VerBS)

=== Singles ===
- "Sanctuary" (2011)
- "Imagining" (2013) (with Equalibrum)
