= Barbara E. McGann =

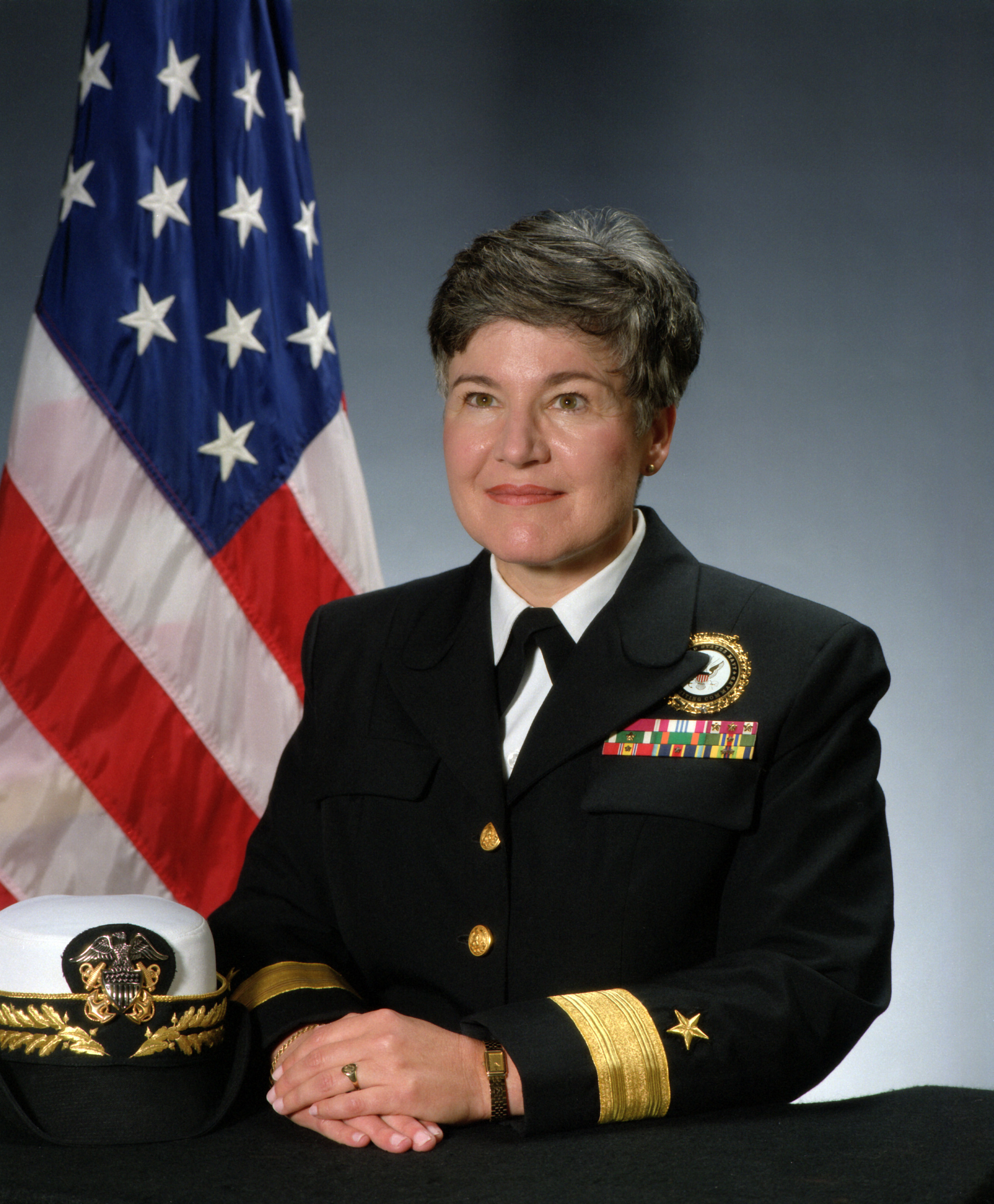
- Barbara E. McGann
- Born: 1946 (age 79–80)
- Military career
- Allegiance: United States
- Branch: United States Navy
- Service years: 1970 – 2002
- Rank: Rear Admiral
- Commands: Naval Support Activity, Holy Loch, Scotland, Navy Recruiting Command
- Awards: Legion of Merit (2 awards); Defense Meritorious Service Medal; Meritorious Service Medal (4 awards); Navy and Marine Corps Commendation Medal (2 awards); Navy and Marine Corps Achievement Medal
- Other work: Executive Director of the American Red Cross of Rhode Island; Assistant superintendent of the Boston Public Schools and CEO of the Marlborough (Mass.) Public Schools; Executive director of the Advanced Math and Science Academy in Marlborough, Mass.

Retired Rear Admiral Barbara Elizabeth McGann (born 1946) was the executive director of the Advanced Math and Science Academy Charter School in Marlborough, Massachusetts until her retirement at the end of the 2010 – 2011 academic year (first graduating class at AMSA). She was one of the first women to achieve two-star rank in the United States Navy.

== Biography ==
Barbara E. McGann is a native of Newport, Rhode Island and earned a Bachelor of Arts Degree in English from the College of Our Lady of the Elms, Chicopee, Massachusetts, and was commissioned as an ensign in the United States Navy through the Officer Candidate School, Newport, Rhode Island in March 1970.

== Naval career ==
McGann's first duty station was Naval Air Station, Meridian, Mississippi, where she was the Public Affairs Officer. She reported to Navy Recruiting District, Los Angeles in 1972, where she served as an Officer Recruiter for two years. In 1974 she was assigned to Headquarters, Navy Recruiting Command, Washington, D.C., as Assistant Director in the Plans and Policy Division. Her next tour was as the assignment officer for junior Surface Warfare Officers at the Bureau of Naval Personnel from 1976 to 1978.

In April 1978, McGann was transferred to the Pentagon to work for the Joint Chiefs of Staff in the Personnel Policy Division. Following that tour, she reported to Navy Recruiting District, Iselin, New Jersey, where she served as the Executive Officer from 1980 to 1982.

After graduation from the Naval War College, Newport, Rhode Island, in November 1983, McGann served as a special assistant to the Secretary of the Navy for Manpower and Reserve Affairs from 1983 to 1985. Her next tour of duty was as an Assignment Officer at Navy Personnel Command from 1985 to 1987.

After promotion to commander, she assumed command of Naval Support Activity, Holy Loch, Scotland, in June 1987. During this time she was designated as a Joint Specialty Officer. After two years in command, Rear Admiral McGann was assigned to the office of the Chief of Naval Operations where she served as Head of Middle East, Africa and South Asia Plans and Policy. In September 1990, she became the Executive Assistant to the Commander, Navy Recruiting Area Eight, San Francisco, California. Following this tour in 1993, McGann taught Strategic Studies as a Fellow at the Naval War College in Newport, Rhode Island.

In June 1994, McGann assumed the rank of rear admiral (lower half) and the duties of Assistant Chief of Naval Personnel for Total Force Programming and Manpower. She became Commander, Navy Recruiting Command in September 1996. In July 1997, she was promoted to rear admiral (upper half). In September 2000, she assumed duties as provost, Naval War College.

After her retirement from the naval service, McGann served as Executive Director of the American Red Cross of Rhode Island, assistant superintendent of the Boston Public Schools and CEO of the Marlborough (Mass.) Public Schools, and was the executive director of the Advanced Math and Science Academy in Marlborough, Mass. She was then the interim superintendent of the Portsmouth School District in Portsmouth, Rhode Island.

== Education ==
In addition to a Bachelor of Arts degree in English from the College of Our Lady of the Elms, Chicopee, Massachusetts, Rear Admiral McGann hold a Master of Science degree in business administration from Salve Regina University, Newport, Rhode Island, and a Master of Arts degree in foreign affairs from Georgetown University, Washington, D.C.

== Awards and decorations ==
Her personal decorations include the Legion of Merit (2 awards), the Defense Meritorious Service Medal, the Meritorious Service Medal (4 awards), the Navy and Marine Corps Commendation Medal (2 awards) and the Navy and Marine Corps Achievement Medal. After her retirement from the Navy, Admiral McGann donated her uniforms and decorations to the Artillery Company of Newport.

== See also ==
- Women in the United States Navy
