= Santa Claus (politician) =

American politician and Anglican monk (born 1947)

The Right Reverend Santa Claus OAC
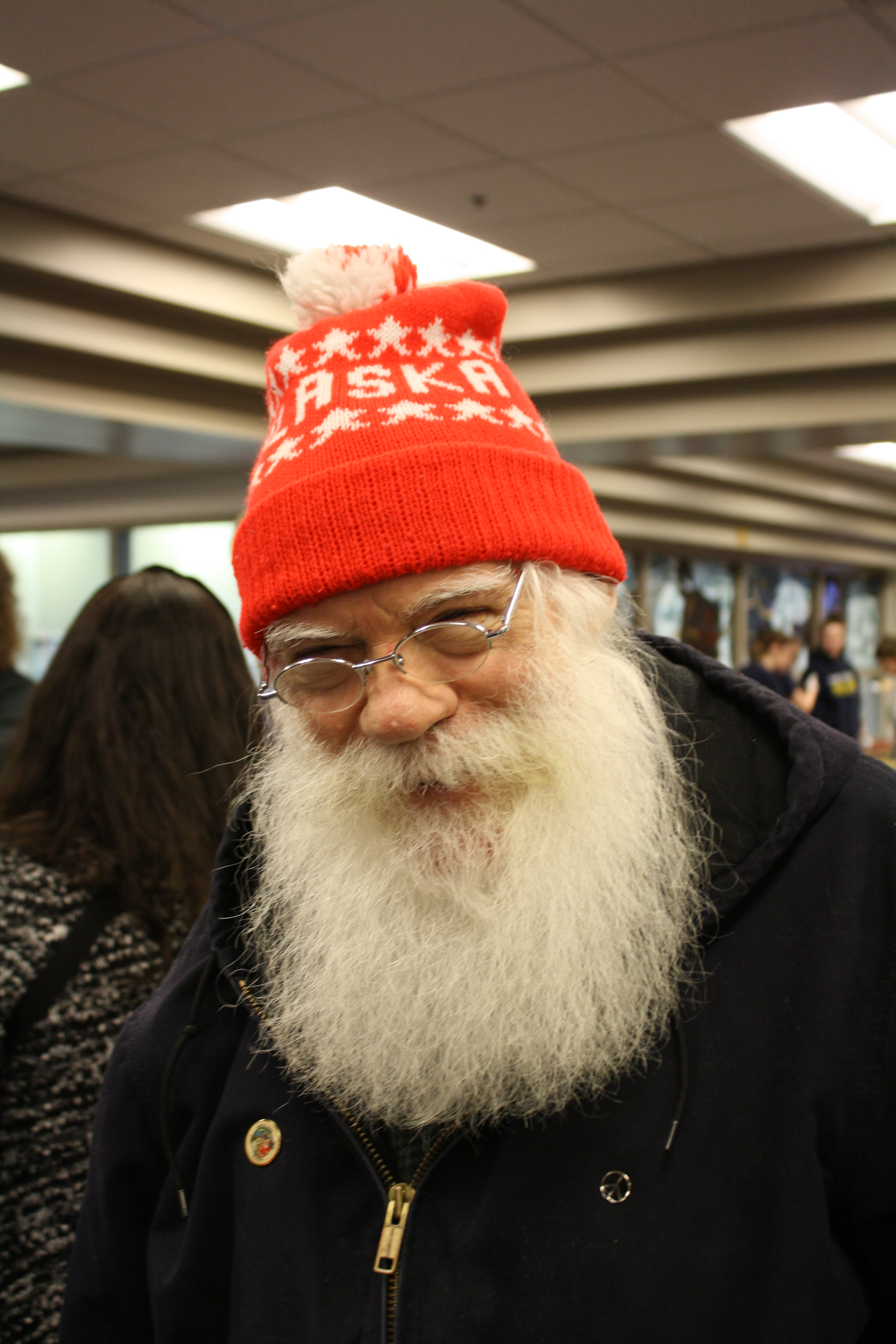
- Claus in 2024

Mayor pro tem of North Pole
- Incumbent
- Assumed office Early 2022

Member of the North Pole City Council
- In office October 2019 – October 2022
- In office October 2015 – October 2018

Personal details
- Born: Thomas Patrick O'Connor; 1947 (age 78–79) Washington, D.C., U.S.
- Party: Independent
- Education: New York University (BA, MA)
- Website: Official website

Santa Claus (born Thomas Patrick O'Connor, 1947) is an American politician, monk, and child welfare activist. Claus gained recognition as a member of the North Pole, Alaska City Council, and was a candidate for the 2022 Alaska's at-large congressional district special election.

In 2005, he changed his name to "Santa Claus" to match the legendary character, to help bring awareness to his advocacy for children's health and welfare, a time during which he engaged in a nation-wide tour to champion that cause. Claus has expanded his advocacy as a congressional candidate into the broader sphere of democratic socialism, including support for Medicare for All, coronavirus relief, a wealth tax, and student loan cancellation.

== Early life and education ==
Claus was born Thomas Patrick O'Connor in 1947 in Washington, D.C. and raised with his three siblings in Manhattan, where his family lived in a three-story brownstone. He studied film at New York University, earning a bachelor's degree in 1971. While he was a student, Claus worked as a bouncer at New York bars and clubs including McSorley’s Old Ale House. He later returned to NYU to earn a graduate degree in educational technology in 1981.

== Career ==
In 1971, Claus began a career in the New York City Police Department as a videographer. He held various positions including special assistant to the deputy police commissioner under Mayor John Lindsay, head of security for the Port Authority, and founding director of a terrorism research group. His approach to studying terrorism focused on underlying issues that led people to become terrorists. Claus has said his ideas were dismissed by national security officials while an appointed member of the Federal Emergency Management Agency's National Defense Executive Reserve.

Jaded with federal government, Claus became chief of safety and security at the United States Virgin Islands territory port, overseeing two international airports and four marine ports. He entered public broadcasting and worked at a radio station in Telluride, Colorado, as vice president of a Lake Tahoe television station, and later served on the Alaska Public Broadcasting Commission. Before becoming a city councillor, Claus also worked as a senior ranger for the Fairbanks North Star Borough at the Chena Lakes Recreation Area.

In the early 2000s, Claus became a Christian monk of the Celtic Episcopalian order Anam Cara. He has worked as an emergency response chaplain.

=== Santa Claus name and child advocacy ===
After growing out his beard in monk tradition, he was compared to Santa Claus and decided to change his name in 2005. When asked in 2015 about his previous name, Tom O'Connor, he said, "I don’t even remember to respond to that anymore".

Claus attributes his interest in child welfare and his democratic socialist values to the "plethora of ills that plague America’s youth" he observed in New York City. He has spent much of his life campaigning to bring greater protections to underprivileged and marginalized children, particularly in the United States. In 2009, for his child welfare advocacy, Claus won the International Peace Prize presented by the Santa Claus Peace Council, a peace-promoting organization based in Antalya, Turkey. Claus ran for president in 2012. He received 625 votes in Maryland. Claus believes legislators engage with him and his ideas more readily because of his name, and the media attention it gets.

=== North Pole City Council ===
In 2013, Claus moved to North Pole, Alaska and became the president of the North Pole Chamber of Commerce. During that time he successfully lobbied Alaska to pass Erin's Law, which trains teachers to recognize signs of child abuse. Claus was elected to the North Pole City Council in 2015 as a write-in candidate, winning with 58 votes. In 2016, Claus spoke out against a proposed ban of marijuana dispensaries in North Pole, successfully swaying his council colleagues to reject the proposition. Claus was re-elected to the council in 2019, with 100 votes. As of 2022, he is the mayor pro tem.

=== 2022 Alaska congressional special election ===
Claus ran in the 2022 Alaska's at-large congressional district special election. He intended to only complete the remainder of Congressman Don Young's term, and made clear that he was not interested in running for the additional full term, to be contested in November 2022. Political analysts noted that campaigning against 'Santa' would be challenging. In spite of this, competing candidate Josh Revak willingly characterized his own campaign as "waging a war on Santa", calling Claus' policies "Marxist fantasies". Claus was among 48 candidates running in the non-partisan June primary, including former Alaskan Governor Sarah Palin, which used ranked-choice voting for the first time. The top four candidates contested the Special General Election on August 16. A poll of 605 voters from Alaska Survey Research in May 2022 placed Claus with approximately 6% of the vote, which would have seen him place fourth, proceeding to the general election. Claus finished in sixth place in the election and subsequently endorsed Democrat Mary Peltola for the general election.

== Political positions ==
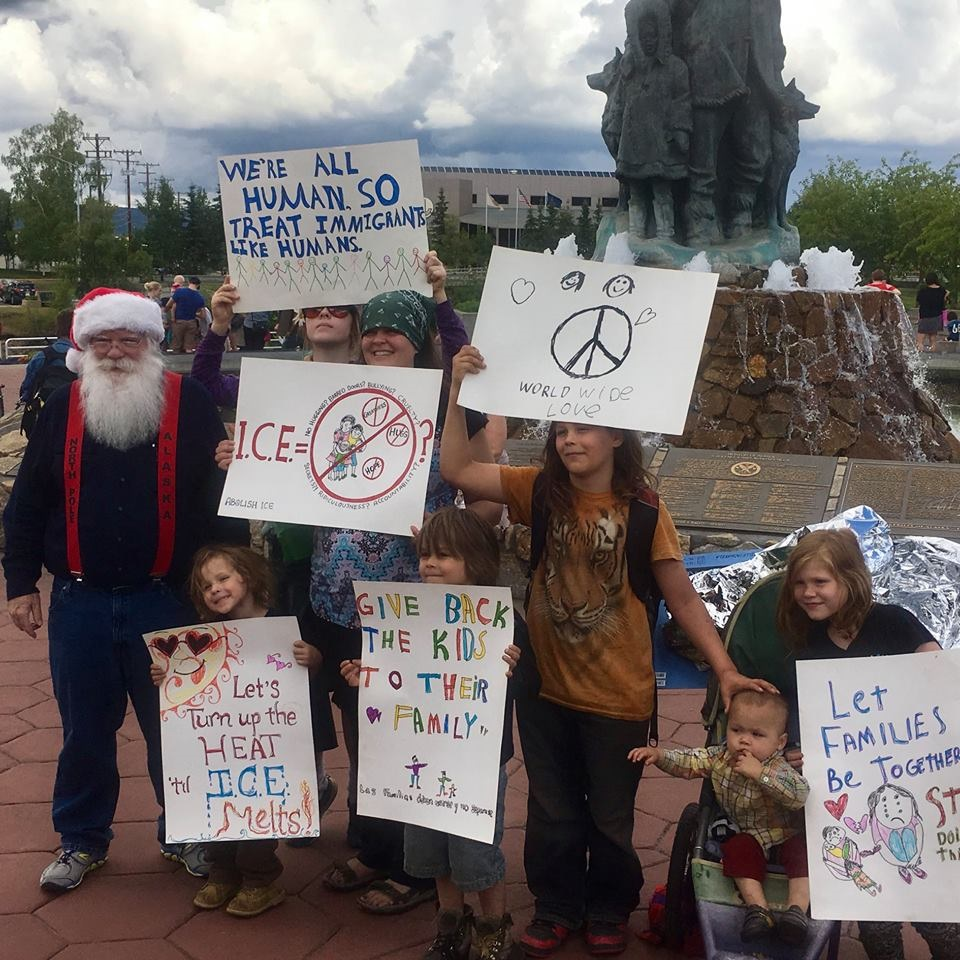
Santa Claus and children protesting against the immigration policies of the first Trump administration in 2018 in Fairbanks, Alaska.

Claus is a proponent of medical marijuana. He describes himself as having a strong affinity with Bernie Sanders, with similar positions on racial justice, corporate accountability, and election freedoms. Claus does not accept corporate donations, nor does he accept personal donations. He supports the expansion of Medicare and the reduction of federal defense spending, describing himself as "fiscally conservative but socially liberal". Claus is in favor of an expanded child tax credit, a wealth tax, and the PRO Act. He has questioned the power and influence of social media companies like Twitter and Facebook. He supports reproductive rights, including the funding of Planned Parenthood, and improving the accessibility of abortions. Claus supported Joe Biden in the 2020 United States presidential election after Bernie Sanders dropped out of the Democratic primary.

Claus has disavowed Alaska's "extractive oil economy", pointing to the effects of climate change and environmental pollution, especially on the Arctic National Wildlife Refuge. He has also vowed to improve Alaska's broadband infrastructure, which is currently underserved in many rural parts of the state.

== Personal life ==
Claus has an adult stepson but is not currently married. He reports that he has had multiple cancers, but has not shared specific diagnoses. Claus sometimes wears his red monk’s robes. As a monk, Claus has taken a religious vow of poverty, making just $300 a month as a North Pole councilman. He reportedly volunteers more than 1,000 hours per year.
