= Adam Wool =

American politician

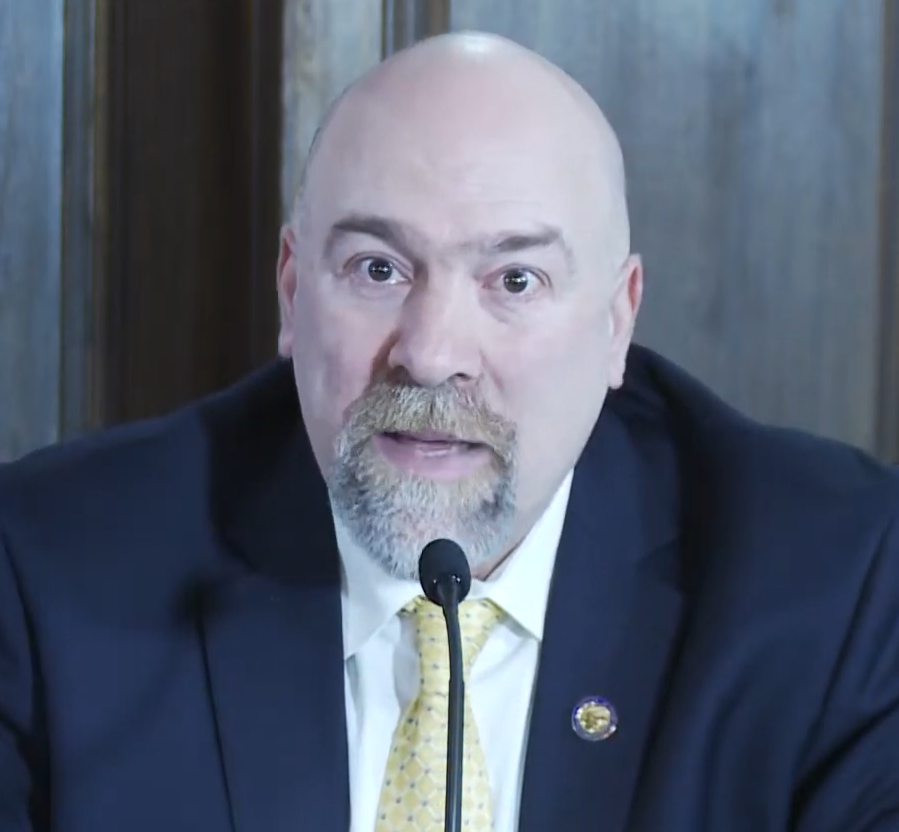
- Adam Wool speaking at a House press conference in February 2017.

Member of the Alaska House of Representatives from the 5th district
- Incumbent
- Assumed office January 20, 2015
- Preceded by: Pete Higgins

Personal details
- Party: Democratic
- Spouse: Kate Wool
- Children: 2
- Education: University of Alaska Fairbanks (BA)
- Occupation: Musician, teacher

Adam Wool is a former American politician who served as a member of the Alaska House of Representatives from District 5. He was a member of the Democratic Party. Wool is now living in his home state after retirement as a physics teacher at the Advanced Math & Science Academy Charter School.

== Career ==
Wool defeated Republican Representative Pete Higgins in 2014, picking up his seat for the Democratic minority.

In 2017, Wool was responsible for pushing legislation through the Alaska House of Representatives removed barriers to the use of ride-sharing apps such as Uber and Lyft in Alaska requested by ride sharing companies.

== Personal life ==
Wool is originally from Boston, Massachusetts. He lived in Fairbanks with his wife (since 2002) Kate and their two daughters, before moving back to Massachusetts.
