= USNS Sgt. George Peterson =

Cargo ship of the United States Navy

History

United States
- Name: Coastal Guide; Washtenaw
- Namesake: Washtenaw County, Michigan
- Ordered: as type (C1-M-AV1) hull, MC hull 2172
- Builder: Leathem D. Smith Shipbuilding Company, Sturgeon Bay, Wisconsin
- Yard number: 338
- Laid down: 9 March 1945
- Launched: 13 May 1945
- Sponsored by: Mrs. L. R. Sanford
- Commissioned: Delivered to the War Shipping Administration (WSA) prior to commissioning, 16 July 1945
- Identification: US Official Number: 248,682

United States
- Name: Coastal Guide
- Owner: MARCOM
- Operator: Polarus Steamship Company, Inc. (1945–1946); United Fruit Company (1946)
- Acquired: 16 July 1945
- In service: 17 December 1945
- Out of service: 22 June 1948
- Fate: Delivered to the Army Transport Service (ATS), 23 June 1948

United States
- Name: Sgt. George Peterson
- Namesake: George Peterson (Medal of Honor), awarded Medal of Honor
- Operator: ATS
- Acquired: 23 June 1948
- Out of service: 1 March 1950
- Identification: Hull symbol: AK-248
- Fate: Transferred to the US Navy, 1 March 1950

United States
- Name: Sgt. George Peterson
- Operator: MSTS
- Acquired: 1 March 1950
- In service: 1 March 1950
- Out of service: 27 March 1959
- Stricken: 1966
- Identification: Hull symbol: T-AK-248
- Fate: Sold, 15 December 1971

United States
- Name: Marsha Lynn
- Owner: John E. Marsh, Brooksville, Florida
- Acquired: 17 February 1972
- Fate: Sold, 1979

United States
- Name: Al-Ind-Esk-A Sea
- Owner: TransAlaska Fisheries Corp., The 13th Regional Corporation
- Acquired: 1979
- Refit: converted to Fish Factory Ship
- Identification: IMO number: 7947386
- Fate: Destroyed by fire, 20 October 1982

General characteristics
- Class & type: Alamosa-class cargo ship
- Type: C1-M-AV1
- Tonnage: 5,032 long tons deadweight (DWT)
- Displacement: 2,382 long tons (2,420 t) (standard); 7,450 long tons (7,570 t) (full load)
- Length: 388 ft 8 in (118.47 m)
- Beam: 50 ft (15 m)
- Draft: 21 ft 1 in (6.43 m)
- Installed power: 1 × Nordberg, TSM 6 diesel engine; 1,750 shp (1,300 kW)
- Propulsion: 1 × propeller
- Speed: 11.5 kn (21.3 km/h; 13.2 mph)
- Capacity: 3,945 t (3,883 long tons) DWT; 9,830 cu ft (278 m^{3}) (refrigerated); 227,730 cu ft (6,449 m^{3}) (non-refrigerated)
- Complement: 15 Officers; 70 Enlisted

USNS Sgt. George Peterson (T-AK-248) was a US Maritime Administration (MARCOM) C1-M-AV1 type coastal cargo ship, originally planned as an Alamosa-class cargo ship. The contract for building was canceled by the Navy in August 1945. The ship, however, was completed as SS Coastal Guide. She was later acquired by the US Army, in 1948, and renamed USAT Sgt. George Peterson. She was reacquired by the Navy, in 1950, and placed in service by the Military Sea Transportation Service (MSTS) as USNS Sgt. George Peterson (T-AK-248). She remained with the Navy until struck in 1966. She was sold in 1971.

== Construction ==
Sgt. George Peterson, originally projected as USS Washtenaw (AK-218), but built as Coastal Guide, was laid down under a MARCOM contract, MC hull 2172, on 9 March 1945 by the Leathem D. Smith Shipbuilding Company, Sturgeon Bay, Wisconsin; launched on 13 May 1945; sponsored by Mrs. L. R. Sanford; and delivered to the War Shipping Administration on 16 July 1945.

== Service history ==
Subsequently, operated by the United Fruit Company and the Polaris Steamship Company, Inc., Coastal Guide was transferred to the US Army on 23 June 1948; renamed Sgt. George Peterson (AK-248). and operated by the Army Transportation Service (ATS).

She was transferred to the Navy in July 1950 and placed in service as USNS Sgt. George Peterson (T-AK-248). The cargo ship then commenced eight years of operations in the Gulf of Mexico, in the Caribbean, and along the southeastern seaboard of the United States for the Military Sea Transportation Service (MSTS). During that period, she interrupted her regular service only once—to carry supplies north to arctic stations in the summer of 1955.

Early in 1959, the AK was ordered inactivated; and, in March, she was placed out of service at New Orleans, Louisiana. At mid-month, she was towed to Mobile, Alabama, where, on the 27th, she was transferred to the US Maritime Administration (MARAD) and berthed with the National Defense Reserve Fleet. She remained in reserve at Mobile until sold for non-transportation use in December 1971.

== Private service ==
On 15 December 1971, she was sold to John E. Marsh, Brooksville, Florida, for $41,000. She was sold under the condition that she wouldn't be used for transportation. She was converted into a private yacht and renamed Marsha Lynn.

In 1979 she was sold to TransAlaska Fisheries Corporation, a subsidiary of The 13th Regional Corporation, and renamed Al-Ind-Esk-A Sea. She was converted into a Fish Factory Ship. On 20 October 1982, she caught fire while undergoing repairs in Port Gardner, Everett, Washington. She burned for two days before rolling over at 10:14 am, 22 October 1982, and sinking in 240 ft (73 m) of water. The owners collected a $14 million insurance claim.

The wreck is located at: 47°59.032′N 122°14.772′W

== Notes ==
Citations

== Bibliography ==
Online resources

- "Sgt. George Peterson". Dictionary of American Naval Fighting Ships. Naval History and Heritage Command. 9 September 2015. This article incorporates text from this source, which is in the public domain.
- "C1 Cargo Ships". www.ShipbuildingHistory.com. 28 August 2009.
- "USNS Sgt. George Peterson (T-AK-248)". NavSource. 20 May 2016.
- "Coastal Guide". United States Department of Transportation. Archived from the original on November 4, 2016.
- Muhlstein, Julie (25 October 2012). "Remembering the sunken ship, the Al-Ind-Esk-A Sea". Everett, Washington: HeraldNet.
- Boyd, Scott. "Wreck of the Al-Ind-Esk-A-Sea". Emerald Sea Photography.
