= Central Council of the Tlingit & Haida Indian Tribes of Alaska =

Tribal entity based in Juneau, Alaska

- Formation: 1935
- Headquarters: Juneau, Alaska, U.S.
- Website: tlingitandhaida.gov

The Central Council of the Tlingit & Haida Indian Tribes of Alaska (CCTHITA) is a United States federally recognized Tlingit and Haida Alaska Native tribal entity based in Juneau, Alaska. It is a federally recognized regional tribe in Alaska, and recognizes 21 "community council chapters", 19 of which are in Southeast Alaska, and the remaining three of which are in Anchorage, Seattle, and San Francisco. The tribal government was established in 1935, and as of 2025 claims to represent 38,000 Tlingit and Haida citizens.

== History ==
=== Pre-recognition ===
Prior to federal recognition, Tlingit and Haida organizational leadership both drew from and "was modeled after the Alaska Native Brotherhood (ANB) and Alaska Native Sisterhood (ANS)"; membership was largely drawn from communities with active ANB and ANS chapters. These communities included Angoon, Craig, Douglas, Haines, Hoonah, Hydaburg, Juneau, Kake, Kasaan, Ketchikan, Klawock, Klukwan, Petersburg, Saxman, Sitka, Tenakee, Wrangell, and Yakutat. It was through affiliation with the ANB and ANS that Tlingit and Haida communities became interested in land claims.

=== Federal recognition ===
In June 1935, the Jurisdictional Act of June 19, 1935 (49 Stat. 388) passed, which:

"[authorized] the Tlingit and Haida Indians of Alaska to bring suit in the United States Court of Claims, and [conferred] jurisdiction upon said court to hear, examine, adjudicate, and enter judgement upon any and all claims which said Indians may have, or claim to have, against the United States, and for other purposes".

The act authorized a community settlement regarding claims of land for which the Tlingit and Haida had not been compensated, and requested that:

"each tribal community shall prepare a roll of its tribal membership, which roll shall be submitted to a Tlingit and Haida Central Council for its approval. The said council shall prepare a combined roll of all communities and submit it to the Secretary of the Interior for approval."

Thus, the name of the Central Council was derived from the wording of the act, specifically the mention of a "Tlingit and Haida Central Council". The first meeting of the Tlingit and Haida Indians of Alaska took place in Wrangell following the passage of the act, with elected delegates being sent from every Southeast Alaskan community with Tlingit or Haida residents. The Central Council, as outlined by the 1935 act, was formed by the ANB in 1939. In 1941, the Central Council adopted a constitution and selected a delegate to represent the group in regards to land claims. By 1941, 18 Tlingit and Haida communities were represented in the Central Council.

The Central Council met informally for much of the 1940s and 1950s, convening occasionally as their land suit, filed in 1947, progressed. On October 7, 1959, the U.S. Court of Claims ruled that CCTHITA was entitled to compensation for lands taken by the U.S. government. Following the suit, the Central Council met in 1960 to begin developing a tribal census.

=== Organization as a tribal government ===
In the following years, the Central Council began to expand its jurisdiction beyond the responsibilities entailed in the 1935 act. In 1963, the council established a committee "to develop a plan for the use of the judgment award". Other members and delegates of the council lobbied for amendments to the 1935 act to allow for organizational changes and to "approve per capita distributions". In 1965, with backing from the U.S. Department of the Interior, Congress passed amendments allowing for the Central Council to organize itself as a tribal government. These amendments also allowed the Central Council to "[become] the vehicle for the award on behalf of individual enrollees," resolving an earlier conflict in which the federal government had not recognized all Tlingit and Haida communities as eligible to receive land compensation. In 1968, the U.S. Court of Claims granted CCTHITA $7.5 million as compensation for lost lands; the court did not grant compensation for lost fishing rights, which had been valued at $8.3 million. The Central Council continued to support other claims leading to the establishment of ANCSA.

== Enrollment ==
As of 1966, enrollment in CCTHITA was open "to all persons of Tlingit or Haida blood residing in the U.S. or Canada who were Alaska residents on or prior to June 19, 1935, or were descendants of such residents of Indian blood".

== Government activity ==
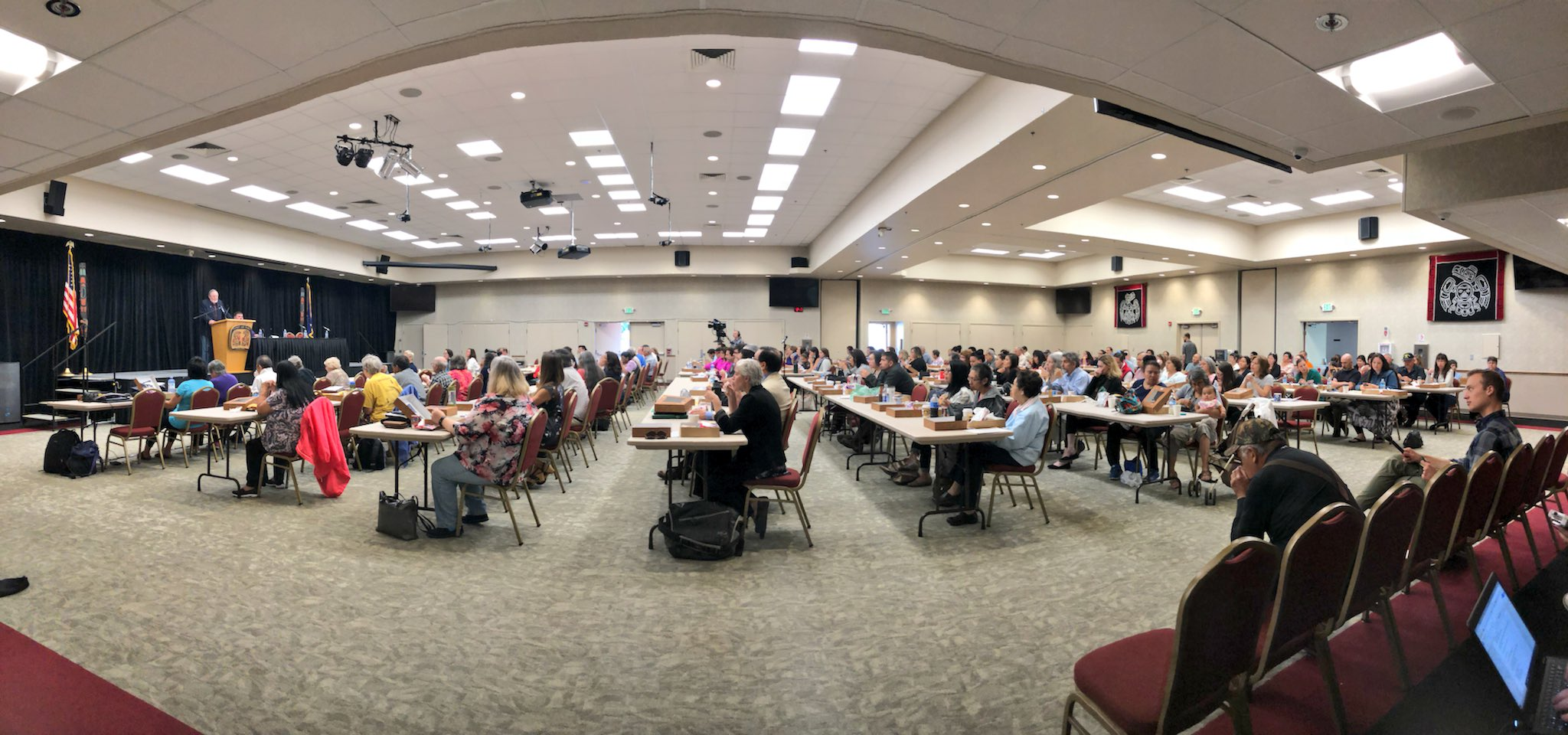
Don Young speaks at a meeting of the organization in August 2018

The stated mission of the tribal government is to "preserve our sovereignty, enhance our economic and cultural resources, and promote self-sufficiency and self-governance for our citizens".

=== Affiliations ===
In February 2023, CCTHITA signed a co-stewardship agreement with the U.S. Forest Service regarding the Mendenhall Glacier Recreation Area.

CCTHITA developed a relationship with the Alaska Federation of Natives in the 1960s. They withdrew from the group in 2023.

=== Tribal assembly ===
The tribal government meets annually, with delegates representing the 21 CCTHITA communities. During the assembly, elections are held to "vote for the Tribe's president, officers in the Tribe's executive council, tribal court judges and an emerging leader," and resolutions are submitted to shape tribal responses to various issues. As of 2021, the assembly had 119 delegates. In 2025, the tribal assembly agreed to shift its proportioning of delegates to allow greater representation to smaller communities in Southeast Alaska. In 2020, 2021, and 2022, the tribal assembly was held virtually due to the COVID-19 pandemic.

In 2021, the tribal assembly passed a resolution to develop a tribal campus in Juneau.

In February 2022, the tribal government opened an office in Anchorage, the first office outside of Southeast Alaska. In 2023, an office was opened in Washington, where they estimated more than 8,200 tribal citizens live.

In 2024, plans for an educational campus were announced.

=== Services ===
By 2013, CCTHITA operated ten Head Start programs across Southeast Alaska, four of which were in Juneau.

From 2022 to 2024, CCTHITA organized distribution of traditional foods ("herring eggs, salmon and black cod") to its recognized communities, with funding from the USDA, to encourage self-sufficiency and lessen reliance on imported food from the contiguous United States. The program was cancelled in 2025 after the USDA cut the program's funding.

== Repatriation efforts ==
In 2011, the Virginia Museum of Fine Arts repatriated a Kingfisher Fort Headdress, dated to the late 19th or early 20th century, to the Lúkaaxh.ádi clan of the Tlingit tribe after CCTHITA issued a claim for the item "as an object of 'cultural patrimony'". The headdress was the first item repatriated by the museum under NAGPRA.

In 2016, the National Park Service gave CCTHITA an $88,000 grant to assist in repatriation efforts.

In 2018, a CCTHITA delegation reviewed the American Indian collection of the Northwest Museum of Arts and Culture in Spokane, Washington. The delegation identified 16 items available for repatriation under NAGPRA, which were subsequently returned to CCTHITA. As of 2024, CCTHITA is reviewing the collection of the Denver Art Museum.

== Courts ==
In 1989, the CCTHITA tribal assembly authorized a tribal court, but said court was not established until 2007, and was based in Juneau. By 2017, the court had "between 900 and 1,000 open cases," with 85% of cases involving child support. Although the court did not deal with criminal cases as of 2017, they did have an agreement with the Alaska state courts "to make sentencing recommendations in some cases involving tribal members".

In February 2015, CCTHITA authorized its courts to perform same-sex marriages, deciding "to define legal marriage without a gender requirement".

In March 2016, the Alaska Supreme Court ruled that the CCTHITA court could exercise specific jurisdiction on non-tribal members in the cases of CCTHITA children whose parents were not enrolled with CCTHITA. This decision elaborated on the 1981 U.S. Supreme Court case Montana v. United States, which established that tribal governments could exercise jurisdiction over non-tribal members only if nonmembers entered "consensual relationships with the tribe or its members, through commercial dealing, contracts, leases, or other arrangements".

In 2017, the court was studied and advised by the National Council of Juvenile and Family Court Judges, to help improve the court system, codes, and procedures.

== Logo ==
The logo used by CCTHITA, which depicts an eagle and a raven in Northwest Coast style, was created by Haines artists Nathan Jackson and John Hagen in the 1960s.

== List of tribal presidents ==
- David Morgan (1935-1940)
- Andrew Percy Hope (1940-1966)
- Ted Denny (1966-1967)
- John Borbridge Jr. (1967-1972)
- Clarence Jackson Sr. (1972-1976)
- Raymond E. Paddock Jr. (1976-1980)
- Andrew "John" Hope Jr. (1980-1984)
- Edward K. Thomas (1984-2007)
- William Martin (2007-2010)
- Edward K. Thomas (2010-2014)
- Chalyee Éesh Richard Peterson (since 2014)
