= Alice E. Brown =

Native American activist and tribal leader (1912-1973)

- Born: Alice Elissa Hedberg; May 11, 1912; Kenai, District of Alaska
- Died: February 1, 1973 (aged 60); Anchorage, Alaska
- Occupations: Native American activist and tribal leader
- Known for: Pressing for passage of the Alaska Native Claims Settlement Act

Alice E. Brown (May 11, 1912 – February 1, 1973) was a member of the Kenaitze Tribe of Dena'ina peoples, who worked for Native Alaskan rights. She was involved in defending the rights of Alaska Natives and disenfranchised groups in Alaska. She was the only woman to serve on the original Alaska Federation of Natives' Board of Directors and pressed for passage of the Alaska Native Claims Settlement Act. Brown was posthumously inducted into the Alaska Women's Hall of Fame in 2010.

== Biography ==
Alice Elissa Hedberg was born on May 11, 1912, in Kenai, District of Alaska, several months before the creation of the Territory of Alaska. Her parents were Anastasiia Nutnal'ta (known also as Nancy) and John Hedberg (known as Moosemeat John), and she was a member of the Kenaitze Indian Tribe. In the 1930s, she married Elmer Brown, and they raised their family in Anchorage.

Brown served her community in various capacities, including as a field representative of the Kenaitze Indian Association and as a member of the Rural Affairs Commission, Greater Anchorage Area Borough Advisory Health Board, and the National Congress of American Indians (NCAI). In 1966, when the Alaska Federation of Natives was founded, Brown was the only woman appointed as a member of the Board of Directors. In 1967, Brown was appointed by Governor Walter Hickel to serve on the Task Force on Land Claims. The committee made their recommendations in 1968 and requested hearings to be held to approve distribution of land in fee simple to native villages with protected hunting and fishing rights for 100 years, shares in mineral rights to be paid to natives for specified lands and the organization of business corporations to disburse funds for tribal interests. Main opposition to the recommendations came from miners, but hearings in the Senate commenced before the year was out. In 1969, Brown went with other native leaders to testify before the House. Her testimony focused on the plight of urban natives, who until that time had to return to their native villages for any social services provided based on their indigenous status. The following year, she was selected as chair of the Alaska Native Political Education Committee.

Finally, in 1971, the Alaska Native Claims Settlement Act was passed and signed into law. Brown was selected to attend the 1972 United Nations Conference on the Human Environment in Stockholm, Sweden, but could not attend due to poor health. She died on February 1, 1973, in Anchorage, Alaska.

Posthumously, in 2000, a collection of manuscripts and archival materials about her and her father was donated to the Anchorage Museum Atwood Resource Center by John "Eddy" Brown. In 2009, Brown's personal papers regarding her work on land rights issues were donated to the University of Alaska by her granddaughter, Rebecca Lyon. In 2010, she was inducted into the Alaska Women's Hall of Fame.
