= Alaska Native Allotment Act =

United States legislation

- Long title: An Act Authorizing the Secretary of the Interior to allot homesteads to the natives of Alaska
- Enacted by: the 59th United States Congress
- Effective: May 17, 1906

Citations
- Public law: Pub. L. 59–171: 34
- Statutes at Large: 34 Stat. 197

Legislative history
- Signed into law by President Theodore Roosevelt on May 17, 1906

Major amendments
- Alaska Native Claims Settlement Act

The Alaska Native Allotment Act of 1906 (34 Stat. 197) granted land ownership rights to individual Alaska Natives. The act, which predated the more comprehensive Alaska Native Claims Settlement Act (ANCSA) of 1971, was an early attempt by the United States government to address land rights for indigenous peoples in Alaska.

== Background ==
Before the Alaska Native Allotment Act, the land rights of Alaska Natives were largely unresolved. The United States had purchased Alaska from Russia in 1867, but for decades afterward, the aboriginal land claims of Alaska's indigenous peoples remained uncertain. As non-Native settlers began to arrive in greater numbers, conflicts over land use and ownership intensified, prompting the need for legislative action.

== Provisions ==
=== Land allocation ===
The law empowered the Secretary of the Interior to allocate land to individual Alaska Natives. Under this provision, eligible individuals could receive up to 160 acres (0.65 km^{2}) of land. The act stipulated specific conditions for the land to be allotted. It had to be vacant, unappropriated, and unreserved non-mineral land, ensuring that it was available for distribution and did not infringe on existing claims or mineral rights. The land was issued in restricted fee title, a unique form of ownership that limited the allottee's ability to sell or transfer the property without Congressional authorization. This restriction was designed to protect Alaska Natives from losing their land through unfair deals or economic pressures. Additionally, to further safeguard the interests of the allottees, the act exempted these lands from taxation. This tax-exempt status was crucial in ensuring that Alaska Natives could maintain ownership of their allotments without the burden of property taxes, which might have been challenging for many to pay given the subsistence lifestyle common among Alaska Natives at the time.

=== Eligibility ===
To qualify, an applicant had to be an Alaska Native, a term encompassing Indians, Aleuts, and Eskimos. This requirement recognized the act's intent to address land rights specifically for indigenous peoples of Alaska. Age restrictions were also in place, with eligibility limited to those who were at least twenty-one years old or held the status of head of a family. Additionally, the act stipulated that applicants must be residents of Alaska. Perhaps the most significant requirement was the demonstration of land use. Applicants needed to prove "substantially continuous use and occupancy of that land for a period of five years."

=== Land selection ===
Eligible individuals could select one or more parcels of land, totaling up to 160 acres. The land could be chosen in up to four separate parcels to accommodate the traditional subsistence lifestyle of many Alaska Natives.

=== Federal oversight ===
The federal government retained legal title to the land as trustee for the allottee, with the allottee holding beneficial or usufruct title.

=== Restrictions on alienation ===
The allotments were issued with restrictions on alienation, meaning they could not be sold, leased, or otherwise encumbered without approval from the Bureau of Indian Affairs.

=== Mineral rights ===
The act specified that no mineral rights could pass to Alaska Native applicants, reserving these rights for the federal government.

== Application process ==
The application process required applicants to provide evidence of use and occupancy of the land. This often involved creating hand-drawn maps or tracings of quadrangle maps to locate the property in question, as much of Alaska was unsurveyed at the time.

== See also ==
- Alaska Native Claims Settlement Act
- Outline of United States federal Indian law and policy
