= John Borbridge Jr =

John Borbridge, Jr. (1927 – May 10, 2016) (Tlingit name: Duk saa.aat) was a Tlingit leader of the Raven L’Uknax.ádi (Coho clan) from the Frog House and Wooshkeetaan yadi who played a prominent role in the Alaska Native Claims Settlement Act (ANCSA).

Borbridge was born in Juneau, Alaska. He attended Sheldon Jackson College and later obtained his Bachelor of Arts degree from University of Michigan and did graduate work at the University of Washington in Seattle. He worked as a teacher and coach at Sheldon-Jackson High School in Sitka and Juneau-Douglas High School for six years before taking on leadership and advocacy roles in Tribal Governance and Native Land rights.

He served six years (1967–72) as President of the Central Council of the Tlingit & Haida Indian Tribes of Alaska. In this capacity he provided public testimony on H.R.14212 during Alaska Native Claims Settlement Act (ANCSA) hearings in Anchorage and Fairbanks, Alaska.

In 1975, Borbridge was asked by South Dakota Senator James Abourezk to serve on the American Indian Policy Review Commission. The commission was allocated a 2 million dollars to conduct a study and put forth recommendations for overhauling federal policies related to Indian country. The commission's findings (American Indian Policy Review Commission Final Report Submitted to Congress May 17, 1977) included the concerns and recommendations for policy changes based on extensive public testimony collected by commission task forces.

In a 1985 interview, Borbridge referred to Alaska Native Corporations as, "corporations with a conscience, with a soul.''

Borbridge was awarded an honorary Doctor of Laws from the University of Alaska Southeast in 2012 in recognition of his lifetime advocacy for Alaska Native issues.
