= Emil Notti =

American engineer, businessman and activist (born 1933)

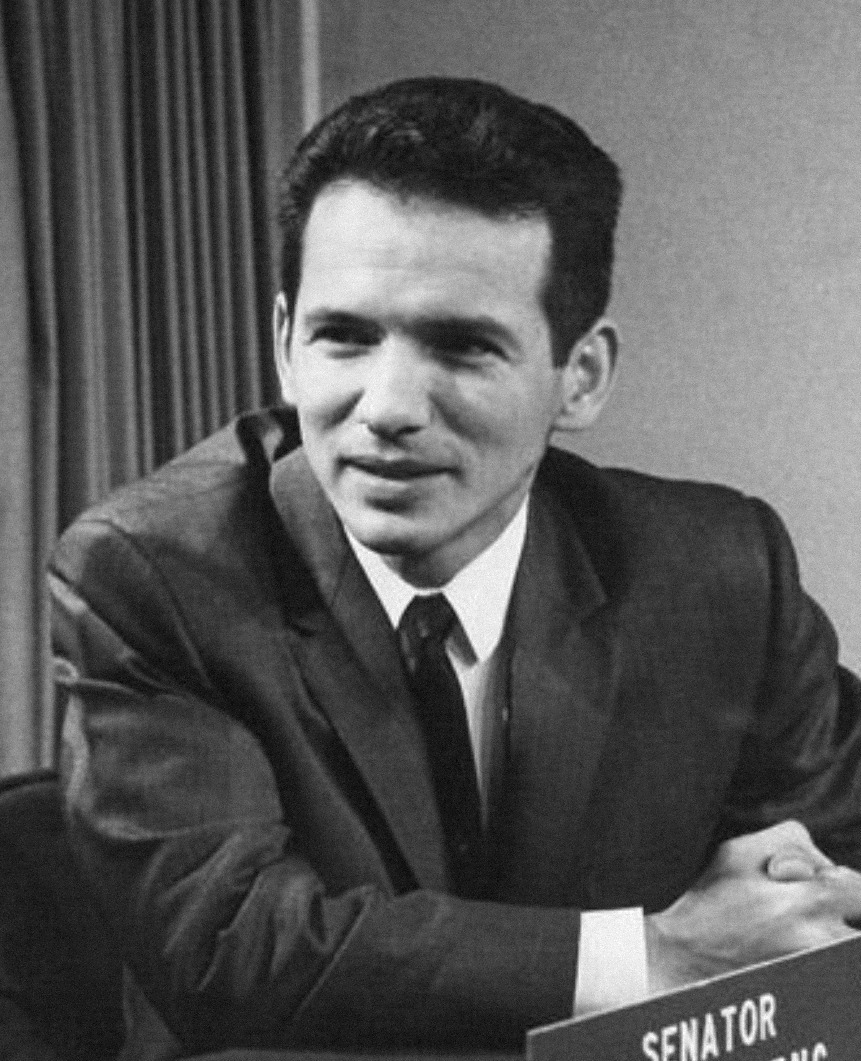
- Notti in 1969

1st President of the Alaska Federation of Natives
- In office 1967–1970
- Preceded by: Office established
- Succeeded by: Don Wright

Personal details
- Born: Emil Reynold Notti; March 11, 1933 (age 92) Koyukuk, Alaska, U.S.
- Party: Democratic
- Education: Northrop University (BS)
- Occupation: Engineer; activist; government official; businessman; political candidate

Emil Reynold Notti (born March 11, 1933) is an American engineer, Indigenous activist, businessman, government employee, and political candidate of Koyukon Athabaskan heritage.

== Early life and education ==
Born in Koyukuk, Alaska, Notti earned a Bachelor of Science degree in aeronautical and electrical engineering from the now-defunct Northrop University in Inglewood, California. He holds honorary doctorate degrees from both Alaska Pacific University and the University of Alaska Anchorage. Notti served in the United States Navy during the Korean War.

== Career ==
Notti aided in developing the Alaska Native Claims Settlement Act (ANCSA) signed into law by President Richard Nixon on December 18, 1971, constituting at the time the largest land claims settlement in United States history. ANCSA was intended to resolve long-standing issues surrounding aboriginal land claims in Alaska and could, perhaps, be considered an ending of more than a century of endeavor by the Native people of the state to secure their land, as well as to stimulate economic development throughout Alaska. Notti was the first President of the Alaska Federation of Natives and Doyon's third President, a regional corporation that owns 12.5 million acres (51,000 km^{2}). Notti worked for Autonetics, a division of North American Aviation, on the LGM-30 Minuteman during the Cold War. Later, he served under several Alaska Governors as Deputy Commissioner of Health and Social Services, Commissioner of Community and Regional Affairs and Commissioner of Commerce, Community and Economic Development. Notti served under Bill Sheffield, and Sarah Palin. Notti served on numerous boards, including the National Bank of Alaska (acquired by Wells Fargo), the Alaska Railroad, a two time Board of Trustees for APFC (the United States' largest Sovereign Wealth Fund with $75 billion under management), and Cook Inlet Regional, Inc.

Notti was the Democratic nominee for the 1973 Alaska's at-large congressional district special election, losing narrowly to Don Young.

=== AFN and ANCSA ===
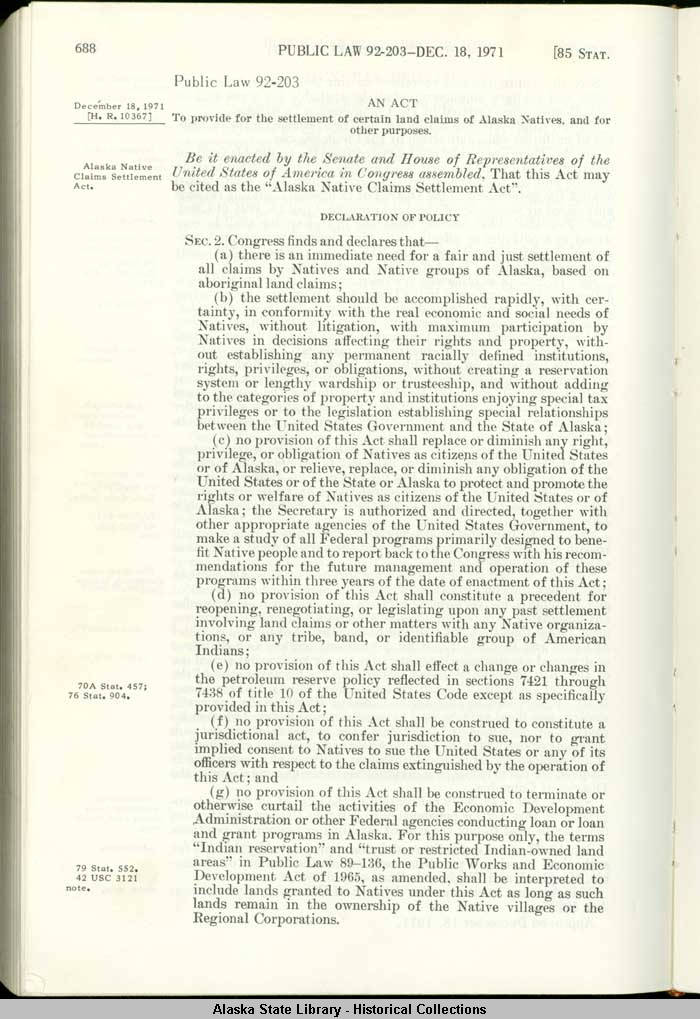
An act to provide for the settlement of certain land claims of Alaska Natives, and for other purposes.

In 1966, Notti called for a Statewide meeting inviting numerous leaders around Alaska to gather and create the first meeting of a committee. The meeting was held October 18, 1966—on the 99th anniversary of the transfer of Alaska from Russia. Notti presided over the three-day conference as it discussed matters of land recommendations, claims committees, and political challenges the act would have getting through Congress.The growing presence and political importance of Natives were evidenced when association leaders were elected to the legislature. Members of the association gathered and were able to gain seven of the sixty seats in the legislature. When the group met a second time early in 1967, it emerged with a new name, The Alaska Federation of Natives, and a new full-time President, Notti.

Before ANCSA, the Native population had gone through numerous hardships over the last century from European expansion. In the mid-1700s Alaska's population (according to James Mooney) was home to an estimated 74,000 Eskimos, Indians, and Aleuts.

After the purchase of Alaska by the United States in 1867, Alaska remained classified as a territory. "Thus, without further ceremony," wrote historian Bancroft, "this vast area of land, belonging by right to neither, was transferred from one European race to the offshoot of another." Negotiations regarding the purchase of the land were conducted with such speed that the treaty itself was hastily drawn and failed to define clearly the status of Natives, their rights, or matters of land ownership. Only one paragraph (part of Article III) was devoted to the inhabitants of Russia-America. It was not until 1959 that Alaska would officially be incorporated as a state.

At hearings held in Fairbanks and Anchorage the October 17 and 18, 1969 prior to the passage of ANCSA, Notti commented pushing that the money in the bill was not enough "The $500 million provision of our bill may seem like a lot of money, but after looking at the conditions in our villages, $500 million will only give our Native people a chance to operate on a standard of living of what we consider basic minimums, I think, for the rest of the United States." In its final bill, ANCSA granted the Native people of Alaska over $900 million.

The ANCSA included of 44 million acres (180,000 km^{2}) and $962.5 million patented and titles transferred to twelve Alaska Native regional corporations and over 200 local village corporations. The surface rights to the patented land were granted to the village corporations and the subsurface right to the land was granted to the regional corporation, creating a split estate pursuant to section 14(f). Notti also cast the tie-breaking vote to enter Sealaska and Tlingit and Haida into the Alaska Federation of Natives. His tie-breaking vote brought $7.2 million and 290,000 acres (1,200 km^{2}) of land to Native Corporations in Southeast Alaska. The twelve regional Native corporations and several village corporations today employ around 58,000 people creating thousands of jobs for Native and non-Native Alaskans.

=== Later life ===
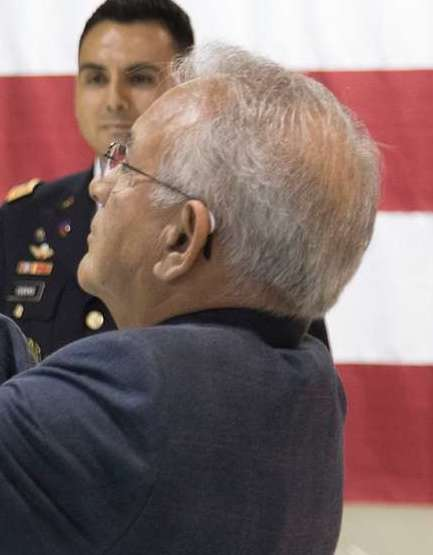
Notti in 2017

After the passage of ANCSA, Notti continued his career with AFN, eventually becoming the CEO of Doyon, Limited, Commissioner of Commerce & Economic Development, and Commissioner of Community & Regional Affairs of Alaska.

In 2021, Notti was inducted into the National Native American Hall of Fame.

In March 2022, Notti announced he would contest the special election called in Alaska's at-large congressional district, triggered by Don Young's death. Notti lost the nonpartisan blanket primary election, held on June 11, 2022; he endorsed eventual victor Mary Peltola in the runoff election.
