= Alaska Native Claims Settlement Act =

Statute of the United States

- Long title: An Act to provide for the settlement of certain land claims of Alaska Natives, and for other purposes.
- Acronyms (colloquial): ANCSA
- Enacted by: the 92nd United States Congress

Citations
- Public law: Pub. L. 92–203
- Statutes at Large: 85 Stat. 688

Codification
- Titles amended: Title 43 – Public Lands
- U.S.C. sections created: 43 U.S.C. § 1601

Legislative history
- Introduced in the House as H.R. 10367 by Interior and Insular Affairs on August 4, 1971; Passed the House on October 20, 1971; Passed the Senate on November 1, 1971; Signed into law by President Richard Nixon on December 18, 1971

The Alaska Native Claims Settlement Act (ANCSA) was signed into law by President Richard Nixon on December 18, 1971, constituting what is still the largest land claims settlement in United States history. ANCSA was intended to resolve long-standing issues surrounding aboriginal land claims in Alaska, as well as to stimulate economic development throughout Alaska.

The settlement established Alaska Native claims to the land by transferring titles to twelve Alaska Native regional corporations and over 200 local village corporations. A thirteenth regional corporation was later created for Alaska Natives who no longer resided in Alaska. The act is codified in chapter 33 of title 43 of the US Code.

== Background ==
=== Alaskan statehood ===
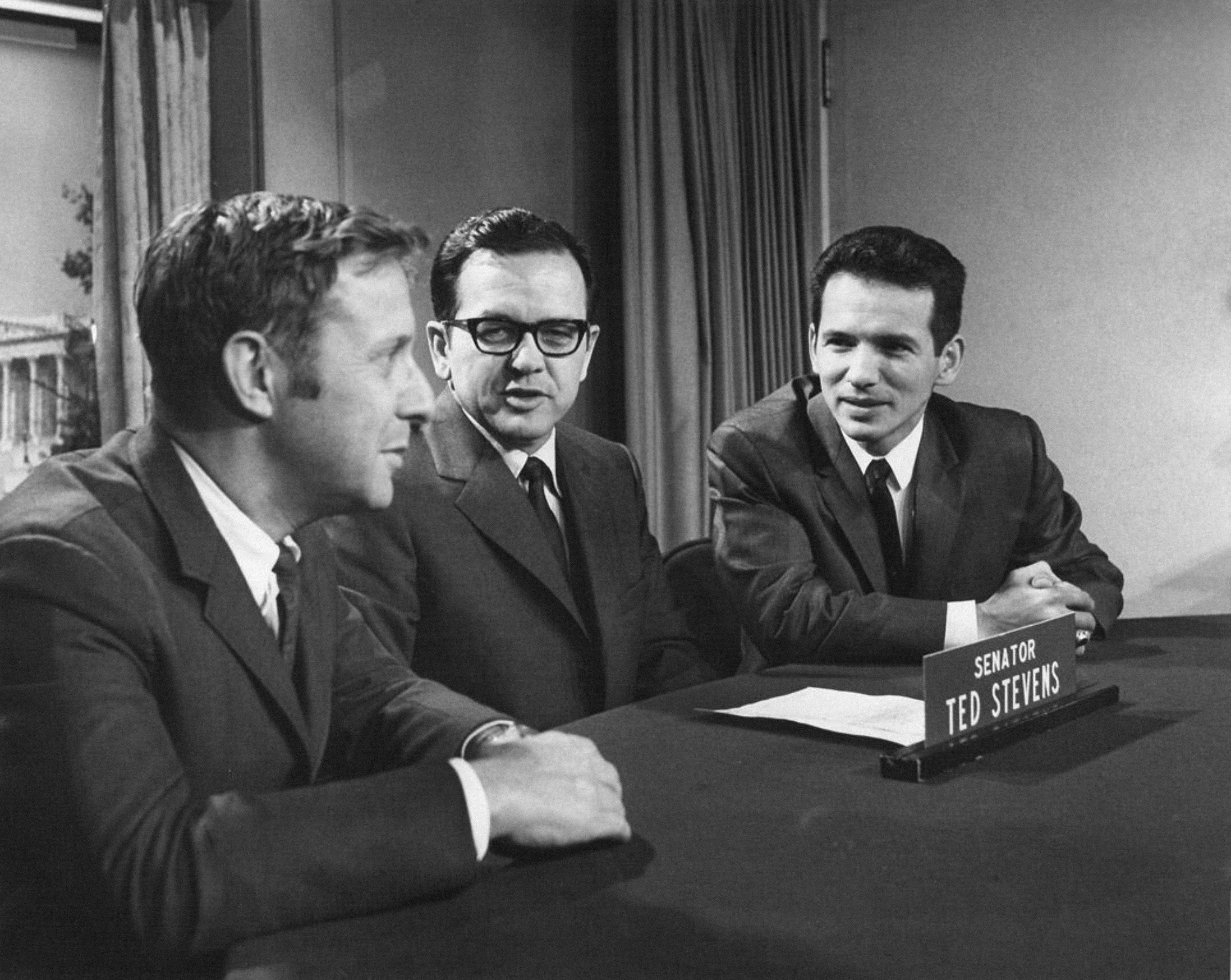
Jay Greenfield, U.S. Senator Ted Stevens and AFN President Emil Notti discussing ANCSA in the Senate TV Studio in 1969.

When Alaska became a state in 1959, section 4 of the Alaska Statehood Act provided that any existing Alaska Native land claims would be unaffected by statehood and held in status quo. Yet while section 4 of the act preserved Native land claims until later settlement, section 6 allowed for the state government to claim lands deemed vacant. Section 6 granted the state of Alaska the right to select lands then in the hands of the federal government, with the exception of Native territory. As a result, nearly 104.5 million acres (423,000 km^{2}) from the public domain would eventually be transferred to the state. The state government also attempted to acquire lands under section 6 of the Statehood Act that were subject to Native claims under section 4, and that were currently occupied and used by Alaska Natives. The federal Bureau of Land Management began to process the Alaska government's selections without taking into account the Native claims and without informing the affected Native groups.

It was against this backdrop that the original language for a land claims settlement was developed.

A 9.2-magnitude earthquake struck the state in 1964. Recovery efforts drew the attention of the federal government. The Federal Field Committee for Development Planning in Alaska decided that Natives should receive $100 million and 10% of revenue as a royalty. Nothing was done with this proposal, however, and a freeze on land transfers remained in effect.

=== Founding of the Alaska Federation of Natives (AFN) ===
In 1966, Emil Notti called for a statewide meeting inviting numerous leaders around Alaska to gather and create the first meeting of a committee. The historic meeting was held October 18, 1966 - on the 99th anniversary of the transfer of Alaska from Russia. Notti presided over the three-day conference as it discussed matters of land recommendations, claims committees, and political challenges the act would have in getting through congress. Many respected politicians and businessmen attended the meeting and delegates were astonished at the attention which they received from well-known political figures of the state. The growing presence and political importance of Natives was evidenced when members were able to gain election to seven of the sixty seats in the legislature.

When the group met a second time early in 1967, it emerged with a new name, The Alaska Federation of Natives (AFN), and a new full-time President, Emil Notti. AFN went on to profoundly change the human rights and economic stability of the Alaska Native population.

=== Native Land Claims Task Force ===
In 1967, Governor Walter Hickel summoned a group of Indigenous leaders and politicians to work out a settlement that would be satisfactory to Natives. (Note: Among the appointees were politicians Raymond C. Christiansen, Willie Hensley, Carl E. Moses, John C. Sackett, and Jules Wright. Indigenous members included George Attla, Cecil Barnes, Laura Bergt, John Borbridge, Alice Brown, Harry Carter, Jerry Crow, Jeff David, Frank Degnan, Andrew Demonski, Mark Ewan, Richard Frank, Charles Franz, Tom Gregoroff, Eben Hopson, Axel Johnson, Flore Lekanoff, Tony Lewis, Byron Mallott, Emil McCord, Elva Naanes, Hugh Nicholls, Emil Notti, George Olson, Howard Rock, Harvey Samuelson, Walter Soboleff, Seraphim Stephan, Richard Stitt, George Trigg, Donald R. Wright and Lula Young.) The group met for ten days and asked for $20 million in exchange for requested lands. Among the other task force proposals were an outright grant of 1,000 acres per native village resident; a revenue-sharing program for state land claims and national mineral development projects; secured hunting and fishing rights on public lands; and a Native Commission to administrate state and federal compliance with the provisions of the claims settlement. They proposed receiving 10% of federal mineral lease revenue for ten years, once the freeze which had been placed on land patents to allow oil exploration was lifted.

=== Oil ===
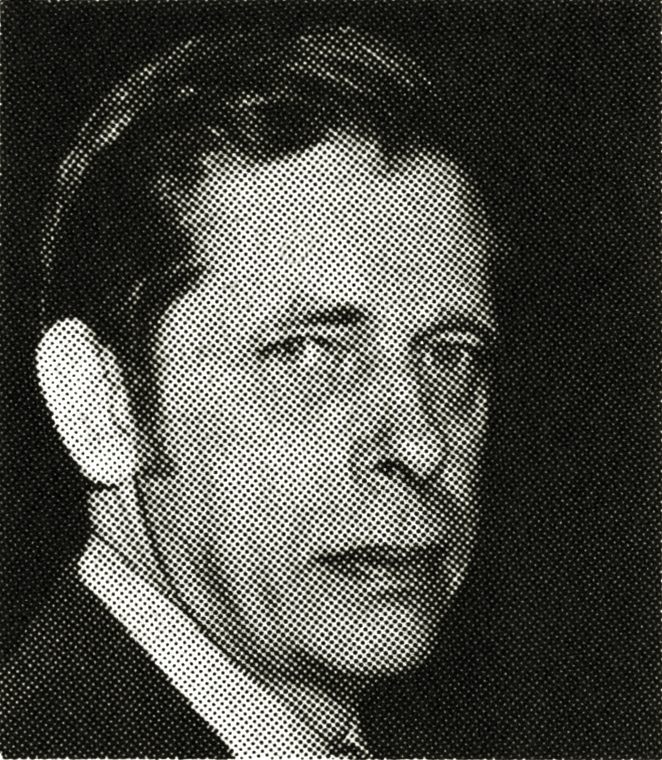
Cliff Groh was one of a number of non-Native lawyers who assisted various Native organizations and AFN's president Emil Notti in achieving passage of ANCSA.

In 1968, the Atlantic-Richfield Company discovered oil at Prudhoe Bay on the Arctic coast, catapulting the issue of land ownership into headlines. In order to lessen the difficulty of drilling at such a remote location and transporting the oil to the lower 48 states, the oil companies proposed building a pipeline to carry the oil across Alaska to the port of Valdez. At Valdez, the oil would be loaded onto tankers and shipped to the contiguous states.

The plan had been approved, but a permit to construct the pipeline, which would cross lands involved in the land claims dispute, could not be granted until the Native claims were settled. Hearings were held for the first time before the United States House's Subcommittee on Indian Affairs in July 1968. Among those who attended the hearings were officials and legislators, as well as Laura Bergt, Roger Connor, Thoda Forslund, Cliff Groh, Barry Jackson, Flore Lekanof, Notti, and Morris Thompson.

=== Government negotiations and policy ===
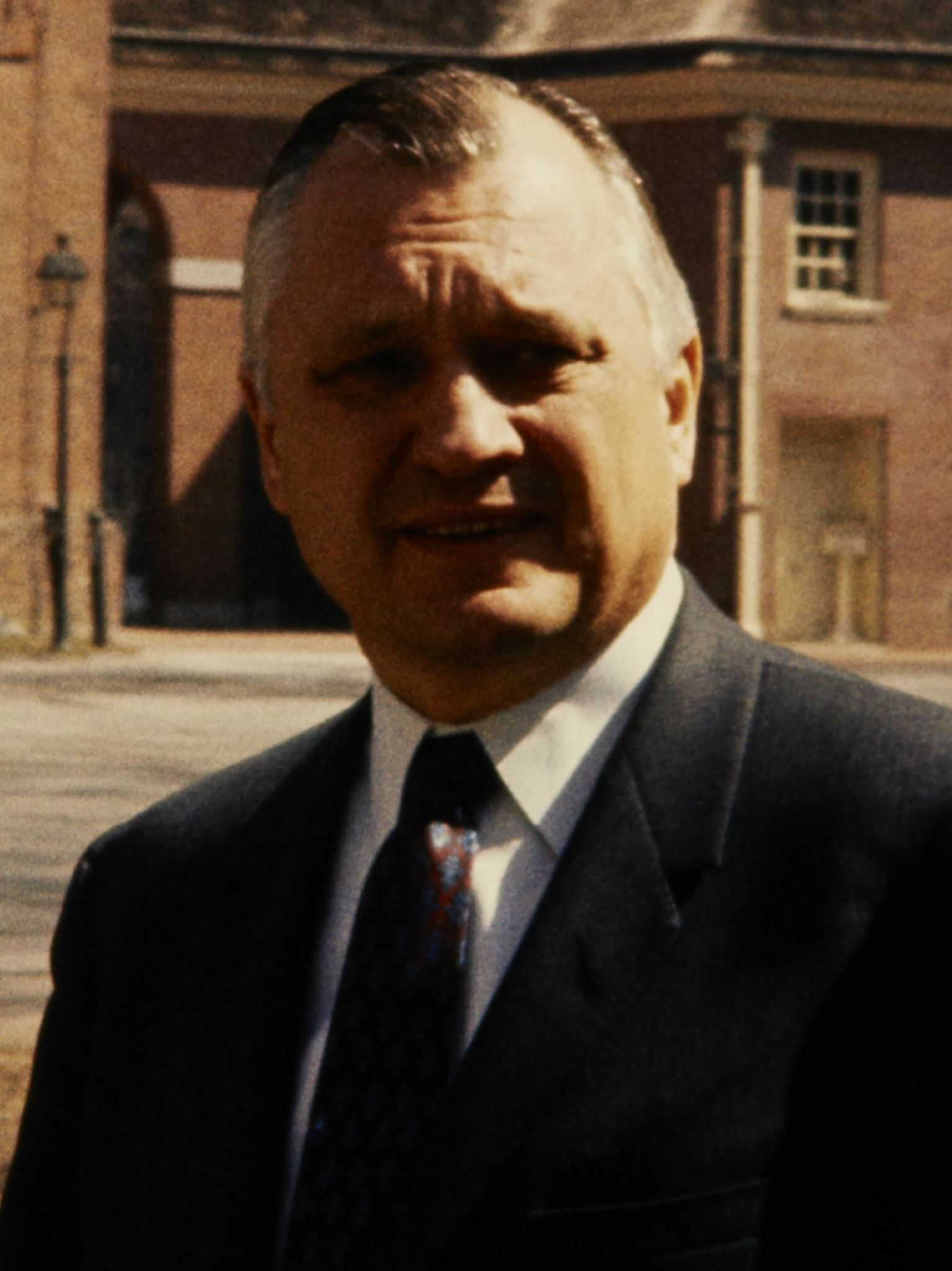
Alaska Governor Wally Hickel was appointed as President Nixon's Interior Secretary.

In 1969, President Nixon appointed Hickel as Secretary of the Interior. The Alaska Federation of Natives (AFN) protested against Hickel's nomination, but he was eventually confirmed. He worked with the AFN, negotiating with Native leaders and state government over the disputed lands. Offers went back and forth, with each rejecting the other's proposals. The AFN wanted rights to land, while then-Governor Keith Miller believed Natives did not have legitimate claims to state land in light of the provisions of the Alaska Statehood Act. On July 8, 1970, Nixon delivered a speech reversing the Indian termination policy in favor of allowing tribal self-determination. The following month, he established the National Council on Indian Opportunity, headed by Vice President Spiro Agnew, which included eight Native leaders: Frank Belvin (Choctaw), Bergt (Iñupiat), Betty Mae Jumper (Seminole), Earl Old Person (Blackfeet), John C. Rainer (Taos Pueblo), Martin Seneca Jr. (Seneca), Harold Shunk (Yankton-Sioux), and Joseph C. "Lone Eagle" Vasquez (Apache-Sioux).

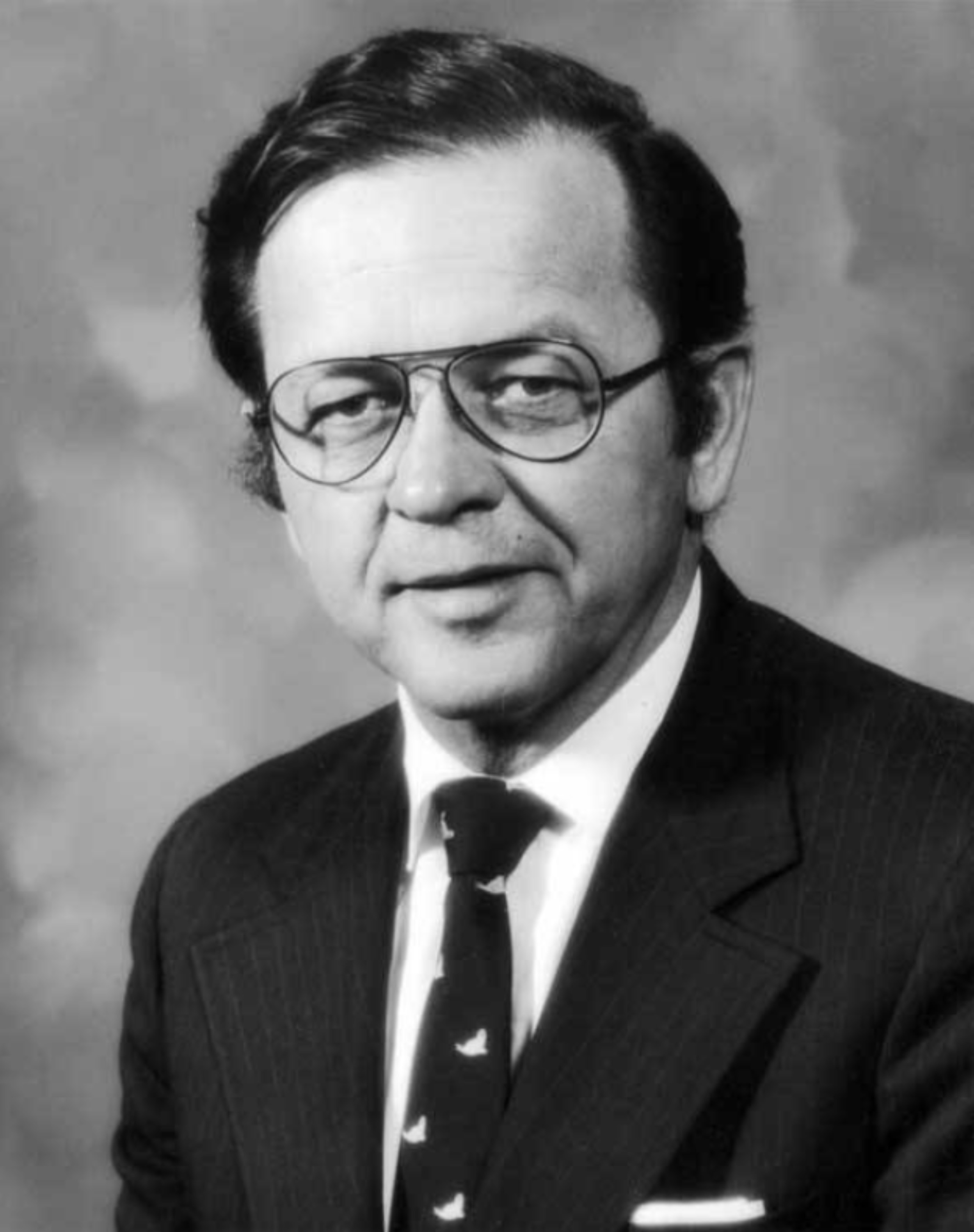
Ted Stevens was key in the bill's passage.

During the state administration of Governor William A. Egan positions were staked out upon which the AFN and other stakeholders could largely agree. Native leaders, in addition to Alaska's congressional delegation and the state's newly elected Governor Egan, eventually reached the basis for presenting an agreement to Congress. Bergt attended a March 1971 conference of the National Congress of American Indians in Kansas City, Missouri and was able to persuade Agnew there to meet with national officials, herself, Christiansen, an Alaska State Senator; Al Ketzler, chair of the Tanana Chiefs Conference; and Don Wright, president of the Alaska Federation of Natives a week later. That meeting held on March 12, marked a turning-point in negotiations with the various parties. The proposed settlement terms faced challenges in both houses but found a strong ally in Senator Henry M. Jackson from Washington state. The most controversial issues that continued to hold up approval were methods for determining land selection by Alaska Natives and financial distribution.

With major petroleum dollars on the line, pressure mounted to achieve a definitive legislative resolution at the federal level. In 1971, the Alaska Native Claims Settlement Act was signed into law by President Nixon. It abrogated Native claims to aboriginal lands except those that are the subject of the law. In return, Natives retained up to 44 million acres (180,000 km^{2}) of land and were paid $963 million. The land and money were to be divided among regional, urban, and village tribal corporations established under the law, often recognizing existing leadership.

Alaskan officials were originally divided on the bill, though by 1970, with Interior Secretary Wally Hickel, Governor William A. Egan, Representative Nick Begich Sr. and Senators Ted Stevens and Mike Gravel all backing the bill, the opposition died down. Stevens was particularly strongminded, and was key in the bill's passage. Stevens, a freshman Senator for most of the fight, would later remark:

ANCSA was my baptism of fire as a Senator from Alaska .... It didn't occur to me that some Senators had the opportunity to ease into their jobs. Life in the Senate for me was fast-paced from the beginning .... With my experience working in the Department of the Interior and with the Statehood Act, and my faith in the determination and unity of purpose of Alaska's Native people, I believed from the beginning that a settlement could be achieved .... My memories of the Congressional action as ANCSA took shape aren't of a battle as much as they are of long hours of tough, hard negotiating, often two steps forward and one step back ....

== Effect of land conveyances ==
In 1971, barely one million acres of land in Alaska were in private hands. ANCSA, together with section 6 of Alaska Statehood Act, which the new act allowed to come to fruition, affected ownership to about 148.5 million acres (601,000 km^{2}) of land in Alaska once wholly controlled by the federal government. That is larger by 6 million acres (24,000 km^{2}) than the combined areas of Maine, Vermont, New Hampshire, Massachusetts, Rhode Island, Connecticut, New York, New Jersey, Pennsylvania, Delaware, Maryland and Virginia.

When the bill passed in 1971, it included provisions that had never before been attempted in previous United States settlements with Native Americans. The newly passed Alaska Native Claims Settlement Act created twelve Native regional economic development corporations. Each corporation was associated with a specific region of Alaska and the Natives who had traditionally lived there. This innovative approach to native settlements engaged the tribes in corporate capitalism.

The idea originated with the AFN, who believed that the Natives would have to become a part of the capitalist system in order to survive. As stockholders in these corporations, the Natives could earn some income and stay in their traditional villages. If the corporations were managed properly, they could make profits that would enable individuals to stay, rather than having to leave Native villages to find better work. This was intended to help preserve Native culture.

== Native and state land selection ==
Alaska Natives had three years from passage of ANCSA to make land selections of the 44 million acres (180,000 km^{2}) granted under the act. In some cases Native corporations received outside aid in surveying the land. For instance, Doyon, Limited (one of the 13 regional corporations) was helped by the Geophysical Institute of the University of Alaska. The Institute determined which land contained resources such as minerals and coal. NASA similarly provided satellite imagery to aid in Native corporations finding areas most suited for vegetation and their traditional subsistence culture. The imagery showed locations of caribou and moose, as well as forests with marketable timber. In total about 7 million acres (28,000 km^{2}) were analyzed for Doyon. Natives were able to choose tens of thousands of acres of land rich with timber while Doyon used mineral analysis to attract businesses.

The state of Alaska to date has been granted approximately 85% or 90 million acres (360,000 km^{2}) of the land claims it has made under ANCSA. The state is entitled to a total of 104.5 million acres (423,000 km^{2}) under the terms of the Statehood Act. Originally the state had 25 years after passage of the Alaska Statehood Act to file claims under section 6 of the act with the Bureau of Land Management (BLM). Amendments to ANCSA extended that deadline until 1994, with the expectation that BLM would complete processing of land transfers subject to overlapping Native claims by 2009. Nonetheless, some Native and state selections under ANCSA remained unresolved as late as December 2014.

== Criticism of ANCSA ==
There was largely positive reaction to ANCSA, although not entirely. The act was supported by Natives as well as non-Natives, and likewise enjoyed bipartisan support. Natives were heavily involved in the legislative process, and the final draft of the act used many AFN ideas.

Some Natives have argued that ANCSA has hastened cultural genocide of Alaska Natives. Some Natives critiqued ANCSA as an illegitimate treaty since only tribal leaders were involved and the provisions of the act were not voted on by indigenous populations. One native described it as a social and political experiment. Critics have also argued that Natives so feared massacre or incarceration that they offered no resistance to the act.

Others have argued that the settlement was arguably the most generous afforded by the United States to a Native group. They note that some of the largest and most profitable corporations in the state are the twelve created by ANCSA. Other critics attacked the act as "Native welfare" and such complaints continue to be expressed.

The corporation system has been critiqued, as in some cases stockholders have sold land to outside corporations that have leveled forests and extracted minerals. But supporters of the system argue that it has provided economic benefits for indigenous peoples that outweigh these problems.

== Selected provisions of ANCSA ==
- Native claims in Alaska were extinguished by means of section 4 of ANCSA.
- In exchange for abrogating Native claims, approximately one-ninth of the state's land plus $962.5 million were distributed to more than 200 local Alaska Native "village corporations" established under section 8, in addition to 12 land-owning for-profit Alaska Native "regional corporations" and a non-land-owning thirteenth corporation for Alaska Natives who had left the state established under section 6.
- Of the compensation, $462.5 million was to come from the federal treasury and the rest from oil revenue-sharing.
- Settlement benefits would accrue to those with at least one-fourth Native ancestry under sections 3(b) and 5(a).
- Of the approximately 80,000 Natives enrolled under ANCSA, those living in villages (approximately two-thirds of the total) would receive 100 shares in both a village and a regional corporation.
- The remaining one-third would be "at large" shareholders with 100 shares in a regional corporation with additional rights to revenue from regional mineral and timber resources.
- The Alaska Native Allotment Act was revoked but with the proviso that pending claims under that act would continue to be processed under section 18. Successful applicants would be excluded under ANCSA by section 14(h)(5) from land to be used for a primary residence.
- The twelve regional corporations within the state would administer the settlement.
- A thirteenth corporation composed of Natives who had left the state would receive compensation but not land.
- Surface rights to 44 million acres (180,000 km^{2}) were patented to the Native village and regional corporations under sections 12(c), as well as 14(h)(1) and (8).
- The surface rights to the patented land were granted to the village corporations and the subsurface right to the land were granted to the regional corporation, creating a split estate pursuant to section 14(f).

=== Alaska Native regional corporations ===
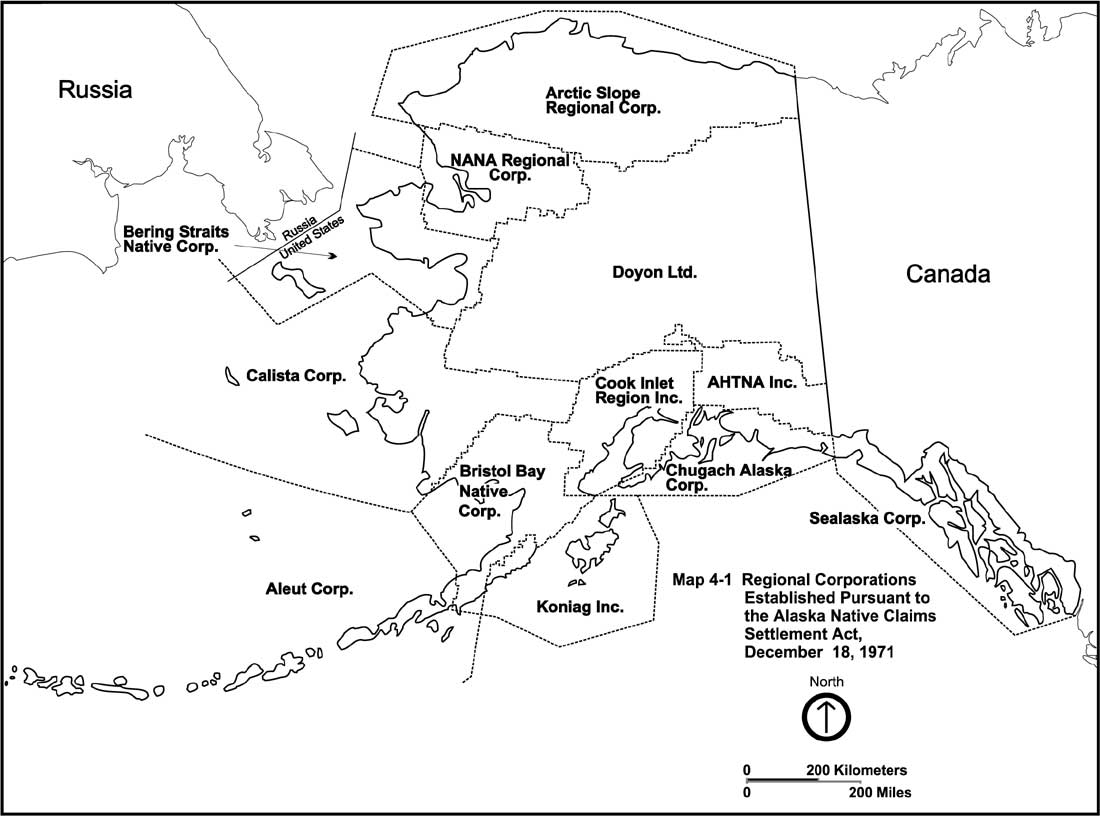
Regional corporations established by the Alaska Native Claims Settlement Act.

The following thirteen regional corporations were created under ANCSA:

- Ahtna, Incorporated
- The Aleut Corporation
- Arctic Slope Regional Corporation
- Bering Straits Native Corporation
- Bristol Bay Native Corporation
- Calista Corporation
- Chugach Alaska Corporation
- Cook Inlet Region, Inc.
- Doyon, Limited
- Koniag, Incorporated
- NANA Regional Corporation
- Sealaska Corporation
- The 13th Regional Corporation

Additionally, most regions and some villages have created their own nonprofits providing social services and health care through grant funding and federal compacts. The objectives of these nonprofits are varied, but focus generally on cultural and educational activities. These include scholarships for Native students, sponsorship of cultural and artistic events, preservation efforts for Native languages, and protection of sites with historic or religious importance.

=== Alaska Native village and urban corporations ===
ANCSA created about 224 village and urban corporations. Below is a representative list of village and urban corporations created under ANCSA:

- Ukpeaġvik Iñupiat Corporation, village corporation for Utqiaġvik
- Bethel Native Corporation, village corporation for Bethel
- Cape Fox Corporation, village corporation for Saxman
- Deloycheet, Inc., village corporation for Holy Cross
- Huna Totem Corporation, village corporation for Hoonah
- Haida Corporation, village corporation for Hydaburg
- Goldbelt, Inc., urban corporation for Juneau
- Paug-Vik, Inc. Ltd., village corporation for Naknek
- Chenega Corporation, village corporation for Chenega
- Afognak Native Corporation, village corporation for Afognak and Port Lions
- Kavilco Incorporated, village corporation for Kasaan
- Klukwan, Inc., village corporation for Klukwan
- The Kuskokwim Corporation, village corporation for Aniak, Crooked Creek, Georgetown, Kalskag, Lower Kalskag, Napaimute, Red Devil, Russian Mission, Sleetmute and Stony River
- Natives of Kodiak, Inc., urban corporation for Kodiak
- Ounalashka Corporation, village corporation for Unalaska
- Ouzinkie Native Corporation, village corporation for Ouzinkie
- Shee Atika, Incorporated, urban corporation for Sitka

== See also ==
- Alaska National Interest Lands Conservation Act
- Alaska Statehood Act
- Alaska Native Allotment Act
- Alaska Land Transfer Acceleration Act
- Emil Notti

== Bibliography ==
- Borneman, Walter R. Alaska: Saga of a Bold Land. Harper Perennial. (2004)
- Dombrowski, Kirk. Against Culture: Development, Politics, and Religion in Indian Alaska U of Nebraska Press. (2001)
- Haycox, Stephen. Alaska: An American Colony. University of Washington Press. (2006)
- Haycox, Stephen. Frigid Embrace: Politics, Economics, and Environment in Alaska Oregon University Press. (2002)
- Haynes, James B. "Land Selection and Development under the Alaska Native Claims Settlement Act," Arctic Institute of North America, Vol. 28–3, pp. 201–208 (September 1975)
- Linxwiler, James D. "The Alaska Native Claims Settlement Act: The First Twenty Years," Proceedings from the 38th Annual Rocky Mountain Mineral Law Institute. (1992)
- Roderick, Libby. Alaska Native Cultures and Issues: Responses to Frequently Asked Questions. University of Alaska Press. (2010)
- Williams, Maria Sháa Tláa. The Alaska Native Reader: History, Culture, Politics. Duke University Press. (2009).
- Worl, Rosita. "Reconstructing Sovereignty in Alaska," Cultural Survival Quarterly. (Fall 2001)
