= The 13th Regional Corporation =

Alaska Native corporation

The 13th Regional Corporation is one of thirteen Alaska Native Regional Corporations created under the Alaska Native Claims Settlement Act of 1971 (ANCSA) in settlement of Indigenous land claims. It was incorporated in Alaska on December 31, 1975. The 13th Regional Corporation is a for-profit corporation presently headquartered in Seattle, Washington, with approximately 5,500 Alaska Native shareholders of Eskimo, American Indian, and Aleut descent. Its original enrollment was of Alaska Natives who were no longer resident in Alaska.

Unlike the other 12 Alaska Native regional corporations, The 13th Regional Corporation and its shareholders received only monetary compensation, with no land conveyance, in settlement of aboriginal land claims.

The 13th Regional Corporation was involuntarily dissolved by the Division of Corporations, Business and Professional Licensing of the Alaska Department of Commerce, Community and Economic Development on December 31, 2013. This followed the resignation of the corporation's registered agent on May 22, 2013. A website claiming no affiliation with The 13th Regional Corporation or its shareholders is attempting to locate shareholders with the intent of "attempt[ing] to revive The 13th Regional Corporation and restore it to working order."

== Creation of the 13th Regional Corporation ==
Initially only 12 regional corporations were created after ANCSA's passage in 1971. Its creation was dependent upon how many of approximately 78,000 Alaska Native people eligible for enrollment under ANCSA voted "yes" on Section 22 of the official enrollment form, which read, "Do you elect to establish and be enrolled in a 13th Region?" The initial determination of the Bureau of Indian Affairs was that an insufficient number of enrollees voted for creation of a 13th regional corporation, and each of the "yes" voters was instead designated as a shareholder in one of the original 12 regional corporations.

However, a 1975 U.S. District Court ruling by Judge Oliver Gasch overturned the Bureau of Indian Affairs. The 13th Regional Corporation was created under Alaska law as a private for-profit corporation on December 31, 1975.

== Officers and directors ==
A current listing of The 13th Regional Corporation's officers and directors, as well as documents filed with the State of Alaska since The 13th's incorporation, are available online through the Corporations Database of the Division of Corporations, Business & Professional Licensing, Alaska Department of Commerce, Community and Economic Development.

== Shareholders ==
At incorporation, The 13th Regional Incorporation enrolled 4,537 Alaska Natives, each of whom received 100 shares of corporate stock. The corporation currently has approximately 5,500 shareholders. As an ANCSA corporation, The 13th Regional Corporation has no publicly traded stock and its shares cannot legally be sold, bartered, or traded. With very limited exception, they can only be passed to the descendants of Alaska Natives.

== Problems with corporate management ==
Initially, the corporation was provided $52 million in settlement money, half of which was disbursed to shareholders. The corporation for investment on behalf of its shareholders retained the remainder. However, the corporation's early losses led to charges of mismanagement of corporate assets. According to a 1998 special report by the newspaper Juneau Empire, the 13th Regional Corporation "still can't say exactly what happened to the remaining $27 million of land claims the corporation kept—records are incomplete. Present management [as of 1998] and past management both say mismanagement by administrators or the board of directors was to blame for the 13th's early losses." The Juneau Empire followed with, "Lawyers looked into the corporation's books. They determined that there may have been enough evidence of dubious activity to pursue lawsuits but proceeding with litigation would have cost more than would be recouped, [1998 Chairman Kurt] Engelstad said."

=== M Kennedy Construction ===
Kurt Engelstad and former President Norm Ream both figured prominently in the "rebuilding" years of the 1990s to 2004. Ream was instrumental in the 13th's purchase of 51 percent ownership in M Kennedy Construction, Inc. (MKC). MKC had been founded in 1979 as a sole proprietorship company and was incorporated in 1992. With The 13th's purchase of 51 percent ownership, MLK became a majority-owned subsidiary of the 13th, making it a "minority and economically disadvantaged business enterprise[s]" under the Small Business Administration's (SBA) 8(a) program, and giving it a significant advantage in competing for government contracts.

MLK's minority owner, with 49 percent interest, was Michael Kennedy. In 2004, The 13th Regional Corporation bought out Kennedy's shares of MKC for $2.2 million, thus making MKC a wholly owned subsidiary of the 13th. Kennedy went on to form a new corporation in June 2004, Kennedy Services LLC, also focused on construction contracts. However, it was not disclosed to shareholders that Norm Ream, who resigned from The 13th around the same time, was named as part owner and treasurer of the new venture, an apparent conflict of interest given his involvement shortly before as president and director in The 13th's buyout of MLK. Former MLK employee Jimmy Mortensen was named as a third partner. Complicating the matter was that MLK had only two years remaining to its eligibility in the 8(a) program, which would presumably lower its value, throwing into question its valuation at $4.4 million at the time Kennedy was paid $2.2 million to buy out his shares. Shareholders questioned if $4.4 million was an accurate market value, or if improprieties had occurred.

=== Mail Boxes Etc. ===
Kurt Engelstad, on the other hand, was instrumental in bringing The 13th Regional Corporation into the world of Mail Boxes Etc., which would later become UPS Stores. He, along with Bent Petersen (from Montana), was managing the building of the northwest franchise base for Mail Boxes, Etc. While at the same time drawing salaries (which were not reported in annual reports to shareholders), the two received increasing ownership interests in the franchiser operations, then known as NW Business Services Group LLC. The Board of Directors during this period, however, authorized loans for hundreds of thousands of dollars to Engelstad and Peterson, to finance their increasing share of ownership of the operations. These loans were not fully disclosed in annual reports to shareholders. In 2004 the two bought out the 13th's last 66% interest in the operations.

The last Audited Financial Statement available to the public (for 2005) reported a net loss of $1,850,166 on net losses of $869,936 on construction contracts, net losses of $185,428 on contract electrical services, and net losses of $794,802 on corporate operations. Revenues for construction and electrical contracting went from $31,835,643 in 2004 to $8,968,568 in 2005. Private quarterly reports detailing continued operations since December 2005 are available to shareholders upon request by calling 206-575-6229 and identifying yourself as a shareholder and requesting the latest quarterly statements.

2004 Audited Financial Statements revealed that in 2004 several checks, most signed by the then CEO (Ken Krajewski) and the office administrative assistant (Suzy Villegas) —and totaling over $2.2 million—left the company over several months in a deal that The 13th's Board of Directors claim that the then-acting CEO Krajewski "had no authority to enter into". Liz Ross, Chairman of the Board, relieved Krajewski of his duties with pay pending an investigation. The board hired Jim Fowler as an attorney and appointed Ross as CEO. Also in 2004, the former CEO (Krajewski) "claimed breach of contract and discrimination upon his termination. The 13th settled with the CEO in January 2005 and the settlement amount has been accrued at December 31, 2004."

Other highlights in the 2004 Audited Financial Statements include: $130,000 moved from trust for missing shareholders into "operating cash accounts in 2004"; Deficit in operations with Dick Pacific, Ltd., joint venture of almost $375,000, and a reduction of venturers' equity of about 20% in a joint venture with Chugach Support Services (related to another ANCSA corporation).

== Business enterprises ==
Under federal law, The 13th Regional Corporation and its majority-owned subsidiaries, joint ventures and partnerships are deemed to be "minority and economically disadvantaged business enterprise[s]" (43 USC 1626(e)).

The 13th's subsidiaries include:

- Alindeska Electrical Contractors (AEC). Headquartered in Tukwila, Washington. Wholly owned subsidiary. Union contractor specializing in private and government electrical construction services.
- M Kennedy Co., Inc. (MKC). Headquartered in Bremerton, Washington. Wholly owned subsidiary. Management construction company, (80% of work is subcontracted; 20% of the job is performed by company employees), with federal government contracts. MKC was founded in 1979 as a sole proprietorship company and was incorporated in 1992. In 1997, The 13th Regional Corporation purchased 51% ownership to meet qualification in applying for government contracts through the minority/disadvantaged element of the Small Business Administration (SBA) 8(a) program. The 13th Regional Corporation bought out the remaining 49% ownership in 2004.
- North Star Industrial Contractors (NSIC). Headquartered in Bremerton, Washington. Wholly owned subsidiary. Management Construction Company.
- North Star Research and Technology (NSRT). Headquartered in Bremerton, Washington. Certified scientific and technical services consulting firm serving federal government clients.
- NW Business Services Group. This subsidiary formerly held franchiser operations in the Pacific Northwest for Mail Boxes Etc. (now The UPS Store), but was bought out in 2004. NW Business Services Group is now a majority partner (60% ownership) with another Native company, Four Winds Services, Inc. (FWSI) of Altus, Oklahoma, engaged in postal management services.
- Cold Bay Development Corp. Oversees 12.5 acres (51,000 m^{2}) owned by The 13th at Cold Bay, Alaska on the Alaska Peninsula. In partnership with an Anchorage company, Denali Biotechnologies, an attempt is being made to grow blueberries on the property for their anti-oxidant properties.

=== Non-profit ===
- The 13th Regional Heritage Foundation. A tax-exempt, nonprofit providing scholarships to shareholders and their descendants.
