= 34th Alaska State Legislature =

Term of state legislature in Alaska, US

←	33rd Alaska State Legislature	35th Alaska State Legislature	→

Overview
- Legislative body: Alaska Legislature
- Jurisdiction: Alaska, United States
- Meeting place: Alaska State Capitol
- Term: January 21, 2025 – May 15, 2026

Alaska Senate
- Members: 20 Senators
- Senate President: Gary Stevens (R)
- Majority Leader: Cathy Giessel (R)
- Minority Leader: Mike Shower (R)
- Party control: Multipartisan coalition

Alaska House of Representatives
- Members: 40 Representatives
- Speaker of the House: Bryce Edgmon (I)
- Majority Leader: Chuck Kopp (R)
- Minority Leader: Mia Costello (R)
- Party control: Multipartisan coalition

The 34th Alaska State Legislature is the legislative branch of Alaska's state government from January 21, 2025 to May 15, 2026. Its 60-person membership was set by the 2024 Alaska elections.

== Senate ==
Alaska State Senate 34th Alaska Legislature (2025–2026)
District	Name	Party
A	Bert Stedman	Rep
B	Jesse Kiehl	Dem
C	Gary Stevens	Rep
D	Jesse Bjorkman	Rep
E	Cathy Giessel	Rep
F	James D. Kaufman	Rep
G	Elvi Gray-Jackson	Dem
H	Matt Claman	Dem
I	Löki Tobin	Dem
J	Forrest Dunbar	Dem
K	Bill Wielechowski	Dem
L	Kelly Merrick	Rep
M	Shelley Hughes	Rep
N	Robert Yundt	Rep
O	Mike Shower	Rep
P	Scott Kawasaki	Dem
Q	Robert Myers Jr.	Rep
R	Mike Cronk	Rep
S	Lyman Hoffman	Dem
T	Donny Olson	Dem

== House ==
Alaska House of Representatives 34th Alaska Legislature (2025–2026)
District	Name	Party
1	Jeremy Bynum	Rep
2	Rebecca Himschoot	Ind
3	Andi Story	Dem
4	Sara Hannan	Dem
5	Louise Stutes	Rep
6	Sarah Vance	Rep
7	Justin Ruffridge	Rep
8	Bill Elam	Rep
9	Ky Holland	Ind
10	Chuck Kopp	Rep
11	Julie Coulombe	Rep
12	Calvin Schrage	Ind
13	Andy Josephson	Dem
14	Alyse Galvin	Ind
15	Mia Costello	Rep
16	Carolyn Hall	Dem
17	Zack Fields	Dem
18	David Nelson	Rep
19	Genevieve Mina	Dem
20	Andrew Gray	Dem
21	Donna Mears	Dem
22	Ted Eischeid	Dem
23	Jamie Allard	Rep
24	Dan Saddler	Rep
25	DeLena Johnson	Rep
26	Cathy Tilton	Rep
27	Jubilee Underwood	Rep
28	Elexie Moore	Rep
29	George Rauscher	Rep
30	Kevin J. McCabe	Rep
31	Maxine Dibert	Dem
32	Will Stapp	Rep
33	Mike Prax	Rep
34	Frank Tomaszewski	Rep
35	Ashley Carrick	Dem
36	Rebecca Schwanke	Rep
37	Bryce Edgmon	Ind
38	Nellie Jimmie	Dem
39	Neal Foster	Dem
40	Robyn Burke	Dem

== See also ==
- List of Alaska State Legislatures
