= 33rd Alaska State Legislature =

Term of state legislature in Alaska, US

←	32nd Alaska State Legislature	34th Alaska State Legislature	→

Overview
- Legislative body: Alaska Legislature
- Jurisdiction: Alaska, United States
- Meeting place: Alaska State Capitol
- Term: January 17, 2023 – May 15, 2024

Alaska Senate
- Members: 20 Senators
- Senate President: Gary Stevens (R)
- Majority Leader: Cathy Giessel (R)
- Minority Leader: Jesse Kiehl (D)
- Party control: Multipartisan coalition

Alaska House of Representatives
- Members: 40 Representatives
- Speaker of the House: Cathy Tilton (R)
- Majority Leader: Dan Saddler (R)
- Minority Leader: Calvin Schrage (I)
- Party control: Multipartisan coalition

The 33rd Alaska State Legislature represented the legislative branch of Alaska's state government from January 17, 2023 to May 15, 2024. Its 60-person membership was set by the 2022 Alaska elections.

== Senate ==
Alaska State Senate 33rd Alaska Legislature (2023-2024)
District	Name	Party
A	Bert Stedman	Rep
B	Jesse Kiehl	Dem
C	Gary Stevens	Rep
D	Jesse Bjorkman	Rep
E	Cathy Giessel	Rep
F	James D. Kaufman	Rep
G	Elvi Gray-Jackson	Dem
H	Matt Claman	Dem
I	Löki Tobin	Dem
J	Forrest Dunbar	Dem
K	Bill Wielechowski	Dem
L	Kelly Merrick	Rep
M	Shelley Hughes	Rep
N	David Wilson	Rep
O	Mike Shower	Rep
P	Scott Kawasaki	Dem
Q	Robert Myers Jr.	Rep
R	Click Bishop	Rep
S	Lyman Hoffman	Dem
T	Donny Olson	Dem

== House ==
Alaska House of Representatives 33rd Alaska Legislature (2023-2024)
District	Name	Party
1	Dan Ortiz	Ind
2	Rebecca Himschoot	Ind
3	Andi Story	Dem
4	Sara Hannan	Dem
5	Louise Stutes	Rep
6	Sarah Vance	Rep
7	Justin Ruffridge	Rep
8	Ben Carpenter	Rep
9	Laddie Shaw	Rep
10	Craig Johnson	Rep
11	Julie Coulombe	Rep
12	Calvin Schrage	Ind
13	Andy Josephson	Dem
14	Alyse Galvin	Ind
15	Thomas McKay	Rep
16	Jennie Armstrong	Dem
17	Zack Fields	Dem
18	Cliff Groh	Dem
19	Genevieve Mina	Dem
20	Andrew Gray	Dem
21	Donna Mears	Dem
22	Stanley Wright	Rep
23	Jamie Allard	Rep
24	Dan Saddler	Rep
25	DeLena Johnson	Rep
26	Cathy Tilton	Rep
27	David Eastman	Rep
28	Jesse Sumner	Rep
29	George Rauscher	Rep
30	Kevin J. McCabe	Rep
31	Maxine Dibert	Dem
32	Will Stapp	Rep
33	Mike Prax	Rep
34	Frank Tomaszewski	Rep
35	Ashley Carrick	Dem
36	Mike Cronk	Rep
37	Bryce Edgmon	Ind
38	Conrad McCormick	Dem
39	Neal Foster	Dem
40	Josiah Patkotak	Ind

== See also ==
- List of Alaska State Legislatures
