= 2024 Alaska House of Representatives election =

2024 Alaska House of Representatives elections
- November 5, 2024

All 40 seats in the Alaska House of Representatives 21 seats needed for a majority
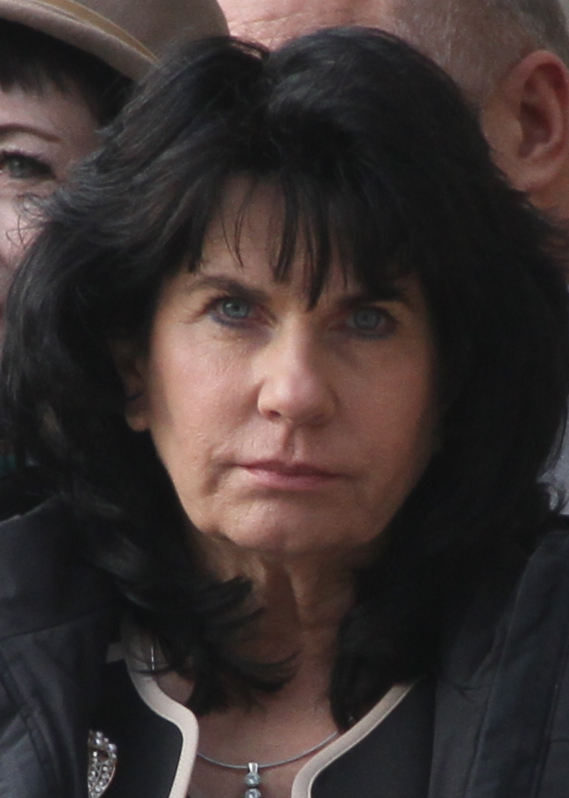

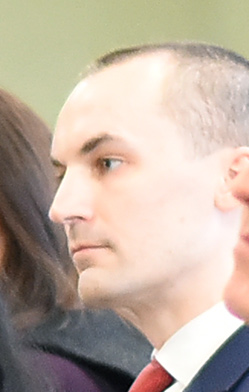

| | Majority party | Minority party | Third party |
|---|---|---|---|
| Leader | Cathy Tilton | Calvin Schrage | — |
| Party | Republican | Democratic | Independent |
| Leader since | February 16, 2021 | January 18, 2023 | — |
| Leader's seat | 26th–Wasilla | 12th–Anchorage | — |
| Last election | 21 seats, 56.21% | 13 seats, (Note: Two Democrats and two independents joined the new Republican-led coalition) 27.83% | 6 seats, 13.31% |
| Seats before | 22 | 13 | 5 |
| Seats won | 21 (Note: Two Republicans joined all Democrats and independents to form a governing coalition) | 14 | 5 |
| Seat change | ▼1 | ▲1 | Steady |
| Popular vote | 159,813 | 74,931 | 43,887 |
| Percentage | 55.51% | 26.03% | 15.24% |
| Swing | ▼0.70% | ▼1.80% | ▲1.93% |
- Results: Republican gain Republican hold Democratic gain Democratic hold Independent gain Independent hold
Speaker before election
Cathy Tilton
Republican (Coalition)
Elected Speaker
Bryce Edgmon
Independent (Coalition)

The 2024 Alaska House of Representatives election took place on November 5, 2024, as part of the biennial United States elections. All 40 seats in the Alaska House of Representatives were up for election.

== Background ==
=== Pre-election composition ===
Republicans formed a majority coalition during the 33rd Alaska State Legislature, consisting of 19 Republicans, 2 Democrats, and 2 Independents. Republican Cathy Tilton was elected speaker and Dan Saddler served as majority leader. Independent Calvin Schrage served as minority leader of the minority coalition, consisting of 11 Democrats, 4 Independents, and 1 Republican. Republican David Eastman, continued to caucus with neither party.

Independent Josiah Patkotak resigned October 10, 2023, to become mayor of North Slope Borough. Republican Thomas Baker was appointed by Governor Mike Dunleavy to replace him.

== Predictions ==
| Source | Ranking | As of |
|---|---|---|
| CNalysis | Tossup | September 5, 2024 |

== Overview ==
=== Primary elections ===
2024 Alaska State House of Representatives election Primary election – August 20, 2024
| Party | Votes | % | Candidates | Advanced to general | Seats contesting |
|---|---|---|---|---|---|
| Republican | 51,614 | 53.22% | 44 | 39 | 29 |
| Democratic | 27,528 | 28.39% | 24 | 24 | 20 |
| Independent | 15,732 | 16.22% | 14 | 13 | 10 |
| Libertarian | 1,204 | 1.24% | 3 | 3 | 3 |
| Independence | 587 | 0.61% | 1 | 1 | 1 |
| Veterans of Alaska | 309 | 0.32% | 1 | 1 | 1 |
| Totals | 96,974 | 100.00% | 87 | 80 | — |

=== General election ===
2024 Alaska House of Representatives elections General election – November 5, 2024
| Party | Round 1 | | Max Round | | Candidates | Before | After | ± |
| Party | Votes | % | Votes | % | Candidates | Before | After | ± |
|---|---|---|---|---|---|---|---|---|
| Republican | 163,206 | 55.74% | 159,813 | 55.51% | 39 | 22 | 21 | ▼1 |
| Democratic | 74,273 | 25.37% | 74,931 | 26.03% | 24 | 13 | 14 | ▲1 |
| Independent (Note: Includes candidates with a party affiliation of "Non-partisan" or "Undeclared") | 44,424 | 15.17% | 43,887 | 15.24% | 13 | 5 | 5 | Steady |
| Libertarian | 4,203 | 1.44% | 3,712 | 1.29% | 3 | 0 | 0 | Steady |
| Alaska Independence | 1,670 | 0.57% | 1,670 | 0.58% | 1 | 0 | 0 | Steady |
| Veterans of Alaska | 971 | 0.33% | 0 | 0.00% | 1 | 0 | 0 | Steady |
| Write-ins | 4,067 | 1.39% | 3,868 | 1.34% | — | 0 | 0 | Steady |
| Totals | 292,814 | 100.00% | 287,881 | 100.00% | | 40 | 40 | |

First choice vote
| Republican | 55.74% |
| Democratic | 25.37% |
| Independent | 15.17% |
| Libertarian | 1.44% |
| Independence | 0.57% |
| Veterans | 0.33% |
| Write-in | 1.39% |

Max round vote
| Republican | 55.51% |
| Democratic | 26.03% |
| Independent | 15.24% |
| Libertarian | 1.29% |
| Independence | 0.58% |
| Write-in | 1.34% |

Seats
| Republican | 52.5% |
| Democratic | 35.0% |
| Independent | 12.5% |

=== Close races ===
Seats where the margin of victory was under 10%:

1. State house district 28, 0.2% (Note: Versus a Republican)
2. State house district 18, 0.5% (Note: Versus a Democrat) (gain)
3. State house district 27, 2.5%
4. State house district 8, 4.5%
5. State house district 6, 4.6% (Note: Versus an independent)
6. State house district 38, 4.6%
7. State house district 22, 5.0% (gain)
8. State house district 11, 5.4%
9. State house district 15, 6.0%
10. State house district 13, 6.8%
11. State house district 9, 8.8% (gain)
12. State house district 31, 8.7%

== Retirements ==
Seven incumbents did not seek re-election.

=== Republicans ===
1. District 8: Ben Carpenter retired to run for State Senate.
2. District 9: Laddie Shaw retired.
3. District 15: Tom McKay retired.
4. District 28: Jesse Sumner withdrew from the ballot after the primary election.
5. District 36: Mike Cronk retired to run for State Senate.

=== Democrats ===
1. District 16: Jennie Armstrong retired.

=== Independents ===
1. District 1: Dan Ortiz retired.

== Defeated incumbents ==
=== Republicans ===
1. District 10: Craig Johnson was defeated by fellow Republican (but aligned with the Democratic-led coalition) Chuck Kopp
2. District 22: Stanley Wright was defeated by Democrat Ted Eischeid
3. District 27: David Eastman was defeated by fellow Republican Jubilee Underwood

=== Democrats ===
1. District 18: Cliff Groh was defeated by Republican David Nelson
2. District 38: Conrad McCormick was defeated by fellow Democrat Nellie "Unangiq" Jimmie

=== Independents ===
1. District 40: Thomas "Ikaaq" Baker (Note: Rep. Baker was appointed as a Republican in 2023.) was defeated by Democrat Robyn "Niayuq" Burke

== Results ==
| District | Incumbent | Party | Elected Representative | Party |
|---|---|---|---|---|
| 1 | Dan Ortiz† | Ind | Jeremy Bynum | Rep |
| 2 | Rebecca Himschoot | Ind | Rebecca Himschoot | Ind |
| 3 | Andi Story | Dem | Andi Story | Dem |
| 4 | Sara Hannan | Dem | Sara Hannan | Dem |
| 5 | Louise Stutes | Rep | Louise Stutes | Rep |
| 6 | Sarah Vance | Rep | Sarah Vance | Rep |
| 7 | Justin Ruffridge | Rep | Justin Ruffridge | Rep |
| 8 | Ben Carpenter† | Rep | Bill Elam | Rep |
| 9 | Laddie Shaw† | Rep | Ky Holland | Ind |
| 10 | Craig Johnson | Rep | Chuck Kopp | Rep |
| 11 | Julie Coulombe | Rep | Julie Coulombe | Rep |
| 12 | Calvin Schrage | Ind | Calvin Schrage | Ind |
| 13 | Andy Josephson | Dem | Andy Josephson | Dem |
| 14 | Alyse Galvin | Ind | Alyse Galvin | Ind |
| 15 | Tom McKay† | Rep | Mia Costello | Rep |
| 16 | Jennie Armstrong† | Dem | Carolyn Hall | Dem |
| 17 | Zack Fields | Dem | Zack Fields | Dem |
| 18 | Cliff Groh | Dem | David Nelson | Rep |
| 19 | Genevieve Mina | Dem | Genevieve Mina | Dem |
| 20 | Andrew Gray | Dem | Andrew Gray | Dem |
| 21 | Donna Mears | Dem | Donna Mears | Dem |
| 22 | Stanley Wright | Rep | Ted Eischeid | Dem |
| 23 | Jamie Allard | Rep | Jamie Allard | Rep |
| 24 | Dan Saddler | Rep | Dan Saddler | Rep |
| 25 | DeLena Johnson | Rep | DeLena Johnson | Rep |
| 26 | Cathy Tilton | Rep | Cathy Tilton | Rep |
| 27 | David Eastman | Rep | Jubilee Underwood | Rep |
| 28 | Jesse Sumner† | Rep | Elexie Moore | Rep |
| 29 | George Rauscher | Rep | George Rauscher | Rep |
| 30 | Kevin McCabe | Rep | Kevin McCabe | Rep |
| 31 | Maxine Dibert | Dem | Maxine Dibert | Dem |
| 32 | William Stapp | Rep | William Stapp | Rep |
| 33 | Mike Prax | Rep | Mike Prax | Rep |
| 34 | Frank Tomaszewski | Rep | Frank Tomaszewski | Rep |
| 35 | Ashley Carrick | Dem | Ashley Carrick | Dem |
| 36 | Mike Cronk† | Rep | Rebecca Schwanke | Rep |
| 37 | Bryce Edgmon | Ind | Bryce Edgmon | Ind |
| 38 | Conrad McCormick | Dem | Nellie Jimmie | Dem |
| 39 | Neal Foster | Dem | Neal Foster | Dem |
| 40 | Thomas Baker | Rep | Robyn Burke | Dem |

== Government formation ==
Democratic-led coalition: Democratic gain Democratic hold Independent gain Independent hold Republican gain Republican hold Republican caucus: Republican gain Republican hold

On November 6, the day after the election, Independent Bryce Edgmon announced that a new majority coalition would be formed based on preliminary results. Once results finalized, Edgmon announced that he would serve as speaker, a role he previously held from 2017 to 2021, and Republican Chuck Kopp would serve as majority leader of the new majority coalition consisting of 14 Democrats, 5 Independents, and 2 Republicans. The remaining 19 Republicans would caucus in the minority. Eastman, the sole Republican who did not caucus with either side, lost re-election to Republican Jubilee Underwood.

The 34th Alaska State Legislature began on January 21, 2025, and new members took office the same day. The House was also majority women with 21 members for the first time in Alaska's history.

== Detailed results ==
Certified candidate list:

=== District 1 ===
Incumbent Independent Dan Ortiz declined to seek re-election. Republican Jeremy Bynum faced nonpartisan candidates Agnes Moran and Grant Echohawk, whom he defeated with 52% of the vote.

Nonpartisan primary
| Party | Candidate | Votes | % |
|---|---|---|---|
| Republican | Jeremy Bynum | 1,437 | 49.0 |
| Independent | Grant Echohawk (Note: Listed on the ballot as "Nonpartisan") | 790 | 26.9 |
| Independent | Agnes Moran | 707 | 24.1 |
| Total votes | | 2,934 | 100.0 |

2024 Alaska House of Representatives election, District 1
| Party | Candidate | Votes | % |
|---|---|---|---|
| Republican | Jeremy Bynum | 4,242 | 52.0 |
| Independent | Agnes Moran | 1,995 | 24.4 |
| Independent | Grant Echohawk | 1,909 | 23.4 |
| Write-in | | 17 | 0.2 |
| Total votes | | 8,164 | 100.0 |
| Republican gain from Independent | | | |

=== District 2 ===
Incumbent nonpartisan Rebecca Himschoot was re-elected unopposed.

2024 Alaska House of Representatives election, District 2
| Party | Candidate | Votes | % |
|---|---|---|---|
| Independent | Rebecca Himschoot (incumbent) | 7,060 | 97.5 |
| Write-in | | 179 | 2.5 |
| Total votes | | 7,239 | 100.0 |
| Independent hold | | | |

=== District 3 ===
Incumbent Democrat Andi Story was re-elected unopposed.

2024 Alaska House of Representatives election, District 3
| Party | Candidate | Votes | % |
|---|---|---|---|
| Democratic | Andi Story (incumbent) | 7,961 | 96.0 |
| Write-in | | 330 | 4.0 |
| Total votes | | 8,291 | 100.0 |
| Democratic hold | | | |

=== District 4 ===
Incumbent Democrat Sara Hannan ran for re-election unopposed.

2024 Alaska House of Representatives election, District 4
| Party | Candidate | Votes | % |
|---|---|---|---|
| Democratic | Sara Hannan (incumbent) | 7,000 | 96.6 |
| Write-in | | 244 | 3.4 |
| Total votes | | 7,244 | 100.0 |
| Democratic hold | | | |

=== District 5 ===
Incumbent Republican Louise Stutes ran for re-election. She faced Libertarian Leighton Radner, whom she defeated by a 55-point margin.

Nonpartisan primary
| Party | Candidate | Votes | % |
|---|---|---|---|
| Republican | Louise Stutes (incumbent) | 1,566 | 80.4 |
| Libertarian | Leighton Radner | 381 | 19.6 |
| Total votes | | 1,947 | 100.0 |

2024 Alaska House of Representatives election, District 5
| Party | Candidate | Votes | % |
|---|---|---|---|
| Republican | Louise Stutes (incumbent) | 5,445 | 77.4 |
| Libertarian | Leighton Radner | 1,549 | 22.0 |
| Write-in | | 44 | 0.6 |
| Total votes | | 7,038 | 100.0 |
| Republican hold | | | |

=== District 6 ===
Incumbent Republican Sarah Vance ran for re-election. In the primary she faced nonpartisans Brent Johnson and Alana Greear, and Republican Dawson Slaughter, with Vance, Johnson, and Greear advancing to the general election. In advance of the general election, Greear withdrew and endorsed fellow independent Johnson, and Slaughter was automatically advanced to the general election as a result. In the initial results, Vance and Johnson were only separated by a margin of three points, with Slaughter holding 9.4% of the vote. Slaughter's elimination in the first round resulted in Vance gaining a majority of the vote and defeating Johnson by a 5-point margin.

Nonpartisan primary
| Party | Candidate | Votes | % |
|---|---|---|---|
| Republican | Sarah Vance (incumbent) | 1,998 | 43.2 |
| Independent | Brent Johnson | 1,569 | 34.0 |
| Independent | Alana Greear (withdrew) | 790 | 17.1 |
| Republican | Dawson Slaughter | 265 | 5.7 |
| Total votes | | 4,622 | 100.0 |

General election
| Party | Candidate | First choice | | | Round 1 | | | Round 2 | |
| Party | Candidate | Votes | % | Transfer | Votes | % | Transfer | Votes | % |
|---|---|---|---|---|---|---|---|---|---|
| Republican | Sarah Vance (incumbent) | 5,360 | 47.0% | +3 | 5,363 | 47.0% | +275 | 5,638 | 52.3% |
| Independent | Brent Johnson | 4,956 | 43.4% | +9 | 4,965 | 43.5% | +185 | 5,150 | 47.7% |
| Republican | Dawson R. Slaughter | 1,074 | 9.4% | +4 | 1,078 | 9.5% | 1,078 | Eliminated | |
| Write-in | | 27 | 0.2% | 27 | Eliminated | | | | |
| Total votes | | 11,417 | | | 11,406 | | | 10,788 | |
| Blank or inactive ballots | | | | | 392 | | +618 | 1,010 | |

=== District 7 ===
Incumbent Republican Justin Ruffridge ran for re-election. He defeated fellow Republican and former state representative Ron Gillham by 18 points.

Nonpartisan primary
| Party | Candidate | Votes | % |
|---|---|---|---|
| Republican | Justin Ruffridge (incumbent) | 1,630 | 59.7 |
| Republican | Ron Gillham | 1,101 | 40.3 |
| Total votes | | 2,731 | 100.0 |

2024 Alaska House of Representatives election, District 7
| Party | Candidate | Votes | % |
|---|---|---|---|
| Republican | Justin Ruffridge (incumbent) | 4,985 | 58.9 |
| Republican | Ron Gillham | 3,398 | 40.2 |
| Write-in | | 77 | 0.9 |
| Total votes | | 8,460 | 100.0 |
| Republican hold | | | |

=== District 8 ===
Incumbent Republican Ben Carpenter declined to seek re-election, instead unsuccessfully running for state senate. Bill Elam, a member of the Kenai Peninsula Borough Assembly, and brigadier general John Hillyer both ran to succeed Carpenter. The two Republicans both ran on a conservative platform, with differences in support for renewable energy; with Elam being open to using renewables, while Hillyer wanted to expand Alaska's natural resource extraction, and support for state education funding; with Elam supporting "reasonable" increases while Hillyer opposed any increases in funding. Elam defeated Hillyer in a close race by a margin of 4 points.

Nonpartisan primary
| Party | Candidate | Votes | % |
|---|---|---|---|
| Republican | John Hillyer | 1,625 | 50.8 |
| Republican | Bill Elam | 1,598 | 49.2 |
| Total votes | | 3,250 | 100.0 |

2024 Alaska House of Representatives elections, District 8
| Party | Candidate | Votes | % |
|---|---|---|---|
| Republican | Bill Elam | 4,655 | 51.5 |
| Republican | John Hillyer | 4,249 | 47.0 |
| Write-in | | 130 | 1.4 |
| Total votes | | 9,034 | 100.0 |
| Republican hold | | | |

=== District 9 ===
Incumbent Republican Laddie Shaw declined to seek re-election. In the lead-up to the primary election, four candidates all announced campaigns to succeed Shaw, nonpartisan Ky Holland, as well as Republicans Lucy Bauer, Lee Ellis, and Brandy Pennington. Following the primary election, Ellis and Pennington withdrew, with the former endorsing Holland while the latter endorsing Bauer. District 9 was identified as a key district to both the incumbent Republican coalition and to the Democratic minority, which hoped to form a coalition of their own in the next legislative session. During the campaign Holland campaigned on forming a new bipartisan coalition in the state legislature to counter governor Mike Dunleavy. In the general election, Holland defeated Bauer by 9 points.

Nonpartisan primary
| Party | Candidate | Votes | % |
|---|---|---|---|
| Independent | Ky Holland | 1,890 | 41.9 |
| Republican | Lucy Bauer | 936 | 20.7 |
| Republican | Lee Ellis (withdrew) | 875 | 19.4 |
| Republican | Brandy Pennington (withdrew) | 815 | 18.0 |
| Total votes | | 4,516 | 100.0 |

2024 Alaska House of Representatives election, District 9
| Party | Candidate | Votes | % |
|---|---|---|---|
| Independent | Ky Holland | 6,085 | 54.3 |
| Republican | Lucy Bauer | 5,093 | 45.5 |
| Write-in | | 29 | 0.3 |
| Total votes | | 11,207 | 100.0 |
| Independent gain from Republican | | | |

=== District 10 ===
Incumbent Republican Craig Johnson ran for re-election.

Nonpartisan primary
| Party | Candidate | Votes | % |
|---|---|---|---|
| Republican | Chuck Kopp | 1,449 | 60.5 |
| Republican | Craig Johnson (incumbent) | 947 | 39.5 |
| Total votes | | 2,396 | 100.0 |

2024 Alaska House of Representatives election, District 10
| Party | Candidate | Votes | % |
|---|---|---|---|
| Republican | Chuck Kopp | 4,669 | 61.6 |
| Republican | Craig Johnson (incumbent) | 2,811 | 37.1 |
| Write-in | | 101 | 1.3 |
| Total votes | | 7,581 | 100.0 |
| Republican hold | | | |

=== District 11 ===
Incumbent Republican Julie Coulombe defeated nonpartisan Walter Featherly.

Nonpartisan primary
| Party | Candidate | Votes | % |
|---|---|---|---|
| Republican | Julie Coulombe (incumbent) | 1,549 | 53.0 |
| Independent | Walter Featherly | 1,376 | 47.0 |
| Total votes | | 2,925 | 100.0 |

2024 Alaska House of Representatives election, District 11
| Party | Candidate | Votes | % |
|---|---|---|---|
| Republican | Julie Coulombe (incumbent) | 4,836 | 52.6 |
| Independent | Walter Featherly | 4,341 | 47.2 |
| Write-in | | 17 | 0.2 |
| Total votes | | 9,194 | 100.0 |
| Republican hold | | | |

=== District 12 ===
Incumbent nonpartisan Calvin Schrage defeated Republican Joe Lurtsema.

Nonpartisan primary
| Party | Candidate | Votes | % |
|---|---|---|---|
| Independent | Calvin Schrage (incumbent) | 1,390 | 65.0 |
| Republican | Joe Lurtsema | 750 | 35.1 |
| Total votes | | 2,140 | 100.0 |

2024 Alaska House of Representatives election, District 12
| Party | Candidate | Votes | % |
|---|---|---|---|
| Independent | Calvin Schrage (incumbent) | 4,763 | 60.8 |
| Republican | Joe Lurtsema | 3,041 | 38.8 |
| Write-in | | 27 | 0.3 |
| Total votes | | 7,831 | 100.0 |
| Independent hold | | | |

=== District 13 ===
Incumbent Democrat Andy Josephson defeated Republican Heather Gottshall.

Nonpartisan primary
| Party | Candidate | Votes | % |
|---|---|---|---|
| Democratic | Andy Josephson (incumbent) | 990 | 56.0 |
| Republican | Heather Gottshall | 777 | 44.0 |
| Total votes | | 1,767 | 100.0 |

2024 Alaska House of Representatives election, District 13
| Party | Candidate | Votes | % |
|---|---|---|---|
| Democratic | Andy Josephson (incumbent) | 3,743 | 53.3 |
| Republican | Heather Gottshall | 3,266 | 46.5 |
| Write-in | | 15 | 0.2 |
| Total votes | | 7,024 | 100.0 |
| Democratic hold | | | |

=== District 14 ===
Incumbent nonpartisan Alyse Galvin defeated Democrat Harry Kamdem.

Nonpartisan primary
| Party | Candidate | Votes | % |
|---|---|---|---|
| Independent | Alyse Galvin (incumbent) | 1,622 | 83.7 |
| Democratic | Harry Kamdem | 315 | 16.3 |
| Total votes | | 1,937 | 100.0 |

2024 Alaska House of Representatives election, District 14
| Party | Candidate | Votes | % |
|---|---|---|---|
| Independent | Alyse Galvin (incumbent) | 4,847 | 77.5 |
| Democratic | Harry Kamdem | 1,278 | 20.4 |
| Write-in | | 128 | 2.1 |
| Total votes | | 6,253 | 100.0 |
| Independent hold | | | |

=== District 15 ===
Incumbent Republican Thomas McKay declined to seek re-election. Republican and former Senate majority leader Mia Costello defeated Democrats Denny Wells and Dustin Darden.

Nonpartisan primary
| Party | Candidate | Votes | % |
|---|---|---|---|
| Republican | Mia Costello | 1,423 | 51.4 |
| Democratic | Denny Wells | 1,225 | 44.3 |
| Democratic | Dustin Darden | 120 | 4.3 |
| Total votes | | 2,768 | 100.0 |

2024 Alaska House of Representatives election, District 15
| Party | Candidate | Votes | % |
|---|---|---|---|
| Republican | Mia Costello | 4,543 | 51.5 |
| Democratic | Denny Wells | 4,014 | 45.5 |
| Democratic | Dustin Darden | 242 | 2.8 |
| Write-in | | 17 | 0.2 |
| Total votes | | 8,816 | 100.0 |
| Republican hold | | | |

=== District 16 ===
Incumbent Democrat Jennifer Armstrong declined to seek re-election. Two candidates initially filed to run, Democrat Carolyn Hall and Independent Nick Moe. Following the primary election, Moe withdrew and endorsed Hall, leaving her effectively unopposed. Despite having withdrawn, Moe was unable to have his name removed from the ballot as he failed to meet the withdrawal deadline. In the general election, Hall won a 14-point victory over Moe.

Nonpartisan primary
| Party | Candidate | Votes | % |
|---|---|---|---|
| Democratic | Carolyn Hall | 2,023 | 62.5 |
| Independent | Nick Moe (withdrawn) | 1,214 | 37.5 |
| Total votes | | 3,237 | 100.0 |

2024 Alaska House of Representatives election, District 16
| Party | Candidate | Votes | % |
|---|---|---|---|
| Democratic | Carolyn Hall | 4,860 | 56.6 |
| Independent | Nick Moe (withdrawn) | 3,649 | 42.5 |
| Write-in | | 83 | 1.0 |
| Total votes | | 8,592 | 100.0 |
| Democratic hold | | | |

=== District 17 ===
Incumbent Democrat Zack Fields ran for re-election unopposed.

2024 Alaska House of Representatives election, District 17
| Party | Candidate | Votes | % |
|---|---|---|---|
| Democratic | Zack Fields (incumbent) | 5,243 | 93.6 |
| Write-in | | 361 | 6.4 |
| Total votes | | 5,604 | 100.0 |
| Democratic hold | | | |

=== District 18 ===
Incumbent Democrat Cliff Groh ran for re-election. Groh was defeated by Republican and former state legislator David Nelson in a rematch from the 2022 election in this district.

Nonpartisan primary
| Party | Candidate | Votes | % |
|---|---|---|---|
| Democratic | Cliff Groh (incumbent) | 379 | 64.2 |
| Republican | David Nelson | 211 | 35.8 |
| Total votes | | 590 | 100.0 |

2024 Alaska House of Representatives election, District 18
| Party | Candidate | Votes | % |
|---|---|---|---|
| Republican | David Nelson | 1,878 | 50.2 |
| Democratic | Cliff Groh (incumbent) | 1,856 | 49.7 |
| Write-in | | 3 | 0.1 |
| Total votes | | 3,737 | 100.0 |
| Republican gain from Democratic | | | |

=== District 19 ===
Incumbent Democrat Genevieve Mina ran for re-election. She defeated Republican Kaylee Anderson as well as nonpartisan Russell Wyatt.

Nonpartisan primary
| Party | Candidate | Votes | % |
|---|---|---|---|
| Democratic | Genevieve Mina (incumbent) | 775 | 69.4 |
| Republican | Kaylee Anderson | 284 | 25.4 |
| Independent | Russell Wyatt (Note: Listed on the ballot as "Undeclared") | 58 | 5.2 |
| Total votes | | 1,117 | 100.0 |

==== General ====
2024 Alaska House of Representatives election, District 19
| Party | Candidate | Votes | % |
|---|---|---|---|
| Democratic | Genevieve Mina (incumbent) | 2,654 | 60.8 |
| Republican | Kaylee Anderson | 1,353 | 31.0 |
| Independent | Russell Wyatt | 338 | 7.8 |
| Write-in | | 18 | 0.4 |
| Total votes | | 4,363 | 100.0 |
| Democratic hold | | | |

=== District 20 ===
Incumbent Democrat Andrew Gray ran for re-election. He defeated Libertarian Scott Kohlhaas.

Nonpartisan primary
| Party | Candidate | Votes | % |
|---|---|---|---|
| Democratic | Andrew Gray (incumbent) | 1,122 | 67.5 |
| Libertarian | Scott Kohlhaas | 540 | 32.5 |
| Total votes | | 1,662 | 100.0 |

2024 Alaska House of Representatives election, District 20
| Party | Candidate | Votes | % |
|---|---|---|---|
| Democratic | Andrew Gray (incumbent) | 3,927 | 63.8 |
| Libertarian | Scott Kohlhaas | 2,163 | 35.1 |
| Write-in | | 67 | 1.1 |
| Total votes | | 6,157 | 100.0 |
| Democratic hold | | | |

=== District 21 ===
Incumbent Democrat Donna Mears ran for re-election. She defeated. Republican Aimée Sims

Nonpartisan primary
| Party | Candidate | Votes | % |
|---|---|---|---|
| Democratic | Donna Mears (incumbent) | 1,402 | 56.8 |
| Republican | Aimée Sims | 1,067 | 43.2 |
| Total votes | | 2,469 | 100.0 |

2024 Alaska House of Representatives election, District 21
| Party | Candidate | Votes | % |
|---|---|---|---|
| Democratic | Donna Mears (incumbent) | 4,664 | 55.4 |
| Republican | Aimée Sims | 3,743 | 44.4 |
| Write-in | | 20 | 0.2 |
| Total votes | | 8,427 | 100.0 |
| Democratic hold | | | |

=== District 22 ===
Incumbent Republican Stanley Wright ran for re-election. He was defeated by Democrat Ted Eischeid.

Nonpartisan primary
| Party | Candidate | Votes | % |
|---|---|---|---|
| Democratic | Ted Eischeid | 625 | 51.4 |
| Republican | Stanley Wright (incumbent) | 590 | 48.6 |
| Total votes | | 1,215 | 100.0 |

2024 Alaska House of Representatives election, District 22
| Party | Candidate | Votes | % |
|---|---|---|---|
| Democratic | Ted Eischeid | 2,633 | 52.4 |
| Republican | Stanley Wright (incumbent) | 2,382 | 47.4 |
| Write-in | | 12 | 0.2 |
| Total votes | | 5,027 | 100.0 |
| Democratic gain from Republican | | | |

=== District 23 ===
Incumbent Republican Jamie Allard ran for re-election. She defeated Democrat Jim Arlington.

Nonpartisan primary
| Party | Candidate | Votes | % |
|---|---|---|---|
| Republican | Jamie Allard (incumbent) | 2,008 | 58.6 |
| Democratic | Jim Arlington | 1,417 | 41.4 |
| Total votes | | 3,425 | 100.0 |

2024 Alaska House of Representatives election, District 23
| Party | Candidate | Votes | % |
|---|---|---|---|
| Republican | Jamie Allard (incumbent) | 6,132 | 61.8 |
| Democratic | Jim Arlington | 3,747 | 37.8 |
| Write-in | | 37 | 0.4 |
| Total votes | | 9,916 | 100.0 |
| Republican hold | | | |

=== District 24 ===
Incumbent Republican Dan Saddler ran for re-election unopposed.

2024 Alaska House of Representatives election, District 24
| Party | Candidate | Votes | % |
|---|---|---|---|
| Republican | Dan Saddler (incumbent) | 7,981 | 96.8 |
| Write-in | | 262 | 3.2 |
| Total votes | | 8,243 | 100.0 |
| Republican hold | | | |

=== District 25 ===
Incumbent Republican DeLena Johnson ran for re-election unopposed.

2024 Alaska House of Representatives election, District 25
| Party | Candidate | Votes | % |
|---|---|---|---|
| Republican | DeLena Johnson (incumbent) | 7,817 | 95.9 |
| Write-in | | 338 | 4.1 |
| Total votes | | 8,155 | 100.0 |
| Republican hold | | | |

=== District 26 ===
Incumbent Republican and Speaker of the House Cathy Tilton ran for re-election unopposed.

2024 Alaska House of Representatives election, District 26
| Party | Candidate | Votes | % |
|---|---|---|---|
| Republican | Cathy Tilton (incumbent) | 7,353 | 96.7 |
| Write-in | | 254 | 3.3 |
| Total votes | | 7,607 | 100.0 |
| Republican hold | | | |

=== District 27 ===
Incumbent Republican David Eastman ran for re-election. He was defeated by fellow Republican Jubilee Underwood.

Nonpartisan primary
| Party | Candidate | Votes | % |
|---|---|---|---|
| Republican | David Eastman (incumbent) | 1,226 | 61.7 |
| Republican | Jubilee Underwood | 756 | 38.1 |
| Total votes | | 1,982 | 100.0 |

2024 Alaska House of Representatives election, District 27
| Party | Candidate | Votes | % |
|---|---|---|---|
| Republican | Jubilee Underwood | 3,856 | 50.6 |
| Republican | David Eastman (incumbent) | 3,660 | 48.1 |
| Write-in | | 99 | 1.3 |
| Total votes | | 7,615 | 100.0 |
| Republican hold | | | |

=== District 28 ===
Incumbent Republican Jesse Sumner initially ran for re-election. After the primary election, Sumner withdrew from the race, citing family concerns. Republican Elexie Moore defeated fellow Republican Steve Menard in the second round of ranked choice voting by a margin of 0.2%.

Nonpartisan primary
| Party | Candidate | Votes | % |
|---|---|---|---|
| Republican | Jesse Sumner (incumbent, withdrew) | 727 | 33.0 |
| Republican | Steve Menard | 608 | 27.6 |
| Republican | Elexie Moore | 508 | 23.1 |
| Republican | Jessica Wright | 359 | 16.3 |
| Total votes | | 2,202 | 100.0 |

General election
| Party | Candidate | First choice | | | Round 1 | | | Round 2 | |
| Party | Candidate | Votes | % | Transfer | Votes | % | Transfer | Votes | % |
|---|---|---|---|---|---|---|---|---|---|
| Republican | Elexie Moore | 2,911 | 37.3% | +18 | 2,929 | 37.9% | +314 | 3,243 | 50.1% |
| Republican | Steve Menard | 2,777 | 35.6% | +10 | 2,787 | 36.0% | +444 | 3,231 | 49.9% |
| Republican | Jessica Wright | 1,997 | 25.6% | +17 | 2,014 | 26.1% | -2,014 | Eliminated | |
| Write-in | | 115 | 1.5% | -115 | Eliminated | | | | |
| Total votes | | 7,800 | | | 7,730 | | | 6,474 | |
| Blank or inactive ballots | | | | | 1,185 | | +1,256 | 2,441 | |

=== District 29 ===
Incumbent Republican George Rauscher ran for re-election unopposed.

2024 Alaska House of Representatives election, District 29
| Party | Candidate | Votes | % |
|---|---|---|---|
| Republican | George Rauscher (incumbent) | 7,807 | 95.6 |
| Write-in | | 363 | 4.4 |
| Total votes | | 8,170 | 100.0 |
| Republican hold | | | |

=== District 30 ===
Incumbent Republican Kevin J. McCabe ran for re-election. He defeated fellow Republican Doyle Holmes

Nonpartisan primary
| Party | Candidate | Votes | % |
|---|---|---|---|
| Republican | Kevin J. McCabe (incumbent) | 1,483 | 54.6 |
| Republican | Doyle Holmes | 1,226 | 45.3 |
| Total votes | | 2,709 | 100.0 |

2024 Alaska House of Representatives general election, district 30
| Party | Candidate | Votes | % |
|---|---|---|---|
| Republican | Kevin J. McCabe (incumbent) | 4,731 | 54.1 |
| Republican | Doyle Holmes | 3,846 | 44.0 |
| Write-in | | 163 | 1.9 |
| Total votes | | 8,740 | 100.0 |
| Republican hold | | | |

=== District 31 ===
Incumbent Democrat Maxine Dibert ran for re-election. She defeated former state legislator Bart LeBon in a rematch from 2022.

Nonpartisan primary
| Party | Candidate | Votes | % |
|---|---|---|---|
| Democratic | Maxine Dibert (incumbent) | 1,109 | 51.5 |
| Republican | Bart LeBon | 1,045 | 48.5 |
| Total votes | | 2,154 | 100.0 |

2024 Alaska House of Representatives election, District 31
| Party | Candidate | Votes | % |
|---|---|---|---|
| Democratic | Maxine Dibert (incumbent) | 3,518 | 54.2 |
| Republican | Bart LeBon | 2,948 | 45.5 |
| Write-in | | 20 | 0.3 |
| Total votes | | 6,486 | 100.0 |
| Democratic hold | | | |

=== District 32 ===
Incumbent Republican Will Stapp ran for re-election. He defeated Democrat Gary Damron.

Nonpartisan primary
| Party | Candidate | Votes | % |
|---|---|---|---|
| Republican | Will Stapp (incumbent) | 821 | 66.1 |
| Democratic | Gary Damron | 421 | 33.9 |
| Total votes | | 1,242 | 100.0 |

2024 Alaska House of Representatives election, District 32
| Party | Candidate | Votes | % |
|---|---|---|---|
| Republican | Will Stapp (incumbent) | 3,227 | 67.3 |
| Democratic | Gary Damron | 1,548 | 32.3 |
| Write-in | | 21 | 0.4 |
| Total votes | | 4,796 | 100.0 |
| Republican hold | | | |

=== District 33 ===
Incumbent Republican Mike Prax ran for re-election unopposed.

2024 Alaska House of Representatives election, District 33
| Party | Candidate | Votes | % |
|---|---|---|---|
| Republican | Mike Prax (incumbent) | 6,966 | 96.8 |
| Write-in | | 234 | 3.2 |
| Total votes | | 7,200 | 100.0 |
| Republican hold | | | |

=== District 34 ===
Incumbent Republican Frank Tomaszewski ran for re-election. He defeated fellow Republican Joy Beth Cottle.

Nonpartisan primary
| Party | Candidate | Votes | % |
|---|---|---|---|
| Republican | Frank Tomaszewski (incumbent) | 1,667 | 53.4 |
| Republican | Joy Beth Cottle | 1,445 | 46.4 |
| Total votes | | 3,112 | 100.0 |

2024 Alaska House of Representatives election, District 34
| Party | Candidate | Votes | % |
|---|---|---|---|
| Republican | Frank Tomaszewski (incumbent) | 4,887 | 56.0 |
| Republican | Joy Beth Cottle | 3,765 | 43.1 |
| Write-in | | 83 | 1.0 |
| Total votes | | 8,735 | 100.0 |
| Republican hold | | | |

=== District 35 ===
Incumbent Democrat Ashley Carrick ran for re-election. She defeated Republican Ruben McNeill.

Nonpartisan primary
| Party | Candidate | Votes | % |
|---|---|---|---|
| Democratic | Ashley Carrick (incumbent) | 2,332 | 60.6 |
| Republican | Ruben McNeill | 1,517 | 39.4 |
| Total votes | | 3,849 | 100.0 |

2024 Alaska House of Representatives election, District 35
| Party | Candidate | Votes | % |
|---|---|---|---|
| Democratic | Ashley Carrick (incumbent) | 5,047 | 55.2 |
| Republican | Ruben McNeill | 4,066 | 44.5 |
| Write-in | | 23 | 0.2 |
| Total votes | | 9,136 | 100.0 |
| Democratic hold | | | |

=== District 36 ===
Incumbent Republican Mike Cronk declined to seek re-election, instead running for state senate. Initially, four Republicans filed to succeed Cronk; perennial candidate and legislative aide Pamela Goode, defense contractor Dana Mock, business owner Rebecca Schwanke, Cole Snodgress. Outside of the Republican field, one Democrat and one Libertarian filed to succeed Cronk, those two candidates being welder Brandon Kowalski and business owner James Fields respectively. During the primary campaign, three of the four Republican candidates agreed on most issues, while Goode, the more far right candidate, disagreed with the other Republicans in the race on most issues. Another additional split was with Cole, who supported increases to the state's education funding. Following the primary election, Snodgress and Mock withdrew from the ballot to help boost Schwanke's chances in the election, which allowed Fields to advance to the general election. Fields also withdrew from the race shortly after the primary, but had missed the deadline to have his name removed from the ballot.

During the general election campaign the two Republican candidates expressed concerns that the presence of two Republicans on the ballot, as well as not enough voters ranking both Republicans on their ballots, could lead to Kowalski, the Democratic candidate, winning the seat. In the general election, the vote split three ways between Schwanke, Kowalski, and Goode, with each having 35%, 33%, and 25% respectively. In the third and final round of ranked choice voting, Schwanke defeated Kowalski by a 13-point margin.

Nonpartisan primary
| Party | Candidate | Votes | % |
|---|---|---|---|
| Democratic | Brandon "Putuuqti" Kowalski | 1,264 | 33.8 |
| Republican | Rebecca Schwanke | 768 | 20.5 |
| Republican | Pamela Goode | 529 | 14.1 |
| Republican | Cole Snodgress (withdrew) | 515 | 13.8 |
| Republican | Dana Mock (withdrew) | 426 | 11.5 |
| Libertarian | James Fields | 239 | 6.4 |
| Total votes | | 3,741 | 100.0 |

General election
| Party | Candidate | First choice | | | Round 1 | | | Round 2 | | | Round 3 | |
| Party | Candidate | Votes | % | Transfer | Votes | % | Transfer | Votes | % | Transfer | Votes | % |
|---|---|---|---|---|---|---|---|---|---|---|---|---|
| Republican | Rebecca Schwanke | 3,180 | 35.7% | +9 | 3,189 | 35.7% | +93 | 3,282 | 37.9% | +788 | 4,070 | 56.3% |
| Democratic | Brandon "Putuuqti" Kowalski | 2,946 | 33.0% | +7 | 2,953 | 33.1% | +69 | 3,022 | 34.9% | +133 | 3,155 | 43.7% |
| Republican | Pamela Goode | 2,276 | 25.5% | +15 | 2,291 | 25.7% | +71 | 2,362 | 27.3% | -2,362 | Eliminated | |
| Libertarian | James Fields (withdrawn) | 491 | 5.5% | +7 | 498 | 5.6% | -498 | Eliminated | | | | |
| Write-in | | 23 | 0.3% | -23 | Eliminated | | | | | | | |
| Total votes | | 8,916 | | | 8,931 | | | 8,666 | | | 7,225 | |
| Blank or inactive ballots | | | | | 451 | | +265 | 716 | | +1,441 | 2,157 | |

=== District 37 ===
Incumbent nonpartisan Bryce Edgmon ran for re-election. He defeated fellow nonpartisan Darren Deacon by a wide margin.

Nonpartisan primary
| Party | Candidate | Votes | % |
|---|---|---|---|
| Independent | Bryce Edgmon (incumbent) | 852 | 69.0 |
| Independent | Darren Deacon | 383 | 31.0 |
| Total votes | | 1,235 | 100.0 |

2024 Alaska House of Representatives election, District 37
| Party | Candidate | Votes | % |
|---|---|---|---|
| Independent | Bryce Edgmon (incumbent) | 2,748 | 72.5 |
| Independent | Darren Deacon | 1,002 | 26.4 |
| Write-in | | 41 | 1.1 |
| Total votes | | 3,791 | 100.0 |
| Independent hold | | | |

=== District 38 ===
Incumbent Democrat Conrad McCormick ran for re-election. During the primary he faced fellow Democrats Nellie Jimmie and Victoria Sosa, as well as Veterans of Alaska candidate Willy Keppel. During the 33rd Alaska State Legislature, McCormick was part of the Republican coalition which governed the state house. In late October, Sosa withdrew from the campaign and endorsed Jimmie, despite this she remained on the ballot. In the first round of voting, Jimmie led McCormick by roughly 4 points. In the final round of ranked choice voting, Jimmie defeated McCormick by 5 points.

Nonpartisan primary
| Party | Candidate | Votes | % |
|---|---|---|---|
| Democratic | Nellie "Unangiq" Jimmie | 660 | 43.8 |
| Democratic | Conrad McCormick (incumbent) | 426 | 28.3 |
| Veterans of Alaska | Willy Keppel | 309 | 20.5 |
| Democratic | Victoria Sosa | 111 | 7.4 |
| Total votes | | 1,506 | 100.0 |

General election
| Party | Candidate | First Choice | | Round 1 | | | Round 2 | | | Round 3 | |
| Party | Candidate | Votes | % | Votes | % | Transfer | Votes | % | Transfer | Votes | % |
|---|---|---|---|---|---|---|---|---|---|---|---|
| Democratic | Nellie "Unangiq" Jimmie | 1,380 | 36.7% | 1,295 | 36.2% | +56 | 1,351 | 38.5% | +197 | 1,548 | 52.3% |
| Democratic | Conrad McCormick (incumbent) | 1,212 | 32.2% | 1,166 | 32.6% | +34 | 1,200 | 34.2% | +211 | 1,411 | 47.7% |
| Veterans of Alaska | Willy Keppel | 971 | 25.8% | 932 | 26.1% | +27 | 959 | 27.3% | -959 | Eliminated | |
| Democratic | Victoria Sosa (withdrawn) | 187 | 5.0% | 184 | 5.1% | -184 | Eliminated | | | | |
| Write-in | | 13 | 0.4% | Eliminated | | | | | | | |
| Total votes | | 3,763 | | 3,577 | | | 3,510 | | | 2,959 | |
| Blank or inactive ballots | | | | 130 | | +67 | 197 | | +551 | 748 | |

=== District 39 ===
Incumbent Democrat Neal Foster ran for re-election. He defeated Independence candidate Tyler Ivanoff.

Nonpartisan primary
| Party | Candidate | Votes | % |
|---|---|---|---|
| Democratic | Neal Foster (incumbent) | 1,057 | 64.3 |
| Independence | Tyler Ivanoff | 587 | 35.7 |
| Total votes | | 1,644 | 100.0 |

2024 Alaska House of Representatives election, District 39
| Party | Candidate | Votes | % |
|---|---|---|---|
| Democratic | Neal Foster (incumbent) | 2,333 | 58.1 |
| Independence | Tyler Ivanoff | 1,670 | 41.6 |
| Write-in | | 11 | 0.3 |
| Total votes | | 4,014 | 100.0 |
| Democratic hold | | | |

=== District 40 ===
Incumbent Republican Thomas Baker ran for re-election, but switched his party affiliation to "Undeclared". He was eliminated in the first round of ranked choice voting and defeated for re-election. Democrat Robyn Burke defeated fellow Democrat Saima Chase by a 21-point margin.

Nonpartisan primary
| Party | Candidate | Votes | % |
|---|---|---|---|
| Democratic | Saima "Ikrik" Chase | 345 | 35.6 |
| Democratic | Robyn "Niayuq" Burke | 342 | 35.3 |
| Independent | Thomas "Ikaaq" Baker (incumbent) | 281 | 29.0 |
| Total votes | | 968 | 100.0 |

General election
| Party | Candidate | First Choice | | Round 1 | | | Round 2 | |
| Party | Candidate | Votes | % | Votes | % | Transfer | Votes | % |
|---|---|---|---|---|---|---|---|---|
| Democratic | Robyn "Niayuq" Burke | 1,417 | 46.7% | 1,425 | 46.8% | +116 | 1,541 | 60.5% |
| Democratic | Saima "Ikrik" Chase | 863 | 28.4% | 874 | 28.7% | +134 | 1,008 | 39.5% |
| Undeclared | Thomas "Ikaaq" Baker (incumbent) | 731 | 24.1% | 743 | 24.4% | -743 | Eliminated | |
| Write-in | | 21 | 0.7% | Eliminated | | | | |
| Total votes | | 3,032 | | 3,042 | | | 2,549 | |
| Blank or inactive ballots | | | | 128 | | +493 | 621 | |

== See also ==
- Elections in Alaska
- List of Alaska State Legislatures
