= Tammie Wilson =

American politician

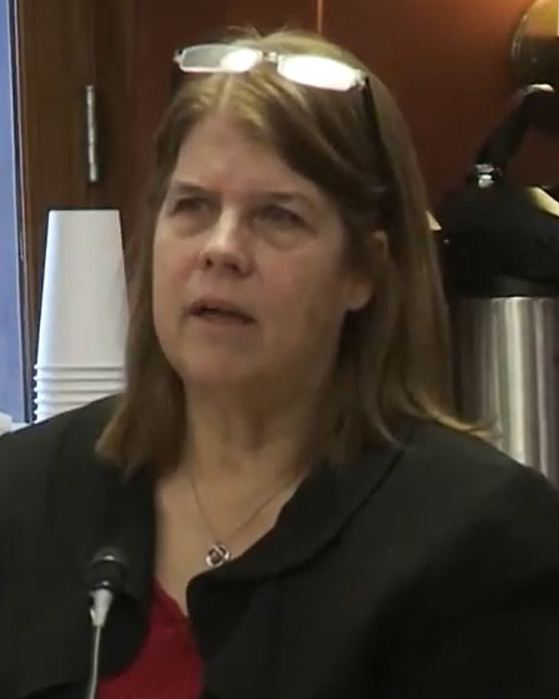
- Wilson in 2019

Member of the Alaska House of Representatives from the 3rd district
- In office December 3, 2009 – January 24, 2020
- Preceded by: John Coghill
- Succeeded by: Mike Prax

Personal details
- Born: c. 1961 64–65
- Party: Republican
- Spouse: Robert Wilson (?-July 5th,2021)
- Education: Illinois State University
- Occupation: Automotive shop owner

Tammie Wilson (born c. 1961) is an American politician who served as a member of the Alaska House of Representatives, representing District 3.

Wilson ran for the Fairbanks North Star Borough (FNSB) Assembly each year from 2006 to 2008. In 2006 she challenged incumbent Charlie Rex. Rex was reelected by an extremely narrow margin.

Wilson mounted another campaign for Assembly in 2007, finishing second, before being elected the following year, running unopposed that time. In 2009 she ran for FNSB Mayor, as incumbent Jim Whitaker was term-limited. She was supported by Francis "Schaeffer" Cox, a militia leader who spoke and tabled at a fundraiser for her. She came in second out of six candidates in the regular election. As no candidate achieved a 40% plurality, Wilson and first-place finisher Luke Hopkins faced each other in a runoff election. Hopkins won by 844 votes out of over 17,000 votes cast. While she attributed her political involvement to defense of junkyards (that would personally impact her), Wilson's campaign was dogged by revelation of a long-standing formal complaint against her junkyard (lack of screening).

Gene Therriault resigned from the Alaska Senate in 2009 to take a position as senior energy policy adviser to Alaska Governor Sean Parnell. John Coghill, the representative for District 11, was appointed to take Therriault's place. Parnell announced on November 24, 2009, that Wilson would be appointed to the House seat. She was sworn in on December 3, 2009, in Fairbanks by Lt. Governor Craig Campbell. She won election on her own under the state's 2011 redistricting plan, that placed her into a new District 2. Wilson was assigned positions on the Transportation, Health and Social Services, Labor and Commerce, Military & Veterans Affairs, and the Joint Armed Services committees in the House. She was reelected in 2012, 2014, 2016 and 2018. In July 2015 Wilson announced her intention to run again for borough mayor. She was defeated in the October election by Karl Kassel, who garnered 57% of the vote. On January 24, 2020, she announced her resignation from her House seat in order to become a policy adviser at the Alaska Department of Health and Human Services. She had long maintained an interest in the operations of the Office of Children's Services (OCS) within that department.
