= Statewide Suicide Prevention Council =

The Statewide Suicide Prevention Council of the state of Alaska advises the Governor and legislature on issues relating to suicide. In collaboration with communities, faith-based organizations, and public-private entities, the council works to improve the health and wellness of Alaskans by reducing suicide and its effect on individuals and communities. The home-base of the Statewide Suicide Prevention Council is Juneau, Alaska's capital.

The Statewide Suicide Prevention Council was established by the Alaska Legislature in 2001, in response to what was characterized as ‘an on-going epidemic’ of suicide. After a legislative audit in 2008, the council was extended by Legislature to June 30, 2030.

== Mission ==
The goals and responsibilities of the council are to improve Alaskans’ health and wellness by reducing suicide, improving public awareness of suicide and risk factors, enhancing suicide prevention efforts, working with partners and faith-based organizations to develop healthier communities, creating a statewide suicide prevention plan and putting it in action, and building and strengthening partnerships to prevent suicide. The goals and responsibilities are established by the Alaska Statutes, section 44.29.350, in which it is also recorded that the Council serves in an advisory capacity to the legislature and the Governor.

== History ==
In 2001, a series of ‘suicide clusters’ throughout Alaska led state leaders to more closely examine the issue. Senate Bill 198 was approved on May 7, 2001, establishing the Statewide Suicide Prevention Council. The council had its first meeting on November 12, 2001, in Anchorage. In 2008, a legislative audit extended the council by Legislature to June 30, 2030.

== Members ==
In 2011, House Bill 21 passed House, increasing the number of members of the Statewide Suicide Prevention Council from 16 to 17 members. The additional member gives representation on the council for members of the military, for suicide among the military is on the rise. As of 2011, the council has thirteen voting members from the public, appointed by the Governor, and four non-voting members from the legislature. The members include:

- one person representing the Department of Health and Social Services;
- one person representing the Department of Education and Early Development;
- one person from the advisory board on Alcoholism and Drug Abuse
- one person from the Alaska Mental Health Board;
- one person recommended by the Alaska Federation of Natives;
- one person who works for a high school;
- one person who is active in a youth organization;
- one person who has experienced the death by suicide of a member of their family;
- one person who resides in a rural Alaska community not on the road system;
- one person who is a member of the clergy;
- one person who is between 16 and 20 years of age when appointed;
- one person who works, or has previously worked, with the armed services;
- and one public member.

The President of the Alaska State Senate and the Speaker of the House appoint the four non-voting members of the council. The Senate President appoints one majority and one minority member of the Senate, and the Speaker appoints one majority and one minority member of the House of Representatives. The Governor will appoint the members of the council for staggered terms of four years. A vacancy of a member on the council will be filled by appointment of the Governor for the unexpired part of the vacated term. Members of the Council serve at the pleasure of the Governor. This means that the Governor has the right to replace a member who, by poor attendance (the failure to attend three or more consecutive meetings) or lack of contribution to the council's work, demonstrates ineffectiveness as a member.

== Organization ==
The Council meets and votes, by teleconference or otherwise, as often as is considered necessary by the presiding officer of the council. At least seven members of the council should participate in a meeting by person or teleconference for the transaction of business and the exercise of the powers and duties of the council. The Council comes together approximately four times a year. Each meeting is held in a different part of Alaska.

The Council annually reports its findings and recommendations in a report to the Governor, the president of the Senate, and the speaker of the house of representatives by March 1 each year. In the annual report, the suicide prevention efforts of the previous year are reviewed and evaluated.

The 2010 annual report, released mid-January 2011, is called Mending the Net, referring to the many individuals and organizations that work to prevent suicide all over Alaska, who are very dedicated, but often feel disconnected and unsupported. By ‘mending’ the suicide prevention systems ‘net’, the Council hopes to increase the effectiveness of local suicide prevention efforts, support the spread of effective ideas to other Alaskan communities, recognize the work of every person trying to prevent suicide, and honor the losses to families and communities caused by suicide.

== External links and further reading ==
- "'Mending the Net', the 2010 report of the Statewide Suicide Prevention Council" (PDF). Hss.state.ak.us.
