= Cliff Groh =

American politician

- Groh in 2023

Member of the Alaska House of Representatives from the 18th district
- In office January 17, 2023 – January 21, 2025
- Preceded by: David Nelson
- Succeeded by: David Nelson

Personal details
- Born: March 3, 1954 (age 72) Anchorage, Alaska
- Party: Democratic

Clifford John Groh II (Cliff Groh) (born March 3, 1954, in Anchorage) is an American politician. A Democrat, he was elected to the Alaska House of Representatives for the Alaska House District 18 in round two of the Alaska 2022 General Election ranked-choice process. Cliff Groh is a lawyer receiving degrees from Harvard College and UC Berkeley School of Law. Cliff Groh's father, Clifford John Groh, also known as Cliff Groh, served as an Alaska State Senator from 1971 to 1974.

== Electoral history ==
=== 2024 ===
==== Primary ====
Nonpartisan primary
Party	Candidate	Votes	%
Democratic	Cliff Groh (incumbent)	379	64.2
Republican	David Nelson	211	35.8
Total votes		590	100.0

==== General ====
2024 Alaska House of Representatives election, District 18
Party	Candidate	Votes	%
Republican	David Nelson	1,878	50.2
Democratic	Cliff Groh (incumbent)	1,856	49.7
Write-in		3	0.1
Total votes		3,737	100.0
Republican gain from Democratic			
