= David Eastman (politician) =

American politician

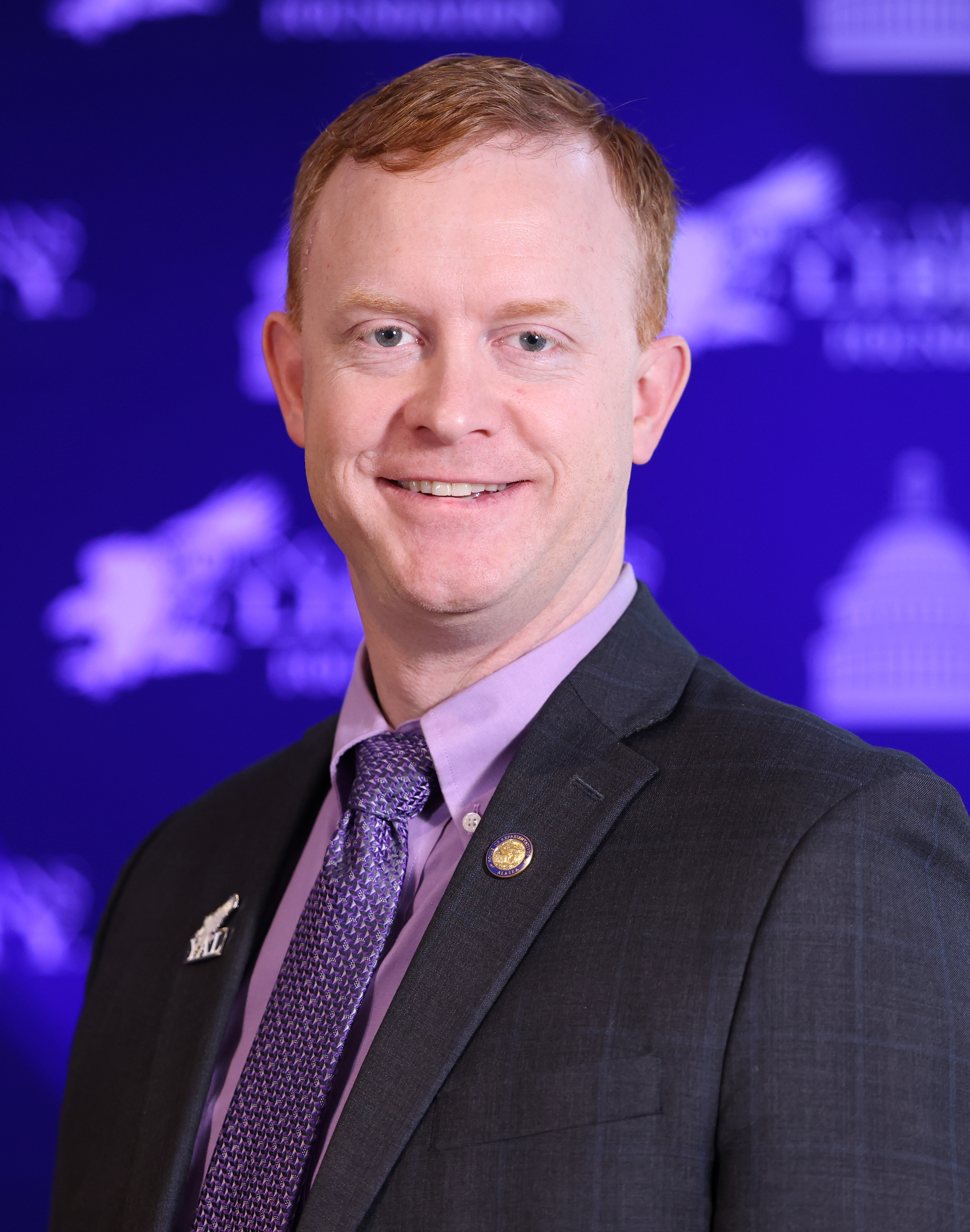
- Eastman at the 2024 Hazlitt Summit hosted by Young Americans for Liberty Foundation

Member of the Alaska House of Representatives
- In office January 17, 2017 – January 21, 2025
- Preceded by: Wes Keller
- Succeeded by: Jubilee Underwood
- Constituency: 10th district (2017-2023); 27th district (2023–2025)

Personal details
- Born: June 11, 1981 (age 45) Redwood City, California, U.S.
- Party: Republican

Military service
- Allegiance: United States
- Branch/service: United States Army
- Rank: Captain
- Unit: 164th Military Police Company
- Battles/wars: Operation Enduring Freedom

David C. Eastman Jr. (born June 1, 1981) is a former Republican member of the Alaska House of Representatives, representing District 27 until January 2025. He originally represented District 10 from 2017 until 2022. His career has been marked by various controversial statements and political positions.

Following his re-election in 2022, attempts were made to disqualify him from office due to his membership in the far-right Oath Keepers militia after the group participated in the January 6 United States Capitol attack, at which he was personally present.

== Early life and military career ==
Eastman was born on June 1, 1981, in Redwood City, California, growing up in Orange County. He was both homeschooled and attended private school before attending West Point. After graduating West Point, Eastman joined the United States Army where he was a military police captain stationed at Fort Richardson from 2003 to 2011. He was also deployed to Afghanistan as a part of the 164th Military Police Company during Operation Enduring Freedom.

== Political career ==
In April 2012, Eastman was named by Republicans in House District 13 as one of their choices to fill the Alaska State House seat left vacant by the death of Rep. Carl Gatto. Shelley Hughes was ultimately selected to fill the seat by Alaska's governor.

In 2016, Eastman defeated Wes Keller, the Republican incumbent of Alaska's 10th House District by 196 votes in a primary challenge.

In 2020, he was removed from his position on the ethics committee after it was found that he violated the state ethics law in 2018 by disclosing confidential information.

Despite several attempts to disqualify him from eligibility for elected office, on August 16, 2022, Eastman received 52.06% of the vote in the ranked-choice open primary election for the 27th Alaska House District (Eastman's new district after Alaska redistricting went into effect).

On January 22, 2024, Eastman was removed from the only remaining committee seat he held, on House Judiciary, as he was no longer affiliated with the minority caucus.

== Political positions ==
=== Abortion ===
Eastman is against abortion in all forms. He tried to add a right-to-life amendment to a non-controversial resolution in 2017 that designated April as Sexual Assault Awareness Month, and filed a complaint when the committee wouldn't consider his amendment.

In May 2017, Eastman was involved in a controversy regarding his remarks suggesting that Alaska Native women in villages try to get pregnant on purpose to get a "free trip to the city" for abortion. He claims there are too many "incentives" to get an abortion and said, "We have folks who try to get pregnant in this state so that they can get a free trip to the city, and we have folks who want to carry their baby past the point of being able to have an abortion in this state so that they can have a free trip to Seattle." He provided no evidence for these statements, but asserted, "a number of people have come to (his) office with stories, experiences." The Alaska House of Representatives voted to censure Eastman because of his remarks. It marked the first time in Alaska history a politician had been censured.

=== Racial equity recognitions ===
In April 2017, Eastman voted against a bill to honor Hmong veterans and the more than 100,000 Hmong people who died supporting the United States in the Vietnam War.

Eastman has also voted against bills honoring black soldiers who constructed the Alaska Highway and the recognition of Black History Month.

=== Tea Party movement ===
Eastman was an activist for the Tea Party movement.

=== Lifetime membership with the Oath Keepers ===
In late September 2021, following a hack of the group's internal data, it was revealed that Eastman's name was among the some 38,000 people whose names appear on a lifetime membership roster of the Oath Keepers; a far-right militia organization. Records show that Eastman is a lifetime member of the Oath Keepers, as reported by BuzzFeed News and other organizations.

As a consequence of his membership, on January 31, 2022, five members of the seven-member Committee on Committees, two Republicans, two Democrats and an Independent, all members of the House majority coalition, voted to remove Eastman from his membership on some committees. In December 2022, following his re-election to the Alaska House, a lawsuit was filed barring Eastman from serving in the House. The suit alleged that his membership in the Oath Keepers and the group's role in the January 6 United States Capitol attack ran afoul of a disloyalty clause in the Alaskan Constitution. The initial court ruling found that Eastman was not disqualified on First Amendment grounds because he did not himself actively participate in the Oath Keepers' attempt to overthrow the U.S. government.

=== 2021 United States Capitol attack ===
Following Donald Trump's loss in the 2020 United States presidential election, Eastman posted on his website that, "The election process that has been observed thus far by the American people has been abused to such a degree that, in my view, it can no longer be called an election. To call what the American people have observed 'an election', under the United States Constitution, would be fundamentally dishonest."

Eastman traveled to Washington, D.C., on January 6, 2021, to protest the Electoral College vote count which confirmed Joe Biden's victory, and to see Trump speak at the "Stop the Steal" rally. He spoke to Alaska Public Radio as he walked from the rally to the Capitol and was photographed a few hundred feet from the Capitol building. He later described the storming of the Capitol building as "pretty terrible." The next day he promoted the false claim that the attack on the Capitol was the work of antifa.

On November 11, 2021, 69 local and other graduates of West Point wrote a letter published in Mat-Su Valley Frontiersman, Eastman's local paper, to demand that he resign from the legislature since, though he had stressed his military credentials and training at the United States Military Academy, he had dishonored the ideals of The Long Gray Line, that is, those who had matriculated at the USMA.

=== Reviewing efforts to contest 2020 presidential election results ===
In June 2021, Eastman traveled to Arizona to observe the 2021 Maricopa County presidential ballot audit ordered by the Arizona state senate.

=== Russian invasion of Ukraine ===
During the Russian invasion of Ukraine, Eastman was the sole vote in the Alaska House of Representatives against a non-binding resolution to supply military aid to Ukraine.

=== Economic benefit of abused children's death ===
In February 2023, at a meeting of the House Judiciary Committee, Eastman said "It gets argued periodically that [fatal child abuse is] actually a cost savings because that child is not going to need any of those government services that they might otherwise be entitled to receive and need based on growing up in this type of environment." His statements have been critiqued by fellow representatives and constituents as callous and hypocritical, as he is adamantly opposed to abortion. He was censured for his remarks by the Alaska State House in a vote of 35–1, with Eastman himself as the sole vote against the censure.

== Electoral history ==
=== 2024 ===
==== Primary ====
2024 Nonpartisan primary
Party	Candidate	Votes	%
Republican	David Eastman (incumbent)	1,226	61.7
Republican	Jubilee Underwood	756	38.1
Total votes		1,982	100.0

==== General ====
2024 Alaska House of Representatives election, District 27
Party	Candidate	Votes	%
Republican	Jubilee Underwood	3,856	50.6
Republican	David Eastman (incumbent)	3,660	48.1
Write-in		99	1.3
Total votes		7,615	100.0
Republican hold			
