= Dan Ortiz (politician) =

American politician

Daniel H. Ortiz
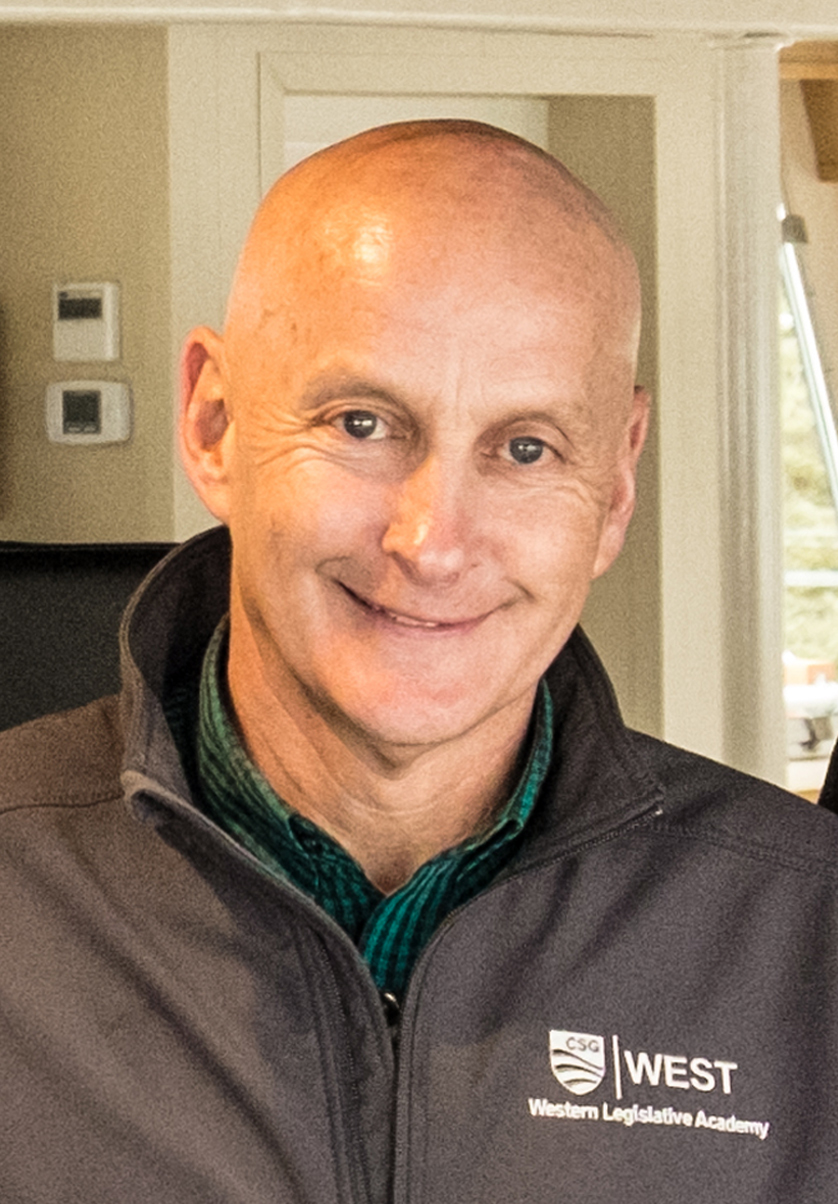

Member of the Alaska House of Representatives
- In office January 20, 2015 – January 21, 2025
- Preceded by: Peggy Wilson
- Succeeded by: Jeremy Bynum
- Constituency: 36th district (2015–2023); 1st district (2023–2025)

Personal details
- Born: Ottawa, Illinois, U.S.
- Party: Not Affiliated
- Spouse: Lori
- Children: Molly Kate, Lucy, Sam
- Education: University of Wisconsin (MST); Seattle Pacific University (BA)
- Occupation: teacher (retired)

Daniel H. Ortiz is a former nonaffiliated member of the Alaska House of Representatives, who represented the 1st District (formally 36th) from 2015 to 2025. He caucused with the Democratic-led majority for purposes of committee assignments.

Ortiz was elected in November 2014 to succeed retiring Representative Peggy Wilson of Wrangell. He defeated Wilson's endorsed candidate, Republican Chere Klein, by just 104 votes.

== Personal life ==
Dan Ortiz has a wife, Lori, and three children. He is a former schoolteacher who taught at Ketchikan High School.
