= Rebecca Schwanke =

American politician

Member of the Alaska House of Representatives from the 36th district
- Incumbent
- Assumed office January 21, 2025
- Preceded by: Mike Cronk

Personal details
- Born: Tok, Alaska, U.S.
- Party: Republican
- Education: University of Alaska Fairbanks
- Website: https://www.schwankeforstatehouse.com/

Rebecca Schwanke is an American politician and member of the Alaska House of Representatives since 2025 from the 36th district, the largest constituency in the state.

== Electoral history ==
=== 2024 ===
==== Primary ====
2024 Nonpartisan primary
Party	Candidate	Votes	%
Democratic	Brandon "Putuuqti" Kowalski	1,264	33.8
Republican	Rebecca Schwanke	768	20.5
Republican	Pamela Goode	529	14.1
Republican	Cole Snodgress (withdrew)	515	13.8
Republican	Dana Mock (withdrew)	426	11.5
Libertarian	James Fields	239	6.4
Total votes		3,741	100.0

After the primary election, Republicans Cole Snodgress and Dana Mock withdrew from the general election, allowing Libertarian James Fields to advance.

==== General ====
2024 Alaska House of Representatives General election, district 36
Party	Candidate	First choice			Round 1			Round 2			Round 3	
Party	Candidate	Votes	%	Transfer	Votes	%	Transfer	Votes	%	Transfer	Votes	%
Republican	Rebecca Schwanke	3,180	35.7%	+9	3,189	35.7%	+93	3,282	37.9%	+788	4,070	56.3%
Democratic	Brandon "Putuuqti" Kowalski	2,946	33.0%	+7	2,953	33.1%	+69	3,022	34.9%	+133	3,155	43.7%
Republican	Pamela Goode	2,276	25.5%	+15	2,291	25.7%	+71	2,362	27.3%	-2,362	Eliminated	
Libertarian	James Fields	491	5.5%	+7	498	5.6%	-498	Eliminated				
Write-in		23	0.3%	-23	Eliminated							
Total votes		8,916			8,931			8,666			7,225	
Blank or inactive ballots					451		+265	716		+1,441	2,157	
