= Ted Eischeid =

American politician

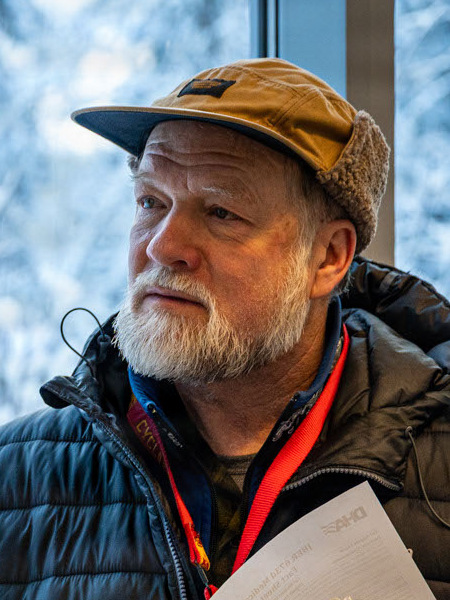
- Eischeid at Elmendorf-Richardson in 2026

Member of the Alaska House of Representatives from the 22nd district
- Incumbent
- Assumed office January 21, 2025
- Preceded by: Stanley Wright

Personal details
- Born: Dubuque, Iowa, U.S.
- Party: Democratic
- Education: Iowa State University; Mississippi State University

Ted Eischeid is an American politician. He is the member for the 22nd district of the Alaska House of Representatives.

== Life and career ==
Eischeid was born in Dubuque, Iowa. He attended Iowa State University, earning his bachelor's degree in 1984. He also attended Mississippi State University, earning his graduate degree in 2005.

== Electoral history ==
=== 2024 ===
==== Primary ====
2024 Nonpartisan primary
Party	Candidate	Votes	%
Democratic	Ted Eischeid	625	51.4
Republican	Stanley Wright (incumbent)	590	48.6
Total votes		1,215	100.0

==== General ====
2024 Alaska House of Representatives election, District 22
Party	Candidate	Votes	%
Democratic	Ted Eischeid	2,633	52.4
Republican	Stanley Wright (incumbent)	2,382	47.4
Write-in		12	0.2
Total votes		5,027	100.0
Democratic gain from Republican			
