= Genevieve Mina =

American politician (born 1996)

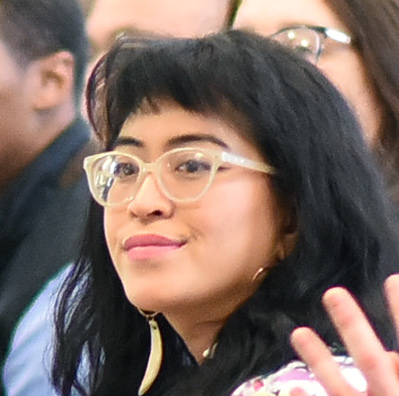
- Genevieve Mina listens while attending a legislative town hall meeting in Anchorage in March 2024.

Member of the Alaska House of Representatives from the 19th district
- Incumbent
- Assumed office January 17, 2023
- Preceded by: Geran Tarr

Personal details
- Born: 1996 (age 29–30) Anchorage, Alaska, U.S.
- Party: Democratic

Genevieve G. Mina (born 1996) is an American politician serving as a member of the Alaska House of Representatives for the 19th district. Elected in November 2022, she assumed office on January 17, 2023.

== Early life and education ==
Mina was born and raised in Alaska, the daughter of immigrants from the Philippines. She attended East Anchorage High School and studied political science and biology at the University of Alaska Anchorage. While at UAA, Mina joined Young Democrats branch of the Alaska Democratic Party, later becoming president of the university chapter, and selected as a delegate to the 2016 Democratic National Convention. Mina also joined UAA's Seawolf Debate Program, where she won the 2018 Seattle University Debate Tournament, and was selected to compete internationally at the 2019 World Universities Debating Championship (WUDC) in Cape Town, South Africa.

== Career ==
Mina began working as a legislative intern in the Alaska Legislature in 2017. She later worked in the offices of Ivy Spohnholz and Eric Croft. Mina was elected to the Alaska House of Representatives in November 2022. She is Alaska's second Filipino legislator.

== Electoral history ==
=== 2024 ===
==== Primary ====
2024 Nonpartisan primary
| Party | Candidate | Votes | % |
|---|---|---|---|
| Democratic | Genevieve Mina (incumbent) | 775 | 69.4 |
| Republican | Kaylee Anderson | 284 | 25.4 |
| Independent | Russell Wyatt | 58 | 5.2 |
| Total votes | | 1,117 | 100.0 |

==== General ====
2024 Alaska House of Representatives election, District 19
| Party | Candidate | Votes | % |
|---|---|---|---|
| Democratic | Genevieve Mina (incumbent) | 2,654 | 60.8 |
| Republican | Kaylee Anderson | 1,353 | 31.0 |
| Independent | Russell Wyatt | 338 | 7.8 |
| Write-in | | 18 | 0.4 |
| Total votes | | 4,363 | 100.0 |
| Democratic hold | | | |
