= Zack Fields =

American politician

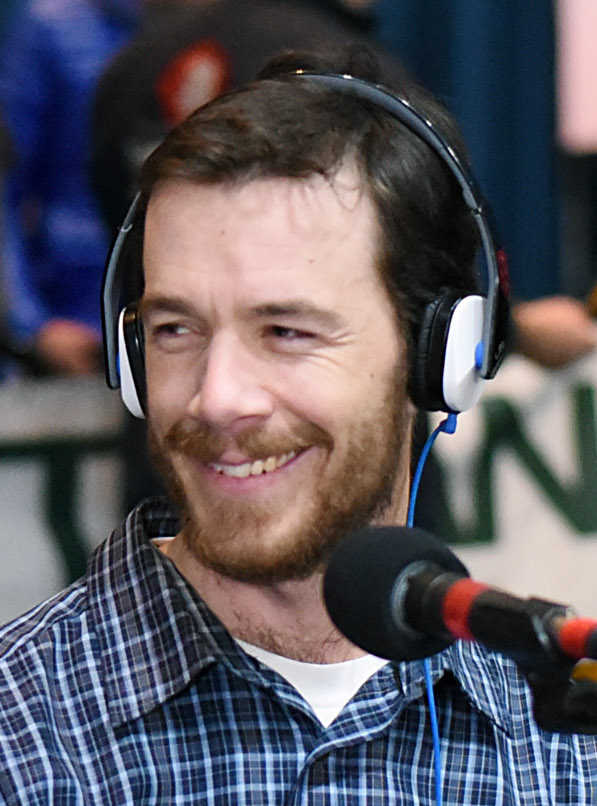
- Zack Fields in November 2018

Member of the Alaska House of Representatives
- Incumbent
- Assumed office January 15, 2019
- Preceded by: Les Gara
- Constituency: 20th district (2019–2023); 17th district (2023–present)

Personal details
- Born: July 30, 1984 (age 41) Charlottesville, Virginia, U.S.
- Party: Democratic
- Spouse: Khalial Withen

William Zachary Fields (born July 30, 1984) is an American politician serving as a Democratic member of the Alaska Legislature representing the State's 17th House district.

== Electoral history ==
Fields won the election on 6 November 2018 from the platform of Democratic Party. He secured sixty-six percent of the vote while his closest rival Republican Ceezar Martinson secured twenty-nine percent.

=== 2024 ===
==== Primary ====
2024 Nonpartisan primary
| Party | Candidate | Votes | % |
|---|---|---|---|
| Democratic | Zack Fields (incumbent) | 1,859 | 100.0 |
| Total votes | | 1,859 | 100.0 |

==== General ====
2024 Alaska House of Representatives election, District 17
| Party | Candidate | Votes | % |
|---|---|---|---|
| Democratic | Zack Fields (incumbent) | 5,243 | 93.6 |
| Write-in | | 361 | 6.4 |
| Total votes | | 5,604 | 100.0 |
| Democratic hold | | | |
