= Bill Elam =

American politician

Member of the Alaska House of Representatives from the 8th district
- Incumbent
- Assumed office January 21, 2025
- Preceded by: Ben Carpenter

Personal details
- Born: West Palm Beach, Florida, U.S.
- Party: Republican
- Spouse: Sandra Elam (Quick)
- Education: Eastern Washington University; Northwest Nazarene University
- Website: Legislature website

Bill Elam is an American information technologist and politician serving as a member of the Alaska House of Representatives for the 8th district since 2025. A Republican, he previously served two terms in the Kenai Peninsula Borough Assembly.

== Early life and education ==
Elam was born in West Palm Beach, Florida. He graduated from Eastern Washington University and Northwest Nazarene University.

== Alaska House of Representatives ==
Elam was elected to the Alaska House of Representatives for the 8th district in 2024, defeating fellow Republican John Hillyer to replace incumbent Ben Carpenter, who ran for the state senate. He was sworn in on January 21, 2025.

== Electoral history ==
=== 2024 ===
Nonpartisan primary
Party	Candidate	Votes	%
Republican	John Hillyer	1,625	50.8
Republican	Bill Elam	1,598	49.2
Total votes		3,250	100.0

General election
Party	Candidate	Votes	%
Republican	Bill Elam	4,655	51.5
Republican	John Hillyer	4,249	47.0
Write-in		130	1.4
Total votes		9,034	100.0
Republican hold			
