= Sara Hannan =

American politician (born 1961)

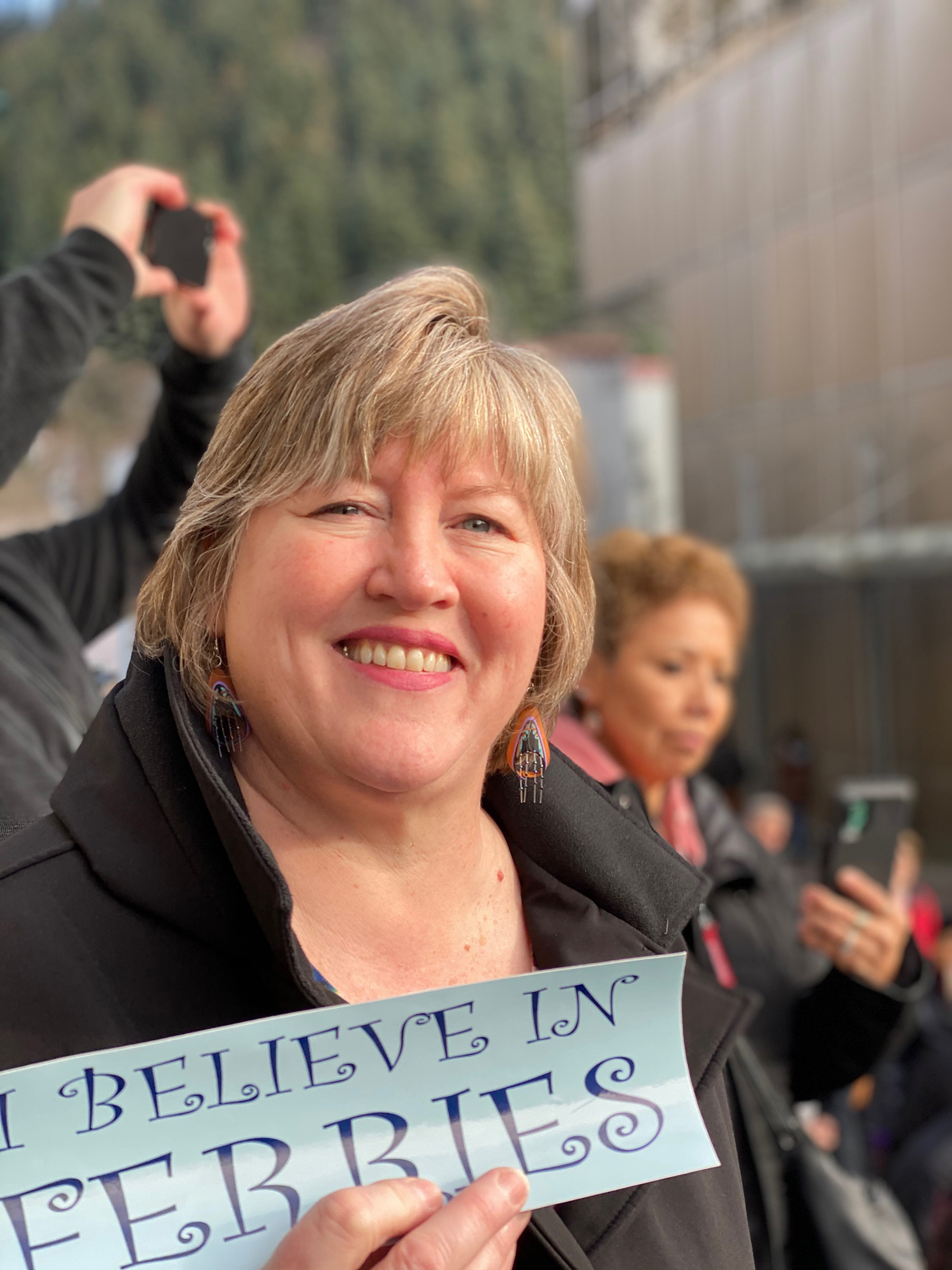
- Sara Hannan demonstrating her support for the Alaska Marine Highway System in front of the Alaska State Capitol in February 2020.

Member of the Alaska House of Representatives
- Incumbent
- Assumed office January 15, 2019
- Preceded by: Sam Kito III
- Constituency: 33rd district (2019–2023); 4th district (2023–present)

Personal details
- Born: January 3, 1961 (age 65) Richland, Washington
- Party: Democratic

Sara T. Hannan (born January 3, 1961) is a Democratic member of the Alaska Legislature representing the State's 4th House district.

== Career ==
Hannan won the November 2018 general election, securing fifty-six percent of the vote while her closest rival, Independent Chris Dimond, secured forty-four percent.

== Electoral history ==
=== 2024 ===
==== Primary ====
2024 Nonpartisan primary
Party	Candidate	Votes	%
Democratic	Sara Hannan (incumbent)	2,933	100.0
Total votes		2,933	100.0

==== General ====
2024 Alaska House of Representatives election, District 4
Party	Candidate	Votes	%
Democratic	Sara Hannan (incumbent)	7,000	96.6
Write-in		244	3.4
Total votes		7,244	100.0
Democratic hold			
