= Elexie Moore =

American politician

Member of the Alaska House of Representatives from the 28th district
- Incumbent
- Assumed office January 21, 2025
- Preceded by: Jesse Sumner

Personal details
- Born: 1986 or 1987 (age 38–39) Anchorage, Alaska, U.S.
- Party: Republican
- Spouse: Jonathan Luke Moore
- Children: 6
- Website: https://mooreforak.com/

Elexie Moore (born 1986/1987) is an American real estate agent and politician serving in the Alaska House of Representatives since 2025 from the 28th district, which includes northern and western areas of Wasilla, Alaska. A Republican, she defeated fellow Republican Steve Menard in a close election.

== Personal life ==
Moore is a lifelong resident of Alaska, currently residing in Wasilla with her husband, Jonathan, and their six children.

== Electoral history ==
=== 2024 ===
==== Primary ====
2024 Nonpartisan primary
Party	Candidate	Votes	%
Republican	Jesse Sumner (incumbent, withdrew)	727	33.0
Republican	Steve Menard	608	27.6
Republican	Elexie Moore	508	23.1
Republican	Jessica Wright	359	16.3
Total votes		2,202	100.0

After the primary election, Rep. Sumner withdrew from the race, citing family concerns.

==== General ====
General election
Party	Candidate	First choice			Round 1			Round 2	
Party	Candidate	Votes	%	Transfer	Votes	%	Transfer	Votes	%
Republican	Elexie Moore	2,911	37.3%	+18	2,929	37.9%	+314	3,243	50.1%
Republican	Steve Menard	2,777	35.6%	+10	2,787	36.0%	+444	3,231	49.9%
Republican	Jessica Wright	1,997	25.6%	+17	2,014	26.1%	-2,014	Eliminated	
Write-in		115	1.5%	-115	Eliminated				
Total votes		7,800			7,730			6,474	
Blank or inactive ballots					1,185		+1,256	2,441	
