= Carolyn Hall =

American politician

Member of the Alaska House of Representatives from the 16th district
- Incumbent
- Assumed office January 21, 2025
- Preceded by: Jennie Armstrong

Personal details
- Born: Whitman, Massachusetts
- Party: Democratic
- Spouse: Scott Jensen
- Education: Franklin Pierce University (BA); University of Alaska Anchorage (MPA)

Carolyn Hall-Jensen is an American communications professional and politician who is a member of the Alaska House of Representatives for the 16th district.

== Early life and career ==
Hall was born in Whitman, Massachusetts and moved to Alaska in 2008. She graduated with a Bachelor of Arts in mass communications from Franklin Pierce University in 2003 and worked for the Boston Red Sox as a video producer. She earned a Masters in Public Administration from the University of Alaska Anchorage in 2020.

She worked as the spokesperson for Mayor of Anchorage Ethan Berkowitz and at KTUU-TV.

== Alaska House of Representatives ==
Following incumbent Jennie Armstrong's announcement that she would not seek re-election, Hall filed to run for the Alaska House of Representatives in the 16th district in 2024. She faced Independent Nick Moe in the primary and the two advanced to the general election, but Moe later withdrew and endorsed Hall. Due to paperwork error, Moe failed to meet the withdrawal deadline so his name remained on the ballot. She won the general election.

During her first session, Hall served on nine committees including public safety and resources and co-chaired the labor and commerce committee. She named reforming the state retirement system, updating the unemployment insurance program, and expanding paid parental leave as priorities.

== Electoral history ==
=== 2024 ===
==== Primary ====
Nonpartisan primary
Party	Candidate	Votes	%
Democratic	Carolyn Hall	2,023	62.5
Independent	Nick Moe (withdrawn)	1,214	37.5
Total votes		3,237	100.0

After the primary election, Independent Nick Moe withdrew his candidacy and endorsed Hall, leaving Hall unopposed. Moe remained on the ballot.

==== General ====
2024 Alaska House of Representatives election, District 16
Party	Candidate	Votes	%
Democratic	Carolyn Hall	4,860	56.6
Independent	Nick Moe (withdrawn)	3,649	42.5
Write-in		83	1.0
Total votes		8,592	100.0
Democratic hold			
