= Neal Foster =

American politician (born 1972)

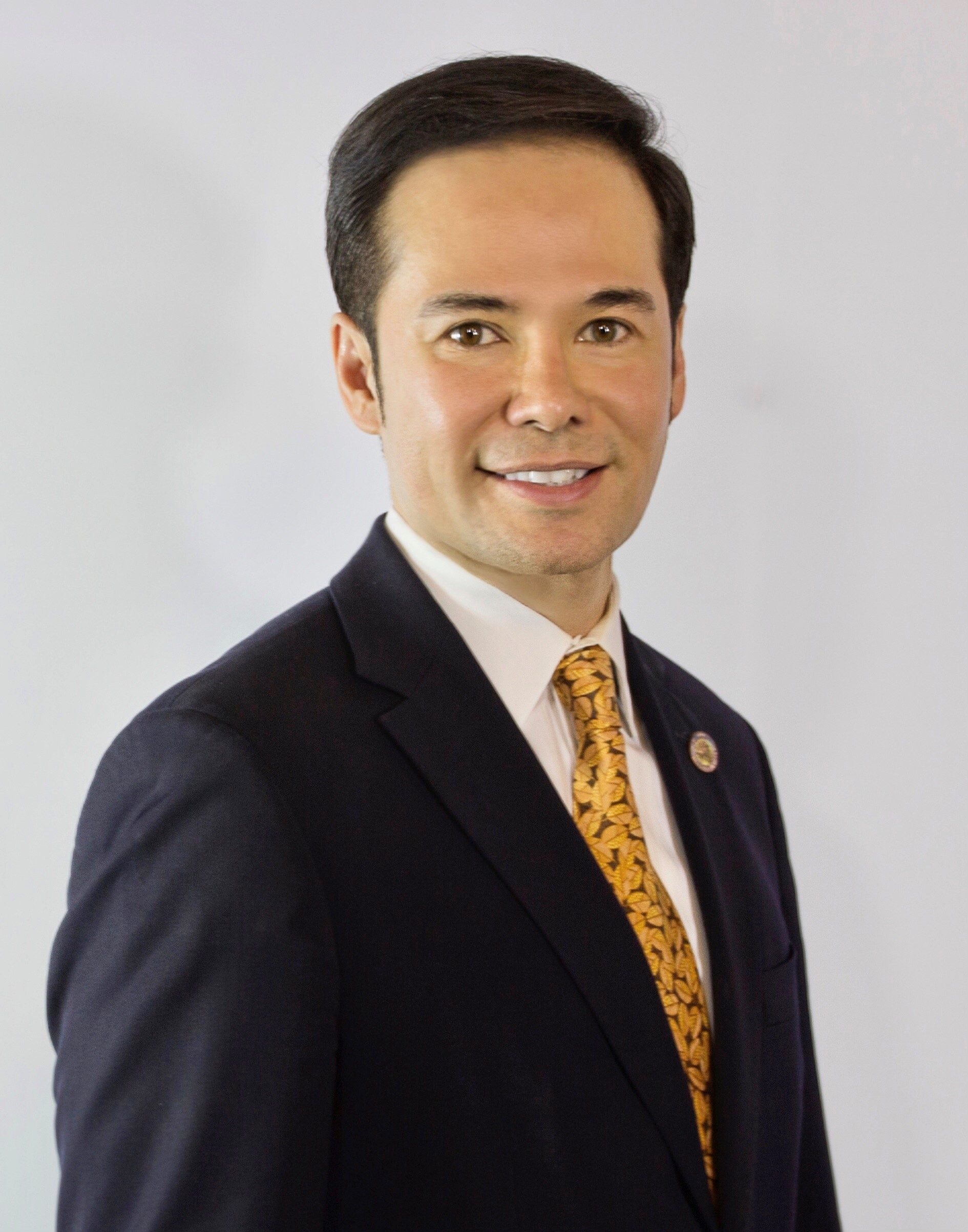

Speaker Pro Tempore and Acting Speaker of the Alaska House of Representatives
- In office January 17, 2019 – February 14, 2019
- Preceded by: Bryce Edgmon
- Succeeded by: Bryce Edgmon

Member of the Alaska House of Representatives from the 39th district
- Incumbent
- Assumed office November 15, 2009
- Preceded by: Richard Foster

Personal details
- Born: May 29, 1972 (age 54) Nome, Alaska, U.S.
- Party: Democratic
- Relatives: Richard Foster (father)
- Education: Stanford University (BA); University of Alaska, Anchorage (BBA)

Neal Winston Foster (born May 29, 1972) is a member of the Alaska House of Representatives, representing the 39th District, which is centered on Nome, Alaska. He has served in the House since November 15, 2009. He was appointed to the House to replace his father, Richard Foster, who had died in office the previous month. In the 27th Alaska State Legislature, Foster joined along with the other three Democrats from Western Alaska, Bryce Edgmon, Bob Herron and Reggie Joule, as members in the Republican-led majority caucus in the House. Neal Foster is longest serving Chairman of the House Finance Committee with 10 years. At the end of his next term he will have 12 years in the position.

Neal Foster, as was Cathy Muñoz, is a third-generation member of the Alaska Legislature. Foster's grandfather, also named Neal W. Foster (1916–1979) and nicknamed "Willie," served one term in the Territorial legislature during the 1950s and in the State Senate in the 1960s.

== Electoral history ==
=== 2024 ===
==== Primary ====
2024 Nonpartisan primary
Party	Candidate	Votes	%
Democratic	Neal Foster (incumbent)	1,057	64.3
Independence	Tyler Ivanoff	587	35.7
Total votes		1,644	100.0

==== General ====
2024 Alaska House of Representatives election, District 39
Party	Candidate	Votes	%
Democratic	Neal Foster (incumbent)	2,333	58.1
Independence	Tyler Ivanoff	1,670	41.6
Write-in		11	0.3
Total votes		4,014	100.0
Democratic hold			

== See also ==
- List of Native American politicians

Political offices
Preceded by Bryce Edgmon	Speaker of the Alaska House of Representatives; Acting; 2019	Succeeded by Bryce Edgmon
