= Jennifer Armstrong (politician) =

American politician

Member of the Alaska House of Representatives from the 16th district
- In office January 17, 2023 – January 21, 2025
- Preceded by: Ivy Spohnholz
- Succeeded by: Carolyn Hall

Personal details
- Born: c. 1988 New Orleans, Louisiana
- Party: Democratic
- Spouse: Ben Kellie
- Occupation: Marketing consultant

Jennifer Armstrong (born c. 1989) is an American politician. A member of the Democratic Party, she has served in the Alaska House of Representatives since 2023, representing the 16th district.

== Life and career ==
Armstrong was a businessperson.

In August 2022, Armstrong defeated Joel McKinney and Richard Beckes in the non-partisan primary election for the 16th district of the Alaska House of Representatives. In November 2022, she defeated Liz Vazquez in the general election, winning 55 percent of the votes. She succeeded Ivy Spohnholz. She assumed office on January 17, 2023. Armstrong is the first openly pansexual member of the Alaska Legislature.
