= Jeremy Bynum =

American politician

Member of the Alaska House of Representatives from the 1st district
- Incumbent
- Assumed office January 21, 2025
- Preceded by: Dan Ortiz

Personal details
- Born: Portland, Oregon, U.S.
- Party: Republican
- Spouse: Carolyn Henry
- Education: Portland State University (BS)

Military service
- Allegiance: United States
- Branch/service: United States Air Force
- Years of service: 1995–2000; 2001-2003 (Air National Guard)

Jeremy T. Bynum is an American engineer and politician who is a member of the Alaska House of Representatives for the 1st district. He previously served in the United States Air Force and as a member of the Ketchikan Gateway Borough Assembly from 2020 to 2024.

== Early life and education ==
Bynum was born in Portland, Oregon, and graduated from Portland State University with a Bachelor of Science in engineering.

== Career ==
Bynum served in the United States Air Force from 1995 to 2000 as a power generation specialist. He served in the Air National Guard from 2001 to 2003.

Bynum worked as the electric manager of Ketchikan Public Utilities. He was elected to the Ketchikan Gateway Borough Assembly in 2020.

== Alaska House of Representatives ==
Bynum first ran for the Alaska House of Representatives in 2022, facing incumbent Independent Dan Ortiz. His campaign raised $22,000, with the vast majority of funds coming from Bynum and his wife. He lost in the general election with about 47% of the vote.

After Ortiz announced he would not run for re-election in 2024, Bynum ran for the seat and won with 52% of the vote, defeating Independent candidates Grant EchoHawk and Agnes Moran.

Bynum was assigned to serve as a member of the House Finance Committee when the legislature convened on January 21, 2025.

=== Electoral history ===
==== 2022 ====
Nonpartisan primary
Party	Candidate	Votes	%
Independent	Dan Ortiz (incumbent)	2,174	52.4
Republican	Jeremy Bynum	1,812	43.7
Independent	Shevaun Meggitt (withdrew)	162	3.9
Total votes		4,148	100.0

2022 Alaska House of Representatives election, District 1
Party	Candidate	Votes	%
Independent	Dan Ortiz (incumbent)	3,513	52.4
Republican	Jeremy Bynum	3,170	47.3
Write-in	Write-ins	16	0.2
Total votes		6,699	100.0
Independent hold			
Coalition hold			

==== 2024 ====
Nonpartisan primary
Party	Candidate	Votes	%
Republican	Jeremy Bynum	1,437	49.0
Independent	Grant Echohawk	790	26.9
Independent	Agnes Moran	707	24.1
Total votes		2,934	100.0

2024 Alaska House of Representatives election, District 1
Party	Candidate	Votes	%
Republican	Jeremy Bynum	4,242	52.0
Independent	Agnes Moran	1,995	24.4
Independent	Grant Echohawk	1,909	23.4
Write-in		17	0.2
Total votes		8,164	100.0
Republican gain from Independent			

== Personal life ==
Bynum has lived in Ketchikan, Alaska, with his wife, Carolyn Henry, since 2016.
