= Jubilee Underwood =

American politician

Member of the Alaska House of Representatives from the 27th district
- Incumbent
- Assumed office January 21, 2025
- Preceded by: David Eastman

Personal details
- Born: Wasilla, Alaska, U.S.
- Party: Republican

Jubilee Underwood is an American politician elected in 2024 to serve in the Alaska House of Representatives to represent district 27. She is a Republican.

== Electoral history ==
=== 2024 ===
==== Primary ====
2024 Nonpartisan primary
Party	Candidate	Votes	%
Republican	David Eastman (incumbent)	1,226	61.7
Republican	Jubilee Underwood	756	38.1
Total votes		1,982	100.0

==== General ====
2024 Alaska House of Representatives election, District 27
Party	Candidate	Votes	%
Republican	Jubilee Underwood	3,856	50.6
Republican	David Eastman (incumbent)	3,660	48.1
Write-in		99	1.3
Total votes		7,615	100.0
Republican hold			
