= Mike Prax =

American politician

Member of the Alaska House of Representatives
- Incumbent
- Assumed office February 24, 2020
- Preceded by: Tammie Wilson
- Constituency: 3rd district (2020–2023); 33rd district (2023–present)

Fairbanks North Star Borough Assembly, Seat G
- In office 1997–2000

Personal details
- Born: May 25, 1956 (age 70) Fairfax, Minnesota, U.S.
- Party: Republican
- Spouse: Elaine
- Children: 2

Glenn "Mike" Prax (born May 25, 1956) is an American politician. He is a Republican representing District 33 in the Alaska House of Representatives.

== Political career ==
Prax held Seat G on the Fairbanks North Star Borough Assembly from 1997 to 2000.

In January 2020, former Alaska House member Tammie Wilson resigned to work for the state Office of Children's Services. Alaska Governor Mike Dunleavy appointed Prax to fill the seat on February 18, and he was sworn in on February 24.

As of June 2020, Prax sits on the House Education and Energy committees.

== Electoral history ==
=== 2024 ===
==== Primary ====
2024 Nonpartisan primary
Party	Candidate	Votes	%
Republican	Mike Prax (incumbent)	1,737	100.0
Total votes		1,737	100.0

==== General ====
2024 Alaska House of Representatives election, District 33
Party	Candidate	Votes	%
Republican	Mike Prax (incumbent)	6,966	96.8
Write-in		234	3.2
Total votes		7,200	100.0
Republican hold			
