= Andrew Gray (politician) =

American politician

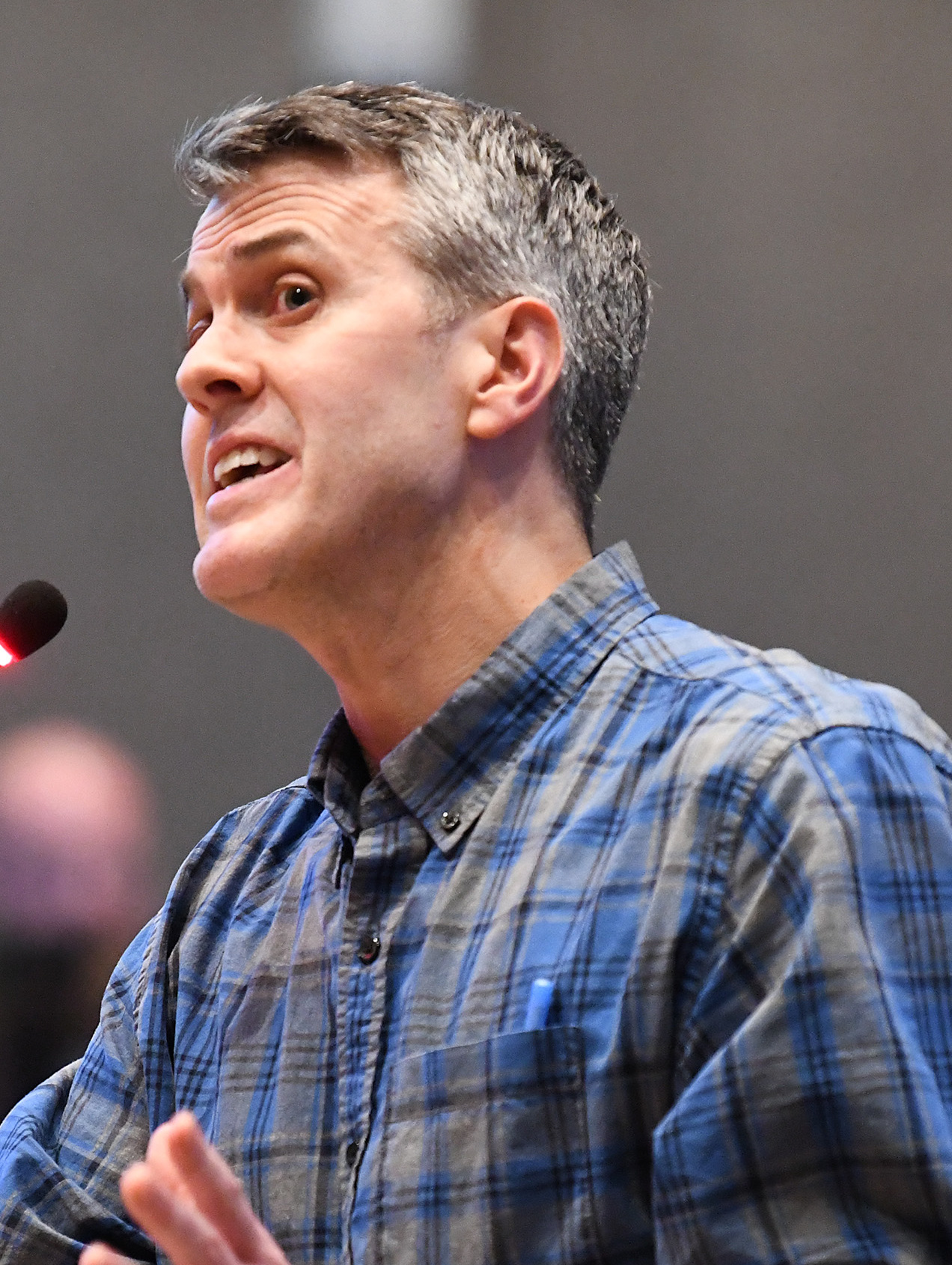
- Gray testifying before the Anchorage Assembly in October 2021

Member of the Alaska House of Representatives from the 20th district
- Incumbent
- Assumed office January 17, 2023
- Preceded by: Ivy Spohnholz

Personal details
- Born: Andrew Timothy Gray; February 16, 1975 (age 51) Pasadena, Texas
- Party: Democratic
- Education: University of Texas at Austin; Baylor College of Medicine
- Occupation: Physician assistant

Andrew Timothy Gray (born 1975) is an American politician. He serves as a Democratic member for the 20th district of the Alaska House of Representatives.

== Life and career ==
Gray served as a physician assistant in the Army National Guard from 2014 to 2023. He deployed to Kosovo in 2019 with the Alaska Army National Guard’s 1-297th Infantry Battalion, where he was awarded the meritorious service medal.

In 2022, Gray defeated Scott Kohlhaas, Jordan Harary and Paul Bauer in the general election for the 20th district of the Alaska House of Representatives, winning 54 percent of the votes. He succeeded Ivy Spohnholz. He is the first openly gay man elected to the Alaska Legislature. He assumed office in 2023, and was re-elected in 2024. Gray serves as a member of the House Majority Coalition, Chair of House Judiciary Committee, Co-Chair of the House Joint Armed Services Committee, and as a member of House Health & Social Services Committee, and House Military & Veterans' Affairs Committee.

Since 2021, Gray hosts a weekly interview podcast called East Anchorage Book Club, which tells the stories of Alaskans of interest and importance.

== Electoral history ==
=== 2024 ===
==== Primary ====
2024 Nonpartisan primary
Party	Candidate	Votes	%
Democratic	Andrew Gray (incumbent)	1,122	67.5
Libertarian	Scott Kohlhaas	540	32.5
Total votes		1,662	100.0

==== General ====
2024 Alaska House of Representatives election, District 20
Party	Candidate	Votes	%
Democratic	Andrew Gray (incumbent)	3,927	63.8
Libertarian	Scott Kohlhaas	2,163	35.1
Write-in		67	1.1
Total votes		6,157	100.0
Democratic hold			
