= Ashley Carrick =

American politician

Member of the Alaska House of Representatives from the 35th district
- Incumbent
- Assumed office January 17, 2023

Personal details
- Party: Democratic
- Education: University of Alaska Fairbanks; University of Alaska Anchorage

Ashley Carrick is an American politician. She serves as a Democratic member for the 35th district of the Alaska House of Representatives.

== Life and career ==
A native of Anchorage, Alaska, Carrick earned her bachelor's degree in psychology from the University of Alaska Fairbanks. She later earned her master's degree in public health from the University of Alaska Anchorage in 2020.

Carrick worked as an educator and as a legislative aide before joining the Alaska legislature. She is the first openly bisexual member of the Alaska Legislature, and one of its first openly LGBTQ members. She assumed office in 2023.

== Electoral history ==
=== 2024 ===
==== Primary ====
2024 Nonpartisan primary
Party	Candidate	Votes	%
Democratic	Ashley Carrick (incumbent)	2,332	60.6
Republican	Ruben McNeill	1,517	39.4
Total votes		3,849	100.0

==== General ====
2024 Alaska House of Representatives election, District 35
Party	Candidate	Votes	%
Democratic	Ashley Carrick (incumbent)	5,047	55.2
Republican	Ruben McNeill	4,066	44.5
Write-in		23	0.2
Total votes		9,136	100.0
Democratic hold			
