= Will Stapp =

American politician (born 1987)

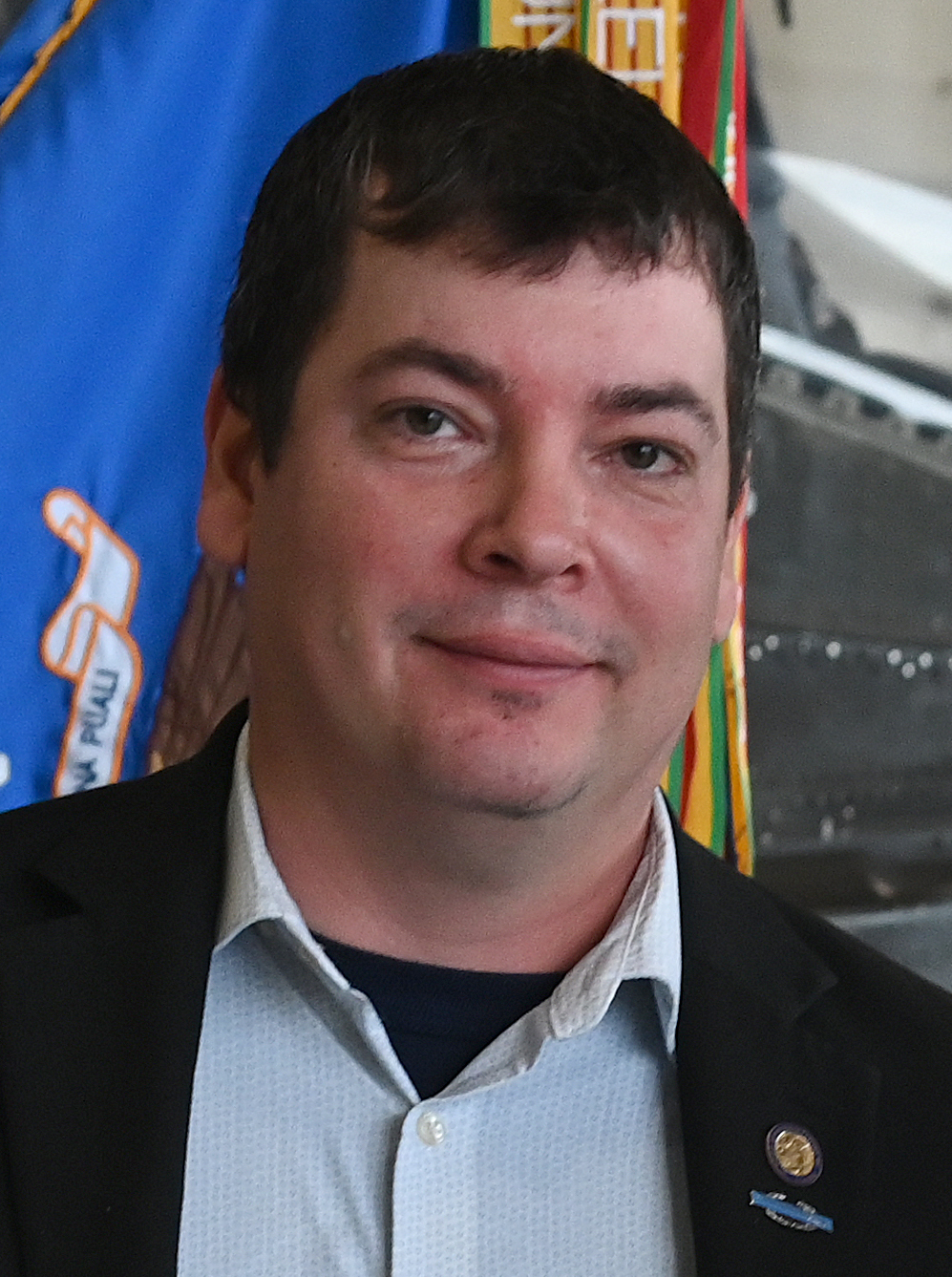

Member of the Alaska House of Representatives
- Incumbent
- Assumed office January 17, 2023
- Preceded by: Steve Thompson (redistricting)
- Constituency: 32nd district

Personal details
- Born: William Brandon Stapp; 1987 (age 38–39) Seattle, Washington, U.S.
- Party: Republican
- Occupation: Insurance agent

William Brandon Stapp (born 1987) is an American politician from Alaska serving as a member of the Alaska House of Representatives since 2023 representing District 32, which covers east Fairbanks.

Stapp is a native of Kirkland, Washington. He arrived in Alaska when he was in the United States Army where he served in Iraq in 2009.

== Electoral history ==
=== 2024 ===
==== Primary ====
2024 Nonpartisan primary
Party	Candidate	Votes	%
Republican	Will Stapp (incumbent)	821	66.1
Democratic	Gary Damron	421	33.9
Total votes		1,242	100.0

==== General ====
2024 Alaska House of Representatives election, District 32
Party	Candidate	Votes	%
Republican	Will Stapp (incumbent)	3,227	67.3
Democratic	Gary Damron	1,548	32.3
Write-in		21	0.4
Total votes		4,796	100.0
Republican hold			
