= Julie Coulombe =

American politician

- Coulombe in 2023

Member of the Alaska House of Representatives
- Incumbent
- Assumed office January 17, 2023
- Preceded by: DeLena Johnson (redistricting)
- Constituency: 11th district

Personal details
- Born: ca. 1966 (age 59–60) Arlington Heights, Illinois, U.S.
- Party: Republican
- Occupation: Sales manager

Julie Coulombe is an American politician from Alaska serving as a member of the Alaska House of Representatives since 2023.

== Electoral history ==
=== 2024 ===
==== Primary ====
2024 Nonpartisan primary
Party	Candidate	Votes	%
Republican	Julie Coulombe (incumbent)	1,549	53.0
Independent	Walter Featherly	1,376	47.0
Total votes		2,925	100.0

==== General ====
2024 Alaska House of Representatives election, District 11
Party	Candidate	Votes	%
Republican	Julie Coulombe (incumbent)	4,836	52.6
Independent	Walter Featherly	4,341	47.2
Write-in		17	0.2
Total votes		9,194	100.0
Republican hold			
