= Donna Mears =

American politician

- Mears in 2026

Member of the Alaska House of Representatives
- Incumbent
- Assumed office January 17, 2023
- Preceded by: Matt Claman
- Constituency: 21st district

Personal details
- Born: c. 1971 (age 54–55) New Jersey
- Party: Alaska Democratic Party
- Education: Rutgers University; University of Michigan
- Occupation: Environmental engineer

Donna C. Mears (born c. 1971) is an American politician from Alaska who has served as a member of the Alaska House of Representatives since 2023. She represents District 21 which covers East Anchorage. Mears is a civil and environmental engineer by profession.

== Electoral history ==
=== 2024 ===
==== Primary ====
2024 Nonpartisan primary
Party	Candidate	Votes	%
Democratic	Donna Mears (incumbent)	1,402	56.8
Republican	Aimée Sims	1,067	43.2
Total votes		2,469	100.0

==== General ====
2024 Alaska House of Representatives election, District 21
Party	Candidate	Votes	%
Democratic	Donna Mears (incumbent)	4,664	55.4
Republican	Aimée Sims	3,743	44.4
Write-in		20	0.2
Total votes		8,427	100.0
Democratic hold			
