= Jamie Allard =

American politician (born 1971)

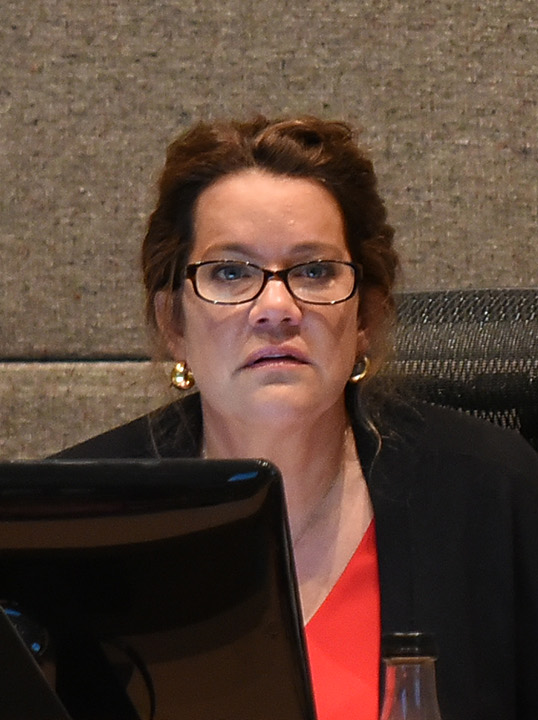

Member of the Alaska House of Representatives
- Incumbent
- Assumed office January 17, 2023
- Preceded by: Chris Tuck (redistricting)
- Constituency: 23rd district

Member of the Anchorage Assembly from Seat C
- In office April 2020 – January 17, 2023
- Preceded by: Fred Dyson
- Succeeded by: Robin Dern

Personal details
- Born: 1971 (age 54–55)
- Party: Republican

Jamie del Fierro Allard (born 1971) is an American politician from Alaska serving as a member of the Alaska House of Representatives since 2023 representing District 23 which covers an area East of Anchorage. Allard is a U.S. Army veteran and was a member of the Anchorage Assembly.

== Personal life ==
Allard has Chilean ancestry. Her father, Jose del Fierro, was a resident of Santiago who emigrated to the United States in 1958. Her mother is an Italian immigrant.

== Political career ==
Municipality of Anchorage

Her opposition to COVID-19 measures such as mask and vaccine mandates further polarized public opinion. However, her views were accepted by her conservatives across the state of Alaska and she had statewide support, including the sitting Republican Governor Michael Dunleavy. These actions led to a recall effort by Anchorage residents in 2021, She received 254 signatures out of 45,362 potential voters. The recall did not gather enough signatures to move forward.

== Electoral history ==
=== 2024 ===
==== Primary ====
2024 Nonpartisan primary
Party	Candidate	Votes	%
Republican	Jamie Allard (incumbent)	2,008	58.6
Democratic	Jim Arlington	1,417	41.4
Total votes		3,425	100.0

==== General ====
2024 Alaska House of Representatives election, District 23
Party	Candidate	Votes	%
Republican	Jamie Allard (incumbent)	6,132	61.8
Democratic	Jim Arlington	3,747	37.8
Write-in		37	0.4
Total votes		9,916	100.0
Republican hold			
