= Alaska State Legislature =

Legislative branch of the state government of Alaska

Coordinates: 58.3022°N 134.4105°W

- 34th Alaska State Legislature

Type
- Type: Bicameral
- Houses: Senate; House of Representatives
- Term limits: None

History
- New session started: January 21, 2025

Leadership
- Senate President: Gary Stevens (R-C) since January 21, 2025
- House Speaker: Bryce Edgmon (I-C) since January 21, 2025

Structure
- Seats: 20 senators; 40 representatives
- Senate political groups: Majority coalition caucus (14): Democratic (9); Republican (5); Minority caucus (6): Republican (6)
- House of Representatives political groups: Majority coalition caucus (21): Democratic (14); Independent (5); Republican (2); Minority caucus (19): Republican (19)
- Authority: Article 2, Alaska Constitution
- Salary: $84,000/year + per diem

Elections
- Last Senate election: November 5, 2024 (10 seats)
- Last House of Representatives election: November 5, 2024
- Next Senate election: November 3, 2026 (10 seats)
- Next House of Representatives election: November 3, 2026
- Redistricting: Alaska Redistricting Board

Meeting place
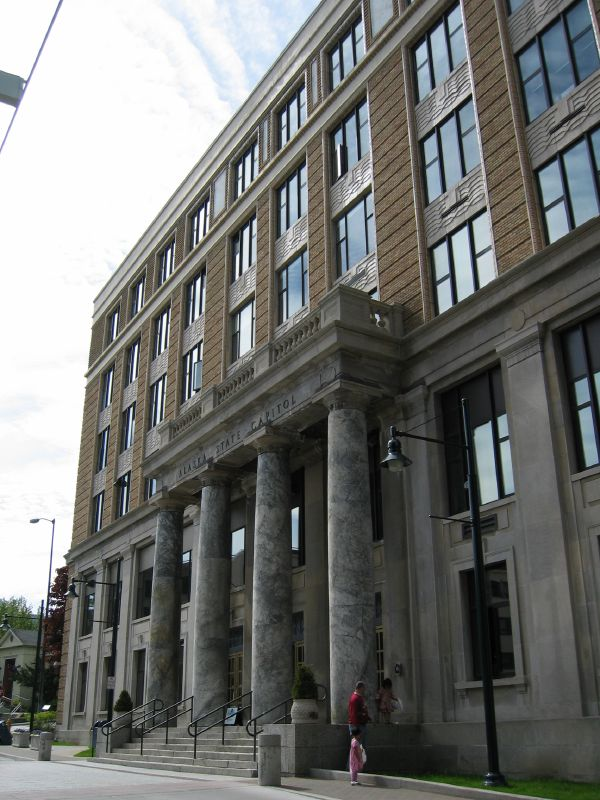
- Alaska State Capitol; Juneau

Website
- akleg.gov

Constitution
- Constitution of Alaska

The Alaska State Legislature is the state legislature of the U.S. state of Alaska. It is a bicameral institution consisting of the 40-member Alaska House of Representatives (lower house) and the 20-member Alaska Senate (upper house). There are 40 House Districts (1–40) and 20 Senate Districts (A–T). With a total of 60 lawmakers, the Alaska State Legislature is the smallest bicameral state legislature in the United States and the second-smallest of all state legislatures (only the 49-member unicameral Nebraska Legislature is smaller). State representatives are elected by ranked-choice voting. There are no term limits for either chamber. The Alaska State Legislature meets in the Alaska State Capitol in Juneau. The current meeting, since January 21, 2025 is the 34th Alaska State Legislature. The previous meeting, 33rd Alaska State Legislature, met from 2023 to 2025. Before that, the 32nd Alaska State Legislature, met from 2021 to 2023.

== Organization ==
=== Non-professional legislature ===
Unlike other state legislatures with longer sessions, the Alaska State Legislature's comparatively short session allows many lawmakers to retain outside employment, especially in the state's many seasonal industries, such as fishing and tourism. In this, the Alaska State Legislature retains some of the volunteer nature that characterized most state legislatures until the middle of the 20th century. This has led to recurring but minor controversy around the potential for conflict of interest inherent in legislators' outside employment.

=== Terms and qualifications ===
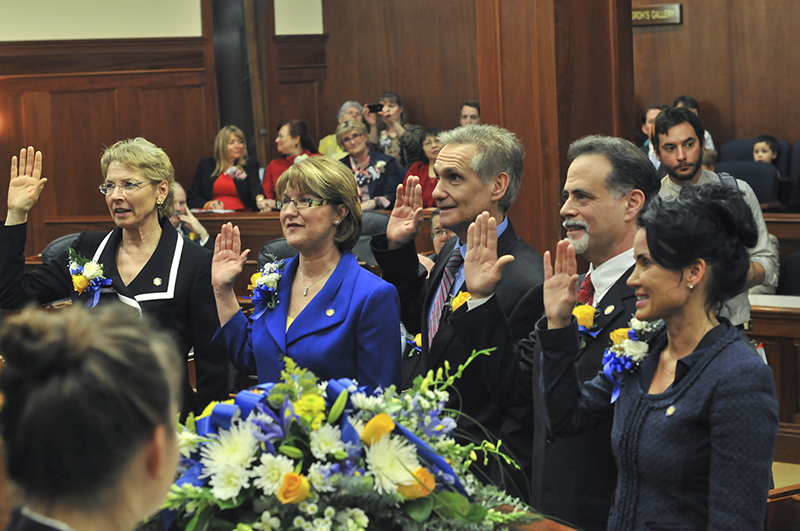
The swearing-in ceremony for the 28th Alaska State Legislature.

A candidate for legislative office must be a qualified voter and resident of Alaska for no less than three years, and a resident of the district from which elected for one year immediately preceding filing for office. A senator must be at least 25 years of age and a representative 21 years of age at the time the oath of office is taken.

Each chamber of the legislature may expel a member with the concurrence of two-thirds of the membership of that house. This has happened only once in the legislature's history. On February 5, 1982, the Alaska Senate of the 12th Legislature expelled Bethel senator George Hohman from the body. Hohman was convicted of bribery in conjunction with his legislative duties on December 24, 1981, and had defiantly refused to resign from his seat. Expulsion was unnecessary during the more recent Alaska political corruption probe, as legislators targeted by the probe resigned, lost renomination or re-election, or did not seek re-election.

The Alaska Constitution gives the legislature the authority to set the term start date. Legislative terms begin on the second Monday in January following a presidential election year and on the third Tuesday in January following a gubernatorial election. Representatives have a two-year term, and senators have a four-year term. One-half of the senators shall be elected every two years.

=== Meetings ===
Annual sessions begin in January and are limited by statute to 90 calendar days. Special sessions of 30 calendar days may be convened by a consensus of two-thirds of each house.

In the 2006 elections, a voter initiative was passed that reduced the statutory length of the session from 121 days to 90 days. The 2008 session was the first 90-day session. Although the session adjourned on time, opponents of the shorter session claimed that legislation was rushed and public input was jeopardized.

== Legislative process ==
=== Introduction ===
Legislators introduce a bill by giving it to the Chief Clerk of the Alaska House of Representatives or the Secretary of the Alaska Senate. Bills submitted by the governor are introduced through a Rules Committee in either chamber. The chief clerk of the house or the senate secretary assigns each bill a number.

During session, a bill is introduced and first read by number, sponsor or sponsors, and title. The bill is then referred to a committee or multiple committees. Both chambers have the following committees: Finance; Health, Education and Social Services; Judiciary; Labor and Commerce; Community and Regional Affairs; Resources; Rules; State Affairs and Transportation; and any subcommittees created by committee chairs.

=== Committee work ===
Committee chairs can choose whether or not to hear a bill, and committees can vote to approve a bill in its original form or make modifications through a committee substitute. Once bills or substitutes are approved, the legislation is referred to the next committee of assignment or to the Rules Committee, which can further amend the bill or assign it to the chamber's daily calendar.

=== Floor action ===
Once the Rules Committee has scheduled a bill on the chamber floor, it appears on the calendar in Second Reading. The bill is again read by number, sponsor or sponsors, and title, along with the standing committee reports. A motion is made on the floor to adopt any committee substitutes. Amendments can also be offered and voted on. Third Reading is where the motion is made to vote on the bill.

=== Opposite chamber ===
After final passage in either the Alaska House of Representatives or Alaska Senate, a bill is engrossed and sent to the opposite house to go through the same process of introduction, committee referral, and three readings.

=== Enactment ===
When a bill is not modified in the second house, that house can send it to the governor on Third Reading, through enrollment. If the bill is modified, the house of origin must vote to accept or reject amendments by the opposite house. A Fourth Reading, in the case of acceptance, will send the bill to the governor, through enrollment. If amendments are rejected, the bill can be sent to conference, where members of the Senate and House hash out a final version and send it to a Fourth Reading in both houses.

The governor can choose to sign or veto the legislation. In the case of the veto, a two-thirds majority can override the veto. If signed or approved by a veto override, the legislation becomes law. Unlike in many states, the governor does not have the power of the pocket veto.

== Caucuses ==
Unlike many other state legislative chambers in the United States, both houses of the Alaska State Legislature have a longstanding tradition of majority caucuses encompassing members of both major parties (Republican and Democratic). Democrats caucusing with the majority are colloquially known as "Bush Democrats," a reference to the Alaskan bush country from which they typically hail. Members of the minority party caucusing with the majority are treated as members of the majority for purposes of committee assignments and caucus meetings.

== See also ==
- Impeachment in Alaska
- Alaska political corruption probe
- Alaska State Capitol
- List of Alaska State Legislatures
- Statewide Suicide Prevention Council
- Political party strength in Alaska
