= Alaska House of Representatives =

Lower house in the Alaska Legislature

Coordinates: 58.302198°N 134.410467°W

- Alaska State Legislature

Type
- Type: Lower house
- Term limits: None

History
- New session started: January 21, 2025

Leadership
- Speaker: Bryce Edgmon (I-C) since January 21, 2025
- Majority Leader: Chuck Kopp (R-C) since January 21, 2025
- Minority Leader: DeLena Johnson (R) since November 29, 2025

Structure
- Seats: 40
- Political groups: Majority coalition caucus (21): Democratic (14); Independent (5); Republican (2); Minority (19): Republican (19)
- Length of term: 2 years
- Authority: Article 2, Alaska Constitution
- Salary: $50,400/year + per diem

Elections
- Voting system: Nonpartisan blanket primary / Instant-runoff voting
- Last election: November 3, 2026
- Next election: November 7, 2028
- Redistricting: Alaska Redistricting Board

Meeting place
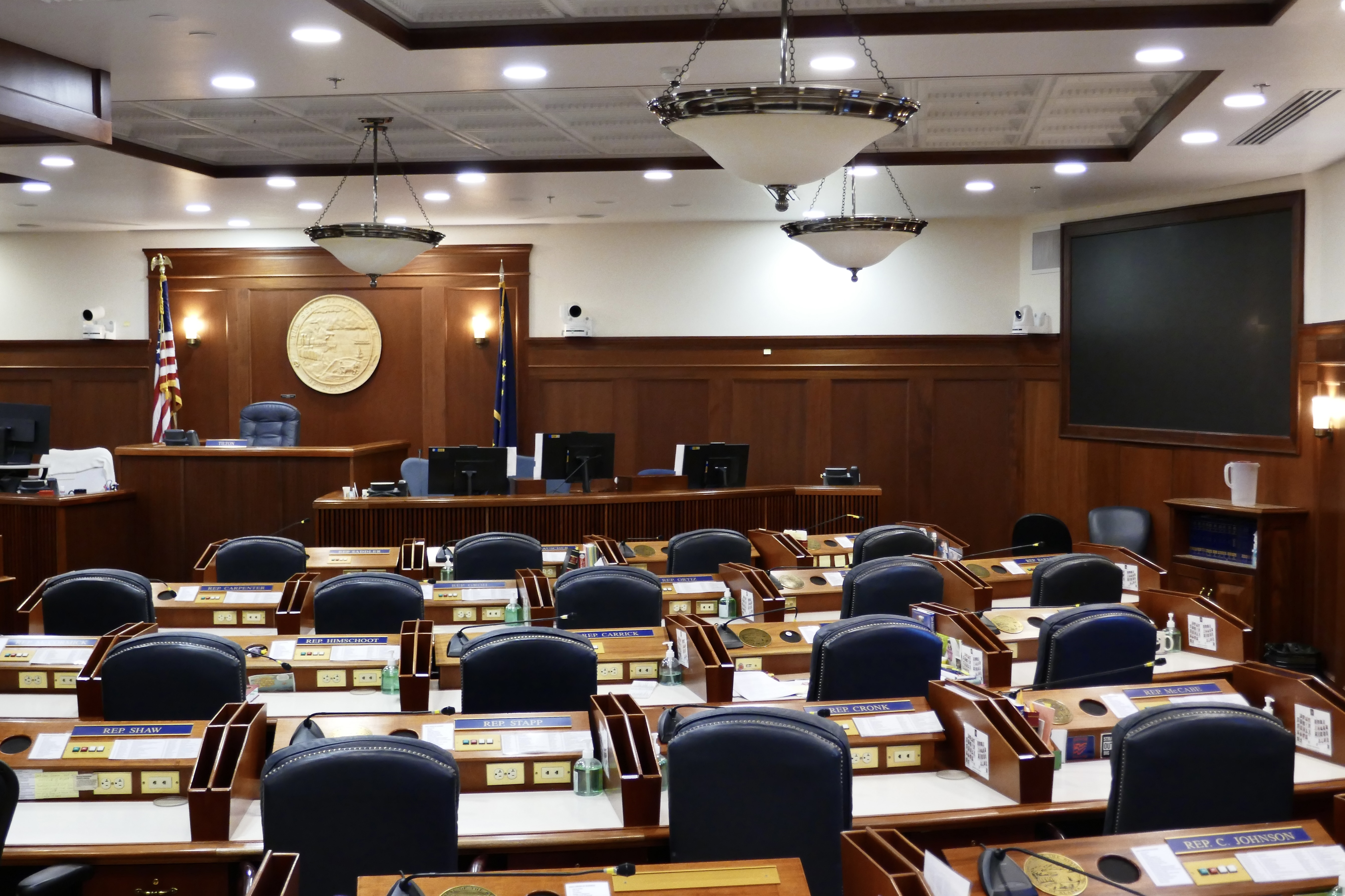
- House of Representatives chamber Alaska State Capitol; Juneau, Alaska

Website
- Alaska House of Representatives

Rules
- Alaska State Legislature Uniform Rules

The Alaska House of Representatives is the lower house in the Alaska State Legislature, the state legislature of the U.S. state of Alaska. The House is composed of 40 members, each of whom represents a district of approximately 17,756 people per 2010 census figures. Members serve two-year terms without term limits. With 40 representatives, the Alaska House is the smallest state legislative lower chamber in the United States. The House convenes at the State Capitol in Juneau.

== Powers and process ==
Members of the Alaska House of Representatives are responsible for a portion of the process of making and amending state law. The first step of the legislative process is filing a bill by giving it to the chief clerk of the Alaska House of Representatives. The chief clerk will then assign bills a number.

Bills are introduced and read the first time with the number, sponsor or sponsors, and the title of the bill and then referred to a committee(s). Committee chairs can choose whether or not hear a bill and committees can vote to approve a bill in its original form or make modifications through a committee substitute. Once bills or substitutes are approved, the legislation is referred to the next committee of assignment or to the Rules Committee, which can further amend the bill or assign it to the daily floor calendar.

Once a bill is scheduled on the floor, it appears on the calendar in Second Reading. The bill is again read by number, sponsor or sponsors, and title along with the standing committee reports. A motion is made on the floor to adopt any committee substitutes. Amendments can also be offered and voted on. Third Reading is where the motion is made to vote on the bill.

=== Senate action ===
After final passage in the Alaska House of Representatives, a bill is engrossed and sent to the Alaska Senate to go through the same process of introduction, committee referral and three readings. Likewise, bills that have been approved on Third Reading in the Alaska Senate are engrossed and sent to the Alaska House of Representatives.

=== Enrollment or conference ===
When a bill is not modified in the second house, it can be sent to the governor on Third Reading, through enrollment. If the bill is modified, the house of origin must vote to accept or reject amendments by the opposite house. A Fourth Reading, in the case of acceptance, will send the bill to the governor, through enrollment. If amendments are rejected, the bill can be sent to conference, where members of the Senate and House hash out a final version and send it to a Fourth Reading in both houses.

=== Governor and veto override ===
The governor can choose to sign or veto the legislation. In the case of the veto, a two-thirds majority of a joint session can override the veto. An appropriations bill requires a three-fourths majority vote in a joint session to override a veto. If signed or approved by a veto override, the legislation becomes law.

== Membership ==
=== Terms and qualifications ===
State representatives must be a qualified voter and resident of Alaska for no less than three years, and a resident of the district from which elected for one year immediately preceding filing for office. A state representative must be 21 years of age at the time the oath of office is taken. The Alaska House of Representatives may expel a member with the concurrence of two-thirds of the membership of the house.

Legislative terms begin on the second Monday in January following a presidential election year and on the third Tuesday in January following a gubernatorial election. State representatives serve for terms of two years.

=== Leadership ===
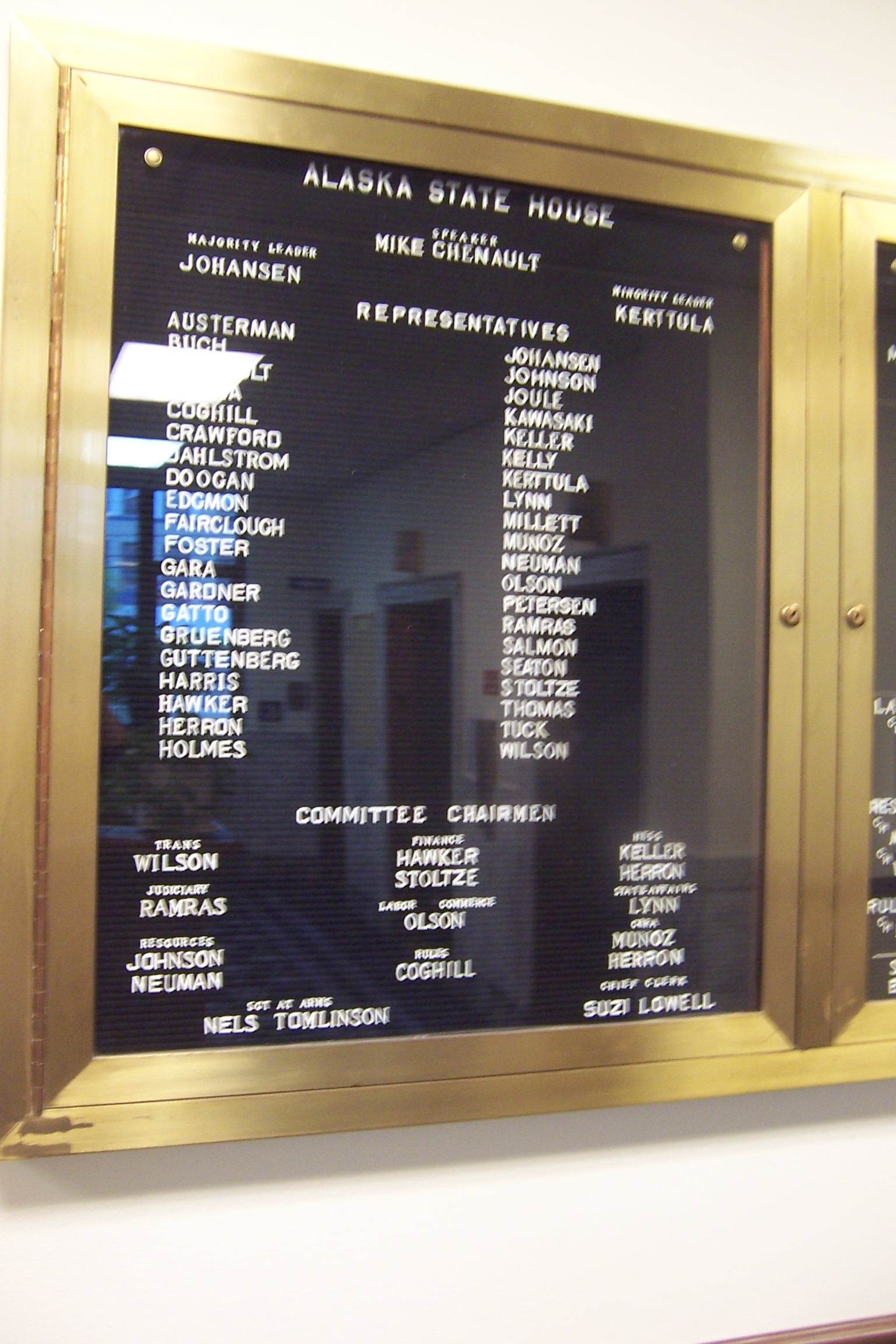
House of Representatives member directory in the hallway of the Capitol building. Taken in 2009, this shows the House membership during the 26th Legislature.

The Speaker of the House presides over the House of Representatives. The Speaker is elected by the majority party caucus followed by confirmation of the full House through the passage of a House Resolution. In addition to presiding over the body, the Speaker is also the chief leadership position, and controls the flow of legislation and committee assignments. Other House leaders, such as the majority and minority leaders, are elected by their respective party caucuses relative to their party's strength in the chamber.

Position	Representative	Party	Caucus	Residence	District
Speaker of the House	Bryce Edgmon	Ind	Majority	Dillingham	37
Majority Leader	Chuck Kopp	Rep	Majority	Anchorage	10
Majority Whip	Zack Fields	Dem	Majority	Anchorage	19
Minority Leader	DeLena Johnson	Rep	Minority	Palmer	25
Minority Whip	Justin Ruffridge	Rep	Minority	Soldotna	7

=== Current composition ===
The 21-member majority caucus consists of all 14 Democrats, all 5 Independents and 2 Republicans. The 19-member minority caucus consists of 19 Republicans.

↓
14	5	2	19
Democratic	I	R	Republican

Affiliation	Party (Shading indicates majority caucus)							Total	Vacant
Affiliation	Republican			Independent		Democratic		Total	Vacant
End of 28th Legislature	26			0		4	10	40	0
Begin 29th Legislature (2015)	23			1		4	12	40	0
End of 29th (2016)	1	22		1		4	12	40	0
30th Legislature (2017–2018)	18		3	2		17		40	0
Begin 31st Legislature (2019)	15		8	2		15		40	0
End 31st (2020)	16	1	5	2		15		39	1
32nd Legislature (2021–2022)	17	2	2	4		15		40	0
Begin 33rd Legislature (2023)	19	1	1	2	4	2	11	40	0
End 33rd (2024)	20	1	1	1	4	2	11	40	0
Begin 34th Legislature (2025)	19		2	5		14		40	0
November 29, 2025	17		2	5		14		38	2
December 30, 2025	19		2	5		14		40	0
Latest voting share	47.5%		52.5%						

Past partisan compositions can be found on Political party strength in Alaska.

== Committees ==
Current committees include:

- Judiciary
- Resources
- State Affairs
- Economic Development, Trade, Tourism, and the Arctic
- Fisheries
- Committee on Committees
- Task Force on Sustainable Education
- Community & Regional Affairs
- Education
- Energy
- Military & Veterans' Affairs
- Health & Social Services
- Labor & Commerce
- Transportation
- Rules
- Finance
  - Education & Early Development
  - Governor
  - Labor & Workforce Development
  - Health & Social Services
  - Legislature
  - Military & Veterans' Affairs
  - Natural Resources
  - Public Safety
  - Revenue
  - Transportation & Public Facilities
  - University Of Alaska
  - Administration
  - Commerce, Community & Economic Dev
  - Corrections
  - Court System
  - Environmental Conservation
  - Fish & Game
  - Law
  - Fiscal Policy

== Current members (34th Alaska State Legislature) ==
Alaska House of Representatives 34th Alaska State Legislature, 2025–27
District	Name	Party	Caucus	Residence	Start
1	Jeremy Bynum	Rep	Minority	Ketchikan	2025
2	Rebecca Himschoot	Ind	Majority	Sitka	2023
3	Andi Story	Dem	Majority	Juneau	2019
4	Sara Hannan	Dem	Majority	Juneau	2019
5	Louise Stutes	Rep	Majority	Kodiak	2015
6	Sarah Vance	Rep	Minority	Homer	2019
7	Justin Ruffridge	Rep	Minority	Soldotna	2023
8	Bill Elam	Rep	Minority	Nikiski	2025
9	Ky Holland	Ind	Majority	Anchorage	2025
10	Chuck Kopp (Note: Kopp previously served in the state house from 2017–2023.)	Rep	Majority	Anchorage	2025
11	Julie Coulombe	Rep	Minority	Anchorage	2023
12	Calvin Schrage	Ind	Majority	Anchorage	2021
13	Andy Josephson	Dem	Majority	Anchorage	2013
14	Alyse Galvin	Ind	Majority	Anchorage	2023
15	Mia Costello (Note: Costello previously served in the state house from 2011–2015.)	Rep	Minority	Anchorage	2025
16	Carolyn Hall	Dem	Majority	Anchorage	2025
17	Zack Fields	Dem	Majority	Anchorage	2019
18	David Nelson (Note: Nelson previously served in the state house from 2021–2023.)	Rep	Minority	Anchorage	2025
19	Genevieve Mina	Dem	Majority	Anchorage	2023
20	Andrew Gray	Dem	Majority	Anchorage	2023
21	Donna Mears	Dem	Majority	Anchorage	2023
22	Ted Eischeid	Dem	Majority	Anchorage	2025
23	Jamie Allard	Rep	Minority	Eagle River	2023
24	Dan Saddler (Note: Saddler previously served in the state house from 2011–2019.)	Rep	Minority	Eagle River	2023
25	DeLena Johnson	Rep	Minority	Palmer	2017
26	Steve St. Clair	Rep	Minority	Wasilla	2025 (Note: Originally appointed.)
27	Jubilee Underwood	Rep	Minority	Wasilla	2025
28	Elexie Moore	Rep	Minority	Wasilla	2025
29	Garret Nelson	Rep	Minority	Sutton	2025
30	Kevin McCabe	Rep	Minority	Big Lake	2021
31	Maxine Dibert	Dem	Majority	Fairbanks	2023
32	Will Stapp	Rep	Minority	Fairbanks	2023
33	Mike Prax	Rep	Minority	North Pole	2019
34	Frank Tomaszewski	Rep	Minority	Fairbanks	2023
35	Ashley Carrick	Dem	Majority	Fairbanks	2023
36	Rebecca Schwanke	Rep	Minority	Glennallen	2025
37	Bryce Edgmon	Ind (Note: Edgmon served as a Democrat from 2007–2019 and as an Independent from 2019–present.)	Majority	Dillingham	2007
38	Nellie Jimmie	Dem	Majority	Toksook Bay	2025
39	Neal Foster	Dem	Majority	Nome	2009
40	Robyn Frier	Dem	Majority	Utqiagvik	2025

== See also ==
- Alaska Senate
- Alaska State Capitol
- List of Alaska State Legislatures
- Impeachment in Alaska
