= 2026 Alaska House of Representatives election =

2026 election in Alaska

2026 Alaska House of Representatives elections
- November 3, 2026

All 40 seats in the Alaska House of Representatives 21 seats needed for a majority

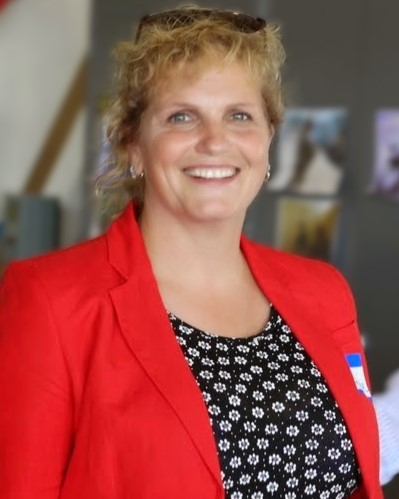

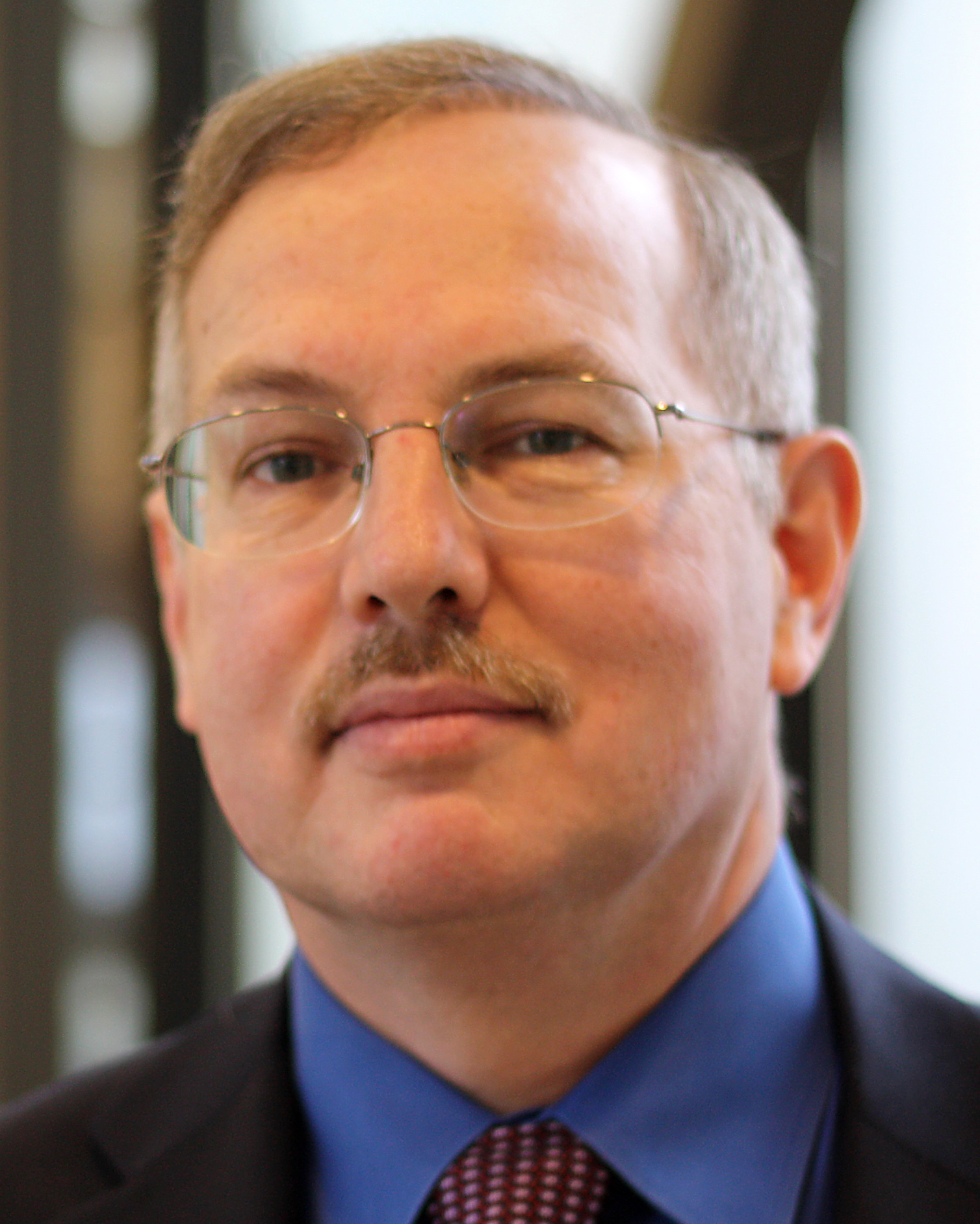
	Majority party	Minority party	Third party
Leader	—	DeLena Johnson	Bryce Edgmon (retiring)
Party	Democratic	Republican	Independent
Leader since	—	November 29, 2025	January 21, 2025
Leader's seat	—	25th–Palmer	37th–Dillingham
Last election	14 seats, 26.03%	21 seats, 55.51%	5 seats, 15.24%
Seats before	14 (Note: All Democrats and independents and two Republicans form a governing coalition)	21	5
Seats won	17	16	7
Seat change	▲3	▼5	▲2
- Map of Incumbents: Republican incumbent Republican incumbent retiring Democratic incumbent Democratic incumbent retiring Independent incumbent Independent incumbent retiring
Speaker before election
Bryce Edgmon
Independent (Coalition)
Elected Speaker
TBD

The 2026 Alaska House of Representatives election took place on November 3, 2026. All 40 seats in the Alaska House of Representatives were up for election.

== Background ==
=== Pre-election composition ===
Following the 2024 election, a new majority coalition formed, composed of 14 Democrats, five independents, and two Republicans. The coalition, led by independent representative Bryce Edgmon, flipped the chamber from a mostly Republican coalition.

In February 2025, the Democratic Legislative Campaign Committee shared their plans for the 2026 cycle, which included flipping both the Alaska Senate and House of Representatives.

In late 2025, state senators Shelley Hughes and Mike Shower resigned to focus on their respective campaigns in the 2026 Alaska gubernatorial election. Governor Mike Dunleavy tapped Republican minority representatives Cathy Tilton and George Rauscher to fill their seats, creating two new vacancies in the House. The vacancies are expected to be filled via appointment by January 2026. In November 2025, Republican minority leader Mia Costello stepped down from her position, with DeLena Johnson being selected to succeed Costello.

== Outgoing incumbents ==
=== Retirements ===
==== Republicans ====
1. District 5: Louise Stutes is retiring to run for State Senate.
2. District 18: David Nelson is retiring.
3. District 24: Dan Saddler is retiring.
4. District 34: Frank Tomaszewski is retiring to run for State Senate.

==== Democrats ====
1. District 13: Andy Josephson is retiring.

==== Independents ====
1. District 37: Bryce Edgmon is retiring to run for State Senate.

== Campaign ==
Many open seats have attracted considerable attention and spending amid the tight contest over control of the chamber, in addition to heavy spending in races with vulnerable incumbents. While very few seats are hosting competitive primaries with more than four candidates, the most competitive races still brought in significant fundraising in the leadup to them. Candidates expected to caucus with the existing bipartisan coalition have raised the most, with a number of outside groups boosting them as well.

No incumbent representatives failed to advance to the general election. Democratic candidates performed particularly well, with none of their incumbents trailing Republicans, while a number of Republicans trailed Democratic or Independent challengers. These results indicated a likely continuation of the state's Democratic-led coalition, if they carry over to the general election, signalling more opportunities for the coalition to make gains than for the Republican minority. Following the primary election, 10 candidates withdrew from the general election across the state.

== Predictions ==
Source	Ranking	As of
Sabato's Crystal Ball	Lean Coalition	January 22, 2026
State Navigate	Likely Coalition	October 14, 2026

== Overview ==
Primary election – August 18, 2026
Party	Votes	%	Candidates	Advanced to general	Seats contesting
Republican	68,947	46.50%	47	40	32
Democratic	45,913	30.96%	29	27	24
Independent	33,092	22.32%	28	24	19
Libertarian	326	0.22%	2	1	1
Totals	148,278	100.0%	106	92	—

General election – November 3, 2026
Party	Candidates	Seats contesting	Seats won (Note: results as of 16 November 2026)	First preference votes	%
Republican	40	32	9	127,642	45%
Democratic	27	24	14	77,625	27,4%
Independent	27	18	6	52,613	18.6%
Libertarian	1	1	0	278	0.1%
Totals	92	—			100.0%
Registered voters/Turnout			605433		

== Summary of results ==
District	2024 pres.	Incumbent	Party	Elected representative	Party
1	R +17.4	Jeremy Bynum	Rep	Jeremy Bynum	Rep
2	D +0.4	Rebecca Himschoot	Ind	Rebecca Himschoot	Ind
3	D +14.7	Andi Story	Dem	Andi Story	Dem
4	D +37.5	Sara Hannan	Dem	Sara Hannan	Dem
5	R +12.8	Louise Stutes†	Rep	Kathy Simpler	Ind
6	R +16.1	Sarah Vance	Rep	Brent Johnson	Ind
7	R +44.4	Justin Ruffridge	Rep	Justin Ruffridge	Rep
8	R +49.7	Bill Elam	Rep	Bill Elam	Rep
9	D +2.3	Ky Holland	Ind	Ky Holland	Ind
10	R +3.3	Chuck Kopp	Rep	Chuck Kopp	Rep
11	R +2.3	Julie Coulombe	Rep	Julie Coulombe	Rep
12	D +1.3	Calvin Schrage	Ind	Calvin Schrage	Ind
13	D +1.2	Andy Josephson	Dem	Lisa Keller	Dem
14	D +21.2	Alyse Galvin	Ind	Alyse Galvin	Ind
15	R +2.5	Mia Costello	Rep	Denny Wells	Dem
16	D +14.6	Carolyn Hall	Dem	Carolyn Hall	Dem
17	D +33.5	Zack Fields	Dem	Zack Fields	Dem
18	R +15.7	David Nelson†	Rep	Cliff Groh	Dem
19	D +17.0	Genevieve Mina	Dem	Genevieve Mina	Dem
20	D +12.2	Andrew Gray	Dem	Andrew Gray	Dem
21	D +8.0	Donna Mears	Dem	Donna Mears	Dem
22	D +1.2	Ted Eischeid	Dem	Ted Eischeid	Dem
23	R +18.6	Jamie Allard	Rep	Jamie Allard	Rep
24	R +32.1	Dan Saddler†	Rep	Ken McCarty	Rep
25	R +35.6	DeLena Johnson	Rep	DeLena Johnson	Rep
26	R +54.3	Steve St. Clair	Rep	Steve St. Clair	Rep
27	R +56.2	Jubilee Underwood	Rep	Jubilee Underwood	Rep
28	R +48.5	Elexie Moore	Rep	Stephen Wright	Rep
29	R +44.9	Garret Nelson	Rep	Garret Nelson	Rep
30	R +44.7	Kevin McCabe	Rep	Doug Massie	Rep
31	R +3.4	Maxine Dibert	Dem	Maxine Dibert	Dem
32	R +35.2	William Stapp	Rep	William Stapp	Rep
33	R +51.2	Mike Prax	Rep	Mike Prax	Rep
34	R +20.7	Frank Tomaszewski†	Rep	Joy Cottle	Ind
35	D +5.0	Ashley Carrick	Dem	Ashley Carrick	Dem
36	R +21.8	Rebecca Schwanke	Rep	Rebecca Schwanke	Rep
37	R +6.6	Bryce Edgmon†	Ind	Evelynn Trefon	Dem
38	D +11.8	Nellie Jimmie	Dem	Nellie Jimmie	Dem
39	D +11.7	Neal Foster	Dem	Neal Foster	Dem
40	R +9.9	Robyn Frier	Dem	Robyn Frier	Dem

== Detailed results ==
=== District 1 ===
Incumbent Republican Jeremy Bynum was seeking re-election. Grant EchoHawk, a former member of the Ketchikan Gateway Borough Assembly, ran against him.

Primary election
Party	Candidate	Votes	%
Republican	Jeremy Bynum (incumbent)	2,006	55.6
Independent	Grant Echohawk	1,604	44.4
Total votes		3,610	100.0

2026 Alaska House of Representatives election, District 1
Party	Candidate	Votes	%
Republican	Jeremy Bynum	4,002	58.6
Independent	Grant Echohawk (Note: Listed on the ballot as "Nonpartisan")	2,808	41.1
Write-in		18	0.3
Total votes		6,828	100.0
Republican hold			

=== District 2 ===
Incumbent independent Rebecca Himschoot was challenged by Republican "Kenny Karl" Skaflestad, the former mayor of Hoonah. Himschoot was re-elected.

Primary election
Party	Candidate	Votes	%
Independent	Rebecca Himschoot (incumbent)	2,915	69.2
Republican	"Kenny Karl" Skaflestad	1,160	27.6
Independent	Alston Evans	135	3.2
Total votes		4,210	100.0

2026 Alaska House of Representatives election, District 2
Party	Candidate	Votes	%
Independent	Rebecca Himschoot (incumbent)	4,651	60.5
Republican	"Kenny Karl" Skaflestad	2,654	34.5
Independent	Alston Evans (Note: Listed on ballot as "Undeclared")	359	4.7
Write-in		19	0.3
Total votes		7,683	100.0
Independent hold			

=== District 3 ===
Incumbent Democrat Andi Story was challenged by Republican Annette Kreitzer, the former Haines Borough manager. Story was re-elected.

Primary election
Party	Candidate	Votes	%
Democratic	Andi Story (incumbent)	3,831	70.6
Republican	Annette Kreitzer	1,592	29.4
Total votes		5,423	100.0

2026 Alaska House of Representatives election, District 3
Party	Candidate	Votes	%
Democratic	Andi Story (incumbent)	6,080	66.7
Republican	Annette Kreitzer	3,021	33.1
Write-in		19	0.2
Total votes		9,120	100.0
Democratic hold			

=== District 4 ===
Incumbent Democrat Sara Hannan won reelection unopposed.

Primary election
Party	Candidate	Votes	%
Democratic	Sara Hannan (incumbent)	4,000	100.0
Total votes		4,000	100.0

2026 Alaska House of Representatives election, District 4
Party	Candidate	Votes	%
Democratic	Sara Hannan (incumbent)	6,359	96.2
Write-in		252	3.8
Total votes		6,611	100.0
Democratic hold			

=== District 5 ===
Incumbent coalition Republican Louise Stutes did not seek re-election, as she was running for State Senate instead. Republican Sheldon Prout did not say if he would join the coalition, while independent Kathy Simpler, a teacher and National Education Association board member, indicated that she would join. Simpler won the election.

Primary election
Party	Candidate	Votes	%
Independent	Kathy Simpler	2,100	61.4
Republican	Sheldon Prout	1,319	38.6
Total votes		3,419	100.0

2026 Alaska House of Representatives election, District 5
Party	Candidate	Votes	%
Independent	Kathy Simpler	3,511	58.4
Republican	Sheldon Prout	2,493	41.4
Write-in		13	0.2
Total votes		6,017	100.0
Independent gain from Republican			

=== District 6 ===
Incumbent Republican Sarah Vance lost reelection against independent Brent Johnson, who had also challenged her in 2024.

Primary election
Party	Candidate	Votes	%
Independent	Brent Johnson	3,682	56.9
Republican	Sarah Vance (incumbent)	2,792	43.1
Total votes		6,474	100.0

2026 Alaska House of Representatives election, District 6
Party	Candidate	Votes	%
Independent	Brent Johnson	5,088	50.2
Republican	Sarah Vance (incumbent)	5,029	49.6
Write-in		11	0.1
Total votes		10,128	100.0
Independent gain from Republican			

=== District 7 ===
Incumbent Republican Justin Ruffridge won re-election.

Primary election
Party	Candidate	Votes	%
Republican	Justin Ruffridge (incumbent)	2,761	74.0
Democratic	Kate Veh	972	26.0
Total votes		3,733	100.0

2024 Alaska House of Representatives election, District 7
Party	Candidate	Votes	%
Republican	Justin Ruffridge (incumbent)	5,538	74.7
Democratic	Kate Veh	1,841	24.8
Write-in		37	0.5
Total votes		7,416	100.0
Republican hold			

=== District 8 ===
Incumbent Republican Bill Elam won reelection.

Primary election
Party	Candidate	Votes	%
Republican	Bill Elam (incumbent)	3,446	72.5
Independent	Nissa Savage	816	17.2
Independent	Frank Quinn	492	10.3
Total votes		4,754	100.0

2026 Alaska House of Representatives elections, District 8
Party	Candidate	Votes	%
Republican	Bill Elam (incumbent)	6,374	74.2
Independent	Nissa Savage	1,621	18.9
Independent	Frank Quinn	568	6.6
Write-in		29	0.3
Total votes		8,592	100.0
Republican hold			

=== District 9 ===
Incumbent independent Ky Holland is seeking reelection. Republican John Boyle, a former commissioner of the Alaska Department of Natural Resources, is challenging him.

Primary election
Party	Candidate	Votes	%
Independent	Ky Holland (incumbent)	3,984	59.9
Republican	John Boyle	2,674	40.1
Total votes		6,661	100.0

2026 Alaska House of Representatives election, District 9
Party	Candidate	Votes	%
Independent	Ky Holland (incumbent)	5,812	55.8
Republican	John Boyle	4,589	44.0
Write-in		14	0.1
Total votes		10,415	100.0
Independent hold			

=== District 10 ===
Incumbent coalition Republican Chuck Kopp won reelection unopposed.

Primary election
Party	Candidate	Votes	%
Republican	Chuck Kopp (incumbent)	3,117	100.0
Total votes		3,117	100.0

2026 Alaska House of Representatives election, District 10
Party	Candidate	Votes	%
Republican	Chuck Kopp	5,727	96.1
Write-in		230	3.9
Total votes		5,957	100.0
Republican hold			

=== District 11 ===
Incumbent Republican Julie Coulombe won reelection.

Primary election
Party	Candidate	Votes	%
Republican	Julie Coulombe (incumbent)	2,426	50.6
Democratic	Danni Hall	2,371	49.4
Total votes		4,797	100.0

2024 Alaska House of Representatives election, District 11
Party	Candidate	Votes	%
Republican	Julie Coulombe (incumbent)	4,306	50.7
Democratic	Danni Hall	4,175	49.1
Write-in		18	0.2
Total votes		8,499	100.0
Republican hold			

=== District 12 ===
Incumbent independent Calvin Schrage won reelection.

Primary election
Party	Candidate	Votes	%
Independent	Calvin Schrage (incumbent)	2,604	70.4
Republican	Jieun McDonald	1,095	29.6
Total votes		3,699	100.0

2026 Alaska House of Representatives election, District 12
Party	Candidate	Votes	%
Independent	Calvin Schrage (incumbent)	4,965	68.9
Republican	Jieun McDonald	2,222	30.8
Write-in		23	0.3
Total votes		7,210	100.0
Independent hold			

=== District 13 ===
Incumbent Democrat Andy Josephson did not seek reelection. Democrat Lisa Keller ran unopposed after fellow Democrat Felix Rivera withdrew following the primary election. Republican Sarah Short filed for this seat but was denied a place on the ballot due to improper paperwork.

Primary election
Party	Candidate	Votes	%
Democratic	Lisa Keller	2,019	72.0
Democratic	Felix Rivera (withdrew)	785	28.0
Total votes		2,804	100.0

2024 Alaska House of Representatives election, District 13
Party	Candidate	Votes	%
Democratic	Keller, Lisa M.	4,455	91.1
Write-in		436	8.9
Total votes		4,891	100.0
Democratic hold			

=== District 14 ===
Incumbent independent Alyse Galvin won reelection against fellow independent candidate Russell Wyatt.

Primary election
Party	Candidate	Votes	%
Independent	Alyse Galvin (incumbent)	2,897	82.9
Independent	Russell Wyatt	597	17.1
Total votes		3,494	100.0

2026 Alaska House of Representatives election, District 14
Party	Candidate	Votes	%
Independent	Alyse Galvin (incumbent)	4,880	82.9
Independent	Russell Wyatt	940	16.0
Write-in		69	1.2
Total votes		5,889	100.0
Independent hold			

=== District 15 ===
Democrat Denny Wells defeated Incumbent Republican (and former House minority leader) Mia Costello. This was a reversal of 2024's result where Costello won.

Primary election
Party	Candidate	Votes	%
Democratic	Denny Wells	2,351	52.7
Republican	Mia Costello (incumbent)	2,107	47.3
Total votes		4,458	100.0

2026 Alaska House of Representatives election, District 15
Party	Candidate	Votes	%
Democratic	Denny Wells	4,415	54.0
Republican	Mia Costello	3,746	45.8
Write-in		11	0.1
Total votes		8,172	100.0
Democratic gain from Republican			

=== District 16 ===
Incumbent Democrat Carolyn Hall won re-election. She was challenged by former Republican representative Liz Vazquez.

Primary election
Party	Candidate	Votes	%
Democratic	Carolyn Hall (incumbent)	3,178	62.8
Republican	Liz Vazquez	1,721	34.0
Independent	Phil Isley	165	3.3
Total votes		5,064	100.0

2026 Alaska House of Representatives election, District 16
Party	Candidate	Votes	%
Democratic	Carolyn Hall (incumbent)	4,815	58.3
Republican	Liz Vazquez	3,088	37.4
Independent	Phil Isley	347	4.2
Write-in		15	0.2
Total votes		8,265	100.0
Democratic hold			

=== District 17 ===
Incumbent Democrat Zack Fields won reelection. Independent Mathew Salisbury withdrew following the primary election.

Primary election
Party	Candidate	Votes	%
Democratic	Zack Fields (incumbent)	2,962	73.2
Republican	Daniel Bradley	841	20.8
Independent	Mathew Salisbury (withdrew)	242	6.0
Total votes		4,045	100.0

2026 Alaska House of Representatives election, District 17
Party	Candidate	Votes	%
Democratic	Zack Fields (incumbent)	4,702	73.6
Republican	Daniel Bradley	1,650	25.8
Write-in		41	0.6
Total votes		6,393	100.0
Democratic hold			

=== District 18 ===
Incumbent Republican David Nelson did not seek re-election. Former Democratic representative Cliff Groh, whom Nelson narrowly defeated in 2024, won back his old seat.

After Nelson announced his retirement, Republican Dan Sager entered the race after being unable to convince anyone else to do so. District 18 contains Joint Base Elmendorf–Richardson, giving it a high military population with significant resident turnover. This also leads to disproportionately low turnout among voters relative to the rest of the state.

Primary election
Party	Candidate	Votes	%
Democratic	Cliff Groh	640	67.2
Republican	Dan Sager	313	32.8
Total votes		953	100.0

2026 Alaska House of Representatives election, District 18
Party	Candidate	Votes	%
Democratic	Cliff Groh	1,564	64.2
Republican	Dan Sager	871	35.8
Write-in		1	0.0
Total votes		2,436	100.0
Democratic gain from Republican			

=== District 19 ===
Incumbent Democrat Genevieve Mina was unopposed and won reelection.

Primary election
Party	Candidate	Votes	%
Democratic	Genevieve Mina (incumbent)	1,589	100.0
Total votes		1,589	100.0

2026 Alaska House of Representatives election, District 19
Party	Candidate	Votes	%
Democratic	Genevieve Mina (incumbent)	3,175	94.8
Write-in		173	5.2
Total votes		3,348	100.0
Democratic hold			

=== District 20 ===
Incumbent Democrat Andrew Gray won reelection.

Primary election
Party	Candidate	Votes	%
Democratic	Andrew Gray (incumbent)	1,926	65.4
Independent	Paul Bauer	1,020	34.6
Total votes		2,946	100.0

2026 Alaska House of Representatives election, District 20
Party	Candidate	Votes	%
Democratic	Andrew Gray	3,539	62.8
Independent	Paul Bauer	2,050	36.4
Write-in		46	0.8
Total votes		5,635	100.0
Democratic hold			

=== District 21 ===
Incumbent Democrat Donna Mears won reelection.

Primary election
Party	Candidate	Votes	%
Democratic	Donna Mears (incumbent)	2,680	61.3
Republican	Aimeé Sims	1,694	38.7
Total votes		4,374	100.0

2026 Alaska House of Representatives election, District 21
Party	Candidate	Votes	%
Democratic	Donna Mears (incumbent)	4,512	59.4
Republican	Aimeé Sims	3,075	40.5
Write-in		12	0.2
Total votes		7,599	100.0
Democratic hold			

=== District 22 ===
Incumbent Democrat Ted Eischeid is seeking reelection. The Alaska Democratic Party sued to disqualify Eischeid's Republican opponent, Jose Tagle, over incomplete campaign finance disclosure forms, leaving Eischeid unopposed in the general election.

Primary election
Party	Candidate	Votes	%
Democratic	Ted Eischeid (incumbent)	1,267	64.18%
Republican	Jose Roel Tagle (disqualified)	707	35.82%
Total votes		1,974	100.0%

2026 Alaska House of Representatives election, District 22
Party	Candidate	Votes	%
Democratic	Ted Eischeid (incumbent)	2,729	63.3
Republican	Jose Roel Tagle	1,572	36.4
Write-in		13	0.3
Total votes		4,314	100.0
Democratic hold			

=== District 23 ===
Incumbent Republican Jamie Allard is seeking reelection. She faces four challengers, including Democrat Jim Arlington, whom Allard defeated in 2024.

Primary election
Party	Candidate	Votes	%
Republican	Jamie Allard (incumbent)	1,965	39.8
Democratic	Jim Arlington	1,574	31.9
Republican	Ruby Jones	688	13.9
Republican	Nick Capozzi (withdrew)	427	8.6
Democratic	Lee Hammermeister	286	5.8
Total votes		4,940	100.0

General election
Party	Candidate	First choice			Round 1			Round 2			Round 3	
Party	Candidate	Votes	%	Transfer	Votes	%	Transfer	Votes	%	Transfer	Votes	%
Republican	Jamie Allard	3,314	37.9%	+9	3,323	38.0%	+39	3,362	39.3%	+812	4,174	54.1%
Democratic	Jim Arlington	2,504	28.6%	+0	2,504	28.6%	+340	2,844	33.3%	+703	3,547	45.9%
Republican	Ruby Jones	2,267	25.9%	+4	2,271	26.0%	+68	2,339	27.4%	-2,339	Eliminated	
Republican	Lee Hammermeister	640	7.3%	+2	642	7.4%	-642	Eliminated				
Write-in		17	0.2%	-17	Eliminated							
Total votes		8,742			8,740			8,545			7,721	
Blank or inactive ballots					208		+195	403		+824	1,227	

=== District 24 ===
Incumbent Republican Dan Saddler did not seek re-election. The race was contested by 3 republicans: Ken McCarty, Gina Wall and Sharon Jackson, but Jackson dropped out after finishing 3rd in the primary.

McCarty had a narrow lead of 19 votes in the general election, but the presence of write-in votes meant neither candidate reached the 50% threshold needed to win without ranked choice voting tabulations. McCarty's lead expanded to 26 votes after write-in votes were redistributed to their 2nd choices, making him the apparent winner.

The margin was less than the 0.5% threshold for the state to fund a recount, if requested by a candidate or 10 voters in the district. Wall stated, "The margin is very close, and if the state conducts an automatic recount, I will respect and participate in that process. Otherwise, I accept the outcome and look forward to moving ahead".

Primary election
Party	Candidate	Votes	%
Republican	Ken McCarty	1,918	46.8
Republican	Gina Wall	1,386	33.8
Republican	Sharon Jackson (withdrew)	793	19.4
Total votes		4,097	100.0

General election
Party	Candidate	First choice			Round 1	
Party	Candidate	Votes	%	Transfer	Votes	%
Republican	Ken McCarty	3,745	49.4%	+23	3,768	50.2%
Republican	Gina Wall	3,726	49.2%	+16	3,742	49.8%
Write-in		104	1.4%	-104	Eliminated	
Total votes		7,575			7,510	
Blank or inactive ballots					887	

=== District 25 ===
Incumbent Republican DeLena Johnson sought reelection and was challenged by independent Steven Merritt and fellow Republican Michael Bowles. All 3 candidates received at least 30% of the first choice vote. However, Johnson had the most first place votes and expanded her lead during ranked choice voting tabulations, leading to her re-election.

Primary election
Party	Candidate	Votes	%
Republican	DeLena Johnson (incumbent)	1,907	40.2
Independent	Steven Merritt	1,562	32.9
Republican	Michael Bowles	1,275	26.9
Total votes		4,744	100.0

General election
Party	Candidate	First choice			Round 1			Round 2	
Party	Candidate	Votes	%	Transfer	Votes	%	Transfer	Votes	%
Republican	DeLena Johnson (incumbent)	2,975	35.4%	+6	2,981	35.5%	+598	3,579	55.3%
Republican	Michael Bowles	2,716	32.3%	+3	2,719	32.3%	+175	2,894	44.7%
Independent	Steven Merritt	2,697	32.0%	+9	2,706	32.2%	-2,706	Eliminated	
Write-in		26	0.2%	-26	Eliminated				
Total votes		8,414			8,406			6,473	
Blank or inactive ballots					417		+1933	2,350	

=== District 26 ===
Incumbent Republican Cathy Tilton resigned in November 2025 after being appointed to the Alaska State Senate by governor Mike Dunleavy. Tilton's former aide Steve St. Clair was appointed to succeed her. St. Clair was reelected.

Primary election
Party	Candidate	Votes	%
Republican	Steve St. Clair (incumbent)	1,686	45.0
Republican	Donna Anthony (withdrew)	1,076	28.7
Democratic	Jeanne Troshynski	986	26.3
Total votes		3,748	100.0

2026 Alaska House of Representatives election, District 26
Party	Candidate	Votes	%
Republican	Steve St. Clair (incumbent)	5,455	72.9
Democratic	Jeanne Troshynski	2,010	26.8
Write-in		22	0.3
Total votes		7,487	100.0
Republican hold			

=== District 27 ===
Incumbent Republican Jubilee Underwood won reelection. Highly-controversial former Republican representative David Eastman, a member of the far-right Oath Keepers, whom Underwood narrowly defeated in 2024, challenged her for his old seat.

Primary election
Party	Candidate	Votes	%
Republican	Jubilee Underwood (incumbent)	1,662	54.8
Republican	David Eastman	1,639	45.2
Total votes		3,031	100.0

2026 Alaska House of Representatives election, District 27
Party	Candidate	Votes	%
Republican	Jubilee Underwood	3,342	51.5
Republican	David Eastman	3,047	47.0
Write-in		96	1.5
Total votes		6,485	100.0
Republican hold			

=== District 28 ===
Incumbent Republican Elexie Moore lost her re-election attempt to Republican Stephen Wright.

Primary election
Party	Candidate	Votes	%
Republican	Elexie Moore (incumbent)	1,209	34.0
Republican	Stephen Wright	1,126	31.6
Democratic	Kit Kennedy	1,018	28.6
Republican	Evan Bordenkircher (withdrew)	207	5.8
Total votes		3,560	100.0

General election
Party	Candidate	First choice			Round 1			Round 2	
Party	Candidate	Votes	%	Transfer	Votes	%	Transfer	Votes	%
Republican	Stephen Wright	2,649	37.5%	+5	2,654	37.6%	+215	2,869	50.4%
Republican	Elexie Moore (Incumbent)	2,439	34.6%	+14	2,453	34.7%	+370	2,823	49.6%
Democratic	Kit Kennedy	1,951	27.6%	+6	1,957	27.7%	-2,706	Eliminated	
Write-in		26	0.4%	-26	Eliminated				
Total votes		7,065			7,064			5,692	
Blank or inactive ballots					278		+1,372	1,650	

=== District 29 ===
Incumbent Republican George Rauscher resigned in November 2025 after being appointed to the Alaska State Senate by Governor Mike Dunleavy. Garret Nelson was appointed to succeed Rauscher. Nelson is running for a full term.

Primary election
Party	Candidate	Votes	%
Republican	Steve Menard	1,806	39.4
Republican	Garret Nelson (incumbent)	1,063	23.2
Democratic	Kimberly Stone	1,058	23.1
Independent	Jessica Kusner-Kalarchik	366	8.0
Libertarian	Candice Frisby	194	4.2
Independent	Amber Hansen	92	2.0
Total votes		4,579	100.0

=== District 30 ===
Incumbent Republican Kevin J. McCabe is seeking reelection.

Primary election
Party	Candidate	Votes	%
Republican	Kevin J. McCabe (incumbent)	1,482	32.4
Democratic	Sandra Loomis	1,337	29.2
Republican	Doug Massie	944	20.6
Republican	Doyle Holmes (withdrew)	591	12.9
Republican	Mike Alexander (withdrew)	219	4.8
Total votes		4,573	100.0

=== District 31 ===
Incumbent Democrat Maxine Dibert won re-election.

Primary election
Party	Candidate	Votes	%
Democratic	Maxine Dibert (incumbent)	1,845	58.9
Republican	Aimeé Moore	1,154	36.9
Libertarian	Jonathan Powell-Mark	132	4.2
Total votes		3,131	100.0

2026 Alaska House of Representatives election, District 31
Party	Candidate	Votes	%
Democratic	Dibert, Maxine L.	3,300	59.6
Republican	Moore, Aimée	1,950	35.2
Libertarian	Powell-Mark, Jonathan	279	5.0
Write-in		9	0.2
Total votes		5,538	100.0
Democratic hold			

=== District 32 ===
Incumbent Republican Will Stapp won reelection unopposed.

Primary election
Party	Candidate	Votes	%
Republican	Will Stapp (incumbent)	1,372	100.0
Total votes		1,372	100.0

2026 Alaska House of Representatives election, District 32
Party	Candidate	Votes	%
Republican	Will Stapp (incumbent)	2,769	94.4
Write-in		165	5.6
Total votes		2,934	100.0
Republican hold			

=== District 33 ===
Incumbent Republican Mike Prax is seeking re-election.

Primary election
Party	Candidate	Votes	%
Republican	Mike Prax (incumbent)	1,339	37.0
Republican	Barbara Haney	1,234	34.1
Independent	Pepper McFarland	1,043	28.8
Total votes		3,616	100.0

=== District 34 ===
Incumbent Republican Frank Tomaszewski ran for State Senate instead of seeking reelection. His wife, Harmony Tomaszewski, ran to replace him, but was defeated by independent Joy Beth Cottle.

Primary election
Party	Candidate	Votes	%
Independent	Joy Beth Cottle	2,484	53.0
Republican	Harmony Tomaszewski	2,204	47.0
Total votes		4,688	100.0

2026 Alaska House of Representatives election, District 34
Party	Candidate	Votes	%
Independent	Joy Beth Cottle	3,941	51.6
Republican	Harmony Tomaszewski	3,677	48.2
Write-in		12	0.2
Total votes		7,630	100.0
Independent gain from Republican			

=== District 35 ===
Incumbent Democrat Ashley Carrick won reelection.

Primary election
Party	Candidate	Votes	%
Democratic	Ashley Carrick (incumbent)	3,092	61.3
Republican	Jeff Rentzel	1,758	34.9
Independent	Bridger Terra	193	3.8
Total votes		5,043	100.0

2026 Alaska House of Representatives election, District 35
Party	Candidate	Votes	%
Democratic	Ashley Carrick (incumbent)	4,920	60.4
Republican	Jeff Rentzel	3,203	39.4
Write-in		16	0.2
Total votes		8,139	100.0
Democratic hold			

=== District 36 ===
Incumbent Republican Rebecca Schwanke won re-election.

Primary election
Party	Candidate	Votes	%
Republican	Rebecca Schwanke (incumbent)	2,341	55.9
Independent	Crystal Jones	1,847	44.1
Total votes		4,188	100.0

2026 Alaska House of Representatives election, District 36
Party	Candidate	Votes	%
Republican	Rebecca Schwanke (incumbent)	4,459	58.0
Independent	Crystal Jones	3,180	41.4
Write-in		50	0.6
Total votes		7,689	100.0
Republican hold			

=== District 37 ===
Incumbent independent and Speaker of the House Bryce Edgmon is not seeking reelection, instead running for State Senate. Seven candidates are running to replace him, including multiple independents who would likely caucus with the existing coalition government Edgmon leads.

Primary election
Party	Candidate	Votes	%
Republican	Brenda Wilson	515	22.6
Democratic	Evelynn Trefon	450	19.8
Independent	Mark Smith	398	17.5
Democratic	Dennis Robinson (withdrew)	343	15.1
Independent	Kim Johnson (withdrew)	243	10.7
Independent	Cade Woods	209	9.2
Independent	Peter Angasan	119	5.2
Total votes		2,277	100.0

=== District 38 ===
Incumbent Democrat Nellie Unangiq Jimmie is seeking reelection. Former Democratic representative CJ McCormick, whom Jimmie narrowly defeated in 2024, is running to reclaim his seat. Independent candidate Joseph Amik withdrew from the election on October 26 and endorsed Jimmie, though he remained on the ballot.

Primary election
Party	Candidate	Votes	%
Democratic	CJ McCormick	528	32.0
Democratic	Nellie “Unangiq” Jimmie (incumbent)	478	29.0
Republican	Willy Keppel	400	24.3
Independent	Joseph Amik	242	14.7
Total votes		1,648	100.0

=== District 39 ===
Incumbent Democrat Neal "Quannaq" Foster is seeking reelection.

Primary election
Party	Candidate	Votes	%
Democratic	Neal “Quannaq” Foster (incumbent)	1,134	52.2
Independent	Tyler Ivanoff	634	29.2
Independent	Papa Joe Okitkun	404	18.6
Total votes		2,172	100.0

=== District 40 ===
Incumbent Democrat Robyn Niayuq Frier defended her seat and was challenged by Kotzebue mayor Saima Chase, who had also ran for this seat in 2024. Frier won reelection.

Primary election
Party	Candidate	Votes	%
Democratic	Robyn Niayuq Frier (incumbent)	721	59.7
Democratic	Saima Chase	487	40.3
Total votes		1,208	100.0

2026 Alaska House of Representatives election, District 40
Party	Candidate	Votes	%
Democratic	Robyn Niayuq Frier (incumbent)	1,675	59.6
Democratic	Saima Chase	1,099	39.1
Write-in		34	1.2
Total votes		2,808	100.0
Democratic hold			
