= 2022 Alaska House of Representatives election =

2022 Alaska House of Representatives elections
- November 8, 2022

All 40 seats in the Alaska House of Representatives 21 seats needed for a majority
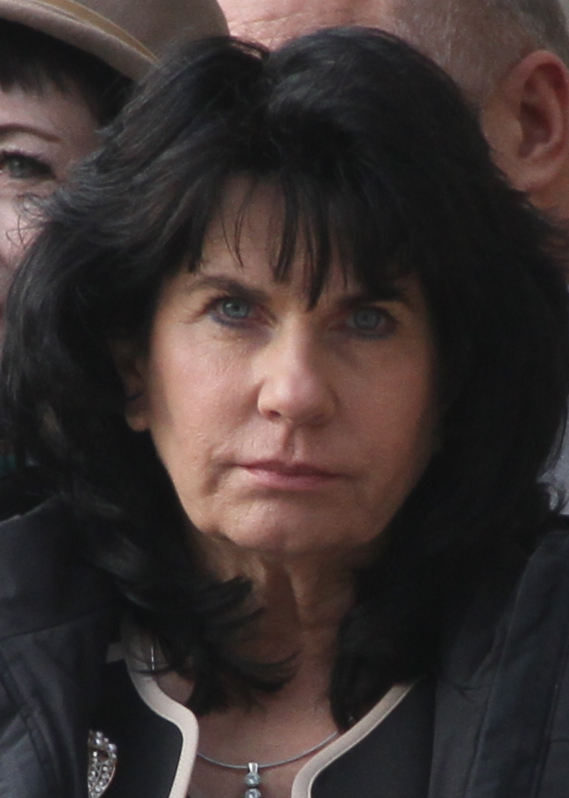

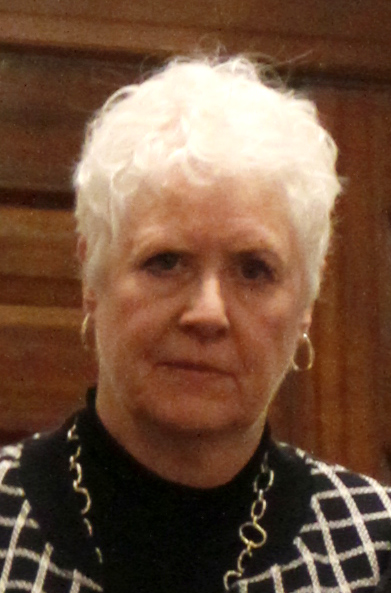

	Majority party	Minority party	Third party
Leader	Cathy Tilton	Louise Stutes (Note: Stutes, a Republican, was elected speaker under a Democratic-led coalition)	—
Party	Republican	Democratic	Independent
Leader since	February 16, 2021	February 11, 2021	—
Leader's seat	26th–Wasilla	32nd–Kodiak	—
Last election	21 seats (Note: Four Republicans joined all Democrats and independents to form a governing coalition), 48.31%	15 seats, 32.29%	4 seats, 14.80%
Seats before	21	15	4
Seats won	21	13 (Note: Two Democrats and two independents joined the new Republican-led coalition)	6
Seat change	Steady	▼2	▲2
Popular vote	134,545	66,613	31,862
Percentage	56.21%	27.83%	13.31%
Swing	▲7.90%	▼4.46%	▼1.49%
- Results: Republican hold Republican gain Democratic hold Democratic gain Independent hold Independent gain Coalition Republican hold Independent Republican hold
Speaker before election
Louise Stutes
Republican (Coalition)
Elected Speaker
Cathy Tilton
Republican (Coalition)

The 2022 Alaska House of Representatives elections were held on Tuesday, November 8, 2022, with the primary election on August 16, 2022. Voters in the 40 districts of the Alaska House of Representatives elected their representatives, in conjunction with state senate elections and the biennial United States elections for federal offices.

== Background ==
In 2020, Alaskan voters approved Ballot Measure 2, an initiative to implement a nonpartisan blanket top-four primary with a single, open primary where candidates from all parties are listed on the ballot and the top four vote getters advance to the general election. The general election is then resolved using instant-runoff voting, where voters rank the candidates and the candidates receiving the lowest votes are eliminated one by one until one candidate has a majority. The first elections using the new system will be the 2022 election cycle. As of the close of candidate filing, only one election for the Alaska House of Representatives had more than four candidates.

== Predictions ==
Source	Ranking	As of
Sabato's Crystal Ball	Lean R (flip)	May 19, 2022

== Overview ==
=== Primary elections ===
2022 Alaska State House of Representatives election Primary election – August 16, 2022
Party	Votes	%	Candidates	Advanced to general	Seats contested
Republican	94,494	57.40%	52	52	32
Democratic	46,184	28.05%	26	26	22
Independent	21,315	12.95%	14	14	12
Libertarian	1,282	0.78%	3	3	3
Alaska Independence	1,115	0.68%	2	2	2
Constitution	233	0.14%	2	1	1
Totals	164,623	100.00%	99	98	—

=== General election ===
Eight candidates withdrew from the general election after advancing from the primary. In District 35, Independent Tim Parker withdrew and was replaced on the general election ballot by Kieran Brown of the Constitution Party.

2022 Alaska House of Representatives elections General election – November 8, 2022
Party	Round 1		Max Round		Candidates	Before	After	±
Party	Votes	%	Votes	%	Candidates	Before	After	±
Republican	136,126	56.13%	134,545	56.21%	50	21	21	Steady
Democratic	67,998	28.04%	66,613	27.83%	25	15	13	▼2
Independent (Note: Includes candidates with a party affiliation of "Non-partisan" or "Undeclared")	31,773	13.10%	31,862	13.31%	11	4	6	▲2
Libertarian	1,787	0.73%	1,787	0.75%	3	0	0	Steady
Alaska Independence	1,766	0.73%	1,766	0.74%	1	0	0	Steady
Constitution	231	0.09%	231	0.10%	1	0	0	Steady
Write-ins	2,850	1.18%	2,557	1.07%	—	0	0	Steady
Totals	242,531	100.00%	239,361	100.00%	91	40	40	

First choice vote
Republican	56.13%
Democratic	28.04%
Independent	13.10%
Write-in	1.66%
Libertarian	0.73%
AK Independence	0.73%
Constitution	0.09%

Seats
Republican	52.5%
Democratic	32.5%
Independent	15.0%

== Results ==
District	Incumbent	Party	Elected representative	Party
1	Dan Ortiz	Ind	Dan Ortiz	Ind
2	Jonathan Kreiss-Tomkins	Dem	Rebecca Himschoot	Ind
3	Andi Story	Dem	Andi Story	Dem
4	Sara Hannan	Dem	Sara Hannan	Dem
5	Louise Stutes	Coal. Rep	Louise Stutes	Coal. Rep
6	Sarah Vance	Rep	Sarah Vance	Rep
7	Ron Gillham	Rep	Justin Ruffridge	Rep
8	Ben Carpenter	Rep	Ben Carpenter	Rep
9	Laddie Shaw	Rep	Laddie Shaw	Rep
10			Craig Johnson	Rep
11			Julie Coulombe	Rep
12	Calvin Schrage	Ind	Calvin Schrage	Ind
13	Andy Josephson	Dem	Andy Josephson	Dem
13	Chris Tuck	Dem	Andy Josephson	Dem
14			Alyse Galvin	Ind
15	Tom McKay	Rep	Tom McKay	Rep
16	Matt Claman	Dem	Jennie Armstrong	Dem
17	Harriet Drummond	Dem	Zack Fields	Dem
17	Zack Fields	Dem	Zack Fields	Dem
18	David Nelson	Rep	Cliff Groh	Dem
19	Geran Tarr	Dem	Genevieve Mina	Dem
20	Ivy Spohnholz	Dem	Andrew Gray	Dem
21	Liz Snyder	Dem	Donna Mears	Dem
22	Sara Rasmussen	Ind. Rep	Stanley Wright	Rep
23	Kelly Merrick	Coal. Rep	Jamie Allard	Rep
24	Ken McCarty	Rep	Dan Saddler	Rep
25	DeLena Johnson	Rep	DeLena Johnson	Rep
26	Cathy Tilton	Rep	Cathy Tilton	Rep
27	David Eastman	Ind. Rep	David Eastman	Ind. Rep
27	Christopher Kurka	Rep	David Eastman	Ind. Rep
28	James Kaufman	Rep	Jesse Sumner	Rep
29	George Rauscher	Rep	George Rauscher	Rep
30	Kevin McCabe	Rep	Kevin McCabe	Rep
31	Bart LeBon	Rep	Maxine Dibert	Dem
32	Steve Thompson	Rep	William Stapp	Rep
33	Mike Prax	Rep	Mike Prax	Rep
34	Grier Hopkins	Dem	Frank Tomaszewski	Rep
35	Adam Wool	Dem	Ashley Carrick	Dem
36	Mike Cronk	Rep	Mike Cronk	Rep
37	Bryce Edgmon	Ind	Bryce Edgmon	Ind
38	Tiffany Zulkosky	Dem	Conrad McCormick	Dem
39	Neal Foster	Dem	Neal Foster	Dem
40	Josiah Patkotak	Ind	Josiah Patkotak	Ind

== Retiring incumbents ==
- District 2: Steve Thompson (R)
- District 13: Chris Tuck (D)
- District 14: Kelly Merrick (Coalition R) (ran for state senate)
- District 16: Ivy Spohnholz (D)
- District 19: Geran Tarr (D) (ran for state senate)
- District 21: Matt Claman (D) (ran for state senate)
- District 22: Sara Rasmussen (Independent R)
- District 24: Ken McCarty (R) (ran for state senate)
- District 27: Christopher Kurka (R) (ran for governor)
- District 27: Liz Snyder (D)
- District 28: James Kaufman (R) (ran for state senate)
- District 35: Jonathan Kreiss-Tomkins (D)
- District 35: Adam Wool (D) (ran for U.S. House)
- District 38: Tiffany Zulkosky (D)

== Detailed results ==
=== District 1 ===
Primary

Nonpartisan primary
Party	Candidate	Votes	%
Independent	Dan Ortiz (incumbent)	2,174	52.4
Republican	Jeremy Bynum	1,812	43.7
Independent	Shevaun Meggitt (withdrew)	162	3.9
Total votes		4,148	100.0

General election

2022 Alaska House of Representatives election, District 1
Party	Candidate	Votes	%
Independent	Dan Ortiz (incumbent)	3,513	52.4
Republican	Jeremy Bynum	3,170	47.3
Write-in	Write-ins	16	0.2
Total votes		6,699	100.0
Independent hold			
Coalition hold			

=== District 2 ===
Primary

Nonpartisan primary
Party	Candidate	Votes	%
Independent	Rebecca Himschoot	2,387	54.2
Republican	Kenny Skaflestad	2,014	45.8
Total votes		4,401	100.0

General election
Himschoot said she planned on joining the bipartisan coalition if elected.

2022 Alaska House of Representatives election, District 2
Party	Candidate	Votes	%
Independent	Rebecca Himschoot	4,151	58.3
Republican	Kenny Skaflestad	2,942	41.3
Write-in	Write-ins	26	0.4
Total votes		7,119	100.0
Independent gain from Republican			

=== District 3 ===
Primary

Nonpartisan primary
Party	Candidate	Votes	%
Democratic	Andi Story (incumbent)	4,374	100.0
Total votes		4,374	100.0

General election

2022 Alaska House of Representatives election, District 3
Party	Candidate	Votes	%
Democratic	Andi Story (incumbent)	6,352	95.4
Write-in	Write-ins	303	4.6
Total votes		6,655	100.0
Democratic hold			
Coalition hold			

=== District 4 ===
Primary

Nonpartisan primary
Party	Candidate	Votes	%
Democratic	Sara Hannan (incumbent)	3,926	82.5
Independent	Darrell Harmon	832	17.5
Total votes		4,758	100.0

General election

2022 Alaska House of Representatives election, District 4
Party	Candidate	Votes	%
Democratic	Sara Hannan (incumbent)	5,432	79.1
Independent	Darrell Harmon	1,345	19.6
Write-in	Write-ins	87	1.3
Total votes		6,864	100.0

=== District 5 ===
Primary

Nonpartisan primary
Party	Candidate	Votes	%
Coalition Republican	Louise Stutes (incumbent)	2,282	65.8
Republican	Benjamin Vincent	1,185	34.2
Total votes		3,467	100.0

General election

2022 Alaska House of Representatives election, District 5
Party	Candidate	Votes	%
Coalition Republican	Louise Stutes (incumbent)	3,276	60.9
Republican	Benjamin Vincent	2,071	38.5
Write-in	Write-ins	29	0.5
Total votes		5,376	100.0
Coalition Republican hold			

=== District 6 ===
Primary

Nonpartisan primary
Party	Candidate	Votes	%
Republican	Sarah Vance (incumbent)	3,659	51.9
Independent	Louie Flora	2,823	40.0
Independent	Ginger Bryant	570	8.1
Total votes		7,052	100.0

General election

2022 Alaska House of Representatives election, District 6
Party	Candidate	Votes	%
Republican	Sarah Vance (incumbent)	4,958	52.1
Independent	Louie Flora	4,188	44.0
Independent	Ginger Bryant	346	3.6
Write-in	Write-ins	21	0.2
Total votes		9,513	100.0

=== District 7 ===
Primary

Nonpartisan primary
Party	Candidate	Votes	%
Republican	Justin Ruffridge	2,682	56.8
Republican	Ron Gillham (incumbent)	2,040	43.2
Total votes		4,722	100.0

General election

2022 Alaska House of Representatives election, District 7
Party	Candidate	Votes	%
Republican	Justin Ruffridge	3,606	52.6
Republican	Ron Gillham (incumbent)	3,188	46.5
Write-in	Write-ins	61	0.9
Total votes		6,855	100.0

=== District 8 ===
Primary

Nonpartisan primary
Party	Candidate	Votes	%
Republican	Ben Carpenter (incumbent)	4,555	100.0
Total votes		4,555	100.0

General election

2022 Alaska House of Representatives election, District 8
Party	Candidate	Votes	%
Republican	Ben Carpenter (incumbent)	6,907	96.6
Write-in	Write-ins	243	3.4
Total votes		7,150	100.0
Republican hold			

=== District 9 ===
Primary

Nonpartisan primary
Party	Candidate	Votes	%
Republican	Laddie Shaw (incumbent)	4,112	54.6
Democratic	David Schaff	3,420	45.4
Total votes		7,532	100.0

General election

2022 Alaska House of Representatives election, District 9
Party	Candidate	Votes	%
Republican	Laddie Shaw (incumbent)	5,320	54.2
Democratic	David Schaff	4,480	45.6
Write-in	Write-ins	21	0.2
Total votes		9,821	100.0

=== District 10 ===
Primary

Nonpartisan primary
Party	Candidate	Votes	%
Republican	Craig Johnson	2,396	49.5
Democratic	Sue Levi (withdrew)	1,135	23.4
Democratic	Caroline Storm	1,090	22.5
Libertarian	Mikel Insalaco	223	4.6
Total votes		4,844	100.0

General election
Sue Levi withdrew after the primary.

2022 Alaska House of Representatives election, District 10
Party	Candidate	Votes	%
Republican	Craig Johnson	3,499	51.5
Democratic	Caroline Storm	2,902	42.7
Libertarian	Mikel Insalaco	349	5.1
Write-in	Write-ins	42	0.6
Total votes		6,792	100.0

=== District 11 ===
Primary

Nonpartisan primary
Party	Candidate	Votes	%
Republican	Julie Coulombe	2,335	43.7
Independent	Walter Featherly	2,079	38.9
Republican	Ross Bieling	925	17.3
Total votes		5,339	100.0

General election
Featherly expressed willingness to join a bipartisan coalition if he won.

2022 Alaska House of Representatives election, District 11
Party	Candidate	First choice			Round 1			Round 2	
Party	Candidate	Votes	%	Transfer	Votes	%	Transfer	Votes	%
Republican	Julie Coulombe	2,952	38.6	49	3,001	39.1	+676	3,677	50.8
Independent	Walter Featherly	3,476	45.5	8	3,484	45.4	+81	3,565	49.2
Republican	Ross Bieling	1,177	15.4	9	1,186	15.5	-1,186	Eliminated	
Write-in		40	0.5	-40	Eliminated				
Total votes		7,645			7,671			7,242	
Blank or inactive ballots					519		+429	948	

=== District 12 ===
Primary

Nonpartisan primary
Party	Candidate	Votes	%
Independent	Calvin Schrage (incumbent)	2,554	57.2
Republican	Jay McDonald	1,911	42.8
Total votes		4,465	100.0

General election

2022 Alaska House of Representatives election, District 12
Party	Candidate	Votes	%
Independent	Calvin Schrage (incumbent)	3,820	59.0
Republican	Jay McDonald	2,652	40.9
Write-in	Write-ins	5	0.1
Total votes		6,477	100.0

=== District 13 ===
Primary

Nonpartisan primary
Party	Candidate	Votes	%
Republican	Kathy Henslee	1,782	46.8
Democratic	Andy Josephson (incumbent)	1,781	46.8
Independence	Timothy Huit (withdrew)	244	6.4
Total votes		3,807	100.0

General election

2022 Alaska House of Representatives election, District 13
Party	Candidate	Votes	%
Democratic	Andy Josephson (incumbent)	2,901	52.5
Republican	Kathy Henslee	2,619	47.4
Write-in	Write-ins	8	0.1
Total votes		5,528	100.0

=== District 14 ===
Primary

Nonpartisan primary
Party	Candidate	Votes	%
Independent	Alyse Galvin	2,760	67.5
Republican	Nicholas Danger	1,328	32.5
Total votes		4,088	100.0

General election
Galvin said she would join the bipartisan coalition if elected.

2022 Alaska House of Representatives election, District 14
Party	Candidate	Votes	%
Independent	Alyse Galvin	3,803	66.9
Republican	Nicholas Danger	1,854	32.6
Write-in	Write-ins	28	0.5
Total votes		5,685	100

=== District 15 ===
Primary

Nonpartisan primary
Party	Candidate	Votes	%
Republican	Tom McKay (incumbent)	2,339	44.3
Democratic	Denny Wells	2,333	44.2
Republican	David Eibeck	605	11.5
Total votes		5,277	100.0

General election

2022 Alaska House of Representatives election, District 15
Party	Candidate	First choice			Round 1			Round 2	
Party	Candidate	Votes	%	Transfer	Votes	%	Transfer	Votes	%
Republican	Tom McKay (incumbent)	2,812	38.8	+28	2,840	39.1	+645	3,485	50.1
Democratic	Denny Wells	3,379	46.6	+6	3,385	46.6	+91	3,476	49.9
Republican	David Eibeck	1,026	14.2	+14	1,040	14.3	-1,040	Eliminated	
Write-in		36	0.5	-36	Eliminated				
Total votes		7,253			7,262			6,959	
Blank or inactive ballots					274		+304	578	

=== District 16 ===
Primary

Nonpartisan primary
Party	Candidate	Votes	%
Democratic	Jennie Armstrong	3,107	53.2
Republican	Liz Vazquez	2,012	34.5
Republican	Joel McKinney (withdrew)	590	10.1
Constitution	Rick Beckes (withdrew)	127	2.2
Total votes		5,836	100.0

General election

2022 Alaska House of Representatives election, District 16
Party	Candidate	Votes	%
Democratic	Jennie Armstrong	4,237	55.1
Republican	Liz Vazquez	3,432	44.6
Write-in	Write-ins	24	0.3
Total votes		7,693	100.0

=== District 17 ===
Primary

Nonpartisan primary
Party	Candidate	Votes	%
Democratic	Zack Fields (incumbent)	1,988	51.2
Democratic	Harriet Drummond (incumbent)	1,897	48.8
Total votes		3,885	100.0

General election

2022 Alaska House of Representatives election, District 17
Party	Candidate	Votes	%
Democratic	Zack Fields (incumbent)	3,015	55.7
Democratic	Harriet Drummond (incumbent)	2,258	41.7
Write-in	Write-ins	137	2.5
Total votes		5,410	100.0

=== District 18 ===
Primary

Nonpartisan primary
Party	Candidate	Votes	%
Republican	David Nelson (incumbent)	480	40.8
Democratic	Cliff Groh	447	38.0
Democratic	Lyn Franks	250	21.2
Total votes		1,177	100.0

General election

2022 Alaska House of Representatives election, District 18
Party	Candidate	First choice			Round 1			Round 2	
Party	Candidate	Votes	%	Transfer	Votes	%	Transfer	Votes	%
Democratic	Cliff Groh	743	35.3	+3	746	35.2	+299	1,045	51.9
Republican	David Nelson (incumbent)	927	44.0	0	927	43.8	+41	968	48.1
Democratic	Lyn Franks	426	20.2	+18	444	21.0	-444	Eliminated	
Write-in		9	0.4	-9	Eliminated				
Total votes		2,105			2,117			2,013	
Blank or inactive ballots					180		+104	284	

=== District 19 ===
Primary

Nonpartisan primary
Party	Candidate	Votes	%
Democratic	Genevieve Mina	1,516	77.1
Democratic	Russell Wyatt	451	22.9
Total votes		1,967	100.0

General election

2022 Alaska House of Representatives election, District 19
Party	Candidate	Votes	%
Democratic	Genevieve Mina	2,245	74.1
Democratic	Russell Wyatt	669	22.1
Write-in	Write-ins	117	3.9
Total votes		3,031	100.0

=== District 20 ===
Primary

Nonpartisan primary
Party	Candidate	Votes	%
Democratic	Andrew Gray	1,816	52.3
Republican	Paul Bauer	1,272	36.6
Libertarian	Scott Kohlhaas	200	5.8
Republican	Jordan Harary	186	5.4
Total votes		3,474	100.0

General election

2022 Alaska House of Representatives election, District 20
Party	Candidate	Votes	%
Democratic	Andrew Gray	2,683	54.3
Republican	Paul Bauer	1,277	25.8
Republican	Jordan Harary	742	15.0
Libertarian	Scott Kohlhaas	212	4.3
Write-in	Write-ins	30	0.6
Total votes		4,944	100.0

=== District 21 ===
Primary

Nonpartisan primary
Party	Candidate	Votes	%
Democratic	Donna Mears	2,345	47.9
Republican	Forrest Wolfe	2,302	47.0
Independent	Ian Sharrock (withdrew)	253	5.2
Total votes		4,900	100.0

General election

2022 Alaska House of Representatives election, District 21
Party	Candidate	Votes	%
Democratic	Donna Mears	3,574	51.0
Republican	Forrest Wolfe	3,424	48.8
Write-in	Write-ins	15	0.2
Total votes		7,013	100.0

=== District 22 ===
Primary

Nonpartisan primary
Party	Candidate	Votes	%
Democratic	Ted Eischeid	984	43.1
Republican	Stanley Wright	804	35.2
Republican	Lisa Simpson (withdrew)	496	21.7
Total votes		2,284	100.0

General election

2022 Alaska House of Representatives election, District 22
Party	Candidate	Votes	%
Republican	Stanley Wright	1,915	50.8
Democratic	Ted Eischeid	1,843	48.9
Write-in	Write-ins	14	0.4
Total votes		3,772	100.0

=== District 23 ===
Primary

Nonpartisan primary
Party	Candidate	Votes	%
Republican	Jamie Allard	2,864	56.8
Republican	Roger Branson	2,178	43.2
Total votes		5,042	100.0

General election

2022 Alaska House of Representatives election, District 23
Party	Candidate	Votes	%
Republican	Jamie Allard	4,468	61.5
Republican	Roger Branson	2,675	36.8
Write-in	Write-ins	118	1.6
Total votes		7,261	100.0

=== District 24 ===
Primary

Nonpartisan primary
Party	Candidate	Votes	%
Republican	Dan Saddler	2,919	53.1
Republican	Sharon Jackson	1,365	24.8
Democratic	Daryl Nelson	1,211	22.0
Total votes		5,495	100.0

General election

2022 Alaska House of Representatives election, District 24
Party	Candidate	Votes	%
Republican	Dan Saddler	3,926	52.6
Republican	Sharon Jackson	1,865	25.0
Democratic	Daryl Nelson	1,613	21.6
Write-in	Write-ins	57	0.8
Total votes		7,461	100.0

=== District 25 ===
Primary

Nonpartisan primary
Party	Candidate	Votes	%
Republican	DeLena Johnson (incumbent)	3,590	70.8
Republican	Lawrence Wood	1,478	29.2
Total votes		5,068	100.0

General election

2022 Alaska House of Representatives election, District 25
Party	Candidate	Votes	%
Republican	DeLena Johnson (incumbent)	5,675	77.8
Republican	Lawrence Wood	1,515	20.8
Write-in	Write-ins	104	1.4
Total votes		7,294	100.0

=== District 26 ===
Primary

Nonpartisan primary
Party	Candidate	Votes	%
Republican	Cathy Tilton (incumbent)	3,558	80.6
Libertarian	Daniel Stokes	859	19.4
Total votes		4,417	100.0

General election

2022 Alaska House of Representatives election, District 26
Party	Candidate	Votes	%
Republican	Cathy Tilton (incumbent)	5,352	80.8
Libertarian	Daniel Stokes	1,226	18.5
Write-in	Write-ins	45	0.7
Total votes		6,623	100.0

=== District 27 ===
Primary

Nonpartisan primary
Party	Candidate	Votes	%
Independent Republican	David Eastman (incumbent)	1,931	52.1
Republican	Stu Graham	974	26.3
Republican	Brendan Carpenter	804	21.7
Total votes		3,709	100.0

General election

2022 Alaska House of Representatives election, District 27
Party	Candidate	Votes	%
Independent Republican	David Eastman (incumbent)	2,856	51.3
Republican	Stu Graham	1,505	27.0
Republican	Brendan Carpenter	1,102	19.8
Write-in	Write-ins	101	1.8
Total votes		5,564	100.0

=== District 28 ===
Primary

Nonpartisan primary
Party	Candidate	Votes	%
Republican	Steve Menard	1,401	33.9
Republican	Jesse Sumner	1,364	33.0
Republican	Jessica Wright	738	17.9
Republican	Rachel Allen	628	15.2
Total votes		4,131	100.0

General election

2022 Alaska House of Representatives election, District 28
Party	Candidate	First choice			Round 1			Round 2			Round 3	
Party	Candidate	Votes	%	Transfer	Votes	%	Transfer	Votes	%	Transfer	Votes	%
Republican	Jesse Sumner	2,168	36.6	+49	2,217	37.3	+201	2,418	43.0	+702	3,120	61.7
Republican	Steve Menard	1,523	25.7	+52	1,575	26.5	+146	1,721	30.6	+215	1,936	38.3
Republican	Rachel Allen	1,273	21.5	+14	1,287	21.7	+204	1,491	26.5	-1,491	Eliminated	
Republican	Jessica Wright	853	14.4	+10	863	14.5	-863	Eliminated				
Write-in		107	1.8	-107	Eliminated							
Total votes		5,924			5,942			5,630			5,056	
Blank or inactive ballots					1,156		+312	1,468		+574	2,042	

=== District 29 ===
Primary

Nonpartisan primary
Party	Candidate	Votes	%
Republican	George Rauscher (incumbent)	3,624	74.0
Independent	Elijah Haase	1,275	26.0
Total votes		4,899	100.0

General election

2022 Alaska House of Representatives election, District 29
Party	Candidate	Votes	%
Republican	George Rauscher (incumbent)	5,550	74.1
Independent	Elijah Haase	1,890	25.3
Write-in	Write-ins	45	0.6
Total votes		7,485	100.0

=== District 30 ===
Primary

Nonpartisan primary
Party	Candidate	Votes	%
Republican	Kevin J. McCabe (incumbent)	2,463	47.4
Republican	Doyle Holmes	1,451	27.9
Democratic	Joy Mindiola	1,284	24.7
Total votes		5,198	100.0

General election

2022 Alaska House of Representatives election, District 30
Party	Candidate	First choice			Round 1			Round 2	
Party	Candidate	Votes	%	Transfer	Votes	%	Transfer	Votes	%
Republican	Kevin McCabe (incumbent)	3,391	45.0	+3	3,394	45.1	+268	3,662	55.9
Republican	Doyle Holmes	2,595	34.4	+13	2,608	34.7	+276	2,884	44.1
Democratic	Joy Mindiola	1,506	20.0	+11	1,517	20.2	-1,517	Eliminated	
Write-in		46	0.6	-46	Eliminated				
Total votes		7,538			7,519			6,546	
Blank or inactive ballots					616		+973	1,589	

=== District 31 ===
Primary

Nonpartisan primary
Party	Candidate	Votes	%
Republican	Bart LeBon (incumbent)	1,280	37.9
Democratic	Maxine Dibert	1,257	37.2
Republican	Kelly Nash	838	24.8
Total votes		3,375	100.0

General election

2022 Alaska House of Representatives election, District 31
Party	Candidate	First choice			Round 1			Round 2	
Party	Candidate	Votes	%	Transfer	Votes	%	Transfer	Votes	%
Democratic	Maxine Dibert	2,469	49.1	+9	2,478	49.0	+111	2,589	55.5
Republican	Bart LeBon (incumbent)	1,479	29.4	+13	1,492	29.5	+582	2,074	44.5
Republican	Kelly Nash	1,040	20.7	+52	1,092	21.6	-1,092	Eliminated	
Write-in		39	0.8	-39	Eliminated				
Total votes		5,027			5,062			4,663	
Blank or inactive ballots					268		+399	667	

=== District 32 ===
Primary

Nonpartisan primary
Party	Candidate	Votes	%
Republican	William Stapp	926	47.1
Democratic	Van Lawrence	645	32.8
Republican	Timothy Givens	393	20.0
Total votes		1,964	100.0

General election

2022 Alaska House of Representatives election, District 32
Party	Candidate	Votes	%
Republican	William Stapp	1,630	51.5
Democratic	Van Lawrence	1,026	32.4
Republican	Timothy Givens	488	15.4
Write-in	Write-ins	19	0.6
Total votes		3,163	100.0

=== District 33 ===
Primary

Nonpartisan primary
Party	Candidate	Votes	%
Republican	Mike Prax (incumbent)	3,194	100.0
Total votes		3,194	100.0

General election

2022 Alaska House of Representatives election, District 33
Party	Candidate	Votes	%
Republican	Mike Prax (incumbent)	5,199	97.5
Write-in	Write-ins	133	2.5
Total votes		5,332	100.0
Republican hold			

=== District 34 ===
Primary

Nonpartisan primary
Party	Candidate	Votes	%
Democratic	Grier Hopkins (incumbent)	2,340	44.6
Republican	Frank Tomaszewski	2,166	41.3
Republican	Nate DeMars	738	14.1
Total votes		5,244	100.0

General election

2022 Alaska House of Representatives election, District 34
Party	Candidate	First choice			Round 1			Round 2	
Party	Candidate	Votes	%	Transfer	Votes	%	Transfer	Votes	%
Republican	Frank Tomaszewski	3,607	48.9	+8	3,615	49.0	+398	4,013	55.6
Democratic	Grier Hopkins (incumbent)	3,172	43.0	+3	3,175	43.1	+25	3,200	44.4
Republican	Nate DeMars	575	7.8	+11	586	7.9	-586	Eliminated	
Write-in		16	0.2	-16	Eliminated				
Total votes		7,370			7,376			7,213	
Blank or inactive ballots					317		+163	480	

=== District 35 ===
Primary

Nonpartisan primary
Party	Candidate	Votes	%
Democratic	Ashley Carrick	2,165	41.0
Republican	Kevin McKinley	1,454	27.6
Independent	Tim Parker (withdrew)	931	17.6
Republican	Ruben McNeill Jr.	621	11.8
Constitution	Kieran Brown	106	2.0
Total votes		5,277	100.0

Tim Parker withdrew from the race after the primary, which allowed Kieran Brown to advance to the general election.

General election

2022 Alaska House of Representatives election, District 35
Party	Candidate	Votes	%
Democratic	Ashley Carrick	3,977	53.5
Republican	Kevin McKinley	2,093	28.2
Republican	Ruben McNeill Jr.	1,098	14.8
Constitution	Kieran Brown	231	3.1
Write-in	Write-ins	34	0.5
Total votes		7,433	100.0

=== District 36 ===
2022 Alaska's 36th house district election
- November 8, 2022
Nominee	Mike Cronk	Fitch Fowler
Party	Republican	Democratic
Popular vote	4,879	2,551
Percentage	65.4%	34.2%
- Precinct results Cronk: 50–60% 60–70% 70–80% 80–90% >90% Fowler: 50–60% 60–70% 70–80% 80–90% >90%
State representative before election
Mike Cronk
Republican
Elected state representative
Mike Cronk
Republican

Primary

Nonpartisan primary
Party	Candidate	Votes	%
Republican	Mike Cronk (incumbent)	3,450	66.1
Democratic	Fitch Fowler	1,767	33.9
Total votes		5,217	100.0

General election

2022 Alaska House of Representatives election, District 36
Party	Candidate	Votes	%
Republican	Mike Cronk (incumbent)	4,879	65.4
Democratic	Fitch Fowler	2,551	34.2
Write-in	Write-ins	34	0.5
Total votes		7,464	100.0

=== District 37 ===
Primary

Nonpartisan primary
Party	Candidate	Votes	%
Independent	Bryce Edgmon (incumbent)	1,598	100.0
Total votes		1,598	100.0

General election

2022 Alaska House of Representatives election, District 37
Party	Candidate	Votes	%
Independent	Bryce Edgmon (incumbent)	2,883	96.8
Write-in	Write-ins	95	3.2
Total votes		2,978	100.0
Independent hold			
Coalition hold			

=== District 38 ===
Primary

Nonpartisan primary
Party	Candidate	Votes	%
Democratic	C.J. McCormick	1,550	100.0
Total votes		1,550	100.0

General election

2022 Alaska House of Representatives election, District 38
Party	Candidate	Votes	%
Democratic	C. J. McCormick	2,687	85.2
Write-in	Write-ins	468	14.8
Total votes		3,155	100.0
Democratic hold			
Coalition hold			

=== District 39 ===
==== Primary ====
2022 Alaska's 39th house district election
- November 8, 2022
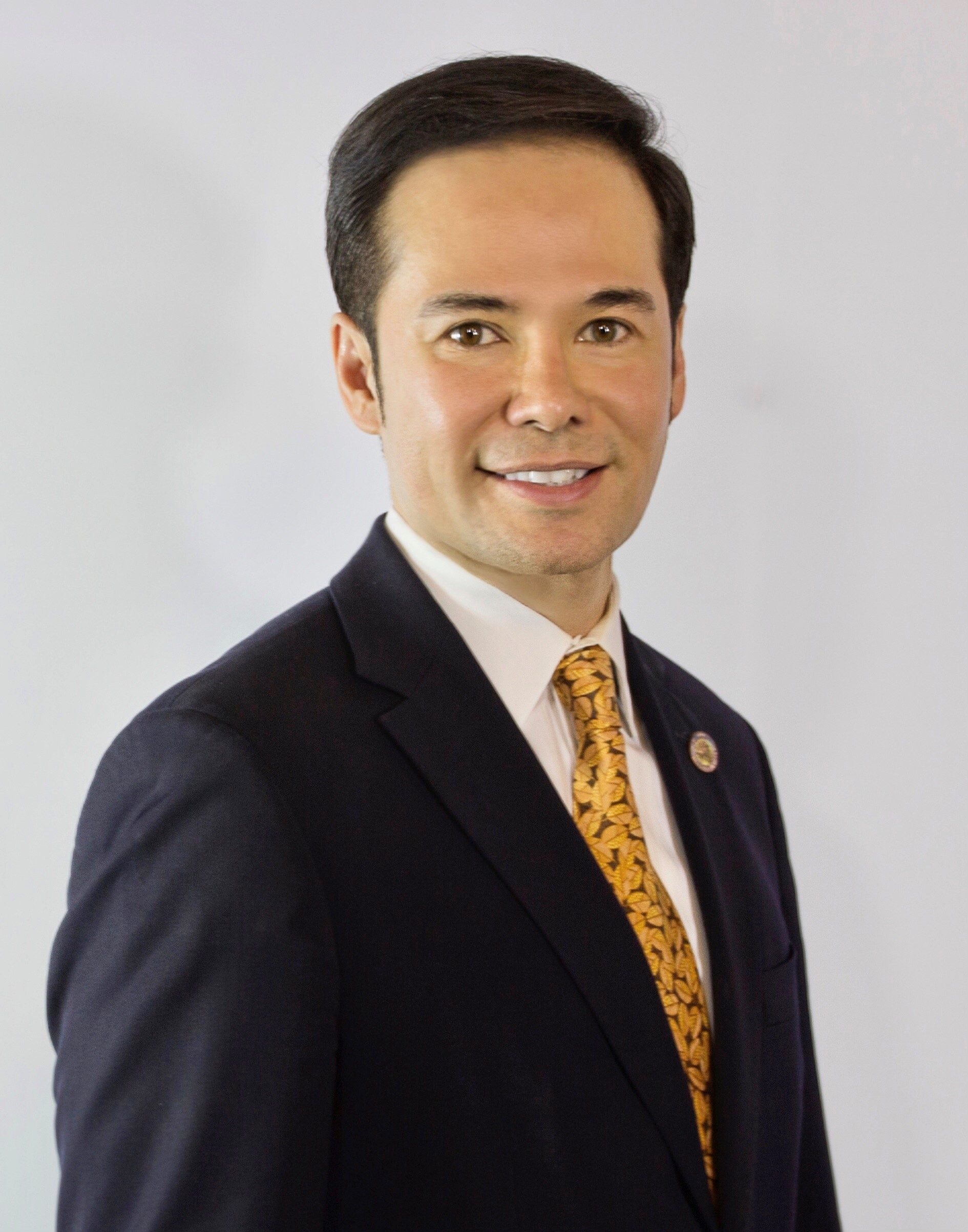
Nominee	Neal Foster	Tyler Ivanoff
Party	Democratic	Independence
Popular vote	1,858	1,766
Percentage	50.9%	48.4%
- Precinct results Foster: 50-60% 60-70% 70-80% >90% Ivanoff: 50-60% 60-70% 70-80% 80-90%
Representative before election
Neal Foster
Democratic
Elected Representative
Neal Foster
Democratic

Nonpartisan primary
Party	Candidate	Votes	%
Democratic	Neal Foster (incumbent)	1,105	55.9
Independence	Tyler Ivanoff	871	44.1
Total votes		1,976	100.0

==== General election ====
Ivanoff said he would not join a bipartisan coalition if elected.

2022 Alaska House of Representatives election, District 39
Party	Candidate	Votes	%
Democratic	Neal Foster (incumbent)	1,858	51.0
Independence	Tyler Ivanoff	1,766	48.4
Write-in	Write-ins	23	0.6
Total votes		3,647	100.0

=== District 40 ===
Primary

Nonpartisan primary
Party	Candidate	Votes	%
Independent	Josiah Patkotak (incumbent)	917	100.0
Total votes		917	100.0

General election

2022 Alaska House of Representatives election, District 40
Party	Candidate	Votes	%
Independent	Josiah Patkotak (incumbent)	2,358	97.8
Write-in	Write-ins	54	2.2
Total votes		2,412	100.0
Independent hold			
Coalition hold			

== See also ==
- 2022 United States Senate election in Alaska
- 2022 United States House of Representatives elections in Alaska
- 2022 United States gubernatorial elections
- 2022 United States state legislative elections
- 2022 Alaska Senate election
- 2022 Alaska elections
- List of Alaska State Legislatures
