= Denny Wells =

American politician

Member-elect of the Alaska House of Representatives from the 15th district
- Assuming office January 19, 2027
- Succeeding: Mia Costello

Personal details
- Born: Anchorage, Alaska, U.S.
- Party: Democratic
- Education: University of Alaska Fairbanks
- Website: Official website

Denmer Austin Wells IV is an American politician. A member of the Democratic Party, he was elected to the Alaska House of Representatives in 2026, representing the 15th district. Wells unseated Republican Mia Costello in the 2026 election. He previously challenged her for the seat in 2022 and 2024.

Wells was born in Anchorage, Alaska, and was raised in Fairbanks, Alaska, where he graduated from West Valley High School. Wells earned a bachelor's degree from the University of Alaska Fairbanks. He is a Peace Corps veteran.
