= Evelynn Trefon =

American politician

Member-elect of the Alaska House of Representatives from the 37th district
- Assuming office TBD
- Succeeding: Bryce Edgmon

Personal details
- Born: 1981 or 1982 (age 43–44) Kansas City, Missouri, U.S.
- Party: Democratic
- Spouse: Michael C. Trefon
- Children: 1
- Education: Johnson County Community College; University of Alaska Anchorage

Evelynn M. Trefon (1981/1982) is an American politician from Alaska. She is a member-elect of the Alaska House of Representatives from the 37th district.

== Background ==
Trefon was born in Kansas City, Missouri. She graduated from Olathe North High School followed by Johnson County Community College and the University of Alaska Anchorage, where she earned a degree in air traffic control.

She lived in Anchorage from 2005 to 2011 and has resided in Newhalen, her husband's hometown, since 2011. She was a member of the city council of Newhalen and president of the Newhalen School Local School Advisory Committee.

In the 2026 Alaska House of Representatives election, Trefon was elected to succeed Bryce Edgmon.
