= Alaska's 2nd House of Representatives district =

Alaskan legislative district

Alaska's 2nd State House of Representatives district
Representative
| Rebecca Himschoot; I–Sitka |
since January 17, 2023
- Population (2020): 18,402

Alaska's 2nd House of Representatives district is one of the 40 districts of the Alaska House of Representatives and was created in statehood in 1959. It is currently represented by Rebecca Himschoot. Following redistricting in 2020, the district is currently composed of the cities of Sitka, Petersburg, and Yakutat and had at the 2020 Census a population of 18,402.

== Representatives of District 2 ==
| Representative | Party | Years of Service | Residency | Notes | Ref |
|---|---|---|---|---|---|
| Steve M. Thompson | Republican | 2011–2023 | Fairbanks | | |
| Rebecca Himschoot | Independent | 2023– | Sitka | | |
