= Louise Stutes =

American politician

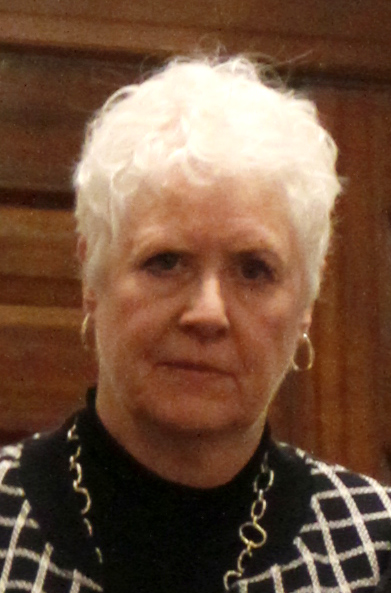

Speaker of the Alaska House of Representatives
- In office February 11, 2021 – January 17, 2023
- Preceded by: Josiah Patkotak (Acting)
- Succeeded by: Cathy Tilton

Member of the Alaska House of Representatives
- Incumbent
- Assumed office January 20, 2015
- Preceded by: Alan Austerman
- Succeeded by: Kathy Simpler (elect)
- Constituency: 32nd district (2015–2023); 5th district (2023–present)

Personal details
- Born: June 30, 1952 (age 74) Seattle, Washington, U.S.
- Party: Republican
- Children: 4
- Education: Shoreline Community College; Kodiak College

Louise Ball Stutes (born July 30, 1952) is an American politician from Alaska. A Republican, Stutes is a member of the Alaska House of Representatives, representing House District 5 on Kodiak Island. She had served as Speaker of the Alaska House of Representatives from 2021 to 2023.

== Career ==
Stutes previously served on the Assembly of the Kodiak Island Borough from 2006 to 2013. As a candidate for the House of Representatives, she was an advocate for the commercial fishing industry and the Alaska Marine Highway.

Stutes defeated primary opponent Carol Austerman, daughter of retiring incumbent Alan Austerman, in August 2014 and went on to beat Jerry McCune of Cordova, the Democratic nominee, in November to win a seat in the legislature.

In 2021, Stutes was elected speaker of the house by a bipartisan, primarily Democratic coalition, succeeding acting speaker and temporary speaker pro tempore Josiah Patkotak, who had succeeded former speaker Bryce Edgmon at the conclusion of the previous session.

Stutes did not seek reelection to the House in 2026, instead running to represent district C in the Alaska Senate. In August 2026, Stutes agreed to pay a $2,643.50 fine and repay $13,869.44 to her campaign to settle complaints regarding improper reporting and spending in her previous three state house campaigns. Stutes acknowledged the violations, saying they were unintentional.

== Personal life ==
Stutes has lived in Kodiak since 1980. Her husband, Stormy, is a commercial fisherman. She has four children. She owned the Village Bar on Kodiak Island for 25 years.

== Electoral history ==
=== 2024 ===
==== Primary ====
2024 Nonpartisan primary
Party	Candidate	Votes	%
Republican	Louise Stutes (incumbent)	1,566	80.4
Libertarian	Leighton Radner	381	19.6
Total votes		1,947	100.0

==== General ====
2024 Alaska House of Representatives election, District 5
Party	Candidate	Votes	%
Republican	Louise Stutes (incumbent)	5,445	77.4
Libertarian	Leighton Radner	1,549	22.0
Write-in		44	0.6
Total votes		7,038	100.0
Republican hold			

Alaska House of Representatives
Preceded by Alan Austerman	Member of the Alaska House of Representatives from the 32nd district (2015–2023) and the 5th district (2023–present); 2015–present	Incumbent
Political offices
Preceded by Josiah Patkotak; Acting	Speaker of the Alaska House of Representatives; 2021–2023	Succeeded by Cathy Tilton
