= Chris Birch (politician) =

American politician (1950–2019)

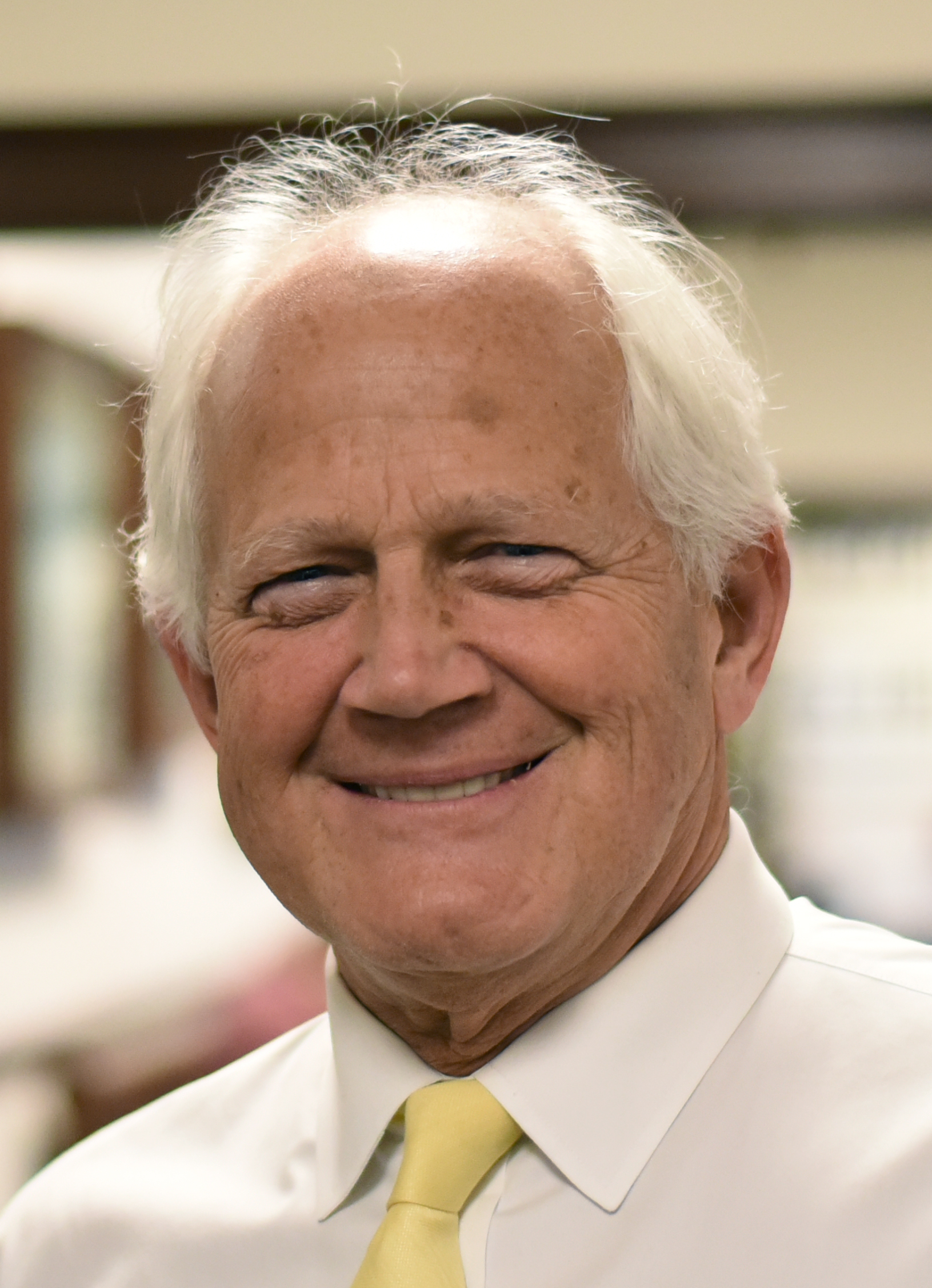
- Chris Birch in a hallway of the Alaska State Capitol in May 2019

Member of the Alaska Senate from the M district
- In office January 15, 2019 – August 7, 2019
- Preceded by: Kevin Meyer
- Succeeded by: Josh Revak

Member of the Alaska House of Representatives from the 26th district
- In office 2017 – January 14, 2019
- Preceded by: Bob Lynn
- Succeeded by: Laddie Shaw

Personal details
- Born: August 28, 1950 Sterling, Illinois, U.S.
- Died: August 7, 2019 (aged 68) Anchorage, Alaska, U.S.
- Party: Republican
- Spouse: Pam (m. 1978)
- Children: 2
- Education: University of Alaska Fairbanks

Christopher Jim Birch (August 28, 1950 – August 7, 2019) was an American politician who served as a member of the Alaska Senate for District M in 2019 and the Alaska House of Representatives for the 26th District from 2017 to 2019. Birch was a member of the Republican Party.

== Early life ==
Birch was born to geologist Bettijeanne Birch and mining engineer Frank Birch in Sterling, Illinois northeast of Moline, Illinois in 1950. His family has a lengthy history in Alaska and he grew up in mining camps near Fairbanks and the Brooks Range in northern Alaska. Birch earned a bachelor's degree in mining engineering from the University of Alaska Fairbanks in 1972 and a Master of Science degree in engineering management in 1979.

== Career ==
Birch served as the chairman of the Chugach Electric Association from 1997 to 2005, worked as the senior engineer of environment and planning for Ted Stevens Anchorage International Airport from 1998 to 2004, and served as the South Anchorage Representative for the Anchorage Assembly from 2005 to 2014. In 2016, he was elected to the Alaska House of Representatives for District 26. In 2018, he ran for the Alaska State Senate for District M and won with 58 percent of the vote. In the Senate, he served as chairman of the Resources Committee. After his death, Governor Mike Dunleavy nominated Representative Laddie Shaw to succeed him but Senate Republicans rejected the nomination.

== Personal life ==
Birch married Pamala Gay Bushey in 1978. They had two children, son Logan Thomas and daughter Talitha "Tali" Ann, and four grandchildren. Tali is a lawyer was formerly married to fellow lawyer and former judge Josh Kindred.

=== Death ===
Birch died from an aortic dissection on August 7, 2019.
