= Rebecca Himschoot =

American politician

Member of the Alaska House of Representatives from the 2nd district
- Incumbent
- Assumed office January 17, 2023
- Preceded by: Steve M. Thompson

Personal details
- Party: Independent

Rebecca Himschoot is an Alaskan politician who currently serves in the Alaska House of Representatives. She received her bachelor's degree in elementary education from the University of Alaska Southeast and her Master of Education from Gonzaga University.

== Electoral history ==
=== Primary 2022 ===
2022 House Primary
Party	Candidate	Votes	%
Independent	Rebecca Himschoot	2,387	54.24

=== General 2022 ===
2022 Alaska House of Representatives election
Party	Candidate	Votes	%
Independent	Rebecca Himschoot	4,151	58.31

=== Primary 2024 ===
2024 House Primary
Party	Candidate	Votes	%
Independent	Rebecca Himschoot (incumbent)	2,141	100.0
Independent hold			

=== General 2024 ===
2024 Alaska House of Representatives election
Party	Candidate	Votes	%
Independent	Rebecca Himschoot (incumbent)	7,060	97.5
Write-in		179	2.5
Total votes		7,239	100.0
Independent hold			

=== Primary 2026 ===
2026 House Primary
Party	Candidate	Votes	%
Independent	Rebecca Himschoot (incumbent)	2,915	69.24
Independent hold			

=== General 2026 ===
2026 Alaska House of Representatives election
Party	Candidate	Votes	%
Independent	Rebecca Himschoot (incumbent)	4,651	60.54
Independent hold			
