= Ron Gillham =

American politician from Alaska

Member of the Alaska House of Representatives from the 30th district
- In office January 11, 2021 – January 17, 2023
- Preceded by: Gary Knopp
- Succeeded by: Kevin J. McCabe

Personal details
- Born: Phoenix, Arizona, U.S.
- Party: Republican

Ron Gillham is an American Republican politician from Alaska. He represented District 30 in the Alaska House of Representatives from 2021 to 2023.

== Electoral history ==
In the 2022 Alaska House of Representatives election Gillham ran in District 7 but was defeated by Justin Ruffridge in the general election.

=== 2024 ===
==== Primary ====
2024 Nonpartisan primary
Party	Candidate	Votes	%
Republican	Justin Ruffridge (incumbent)	1,630	59.7
Republican	Ron Gillham	1,101	40.3
Total votes		2,731	100.0

==== General ====
2024 Alaska House of Representatives election, District 7
Party	Candidate	Votes	%
Republican	Justin Ruffridge (incumbent)	4,985	58.9
Republican	Ron Gillham	3,398	40.2
Write-in		77	0.9
Total votes		8,460	100.0
Republican hold			

== Political positions ==
Gillham endorsed Nick Begich III in the 2022 Alaska's at-large congressional district special election.
