= Thomas McKay (Alaska politician) =

American politician

- McKay in 2023

Member of the Alaska House of Representatives
- In office January 18, 2021 – January 21, 2025
- Preceded by: Chuck Kopp
- Succeeded by: Mia Costello
- Constituency: 24th district (2021–2023); 15th district (2023–2025)

Personal details
- Born: ca. 1959 (age 66–67) Clifton Springs, New York, U.S.
- Party: Republican
- Occupation: Petroleum engineer

Thomas W. McKay (born ca. 1959) is an American Republican politician from Alaska. He represented District 15 as a member of the Alaska House of Representatives.

== Electoral history ==
2024 Alaska Senate primary
Party	Candidate	Votes	%
Democratic	Matt Claman (incumbent)	4,036	60.1
Republican	Thomas McKay (withdrew)	1,393	20.7
Republican	Liz Vazquez	1,287	19.2
Total votes		6,716	100.0
