= Ky Holland =

American politician (born 1962)

Member of the Alaska House of Representatives from the 9th district
- Incumbent
- Assumed office January 21, 2025
- Preceded by: Laddie Shaw

Personal details
- Born: Hezekiah Russel Holland III; 1962 (age 63–64) Anchorage, Alaska, United States
- Party: Independent
- Parent: Hezekiah Holland

Ky Holland (born 1962) is an American politician serving as a member of the Alaska House of Representatives representing district 9. He was elected as an independent in 2024.

== Election results ==
=== District 9 ===
==== Primary ====
2024 Alaska House of Representatives election, District 9 primary
Party	Candidate	Votes	%
Independent	Ky Holland (Note: Listed on the ballot as "Nonpartisan")	1,890	41.9
Republican	Lucy Bauer	936	20.7
Republican	Lee Ellis (withdrew)	875	19.4
Republican	Brandy Pennington (withdrew)	815	18.0
Total votes		4,516	100.0

==== General ====
2024 Alaska House of Representatives election, District 9
Party	Candidate	Votes	%
Independent	Ky Holland	6,079	54.3
Republican	Lucy Bauer	5,091	45.5
Write-in		29	0.2
Total votes		11,199	100.0
Independent gain from Republican			
