= Andi Story =

American politician

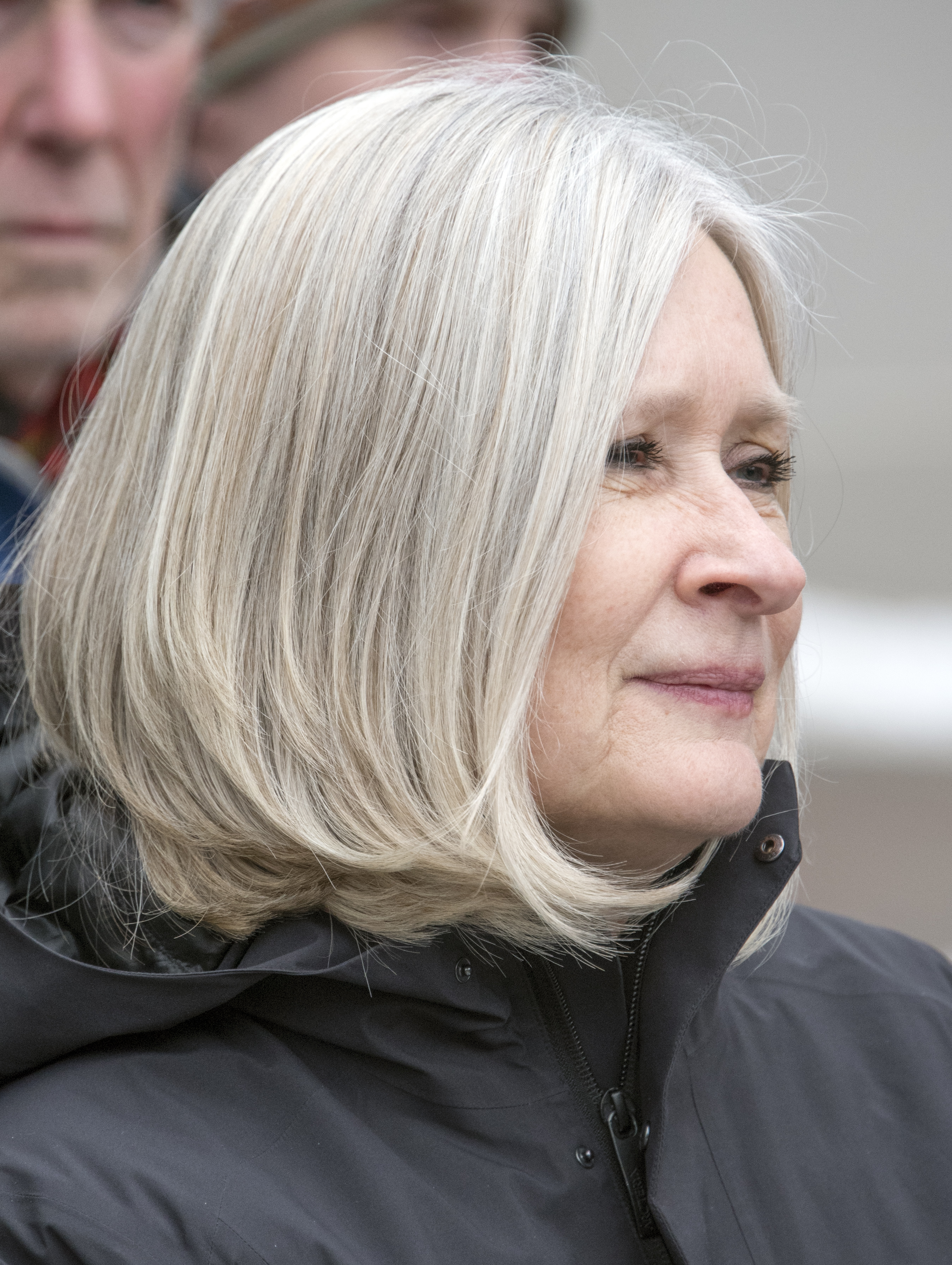

Member of the Alaska House of Representatives
- Incumbent
- Assumed office January 15, 2019
- Preceded by: Justin Parish
- Constituency: 34th district (2019–2023); 3rd district (2023–present)

Personal details
- Born: Olivia, Minnesota, U.S.
- Party: Democratic

Andrea Douglas Story is an American politician who serves in the Alaska House of Representatives from the 3rd district as a member of the Democratic Party. Prior to the state house she was a member of the Juneau School District.

== Early life ==
Andrea Story was born in Olivia, Minnesota. In 1977, she graduated from Detroit Lakes High School. She lived in Juneau, Alaska, from 1982 to 1986, and since 1990. She graduated from Minnesota State University Moorhead with a bachelor's degree in social work in 1982, and from San Diego State University with a master's degree in social work in 1990. She married Mike, with whom she had three children.

== Career ==
From 2003 to 2018, Story was a member of the Juneau Board of Education.

In 2018, Story ran for a seat in the Alaska House of Representatives from the 3rd district. She defeated Robert Edwardson for the Democratic nomination and defeated Republican nominee Jerry Nankervis in the general election. She defeated independent politician Edward M. King in 2020. and faced no opposition in the 2022 and 2024 elections.

During Story's tenure in the state house she has served on the Ways and Means, Fisheries, Tribal Affairs, and Transportation committees. She is the co-chair of the House committee and vice-chair of the State Affairs committee. In 2023, she voted in favor of Cathy Tilton becoming speaker.

== Political positions ==
Story believes that human activities cause climate change. She supports having Juneteenth recognized as a state holiday. In 2025, she voted in favor of a resolution asking President Donald Trump to retain the name of Denali rather than rename it to Mount McKinley.

== Works cited ==
=== Election results ===
- "2018 Election Election" (PDF). Alaska Division of Elections. 2018. Archived (PDF) from the original on June 19, 2025.
- "2018 Primary Election" (PDF). Alaska Division of Elections. 2018. Archived (PDF) from the original on June 19, 2025.
- "2020 Election Election" (PDF). Alaska Division of Elections. 2020. Archived (PDF) from the original on June 19, 2025.
- "2020 Primary Election" (PDF). Alaska Division of Elections. 2020. Archived (PDF) from the original on June 19, 2025.
- "2022 Election Election" (PDF). Alaska Division of Elections. 2022. Archived (PDF) from the original on June 19, 2025.
- "2022 Primary Election" (PDF). Alaska Division of Elections. 2022. Archived (PDF) from the original on June 19, 2025.
- "2024 Election Election" (PDF). Alaska Division of Elections. 2024. Archived (PDF) from the original on June 19, 2025.
- "2024 Primary Election" (PDF). Alaska Division of Elections. 2024. Archived (PDF) from the original on June 19, 2025.

=== News ===
- "Andi Story". KTOO. Archived from the original on June 19, 2025.
- Brooks, James (January 29, 2025). "Pro-Denali resolution picks up more support in Alaska House before advancing to Senate". Alaska Beacon. Archived from the original on June 19, 2025.
- Brooks, James (July 28, 2022). "Q&A with Alaska House District 3 candidate Andi Story". Alaska Beacon. Archived from the original on June 19, 2025.
- Brooks, James (January 18, 2023). "Tilton elected Alaska speaker of the House as rural legislators join Republicans in new coalition". Alaska Beacon. Archived from the original on June 19, 2025.

=== Web ===
- "Andrea Story" (PDF). Alaska Division of Elections. Archived (PDF) from the original on June 19, 2025.
- "Representative Andi Story". Alaska State Legislature. Archived from the original on June 19, 2025.
