= Josiah Patkotak =

American politician(born 1994)

- Aullaqsruaq
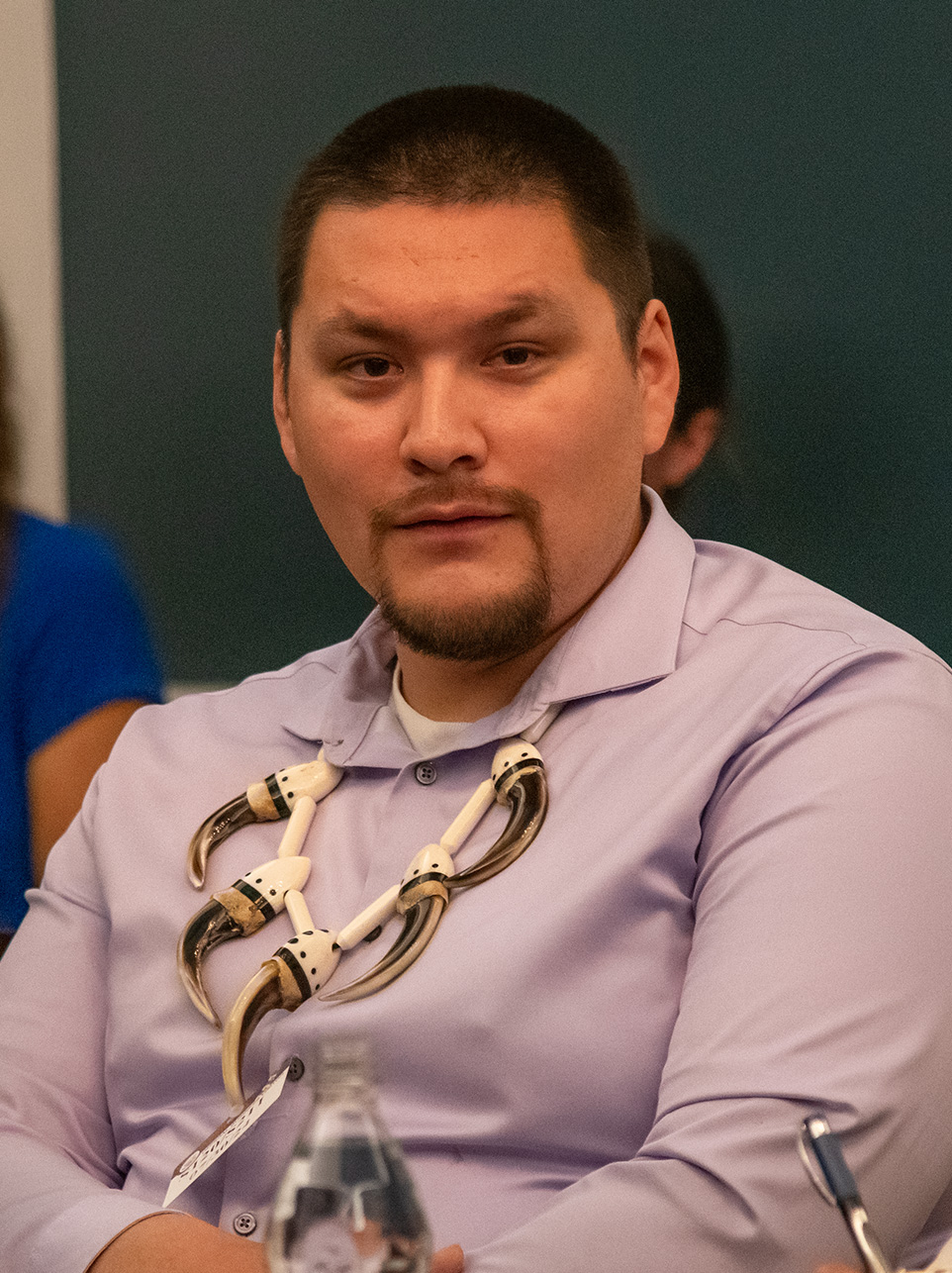
- Patkotak on July 31, 2024

Mayor of North Slope Borough
- Incumbent
- Assumed office October 10, 2023
- Preceded by: Harry Brower

Speaker of the Alaska House of Representatives
- Acting; February 4, 2021 – February 11, 2021
- Preceded by: Bryce Edgmon
- Succeeded by: Louise Stutes

Member of the Alaska House of Representatives from the 40th district
- In office January 11, 2021 – October 10, 2023
- Preceded by: John Lincoln
- Succeeded by: Thomas Baker

Personal details
- Born: March 22, 1994 (age 32) Barrow, Alaska, U.S.
- Party: Independent

Josiah Aullaqsruaq Patkotak (born March 22, 1994) (last name pronounced Patkutaq in Iñupiaq) is an Iñupiaq politician from Alaska. He also played the lead role in Andrew Okpeaha MacLean's On the Ice (2011).

== Political career ==
Patkotak is registered as an independent politician.

=== State representative ===
He represented District 40 as a member of the Alaska House of Representatives from 2021 to 2023. Patkotak defeated another Iñupiaq candidate, Elizabeth Niiqsik Ferguson (D), for the seat by a margin of 200 votes following the retirement of John Lincoln.

=== Borough mayor ===
Patkotak resigned from the Alaska House in October 2023 after being elected as mayor of North Slope Borough.

In February 2025, Patkotak apologized after borough police officers were recorded using a sled to transport the body of an Utqiagvik teen who died by suicide through the town.

During his tenure as borough mayor, Patkotak was criticized for having his wife and children join him on official trips at the borough's expense, and for using borough funds for first-class travel and luxury expenses on those trips. The borough assembly then approved changes to the borough code to allow the borough to pay for mayor's spouse and dependents to join them on borough-funded travel in December 2024. The code change was supported by Assembly president Crawford Patkotak, the mayor's father. This controversy contributed to recall petitions against both Patkotaks. The petition for Josiah Patkotak failed to gather sufficient signatures by the May 2025 deadline to trigger a recall election, while the petition for his father was filed too close to the end of his term.

Political offices
Preceded by Bryce Edgmon	Speaker of the Alaska House of Representatives; Acting; 2021	Succeeded by Louise Stutes
