= Kathy Simpler =

American politician

Member-elect of the Alaska House of Representatives from the 5th district
- Assuming office January 2027
- Succeeding: Louise Stutes

Personal details
- Party: Independent
- Education: University of Alaska Fairbanks

Kathy Simpler is an American politician. An independent, she is the member-elect for the 5th district of the Alaska House of Representatives.

Simpler attended the University of Alaska Fairbanks, earning her bachelor's degree in education. After earning her degree, she taught for the Kodiak Island Borough School District since 1996.
