= Chuck Kopp =

American politician

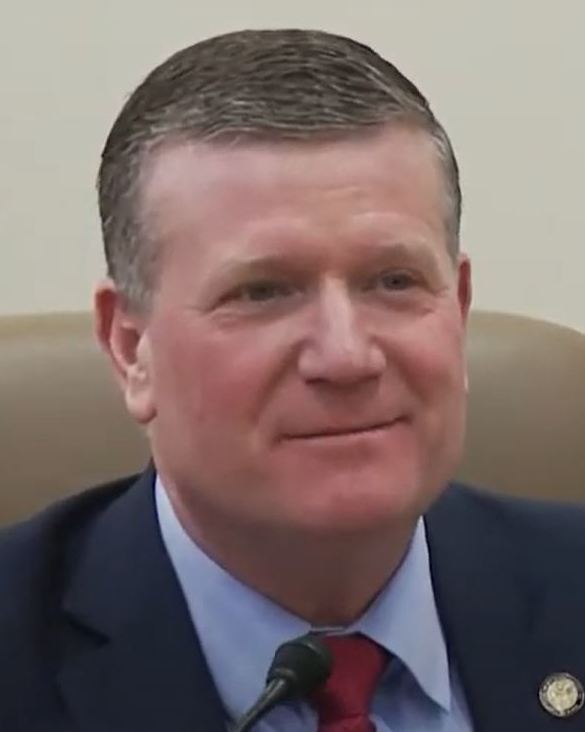

Majority Leader of the Alaska House of Representatives
- Incumbent
- Assumed office January 21, 2025
- Preceded by: Dan Saddler

Member of the Alaska House of Representatives
- Incumbent
- Assumed office January 21, 2025
- Preceded by: Craig Johnson
- Constituency: 10th district
- In office January 2017 – January 11, 2021
- Preceded by: Craig Johnson
- Succeeded by: Thomas McKay
- Constituency: 24th district

Personal details
- Born: 1964 or 1965 (age 61–62) Anchorage, Alaska, U.S.
- Party: Republican
- Other political affiliations: Coalition (2017–present)
- Education: University of Alaska, Anchorage (BA); University of Alaska, Southeast (attended)

Charles M. Kopp (born 1964/1965) is a retired police officer and member of the Alaska House of Representatives from the 10th district. He previously represented the 24th district from 2017 to 2021.

== Early life and education ==
Kopp was born in Anchorage, Alaska, and raised in Iliamna, Alaska. His parents were educators and entrepreneurs. He attended high school at the Cook Inlet Academy in Kalifornsky, Alaska. Kopp earned a Bachelor of Arts degree from the University of Alaska Anchorage. He studied toward a Master of Public Administration at the University of Alaska, Southeast.

== Career ==
Kopp served as an officer in the Anchorage Police Department and Kenai Police Department for a combined 20 years. He later became a certified polygraph examiner. For seven years, he served as Chief of Police of Kenai, Alaska and acting city manager from 2005 to 2006.

Kopp served as an advisor to Governors Sarah Palin and Frank Murkowski. He also served as the chief of staff for two members of the Alaska Senate. He was elected to the Alaska House of Representatives in 2016 and assumed office in 2017. A member of the Alaska Republican Party, Kopp was affiliated with the Republican Coalition in the Alaska House, a bipartisan group of Democratic, Republican, and Independent politicians. Kopp has written opinion columns for the Anchorage Daily News, Juneau Empire, and Peninsula Clarion.

== Electoral history ==
=== 2024 ===
==== Primary ====
2024 Nonpartisan primary
Party	Candidate	Votes	%
Republican	Chuck Kopp	1,449	60.5
Republican	Craig Johnson (incumbent)	947	39.5
Total votes		2,396	100.0

==== General ====
2024 Alaska House of Representatives election, District 10
Party	Candidate	Votes	%
Republican	Chuck Kopp	4,669	61.6
Republican	Craig Johnson (incumbent)	2,811	37.1
Write-in		101	1.3
Total votes		7,581	100.0
Republican hold			

Alaska House of Representatives
Preceded by Dan Saddler	Majority Leader of the Alaska House of Representatives; 2025–present	Incumbent
