= Garret Nelson =

American politician (born 1984)

Member of the Alaska House of Representatives from the 29th district
- Incumbent
- Assumed office December 30, 2025
- Preceded by: George Rauscher

Personal details
- Born: 1984 (age 41–42)
- Party: Republican

Gerald Garret Nelson (born 1984) is an American politician. He serves as a member of the Alaska House of Representatives from the 29th district. He was appointed by Governor Mike Dunleavy on December 24, 2025, and sworn in on December 30. He replaced George Rauscher, who was previously appointed to the Alaska Senate by Dunleavy. Nelson works as a salesman; he has prior experience as a cattle rancher, welder, and small business owner.
