= Laddie Shaw =

American politician (born 1949)

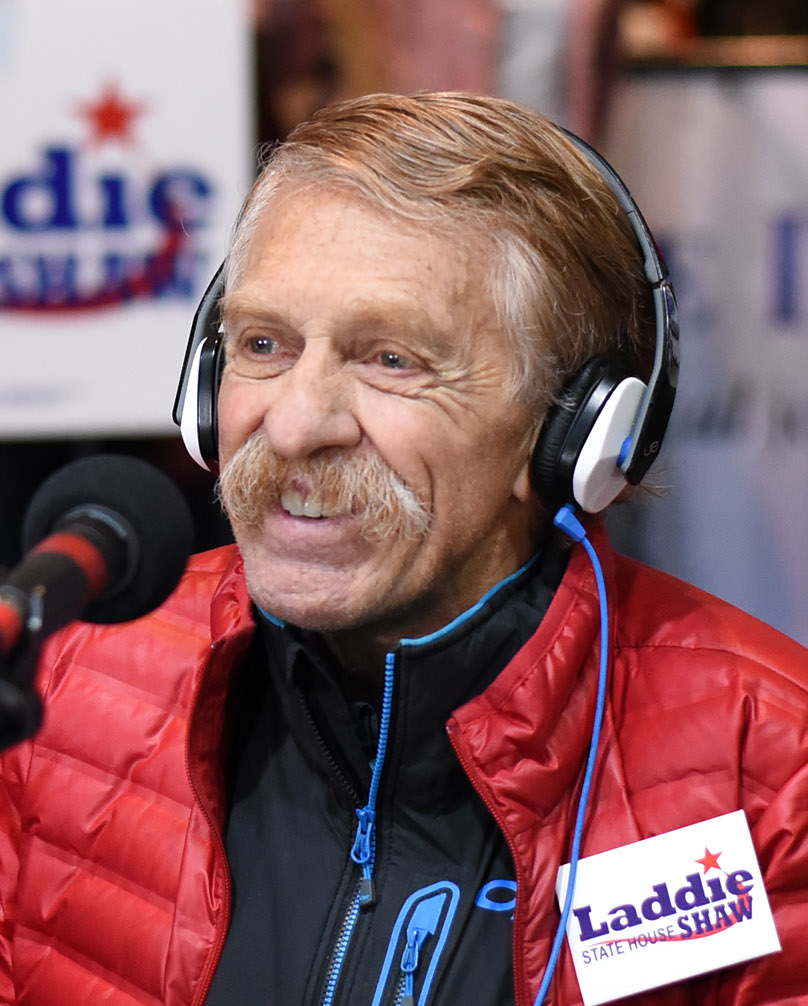
- Shaw in 2018

Member of the Alaska House of Representatives
- In office January 16, 2019 – January 21, 2025
- Preceded by: Chris Birch
- Succeeded by: Ky Holland
- Constituency: 26th district (2019–2023); 9th district (2023–2025)

Personal details
- Born: April 8, 1949 (age 77) Landshut, Germany
- Party: Republican
- Education: San Diego State University (BA); University of Alaska Southeast (MPA)

Ladislau Henry Shaw (born April 6, 1949) is an American politician. A member of the Republican Party, he has represented the 9th and 26th districts in the Alaska House of Representatives.

== Biography ==
Shaw was born in Landshut, Germany and graduated from high school in Flint, Michigan. Shaw received orders to Basic Underwater Demolition/SEAL training (BUD/S) at Naval Amphibious Base Coronado. After six months of training, Shaw graduated BUD/S class 53 in November 1969. He served two tours in South Vietnam with Underwater Demolition Team Thirteen (UDT-13) and SEAL Team ONE; he later served in the Naval Reserve and the Alaska Army National Guard.

Shaw holds a BA from San Diego State University and an MPA from University of Alaska Southeast.

== Political career ==
=== Alaska House of Representatives ===
In 2018, Shaw ran for election to represent the 26th district in the Alaska House of Representatives. He won a three-way Republican primary with 44.9% of the vote, and went on the win the general election with 62.3% of the vote.

Shaw sits on the following House committees:

- Military & Veterans' Affairs (Co-Chair)
- University Of Alaska (Finance Subcommittee)
- Administration (Finance Subcommittee)
- Judiciary
- Judiciary (Finance Subcommittee)
- Law (Finance Subcommittee)
- Military & Veterans' Affairs (Finance Subcommittee)
- State Affairs
- Joint Armed Services

=== Alaska Senate nomination ===
Following the death of Senator Chris Birch, Alaska Governor Mike Dunleavy picked Shaw to fill the District M seat in the Alaska State Senate in August 2019. However, the Governor's choice required the approval of the Senate, and Shaw was rejected. According to Shaw, he was blocked due to his stance on the amount of the Permanent Fund Dividend: Shaw supports a $3,000 dividend, while some Senate Republicans favor withdrawing less from the fund.

== Electoral record ==
2018 Republican primary election: Alaska House of Representatives, District 26
Party	Candidate	Votes	%
Republican	Laddie Shaw	1,078	44.9%
Republican	Joe Riggs	711	29.6%
Republican	Albert Fogle	611	25.5%

2018 general election: Alaska House of Representatives, District 26
Party	Candidate	Votes	%
Republican	Laddie Shaw	4,826	62.3%
Democratic	Anita Thorne	2,886	37.3%
	Other/Write-in votes	33	0.4%
