= Kevin J. McCabe =

American politician

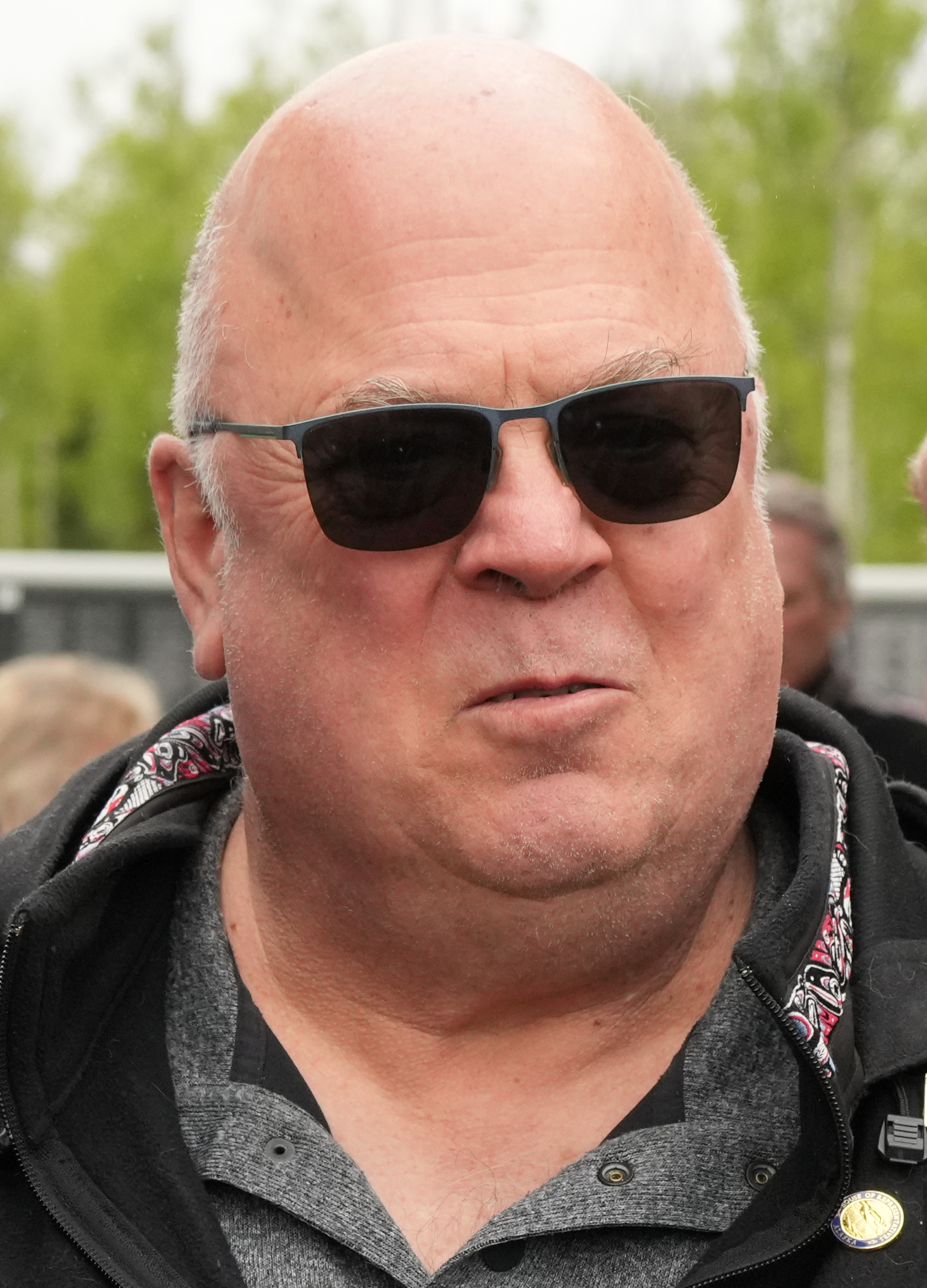
- McCabe in 2024

Member of the Alaska House of Representatives
- Incumbent
- Assumed office January 17, 2021
- Preceded by: Ron Gillham
- Constituency: 30th (2023-2025); 8th (2021-2023)

Personal details
- Party: Republican

Kevin J. McCabe (born 1958 or 1959) is an American Republican politician from Alaska representing District 30 in the Alaska House of Representatives. He was elected in 2022 receiving 3,662 (55.9% of the votes). Prior to redistricting he represented District 8 after being elected in 2020 receiving 7,533 (81.44% of the vote).

== Early life ==
McCabe was born in Hibbing, Minnesota.

== Electoral history ==
=== 2024 ===
==== Primary ====
2024 Nonpartisan primary
Party	Candidate	Votes	%
Republican	Kevin J. McCabe (incumbent)	1,483	54.6
Republican	Doyle Holmes	1,226	45.3
Total votes		2,709	100.0

==== General ====
2024 Alaska House of Representatives General Election, District 30
Party	Candidate	Votes	%
Republican	Kevin J. McCabe (incumbent)	4,731	54.1
Republican	Doyle Holmes	3,846	44.0
Write-in		163	1.9
Total votes		8,740	100.0
Republican hold			
