= Steve St. Clair =

American politician (born 1971)

Member of the Alaska House of Representatives from the 26th district
- Incumbent
- Assumed office December 30, 2025
- Preceded by: Cathy Tilton

Personal details
- Born: 1971 (age 54–55)
- Party: Republican

Stephan J. St. Clair (born 1971) is an American politician. St. Clair currently serves as a member of the Alaska House of Representatives from the 26th district. He was appointed by Governor Mike Dunleavy on December 24, 2025, and sworn in on December 30. He replaced Cathy Tilton, who was previously appointed to the Alaska Senate by Dunleavy. He spent seven years as Tilton's legislative aide and was a military policeman prior to that.
