= DeLena Johnson =

American politician (born 1963)

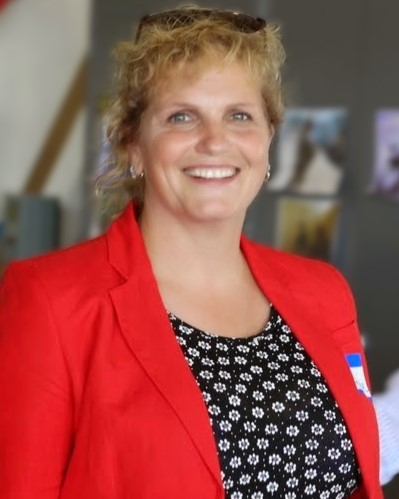
- Johnson in 2013

Minority Leader of the Alaska House of Representatives
- Incumbent
- Assumed office November 29, 2025
- Preceded by: Mia Costello

Member of the Alaska House of Representatives
- Incumbent
- Assumed office January 17, 2017
- Preceded by: Shelley Hughes
- Constituency: 11th district (2017–2023); 25th district (2023–present)

Personal details
- Born: 1963 or 1964 (age 61–62) Portland, Oregon, U.S.
- Party: Republican
- Spouse: Steven Johnson
- Children: 5
- Education: Matanuska-Susitna College (AAS); University of Alaska, Anchorage (BS)

DeLena Johnson (born 1963/1964) is a United States politician who sits in the Alaska House of Representatives. She is a member of the Republican Party, representing District 25. Prior to redistricting she represented District 11. The Republican caucus voted to make her Minority Leader on November 29, 2025, succeeding Mia Costello who resigned from the role.

Prior to serving on the legislature, Johnson was twice elected as Mayor of Palmer, Alaska.

== Early life and education ==
Johnson was born in Portland, Oregon and moved to Talkeetna, Alaska with her family in 1967, at the age of three. She attended Susitna Valley High School. She then earned an associates degree from Matanuska–Susitna College and a BA degree in mathematics from the University of Alaska Anchorage.

== Political career ==
=== Alaska Legislature ===
A Republican, Johnson was elected to the Alaska House of Representatives on November 8, 2016. Johnson served as a member of the House Energy, House Resources, and House State Affairs committees.

In 2020, Johnson sponsored a resolution requesting the United States Secretary of the Treasury to mint $1 coins honoring Elizabeth Peratrovich under the Native American $1 Coin Act. The resolution was successful.

== Electoral history ==
Johnson was reelected in 2018 and 2020.

=== 2024 ===
==== Primary ====
2024 Nonpartisan primary
Party	Candidate	Votes	%
Republican	DeLena Johnson (incumbent)	2,197	100.0
Total votes		2,197	100.0

==== General ====
2024 Alaska House of Representatives election, District 25
Party	Candidate	Votes	%
Republican	DeLena Johnson (incumbent)	7,817	95.9
Write-in		338	4.1
Total votes		8,155	100.0
Republican hold			

Alaska House of Representatives
Preceded by Mia Costello	Minority Leader of the Alaska House of Representatives; 2025–present	Incumbent
