= Mia Costello =

American politician (born 1968)

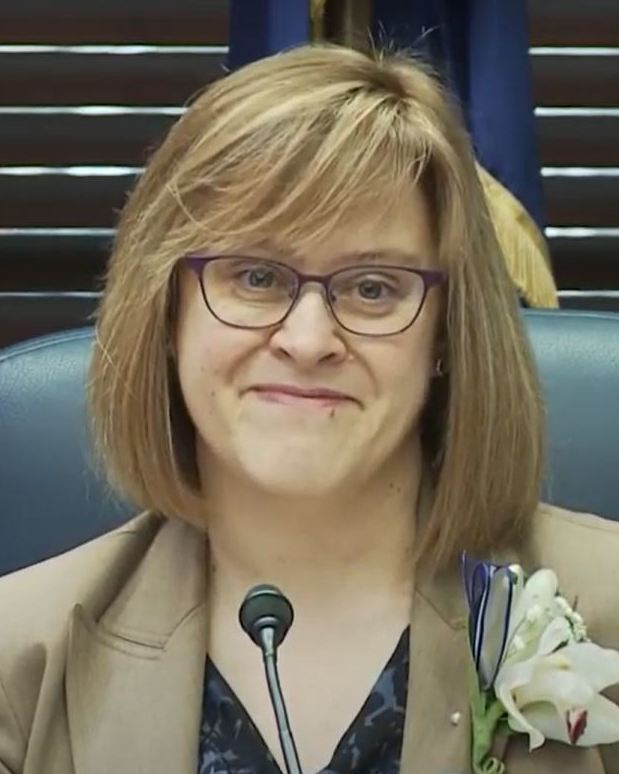

Majority Leader of the Alaska Senate
- In office January 15, 2019 – July 8, 2019
- Preceded by: Peter Micciche
- Succeeded by: Lyman Hoffman

Member of the Alaska Senate from the K district
- In office January 20, 2015 – January 17, 2023
- Preceded by: Lesil McGuire
- Succeeded by: Bill Wielechowski

Minority Leader of the Alaska House of Representatives
- In office January 21, 2025 – November 22, 2025
- Preceded by: Calvin Schrage
- Succeeded by: DeLena Johnson

Member of the Alaska House of Representatives
- Incumbent
- Assumed office January 21, 2025
- Preceded by: Tom McKay
- Constituency: 15th district
- In office January 18, 2011 – January 20, 2015
- Preceded by: Bob Buch
- Succeeded by: Mike Hawker
- Constituency: 27th district

Personal details
- Born: January 11, 1968 (age 58) Anchorage, Alaska, U.S.
- Party: Republican
- Spouse: Andrew Billings
- Education: Harvard University (BA); University of Alaska, Southeast (MA)
- Website: Campaign website

Mia C. Costello (born January 11, 1968) is a Republican politician from Alaska. She is a member of the Alaska House of Representatives from the 15th district. She previously represented the 20th district from 2011 to 2015 and served as a member of the Alaska Senate, representing District K from 2015 to 2023.

In November 2010, Costello defeated Democratic incumbent Bob Buch to win her House seat. Costello received 3,696 votes to Buch's 2,873. Costello served on the House Finance Committee and as chair of the Natural Resources Finance Subcommittee. She ran for the Senate seat vacated by Democrat Hollis French in 2014, picking up the seat to add to the Republican Senate Majority.

Costello served as minority leader for the 2025 legislative session but resigned the position in November 2025.

Prior to being elected to the Alaska State House, Costello worked as a school teacher, legislative aide, and as deputy communications director for Governor Frank Murkowski.

After graduating from West High School, she earned her B.A. from Harvard University and later a Master of Art in Teaching from the University of Alaska Southeast.

== Electoral history ==
=== 2024 ===
==== Primary ====
2024 Nonpartisan primary
Party	Candidate	Votes	%
Republican	Mia Costello	1,423	51.4
Democratic	Denny Wells	1,225	44.3
Democratic	Dustin Darden	120	4.3
Total votes		2,768	100.0

==== General ====
2024 Alaska House of Representatives election, District 15
Party	Candidate	Votes	%
Republican	Mia Costello	4,543	51.5
Democratic	Denny Wells	4,014	45.5
Democratic	Dustin Darden	242	2.8
Write-in		17	0.2
Total votes		8,816	100.0
Republican hold			

=== 2022 ===
Nonpartisan primary
Party	Candidate	Votes	%
Democratic	Matt Claman	6,022	52.6
Republican	Mia Costello (incumbent)	5,424	47.4
Total votes		11,446	100.00

2022 Alaska Senate election, District H
Party	Candidate	Votes	%
Democratic	Matt Claman	7,868	51.8
Republican	Mia Costello (incumbent)	7,271	47.9
Write-in	Write-ins	51	0.3
Total votes		15,190	100.0
Democratic gain from Republican			

Alaska Senate
Preceded by Peter Micciche	Majority Leader of the Alaska Senate; 2019	Succeeded by Lyman Hoffman
Alaska House of Representatives
Preceded by Calvin Schrage	Minority Leader of the Alaska House of Representatives; 2025	Succeeded by DeLena Johnson
