= George Rauscher =

American politician

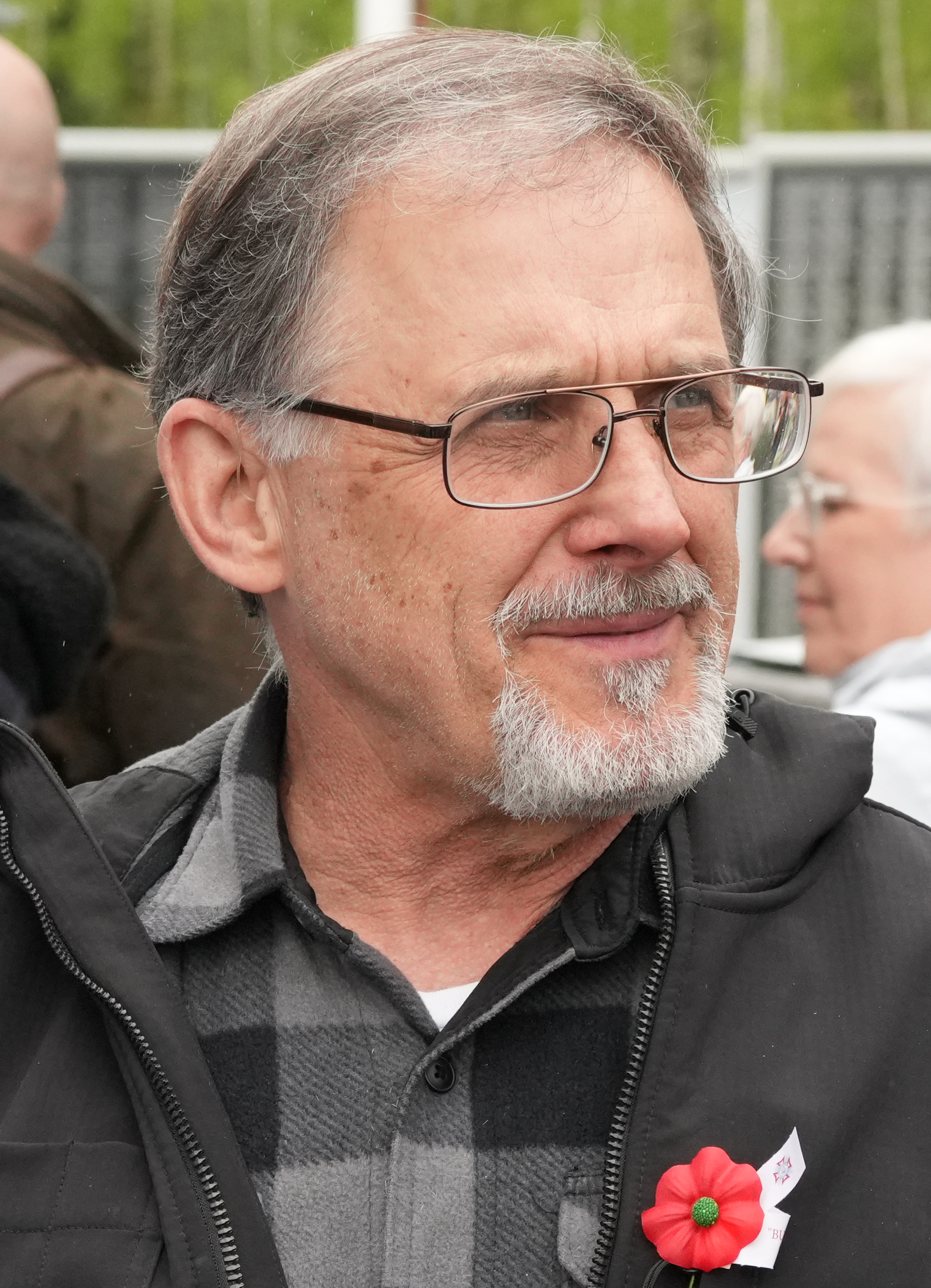

Member of the Alaska Senate from the O district
- Incumbent
- Assumed office November 29, 2025
- Preceded by: Mike Shower

Member of the Alaska House of Representatives
- In office January 17, 2017 – November 29, 2025
- Preceded by: Jim Colver
- Succeeded by: Garret Nelson
- Constituency: 9th district (2017–2023); 29th district (2023–2025)

Personal details
- Party: Republican
- Spouse: Elizabeth
- Website: http://www.akleg.gov/basis/Member/Detail/31?code=rau

George Rauscher is a Republican member of the Alaska Senate, representing the O district. He previously served in the Alaska House of Representatives, representing the 29th District. Prior to 2020 redistricting he represented the 9th District.

== Political career ==
Rauscher served on the Sutton Community Council from 2007 to 2011. He defeated Representative Jim Colver during the August 2016 primary election by 95 votes. He defeated Pamela Goode in the November election.

In 2018, Rauscher won the Republican party nomination over Colver and Goode. He was reelected in November 2018, defeating Democrat Bill Johnson and Republican James Squyres.

Rauscher was appointed to the Alaska Senate in November 2025 to succeed Mike Shower.

In February 2026, Rauscher's chief of staff was indicted for sex trafficking. Rauscher called the charges "a shock to my office" and fired the employee on learning of the charges.

== Electoral history ==
=== 2024 ===
==== Primary ====
2024 Nonpartisan primary
Party	Candidate	Votes	%
Republican	George Rauscher (incumbent)	2,060	100.0
Total votes		2,060	100.0

==== General ====
2024 Alaska House of Representatives election, District 29
Party	Candidate	Votes	%
Republican	George Rauscher (incumbent)	7,807	95.6
Write-in		363	4.4
Total votes		8,170	100.0
Republican hold			
