= Dan Saddler =

American politician

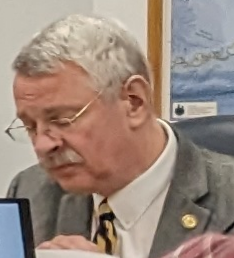

Majority Leader of the Alaska House of Representatives
- In office January 19, 2023 – January 21, 2025
- Preceded by: Chris Tuck
- Succeeded by: Chuck Kopp

Member of the Alaska House of Representatives from the 24th district
- Incumbent
- Assumed office January 17, 2023
- Preceded by: Ken McCarty (redistricting)
- In office January 2011 – December 2018
- Preceded by: Nancy Dahlstrom
- Succeeded by: Sharon Jackson
- Constituency: 18th district (2011–2013); 12th district (2013–2015); 13th district (2015–2018)

Personal details
- Born: Daniel Robert Saddler; 1961 (age 64–65) Elyria, Ohio, U.S.
- Party: Republican
- Education: Miami University (BA); Ohio State University (MA)
- Website: Official website

Daniel Robert Saddler (born 1961) is an American politician who serves as a Republican member of the Alaska House of Representatives. He took office in January 2011 and resigned in December 2018 to take a position in the administration of Governor Mike Dunleavy. He was later elected to a new term beginning in January 2023.

== Career ==
Saddler's professional experiences include being an engineering magazine editor, newspaper reporter, legislative staffer for various lawmakers in Alaska, and a public relations executive for an Alaska regional corporation.

== Education ==
Saddler earned his BA in journalism from Miami University and his MA from Ohio State University.

== Election history ==
- 2012 With Republican Representative Eric Feige redistricted to District 6, Saddler won the District 12 August 28, 2012 Republican Primary with 1,185 votes (88.30%), and was unopposed for the November 6, 2012 General election, winning with 4,663 votes (96.56%) against write-in candidates.
- 2010 When Republican Representative Nancy Dahlstrom resigned and the District 18 seat was left open through the election, Saddler won the three-way August 24, 2010 Republican Primary by 4 votes, with 415 votes (35.84%), and won the November 2, 2010 General election with 1,944 votes (68.89%) against Democratic nominee Martin Lindeke.

=== 2024 ===
==== Primary ====
2024 Nonpartisan primary
Party	Candidate	Votes	%
Republican	Dan Saddler (incumbent)	2,776	100.0
Total votes		2,776	100.0

==== General ====
2024 Alaska House of Representatives election, District 24
Party	Candidate	Votes	%
Republican	Dan Saddler (incumbent)	7,981	96.8
Write-in		262	3.2
Total votes		8,243	100.0
Republican hold			

== Personal life ==
Saddler's interests include hiking, flying, writing songs and performing, and American history.

Alaska House of Representatives
Preceded by Chris Tuck	Majority Leader of the Alaska House of Representatives; 2023–2025	Succeeded by Chuck Kopp
