= Calvin Schrage =

American politician from Alaska (born 1991)

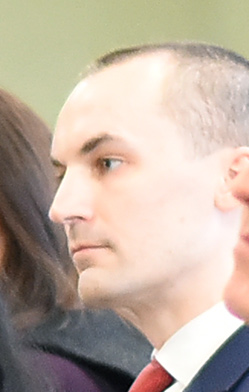
- Schrage at a town hall held at the University of Alaska, Anchorage

Minority Leader of the Alaska House of Representatives
- In office January 18, 2023 – January 21, 2025
- Preceded by: Cathy Tilton
- Succeeded by: Mia Costello

Member of the Alaska House of Representatives
- Incumbent
- Assumed office January 18, 2021
- Preceded by: Mel Gillis
- Constituency: 25th district (2021–2023); 12th district (2023–present)

Personal details
- Born: Calvin Richard Schrage; April 7, 1991 (age 35) Anchorage, Alaska, U.S.
- Party: Independent
- Education: University of Alaska, Anchorage (BBA)

Calvin Richard Schrage (born 1991) is an American politician from Alaska. He represents District 12 as a member of the Alaska House of Representatives; he is an independent.

== Education ==
Schrage graduated from University of Alaska Anchorage in Anchorage. He went to Abbott Loop Elementary, Hanshew Middle School, and Service High School, which are all in the city.

== Political career ==
Schrage was re-elected in 2022 and elected House Minority Leader.

== Electoral history ==
=== District 12 ===
==== Primary ====
Nonpartisan primary
Party	Candidate	Votes	%
Independent	Calvin Schrage (incumbent)	1,390	65.0
Republican	Joe Lurtsema	750	35.1
Total votes		2,140	100.0

==== General ====
2024 Alaska House of Representatives election, District 12
Party	Candidate	Votes	%
Independent	Calvin Schrage (incumbent)	4,763	60.8
Republican	Joe Lurtsema	3,041	38.8
Write-in		27	0.3
Total votes		7,831	100.0
Independent hold			

== Personal life ==
Schrage and his wife, Heather Schrage live in Calvin's childhood home. He is a Christian.

Alaska House of Representatives
Preceded by Cathy Tilton	Minority Leader of the Alaska House of Representatives; 2023–2025	Succeeded by Mia Costello
