= Cathy Tilton =

American politician (born 1962)

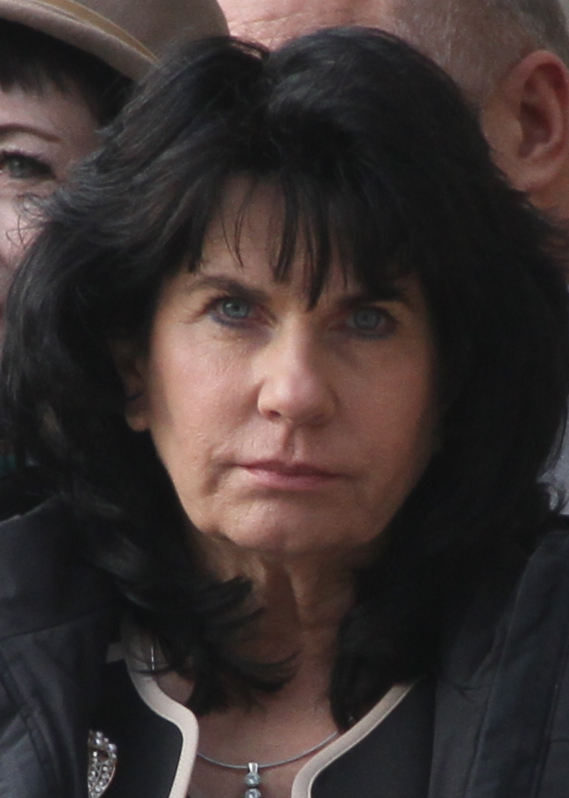
- Tilton in 2019

Member of the Alaska Senate from the M district
- Incumbent
- Assumed office November 29, 2025
- Preceded by: Shelley Hughes

Speaker of the Alaska House of Representatives
- In office January 18, 2023 – January 21, 2025
- Preceded by: Louise Stutes
- Succeeded by: Bryce Edgmon

Minority Leader of the Alaska House of Representatives
- In office February 16, 2021 – January 18, 2023
- Preceded by: Lance Pruitt
- Succeeded by: Calvin Schrage

Member of the Alaska House of Representatives from the 26th district
- In office January 20, 2015 – November 29, 2025
- Preceded by: Bill Stoltze
- Succeeded by: Steve St. Clair

Personal details
- Born: August 28, 1962 (age 64) Wasilla, Alaska, U.S.
- Party: Republican
- Spouse: Berkley
- Children: 3
- Education: University of Alaska, Anchorage (attended)

Cathy Tilton (born August 28, 1962) is an American politician from Alaska. A Republican, she was appointed to represent District M in the Alaska Senate in November 2026. She previously served as Speaker of the Alaska House of Representatives from 2023 to 2025, and represented District 26 which is entirely within the Matanuska-Susitna Borough. Prior to 2020 redistricting, she represented District 12.

== Background ==
Tilton is a self-employed real estate professional and former legislative aide. She resides in Wasilla, Alaska.

== Political career ==
In 2014, Tilton succeeded Bill Stoltze in the Alaska House of Representatives after he was elected to the Alaska State Senate.

Tilton was elected Speaker of the House on January 18, 2023.

Tilton was appointed to the Alaska Senate in November 2025 to succeed Shelley Hughes, who resigned to focus on her gubernatorial campaign.

== Personal life ==
In October 2026, relatives and friends of a Wasilla man who died by suicide in 2023 accused Tilton of engaging in a long-term, exploitative sexual relationship with him that allegedly began in the 1990s, when she was in her late 20s and he was a teenage employee at her family's home.

== Electoral history ==
=== 2024 ===
==== Primary ====
2024 Nonpartisan primary
| Party | Candidate | Votes | % |
|---|---|---|---|
| Republican | Cathy Tilton (incumbent) | 1,681 | 100.0 |
| Total votes | | 1,681 | 100.0 |

==== General ====
2024 Alaska House of Representatives election, District 26
| Party | Candidate | Votes | % |
|---|---|---|---|
| Republican | Cathy Tilton (incumbent) | 7,353 | 96.7 |
| Write-in | | 254 | 3.3 |
| Total votes | | 7,607 | 100.0 |
| Republican hold | | | |

Alaska House of Representatives
| Preceded by Lance Pruitt | Minority Leader of the Alaska House of Representatives; 2021–2023 | Succeeded by Calvin Schrage |
Political offices
| Preceded by Louise Stutes | Speaker of the Alaska House of Representatives; 2023–2025 | Succeeded by Bryce Edgmon |
