= Bryce Edgmon =

American politician from Alaska (born 1961)

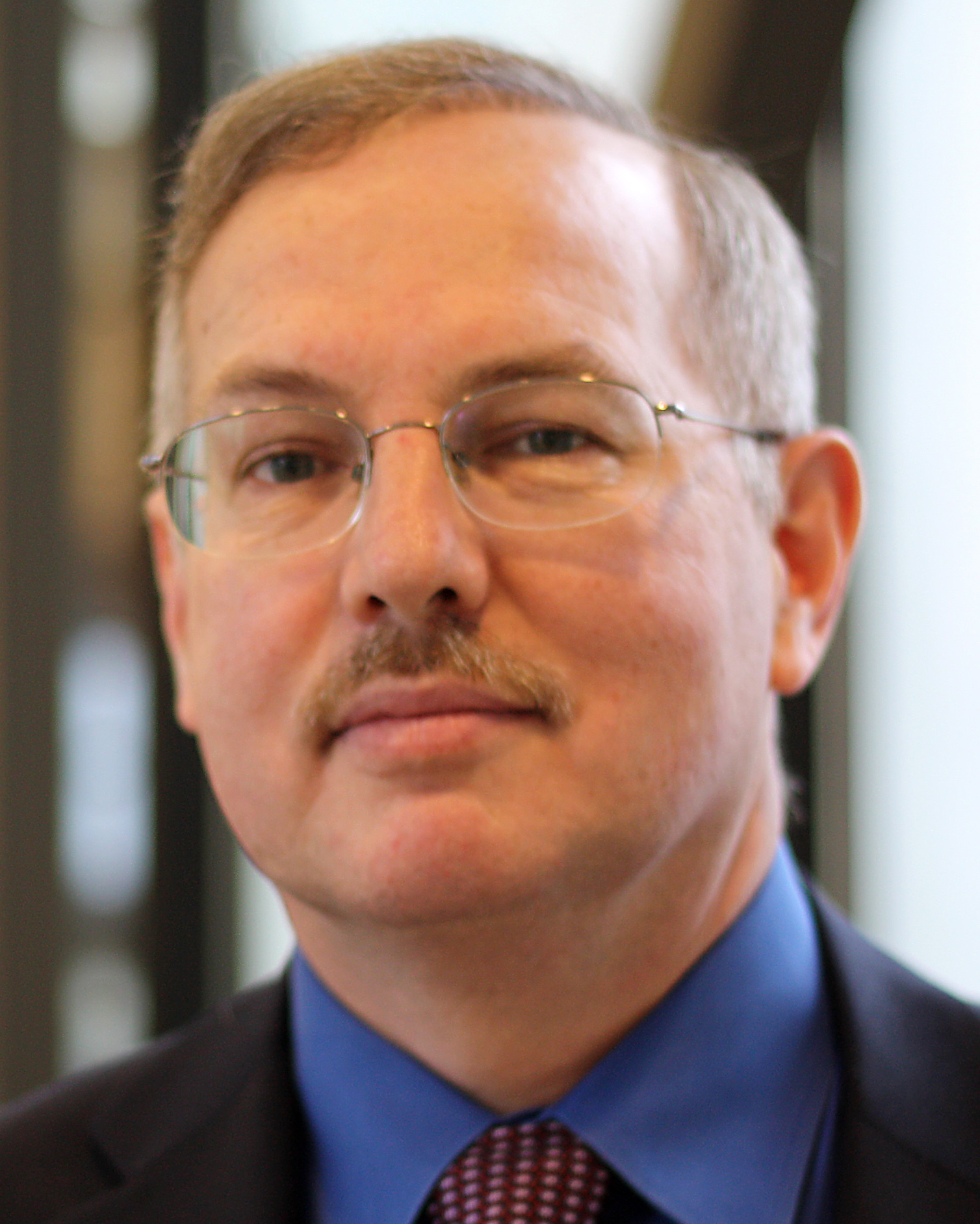
- Edgmon in 2013

Speaker of the Alaska House of Representatives
- Incumbent
- Assumed office January 21, 2025
- Preceded by: Cathy Tilton
- In office February 14, 2019 – January 19, 2021
- Preceded by: Neal Foster (acting)
- Succeeded by: Josiah Patkotak (acting)
- In office January 17, 2017 – January 15, 2019
- Preceded by: Mike Chenault
- Succeeded by: Neal Foster (acting)

Member of the Alaska House of Representatives
- Incumbent
- Assumed office January 15, 2007
- Preceded by: Carl Moses
- Constituency: 37th district (2007–2013); 36th district (2013–2015); 37th district (2015–present)

Personal details
- Born: May 3, 1961 (age 65) Dillingham, Alaska, U.S.
- Party: Democratic (before 2019); Independent (2019–present)
- Spouse: Melody Edgmon
- Children: 4
- Education: University of Alaska, Anchorage (BBA)

Bryce Edgmon (born May 3, 1961) is the current speaker of the Alaska House of Representatives, a position he also held from 2017 to 2021. He represents the 37th District, which includes all or portions of the Kodiak Island Borough, Aleutians East Borough, Lake and Peninsula Borough, Bristol Bay Borough, and the Yukon–Koyukuk Census Area.

As of 2026, Edgmon is the most senior member of the Alaska House of Representatives.

== Early and personal life ==
Edgmon was born and raised in Dillingham, Alaska, where he fished commercially for salmon and herring for more than twenty years and where he was a longtime chairman of the board of Choggiung Ltd., the Alaska Native village corporation for the communities of Dillingham, Ekuk, and Portage Creek. Edgmon's birth certificate identified him as three-sixteenths Aleut, and Edgmon was raised in a household that spoke Yup'ik. Edgmon is married to Melody Nibeck, and they have three children: Evan, Emma, and Magy. He currently lives in Dillingham. He received his Bachelor of Business Administration from the University of Alaska, Anchorage.

== Legislative career ==
Bryce Edgmon challenged incumbent Carl Moses in the 2006 Democratic primary. The election deadlocked in a tie with each candidate receiving 767 votes. Eventually, the tie was settled by a coin toss.

After his party won 17 seats in 2016, two independents and three moderate Republicans decided to caucus with the Democrats, elevating him to Speaker. He is the first Alaskan Native in the history of the state to hold the position.

In addition to his duties as Speaker, Edgmon serves as vice-chair of the Health & Social Services Committee and chair of the Committee on Committees. He is also a member of the Commerce, Community & Economic Development; Legislative Council; and Arctic Policy and Economic Development & Tourism Committees for the 30th Legislature.

Prior to the 30th Alaska Legislature, Edgmon was seated on the House Finance Committee, with chairmanships of the Department of Public Safety and Department of Corrections Budget Subcommittees. During the 26th Legislature (2009–2010), Edgmon was co-chair of the House Energy Committee and chairman of the House Special Committee on Fisheries. Additionally, he has served on the Resources and Education Standing Committees and the ADF&G, Revenue, Commerce, and Transportation Budget Subcommittees.

== Electoral history ==
=== 2024 ===
==== Primary ====
2024 Nonpartisan primary
Party	Candidate	Votes	%
Independent	Bryce Edgmon (incumbent)	852	69.0
Independent	Darren Deacon	383	31.0
Total votes		1,235	100.0

==== General ====
2024 Alaska House of Representatives election, District 37
Party	Candidate	Votes	%
Independent	Bryce Edgmon (incumbent)	2,748	72.5
Independent	Darren Deacon	1,002	26.4
Write-in		41	1.1
Total votes		3,791	100.0
Independent hold			

== See also ==
- List of Native American politicians
- List of state legislature Speakers

Political offices
Preceded by Mike Chenault	Speaker of the Alaska House of Representatives; 2017–2019	Succeeded by Neal Foster; Acting
Preceded by Neal Foster; Acting	Speaker of the Alaska House of Representatives; 2019–2021	Succeeded by Josiah Patkotak; Acting
Preceded by Cathy Tilton	Speaker of the Alaska House of Representatives; 2025–present	Incumbent
