= Recall election =

Vote to remove an official prematurely

A recall election (also called a recall referendum, recall petition or representative recall) is a procedure by which voters can remove an elected official from office through a referendum before that official's term of office has ended. Recalls appear in the constitution in ancient Athenian democracy. Even where they are legally available, recall elections are only commonly held in a small number of countries including Peru, Ecuador, Taiwan, and Japan. They are considered by groups such as ACE Electoral Knowledge Network as the most rarely used form of direct democracy.

== Process ==
The processes for recall elections vary greatly by country and can be originated in different ways. Initiating a recall can be done in two ways:

- Indirect (also known as a "Mixed" or "Top-down" recall): A recall may only be triggered by an official authority such as a government, parliament, or president.
- Direct (also known as a "Full" or "Bottom-up" recall): A recall may be triggered by the public directly as a popular initiative.

== Financial costs ==
The scheduling of a recall outside of normal elections causes additional expense. For example, the 2021 California gubernatorial recall election cost taxpayers $300 million for an election that the governor won 61.9% to 38.1%.

== Voter turnout ==
Many recall elections take place in off-years, resulting in much lower voter turnout than regularly scheduled elections. Participation quorums can reduce voter turnout due to no-show paradox and strategic abstention. Media coverage can increase voter turnout.

== By country ==
=== Argentina ===
The recall referendum arrived in Latin America shortly after its introduction at the US subnational level, in 1923 and 1933, to Cordoba and Entre Ríos provinces, respectively, both in Argentina. There, recall exists at the provincial level in Chaco (introduced in 1957), Chubut (1994), Córdoba (1923, 1987), Corrientes (1960), La Rioja (1986), Rio Negro (1988), Santiago del Estero and Tierra del Fuego (1991); other provinces include it for their municipalities, namely, Entre Ríos (1933), Neuquén (1957), Misiones (1958), San Juan (1986), San Luis (1987). It is also included in Buenos Aires City (1996).

=== Canada ===
An attempt at introducing recall legislation for Canada's federal Parliament was brought in October 1999 by Reform Party opposition member Ted White through a private members bill entitled Bill C 269, the Recall Act (An Act to establish the right of electors to recall members of Parliament.). However, the legislation stalled and did not progress past first reading.

As such, no nation-wide recall statute exists, but two provinces, Alberta and British Columbia, have recall laws on the books.

==== Alberta ====
The province of Alberta enacted recall legislation for members of the Legislative Assembly in 1936 during the Social Credit government of William Aberhart. The legislation was repealed after a petition was introduced for the recall of Aberhart himself.

In 2020, the Government of Alberta announced it will introduce a bill allowing recall elections for members of the Legislative Assembly, municipal governments, and school boards. This bill, Bill 52, was passed and received royal assent on June 17, 2021, and came into effect on April 7, 2022.

==== New Brunswick ====
Recall was available in New Brunswick in the early 20th century. A successful recall election took place in Saint John in late 1918.

==== British Columbia ====
British Columbia's Recall and Initiative Act, enacted in 1995, provides a process for recalling members of the Legislative Assembly of British Columbia. Voters in a provincial riding can petition to have their member of the Legislative Assembly removed from office once said MLA has been in office for at least 18 months. If over 40 percent of registered voters in the riding sign the petition and the petition is validated by Elections BC, the chief electoral officer informs the speaker of the Legislative Assembly and the member in question that the member has been recalled and their seat vacated. A by-election is called by the lieutenant governor of British Columbia as soon as possible to fill the vacant seat. The recalled MLA is permitted to run in the by-election for their former seat. Twenty-six recall petitions have been launched as of 2020; of the six completed petitions returned to Elections BC, five were rejected for having too few valid signatures. The sixth, on the recall of MLA Paul Reitsma, was halted after Reitsma resigned in 1998 during the secondary verification stage.

=== Colombia ===
In Colombia, the recall referendum was included by the constitution in 1991. The constitutional replacement was launched as an answer to the movement known as la séptima papeleta (the seventh ballot), which requested a constitutional reform to end violence, narcoterrorism, corruption and increasing citizenship apathy. The definition of recall referendum in relation to programmatic vote was approved. It obliges candidates running for office to register a government plan which is later on considered to activate the recall. Since the time the mechanism was regulated by Law 134 in 1994, until 2015, 161 attempts led 41 referendums and none of them succeeded since the threshold of participation was not reached. In 2015, a new law (303/2015) reduced the number of signatures required to activate a recall referendum (from 40 per cent to 30 per cent of the total of votes obtained by the elected authority) and the threshold (dropping from the 50 per cent to the 40 per cent of valid votes on the day of the elections of the challenged authority). The change in the regulation, also quickening the registration of promoters, led to a considerable increase in the number of attempts.

=== Cuba ===
According to its constitution, Cuba is a socialist republic in which all members of representative bodies of state power are subject to recall by the masses. As a principle of soviet democracy, similar recall provisions have been included in the constitutions of many other communist countries, including that of the Soviet Union. Although allowable according to law, in practice the right of recall was never used.

=== Ecuador ===
Article 105 of the 2008 Constitution of Ecuador provides for recall of all elected officials:

People in enjoyment of political rights may revoke the mandate of popularly elected authorities. The request for revocation of the mandate may be submitted once the first and before the last year of the period for which the authority in question was elected. During the management period of an authority, only one process of revocation of the mandate may be carried out. The revocation request must be supported by a number not less than ten percent of people registered in the corresponding electoral registry. In the case of the President of the Republic, the support of a number not less than fifteen percent of those registered in the electoral registry will be required.

— Article 105 of the Constitution of Ecuador (translated from Spanish)

=== Germany ===
==== Mayoral recalls ====
Mayors may be recalled in 11 out of the 16 states of Germany. In a majority of these states recall elections are indirect, meaning that they only take place after a motion of no confidence from the municipal council of the city. A supermajority vote is normally needed to start the recall process from the council. Four states also allow the direct recall, where citizens may sign a petition to trigger the recall vote.

Process of recalling mayors in Germany
State	Year of introduction	Requires either:		Turnout requirement of recall vote (Percentage of Voters)
State	Year of introduction	Signatures (percentage of citizens)	Municipal councilors vote	Turnout requirement of recall vote (Percentage of Voters)
Brandenburg	1993	15–20%	2/3	25%
Hesse	1993	Not available	2/3	30%
Lower Saxony	1996	Not available	3/4	25%
Mecklenburg-Vorpommern	1999	Not available	2/3	33.33%
North Rhine-Westphalia	1999	15–20%	2/3	25%
Rhineland-Palatinate	1994	Not available	2/3	30%
Saarland	1994	Not available	2/3	30%
Saxony	1994	33.33%	3/4	50%
Saxony-Anhalt	1994	Not available	3/4	30%
Schleswig-Holstein	1997	20%	2/3	20%
Thuringia	1994	Not available	1/2	30%

==== State parliaments ====
The recall of members of the state parliaments of Germany exist in five states; Bavaria, Berlin, Brandenburg, Bremen, and Rhineland-Palatinate. All of these states only allow for the recall of the entire legislature by triggering a new election, the recall of individual members is not allowed.

Article 18, Section 3 of the Constitution of Bavaria provides, that the entire Landtag can be dismissed by referendum on petition of 1 million citizens, with elections of a new Landtag to be held up to six weeks after the recall referendum.

=== Kiribati ===
Section 59 of the Constitution of Kiribati provides for a majority of electors in a district (who were electors of the district at the time of the original election) to sign a petition requesting a recall election. The recall election must not occur less than 6 months after the original election or a failed recall attempt. If the recall election is successful another election to fill the seat must be held within 3 months.

=== Latvia ===
Article 14 of the Constitution of Latvia enables the recall of the entire Saiema, though not of specific representatives:

Article 14: Not less than one tenth of electors has the right to initiate a national referendum regarding recalling of the Saeima.
If the majority of voters and at least two thirds of the number of the voters who participated in the last elections of the Saeima vote in the national referendum regarding recalling of the Saeima, then the Saeima shall be deemed recalled.
The right to initiate a national referendum regarding recalling of the Saeima may not be exercised one year after the convening of the Saeima and one year before the end of the term of office of the Saeima, during the last six months of the term of office of the President, as well as earlier than six months after the previous national referendum regarding recalling of the Saeima.
The electors may not recall any individual member of the Saeima.

=== Mexico ===
In Mexico, the State of Yucatán was the first to introduce the recall in 1938. The mechanism, which had never been used, was declared unconstitutional 72 years later by the Supreme Court of Justice of the Nation. A similar mechanism introduced in Chihuahua in 1997 was also declared unconstitutional and consequently eliminated from law. Despite these precedents, the recall was later included in the states of Oaxaca (1998), Morelos (2011), Guerrero (2013), Zacatecas and Aguascalientes.

=== New Zealand ===
Early policies of the New Zealand Labour Party included support for "the recall".

=== Peru ===
Recall regulations were introduced in Peru by the Democratic Constituent Congress (Congreso Constituyente Democrático) which drafted a new constitution after Alberto Fujimori's autogolpe in 1992. Between 1997 and 2013, more than 5000 recall referendums were activated against democratically elected authorities from 747 Peruvian municipalities (45.5% of all municipalities). This makes Peru the world's most intensive user of this mechanism.

=== Philippines ===
Article 10 of the 1987 constitution of the Philippines allows for the recall of local officials. The Local Government Code, as amended, enabled the application of the provisions of the constitution. Elected officials from provincial governors to the barangay (village) councilors are potentially subject to recall. At least 15% of the electorate in a specific place must have their signatures verified in a petition for the recall to take place.

The president, vice president, members of Congress, and the elected officials of the Bangsamoro cannot be removed via recall.

Above the barangay level, there had been eight recall elections, of which at least 2 led to a successful recall of an incumbent; the most recent recall election was the 2015 Puerto Princesa mayoral recall election.

=== Switzerland ===
While recalls are not provided for at the federal level in Switzerland, six cantons allow them:

- Bern: Recall of the executive and legislative has been possible since 1846. 30,000 signatures (4% of all adult citizens) are required to trigger a recall referendum. There has been one unsuccessful attempt to recall the executive in 1852 (the 'Schatzgelder' affair).
- Schaffhausen: Recall of the executive and legislative has been possible since 1876. 1,000 signatures (2% of all adult citizens) are required to trigger a recall referendum. There has been one unsuccessful attempt to recall the executive in 2000, triggered by the lawyer and cantonal MP Gerold Meier.
- Solothurn: Recall of the executive and legislative has been possible since 1869. 6,000 signatures (3% of all adult citizens) are required to trigger a recall referendum. There has been one unsuccessful attempt to recall the executive and legislative in 1995 (related to a banking scandal). Three further attempts (in 1887, 1961 and 1973) failed to collect the necessary number of signatures.
- Ticino: Recall of the executive has been possible since 1892. 15,000 signatures (7% of all adult citizens) are required to trigger a recall referendum. There has been one unsuccessful recall attempt in 1942. In addition, recall of municipal executives has been possible since 2011. Signatures of 30% of all adult citizens are required to trigger a recall referendum.
- Thurgau: Recall of the executive and legislative has been possible since 1869. 20,000 signatures (13% of all adult citizens) are required to trigger a recall referendum. There have been no recall attempts.
- Uri: Recall of the executive and legislative has been possible since 1888. Since 1979, 600 signatures (3% of all adult citizens) have been required to trigger a recall referendum. In addition, recall of municipal executives and legislatives has been possible since 2011. Signatures of 10% of registered voters are required to trigger a recall referendum. There have been no recall attempts either at the cantonal or municipal levels.

The possibility of recall referendums (together with the popular election of executives, the popular initiative and the legislative referendum) was introduced into several cantonal constitutions after the 1860s in the course of a broad movement for democratic reform. The instrument has never been of any practical importance—the few attempts at recall so far have failed, usually because the required number of signatures was not collected—and it was abolished in the course of constitutional revisions in Aargau (1980), Baselland (1984) and Lucerne (2007). The only successful recall so far happened in the Canton of Aargau in the year 1862. However, the possibility of recalling municipal executives was newly introduced in Ticino in 2011, with 59% of voters in favor, as a reaction to the perceived problem of squabbling and dysfunctional municipal governments.

=== Soviet Union ===
Article 142 of The 1936 Constitution of the Soviet Union gave the right in theory to recall deputies in legislatures at all levels of government:

Article 142. It is the duty of every deputy to report to his electors on his work and on the work of the Soviet of Working People's Deputies, and he is liable to be recalled at any time in the manner established by law upon decision of a majority of the electors.

— 1936 Constitution of the Soviet Union

As a principle of soviet democracy, similar recall provisions have been widely copied in the constitutions of other communist countries, including those of Cuba, China, Vietnam, North Korea, and countries in the Eastern Bloc. Although allowable according to law, in practice the right of recall was never used in any soviet system of government, except for an attempt in Hungary in 1989.

=== Taiwan ===
In Taiwan, according to the Additional Articles of the Constitution, the recall of the president or the vice president shall be initiated upon the proposal of one-fourth of all members of the Legislative Yuan, and also passed by two-thirds of all the members. The final recall must be passed in a recall election by more than one-half of the valid ballots in a vote in which more than one-half of the electorate in the free area of the Republic of China takes part.

Other elected officials can be recalled in elections by more than 1/4 of the total electors in the original electoral district, and where the number of votes consenting to the recall is more than that of dissenting.

On 6 June 2020, Mayor of Kaohsiung Han Kuo-yu became the first mayor to be recalled. 939,090 votes out of 969,259 agreed the recall.

After Mayor of Keelung George Hsieh defeated a recall vote in October 2024, the Kuomintang proposed amendments to the Public Officials Election and Recall Act. In December 2024, the Legislative Yuan approved changes requiring that initiators and signatories of recall petitions provide photocopies of their national identification cards.

In 2025, due to the 2024 Taiwanese constitutional controversy, civic groups launched the "Great Recall Wave" to recall more than 30 Kuomintang legislators and mayor of Hsinchu City. The recall vote for 24 Kuomintang legislators and mayor of Hsinchu City were held on July 26, 2025. The recall vote for the two legislators in Nantou were held on August 23, 2025. None of the recall attempts proved successful, and the KMT remained the biggest party in the Legislative Yuan.

=== Ukraine ===
A year after the 2015 Ukrainian local elections, voters can achieve a recall election of an elected deputy or mayor if as many signatures as voters are collected.

=== United Kingdom ===
The Recall of MPs Act 2015 (c. 25) is an act of the Parliament of the United Kingdom which mandates a recall petition to be held if a member of Parliament is found to have committed certain wrongdoings, including any that result in a custodial prison sentence. The petitions cannot be triggered by popular initiative. The subsequent recall petition is successful if signed by at least 10% of the electorate in the MP's constituency. Successful recall leads to a by-election to fill the seat.

The act received royal assent on 26 March 2015 after being introduced on 11 September 2014. The UK's first recall petition occurred in 2018, with the first successful one occurring the next year in Peterborough.

There are no recall procedures for other elected officials in the United Kingdom.

=== United States ===
==== History ====
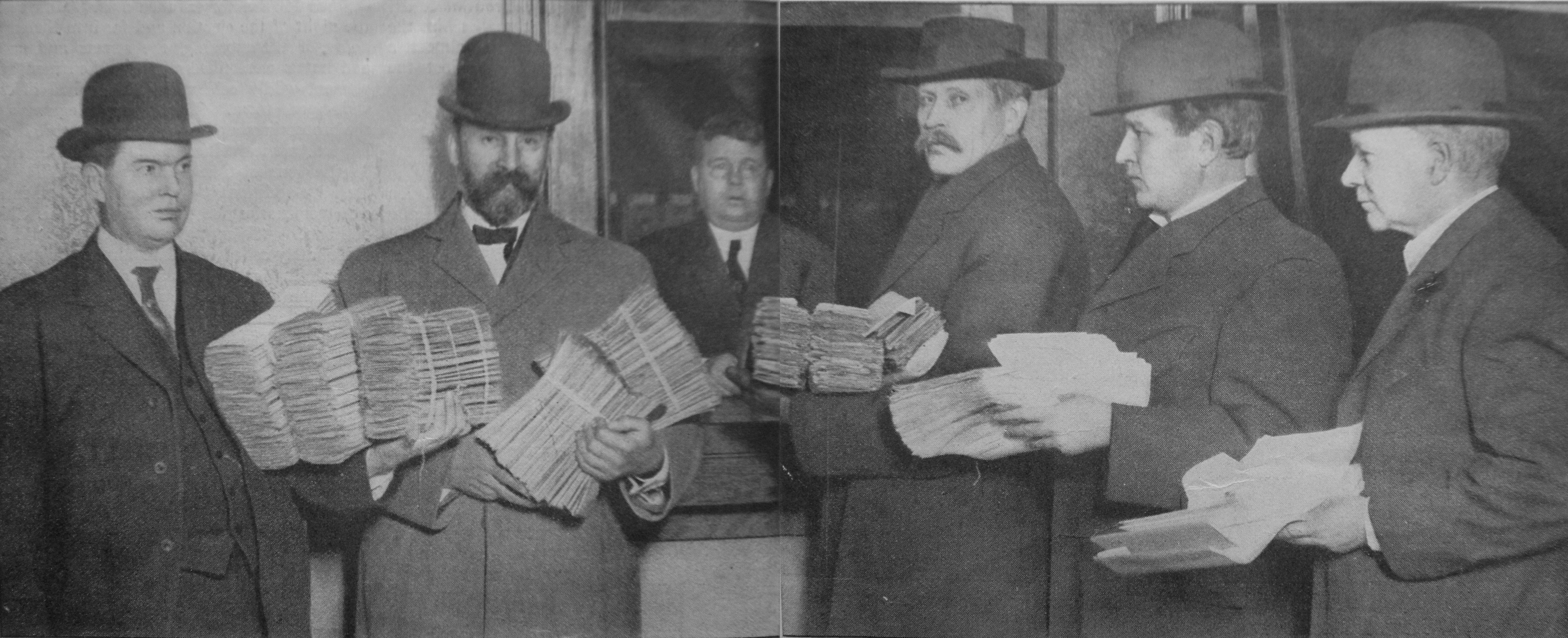
Submitting petitions for the recall of Seattle, Washington, mayor Hiram Gill in December 1910; Gill was removed by a recall election the following February, but voters returned him to the office in 1914

Recall first appeared in Colonial America in the laws of the General Court of the Massachusetts Bay Colony in 1631. This version of the recall involved one elected body removing another official. During the American Revolution, the Articles of Confederation stipulated that state legislatures might recall delegates from the Continental Congress. According to New York Delegate John Lansing, the power was never exercised by any state. The Virginia Plan, issued at the outset of the Philadelphia Convention of 1787, proposed to pair recall with rotation in office and to apply these dual principles to the lower house of the national legislature. The recall was rejected by the Constitutional Convention. However, the anti-Federalists used the lack of recall provision as a weapon in the ratification debates.

Only two governors have ever been recalled. In 1921, Governor Lynn Frazier of North Dakota was recalled during a dispute about state-owned industries. In 2003, Governor Gray Davis of California was recalled over the state budget. Additionally, in 1988, a recall was approved against Governor Evan Mecham of Arizona, but he was impeached and convicted before it got on the ballot.

In Alaska, Georgia, Kansas, Minnesota, Montana, Rhode Island, and Washington, specific grounds are required for a recall. Some form of malfeasance or misconduct while in office must be identified by the petitioners. The target may choose to dispute the validity of the grounds in court, and a court then judges whether the allegations in the petition rise to a level where a recall is necessary. Anna Louise Strong, member of the Seattle School board, was recalled from her position in 1918, apparently on grounds that she was supporting extreme labour positions. In the November 2010 general election, Illinois passed a referendum to amend the state constitution to allow a recall of the state's governor, in light of former Governor Rod Blagojevich's corruption scandal. In the other eleven states that permit statewide recall, no grounds are required and recall petitions may be circulated for any reason. However, the target is permitted to submit responses to the stated reasons for recall.

The minimum number of signatures to qualify a recall, and the time limit to do so, vary among the states. In addition, the handling of recalls, once they qualify, differs. In some states a recall triggers a simultaneous special election, where the vote on the recall, as well as the vote on the replacement if the recall succeeds, are on the same ballot. In the 2003 California recall election, over 100 candidates appeared on the replacement portion of the ballot. In other states, a separate special election is held after the target is recalled, or a replacement is appointed by the Governor or some other state authority.

The largest amount of recalls in the United States were held in 2021, as 529 officials faced recalls, but it had the lowest amount of successful recalls as only 25 were removed.

==== 2011 recalls ====
In 2011, there were at least 150 recall elections in the United States. Of these, 75 officials were recalled, and nine officials resigned under threat of recall. Recalls were held in 17 states in 73 different jurisdictions. Michigan had the most recalls (at least 30). The year set a record for number of state legislator recall elections (11 elections) beating the previous one-year high (three elections).

Three jurisdictions adopted the recall in 2011.

Of recall elections, 52 were for city council, 30 were for mayor, 17 were for school board, 11 were for state legislators, and one was for a prosecuting attorney (York County, Nebraska). The largest municipality to hold a recall was Miami-Dade County, Florida, for mayor.

The busiest day was November 8 (Election Day) with 26 recalls. In 34 jurisdictions, recalls were held over multiple days.

==== Successful recalls ====
===== Alaska =====
- 1998 recall of Tim Peters, mayor of North Pole, Alaska.

===== Arizona =====
- 2011 recall of Arizona State Senator Russell Pearce.

===== California =====
- 1913 recall of a judge in San Francisco
- 1928 recall of Lester R. Rice-Wray, Los Angeles, California, City Council member
- 1932 recalls of three judges in Los Angeles
- 1938 recall of Mayor Frank L. Shaw in Los Angeles, California
- 1995 recall of California State Assemblyman Paul Horcher
- 1995 recall of California State Assembly Speaker Doris Allen
- 2003 recall of Gray Davis, Governor of California
- 2012 recall of Fullerton, California City Council members Don Bankhead, F. Richard "Dick" Jones and Patrick McKinley.
- 2018 recall of California superior court judge Aaron Persky of Santa Clara County over his sentencing decision in People v. Turner
- 2018 recall of California State Senator Josh Newman over his vote to raise the gas tax
- 2020 recall of Santa Cruz, California, city council members Chris Krohn and Drew Glover for workplace misconduct
- 2022 recall of San Francisco Unified School District Commissioners Gabriela López, Alison Collins, and Faauuga Moliga
- 2022 recall of San Francisco District Attorney Chesa Boudin
- 2022 recall of Big Bear Lake, California, city council member Alan Lee
- 2023 recall of Downey, California, city council member Catherine Alvarez
- 2024 recall of Alameda County, California, District Attorney Pamela Price
- 2024 recall of Millbrae, California, city council members Angelina Cahalan and Maurice Goodman
- 2024 recall of Oakland, California, mayor Sheng Thao
- 2025 recall of San Francisco Supervisor Joel Engardio
- 2026 recall of Avenal councilmembers Alvaro Preciado, Leticia Gamez, Pablo Hernandez, and Reynosa Reynosa

===== Colorado =====
- 2012 recall of Melinda Myers, Clerk & Recorder of Saguache County, Colorado.
- 2013 recall of Colorado Democratic State Senator John Morse
- 2013 recall of Colorado Democratic State Senator Angela Giron
- 2015 recall of three school board members in Jefferson County, Colorado

===== Florida =====
- 2011 recall of Carlos Alvarez, Mayor of Miami-Dade County, Florida.
- 2011 recall of Natacha Seijas, Miami-Dade County Commissioner.
- 2020 recall of Sebastian, Florida vice mayor Charles Mauti and city council members Damien Gilliams and Pamela Parris over allegations of malfeasance and alleged Sunshine Law violations.

===== Idaho =====
- 1916 recall of J. W. Robinson, Mayor of Boise, Idaho

===== Iowa =====
- 2023 recall of Warren County Auditor David Whipple

===== Louisiana =====
- 2013 recall of Deedy Slaughter, Mayor of Port Allen, Louisiana

===== Maine =====
- 2013 recall of six of the seven city council members in Old Orchard Beach, Maine

===== Maryland =====
- 2018 recall of Bowie, Maryland, city councilwoman Diane Polangin, over her vote to approve a controversial development project located in her district

===== Massachusetts =====
- 2014 recall of Fall River, Massachusetts Mayor William A. Flanagan
- 2015 recall of four selectmen in Saugus, Massachusetts

===== Michigan =====
- 1983 recall of Michigan state senators Phil Mastin and David Serotkin due to their support for a state income tax hike. The loss of these two Democratic lawmakers, along with two special elections won by Republicans, flipped the state senate to GOP control, where it remained until the 2022 Michigan elections.
- 2002 recall of Woodrow Stanley, mayor of Flint, Michigan.
- 2011 recall of Michigan State Representative Paul Scott
- 2012 recall of Janice Daniels, mayor of Troy, Michigan
- 2023 recall of Stephanie Scott, Clerk of Adams Township, Hillsdale County
- 2023 recall of Mark Nichols, Supervisor of Adams Township, Hillsdale County

===== Minnesota =====
- 2022 recall of Two Harbors mayor Chris Swanson

===== Missouri =====
- 2025 recall of Frank White, Jackson County Executive.

===== Nebraska =====
- 1987 recall of Mike Boyle, Mayor of Omaha, Nebraska.

===== New Jersey =====
- 1994 recall of officials in River Vale, New Jersey: Mayor Walter Jones, Councilwoman Patricia Geier, and Councilman Bernard Salmon
- 2018 recall of Mahwah, New Jersey, mayor William Laforet.

===== North Dakota =====
- 1921 recall of Lynn Frazier, Governor of North Dakota

===== Ohio =====
- 2016 recall of Mayor and City Council President in East Cleveland, Ohio
- 2010 recall of Jane Murray, Mayor of Portsmouth, Ohio

===== Oregon =====
- 2011 recall of Neal Knight, Mayor of Cornelius, Oregon, and city councilors Mari Gottwald and Jamie Minshall, less than a year after their election, due to unhappiness over their votes to fire the city manager.
- 2008 recall of Carmen Kontur-Gronquist, Mayor of Arlington, Oregon.
- 2018 recall of Toledo, Oregon, mayor Billie Jo Smith and two City Council members over allegations of malfeasance, wrongful termination of city employees, and conducting city business at secret meetings

===== Texas =====
- 1996 recall of Carrollton Texas Mayor Gary Blanscet and council members Linda Caldwell, Bernis Francis, Stan Hampton, Bob Novinsky, Bert Colter, and Stan Sewell.
- 2011 recall of multiple Killeen, Texas, elected city officials including Mayor Pro Tem Scott Cosper and four city council members.
- 2019 recall of Rusk, Texas, city council members Jan Pate and Ken Ferrara for conduct unbecoming of a council member
- 2020 recall of McKinney, Texas, city council member La'shadion Shemwell for conduct unbecoming of a council member

===== Virginia =====
- 1987 recall of James Holley, Mayor of Portsmouth, Virginia
- 2010 recall of James Holley, Mayor of Portsmouth, Virginia.

===== Washington =====
- 1911 recall of Hiram Gill, Mayor of Seattle, Washington
- 2005 recall of James E. West, Mayor of Spokane, Washington.
- 2014 recall of Mayor Marilynn Lynn of Bridgeport, WA

===== Wisconsin =====
- 1977 recall of County Judge Archie Simonson, Madison, Wisconsin
- 1977 recall of five members of the La Crosse School Board, La Crosse, Wisconsin
- 1992 recall of four members of the La Crosse School Board
- 1996 recall of Wisconsin State Senator George Petak
- 2002 recall of multiple Milwaukee County, Wisconsin, elected county officials including Executive F. Thomas Ament (resigned before election); Board Chair Karen Ordinans; and Board Supervisors Penny Podell, LeAnn Launstein, David Jasenski, Kathy Arciszewski, James McGuigan, and Linda Ryan. All were recalled due to a retirement pension controversy.
- 2003 recall of Wisconsin State Senator Gary George
- 2011 recall of Wisconsin State Senator Randy Hopper
- 2011 recall of Wisconsin State Senator Dan Kapanke
- 2012 recall of Bob Ryan, Mayor of Sheboygan, Wisconsin
- 2012 recall of Wisconsin State Senator Van H. Wanggaard
- 2025 recall of DeForest village trustee William Landgraf

==== Unsuccessful recalls ====
- 1932 recall election of Wisconsin State Senator Otto Mueller
- 1978 recall of Cleveland Mayor Dennis Kucinich
- 1982 recall of Grant County, Wisconsin Judge William L. Reinecke
- 1983 recall of San Francisco Mayor Dianne Feinstein
- 1990 recall of Wisconsin State Assemblyman Jim Holperin
- 2008 recall of California State Senator Jeff Denham
- 2008 recall of Michigan House of Representatives Speaker Andy Dillon
- 2009 recall of San Jose, California City Council member Madison Nguyen
- 2009 recall of Akron Mayor Don Plusquellic
- 2010 recall of Mayor Doug Isaacson in North Pole, Alaska
- 2010 recall of Mayor Anthony R. Suarez in Ridgefield, New Jersey
- 2011 recall of Omaha, Nebraska Mayor Jim Suttle
- 2011 recall of Wisconsin State Senator Dave Hansen
- 2011 recall of Wisconsin State Senator Robert Cowles
- 2011 recall of Wisconsin State Senator Sheila Harsdorf
- 2011 recall of Wisconsin State Senator Luther Olsen
- 2011 recall of Wisconsin State Senator Alberta Darling
- 2011 recall of Wisconsin State Senator Robert Wirch
- 2011 recall of Wisconsin State Senator Jim Holperin
- 2012 recall of Wisconsin Governor Scott Walker
- 2012 recall of Wisconsin Lieutenant Governor Rebecca Kleefisch
- 2012 recall of Wisconsin State Senator Scott L. Fitzgerald
- 2012 recall of Wisconsin State Senator Terry Moulton
- 2013 recall of La Crosse, Wisconsin City Council President Audrey Kader
- 2014 recall of Port Orford, Oregon Mayor Jim Aubornn
- 2017 recall of Flint, Michigan, mayor Karen Weaver
- 2021 recall of Gavin Newsom, Governor of California

Note: Wisconsin's Jim Holperin has the distinction of being the only U.S. politician to have been subjected to recall from service in two different legislative bodies: the Wisconsin State Assembly in 1990 and the Wisconsin State Senate in 2011. Both attempts were unsuccessful.

==== Unsuccessful attempts to qualify recall elections ====
- 1967 United States Senator Frank Church of Idaho was the subject of an unsuccessful recall effort. Courts ruled that a federal official is not subject to state recall laws.
- 1988 Evan Mecham, Governor of Arizona, was scheduled for a recall election on May 17 of that year, after a successful petition drive (301,000 signatures). However, the Supreme Court of Arizona canceled the election, since Mecham had already been removed from office (via impeachment conviction) by the Senate on April 4.
- 1992–93 Pete Wilson, Governor of California was targeted for recall by the Bite 'Em Back campaign, which was a grassroots effort that came about as a result of a piece by San Jose Mercury News columnist Pat Dillon, in response to the then-ongoing California budgetary crisis. The Bite 'Em Back campaign also intended to recall then-Speaker of the Assembly Willie L. Brown, and then-President Pro Tem of the state Senate, David Roberti.
- 2003 H. Brent Coles, mayor of Boise, Idaho, was the subject of a recall petition drive. Coles resigned on February 14, 2003, before the recall drive could proceed.
- 2009 Joseph Cao U.S. representative for Louisiana's 2nd congressional district, was determined to be not subject to recall because of his status as a Federal office holder.
- 2009 a petition failed to garner sufficient signatures to oblige an election for recall of Eddie Price III, mayor of Mandeville, Louisiana.
- 2009 a petition for recall of Stacy Head, New Orleans city councilwoman, likewise failed to gain the requisite number of signatures.
- 2010 there were two unsuccessful recall petitions for Sam Adams mayor of Portland, OR.
- 2010 there was one unsuccessful recall petition for Lisa Poppaw city council member of Fort Collins, CO.
- 2010 there was one unsuccessful recall petition for Antonio Villaraigosa mayor of Los Angeles.
- 2010, a recall proposal aimed at mayor Ron Littlefield of Chattanooga, Tennessee, failed after a judge of the Hamilton County, Tennessee circuit court ruled that too many of the petition signatures were invalid and that the petitioners had failed to properly adhere to the state's recall law, leaving "pages without dates".
- 2011, the Tennessee Court of Appeals ruled in November that the Hamilton County Circuit Court Judge Jeff Hollingsworth did not have the jurisdiction in entering an injunction against the Hamilton County Election Commission. In its judgment summary the Appeals Court said, "The trial court acted without jurisdiction in entering an injunction against the Election Commission. The judgment of the trial court is vacated and the complaint dismissed." Mayor Littlefield is continuing legal action to stop the recall.
- 2011, as part of the 2011 Wisconsin Senate recall elections, there were a number of failed recall petitions. Petitions against senators Lena Taylor (D), Spencer Coggs (D), Mark Miller (D), Glenn Grothman (R), Julie Lassa (D), Fred Risser (D), and Mary Lazich (R), were unsuccessful. Many senators had multiple recall petitions filed against them, and in the case of both Wirch and Hansen, one succeeded while others failed.
- 2011, an effort to recall Michigan Governor Rick Snyder was ended after organizers did not obtain enough petition signatures to appear on the ballot.
- 2011, a petition to recall Idaho Superintendent of Public Instruction Tom Luna failed to obtain the necessary signatures to force a recall election.
- 2011, an attempt to prompt recall election of Trenton, New Jersey, mayor Tony F. Mack failed to obtain enough support.
- 2011 recall of Alaska State Representative Kyle Johansen, rejected by the state's Division of Elections on October 10. Republicans in his district sponsored the recall when Johansen and fellow representative Charisse Millett left the House's majority caucus in a dispute over Johansen's role in the 27th Legislature. In 2012, Johansen ran for reelection as an independent and lost by a wide margin; Millett was reelected.
- 2017: In Loveland, Ohio, Mayor Mark Fitzgerald resigned under pressure from a recall effort, and a move to replace him was declared invalid, leaving the city with no mayor for several months.
- 2019: Kate Brown, Governor of Oregon, was the subject of a recall petition due to her support of Oregon House Bill 2020 which also resulted in the 2019 Oregon Senate Republican walkouts.
- 2020: In Norman, Oklahoma, the mayor and four of the eight city councilmembers were the subject of unsuccessful recall initiatives.

=== Venezuela ===
Article 72 of the Constitution of Venezuela enables the recall of any elected representative, including the president. This provision was used in the 2004 Venezuelan recall referendum, which attempted to remove President Hugo Chávez:

Article 72: All [...] offices filled by popular vote are subject to revocation.
Once one-half of the term of office to which an official has been elected has elapsed, a number of voters representing at least 20% of the registered voters in the affected constituency may petition for the calling of a referendum to revoke that official's mandate.
When a number of voters equal to or greater than the number of those who elected the official vote in favour of the recall, provided that a number of voters equal to or greater than 25% of the total number of registered voters vote in the recall referendum, the official's mandate shall be deemed revoked and immediate action shall be taken to fill the permanent vacancy as provided for by this Constitution and by law.

The 2004 recall referendum failed with 59.25% voting against removing Chavez from office.

== See also ==
- Legislative referral
- Motion of no confidence
- Off-year election
- Popular referendum
- Snap election

== Bibliography ==
- SANTANA, Alexander. O direito de revogação do mandato político representativo. Curitiba, 2004. 146 f. Monografia (Graduação em Direito) - Setor de Ciências Jurídicas, Universidade Federal do Paraná. (wrote in Brazilian Portuguese) English Title: The right of recall elected officials.
- Recall elections in the United Kingdom
- WELP, Yanina. "Recall referendum around the world: origins, institutional designs and current debates", in Morel, Laurence & Qvortrup, Matt. The Routledge Handbook to Referendums and Direct Democracy. London: Routledge, 2018.
