= Climate of Oregon =

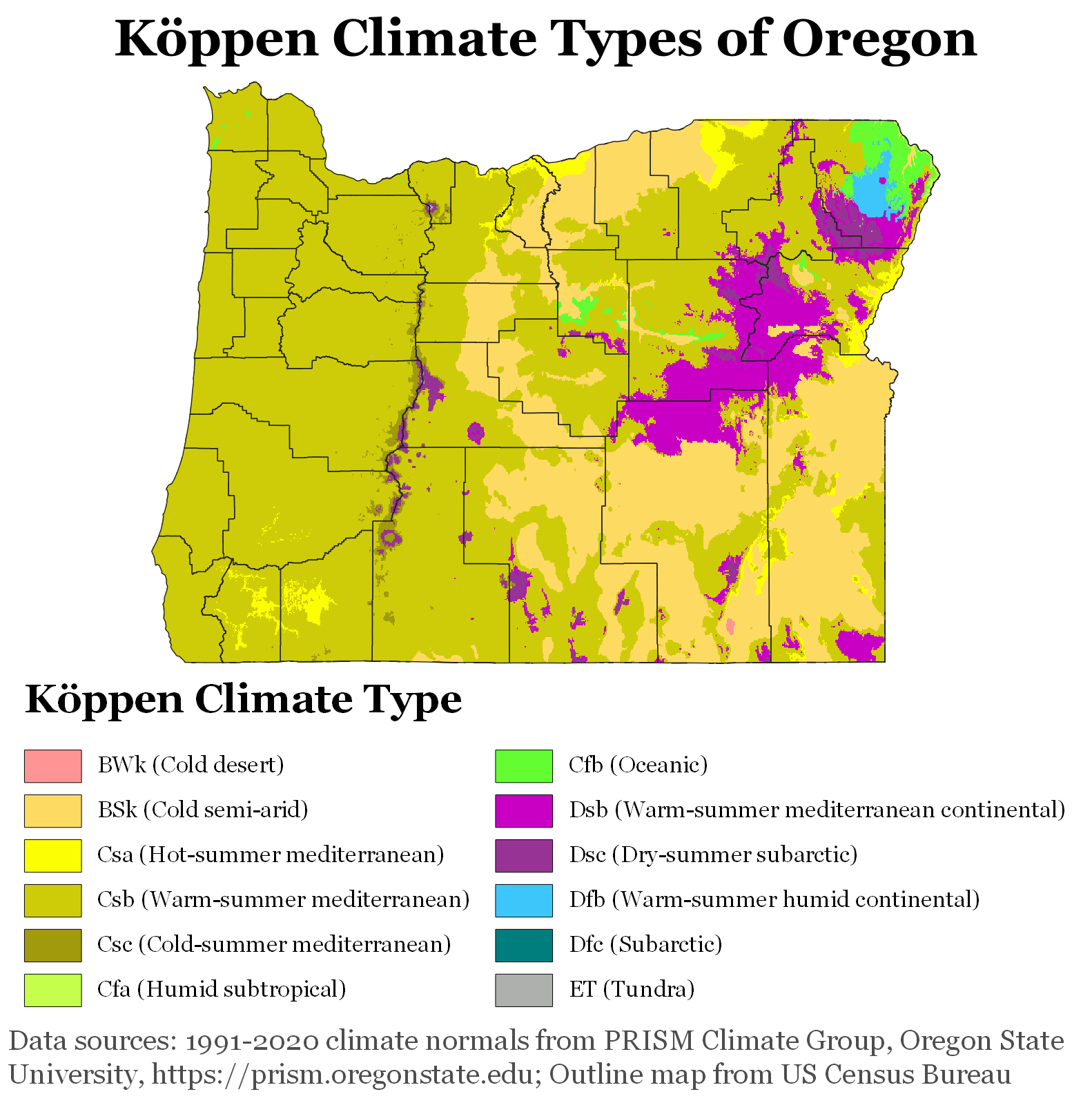
Köppen climate types of Oregon, using 1991-2020 climate normals.

Trewartha climate types of Oregon

According to the Köppen climate classification, most of Western Oregon has a warm-summer Mediterranean climate (or Csb type), which features warm, dry summers, and wet winters with frequent overcast and cloudy skies. Eastern Oregon falls into the cold semi-arid climate (or BSk type), which features drier weather.

West of the Cascade Range, winters are chilly with frequent rain and occasional snow. Temperatures can get very cold, but only occasionally, as the result of Arctic cold waves. The high desert region of the state is much drier, with less rain, more snow, colder winters, and hotter summers.

== Precipitation ==
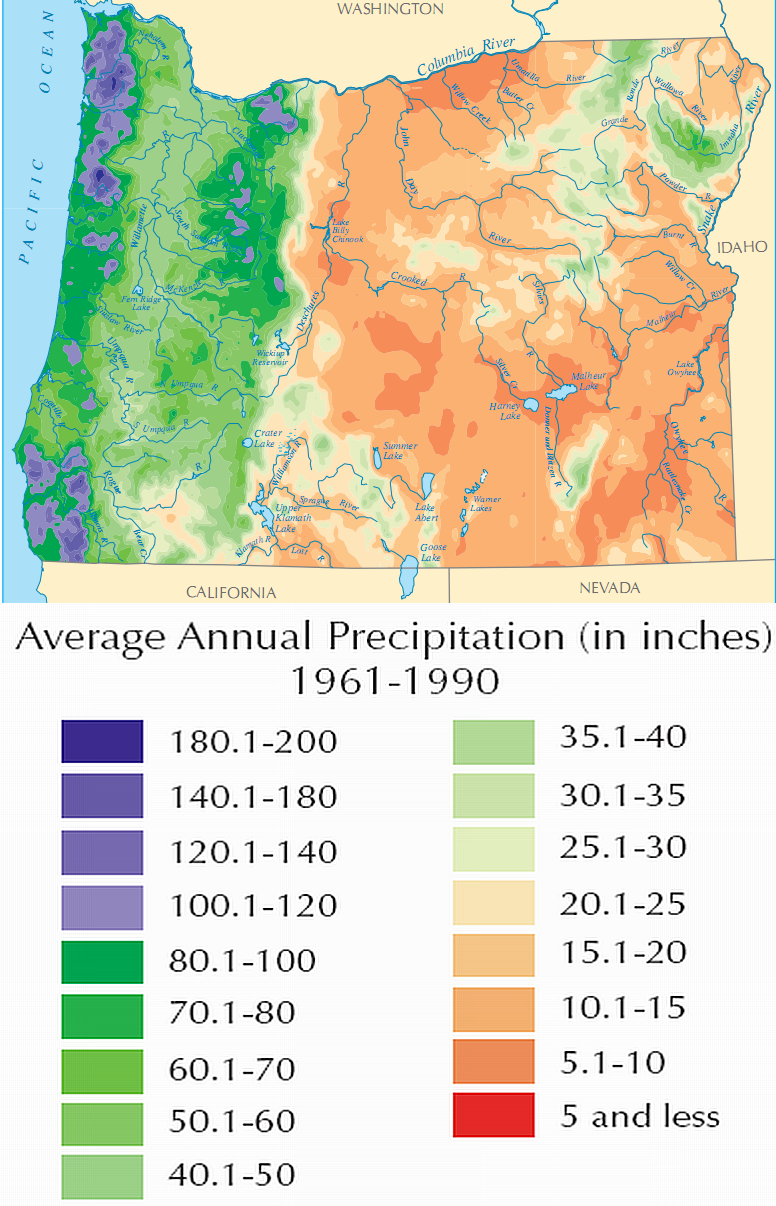
Oregon rainfall varies widely from region to region.

Precipitation in the state varies widely: some western coastal slopes approach 200 inches (5,100 mm) annually, while the driest places, such as the Alvord Desert (in the rain shadow of Steens Mountain) in eastern Oregon, get as little as 5 inches (130 mm).

The Pacific Ocean, the moisture-laden air above it, and the storms moving from it over the Oregon coast, are major factors in the state's precipitation patterns. As humid ocean air flows east from the ocean and encounters the Coast Range, it rises steeply, cools, and loses moisture through condensation, which produces heavy rain. The heaviest precipitation in the state occurs at 2,000 to 4,000 feet (610 to 1,220 m) above sea level in these coastal mountains. At lower elevations along the coast, orographic precipitation is less intense but still produces 60 to 80 inches (1,500 to 2,000 mm) a year.

In the Willamette Valley east of the Coast Range, storms "blowing" from the Pacific retain enough moisture to drop from 35 to 45 inches (890 to 1,140 mm) annually in the most heavily populated part of the state. East of the valley, the storm air rises again as it meets the Cascade Range, cooling once more and forming condensate at elevations often as low as 3,000 feet (910 m). Since volcanic peaks in the range are quite high—more than 11,000 feet (3,400 m) in the case of Mount Hood—most of the remaining Pacific moisture falls here in the form of rain or snow.

The remaining two-thirds of the state is relatively dry, classified as semi-arid, with large areas receiving no more than 12 inches (300 mm) a year. Exceptions occur at higher elevations in the Blue Mountains and the Wallowa Mountains to the northeast, which get 50 to 80 inches (1,300 to 2,000 mm) a year.

Across Oregon, the wet season runs from November through March, when the jet stream is strongest in the Northern Hemisphere. Precipitation is less in the months between winter and summer: April through June in the spring and September and October in the fall. Statewide, the dry months are July and August, when moisture arrives during afternoon thunderstorms, mainly in the mountains, and less often from storms that reach the north coast and adjacent counties.

=== Snow ===
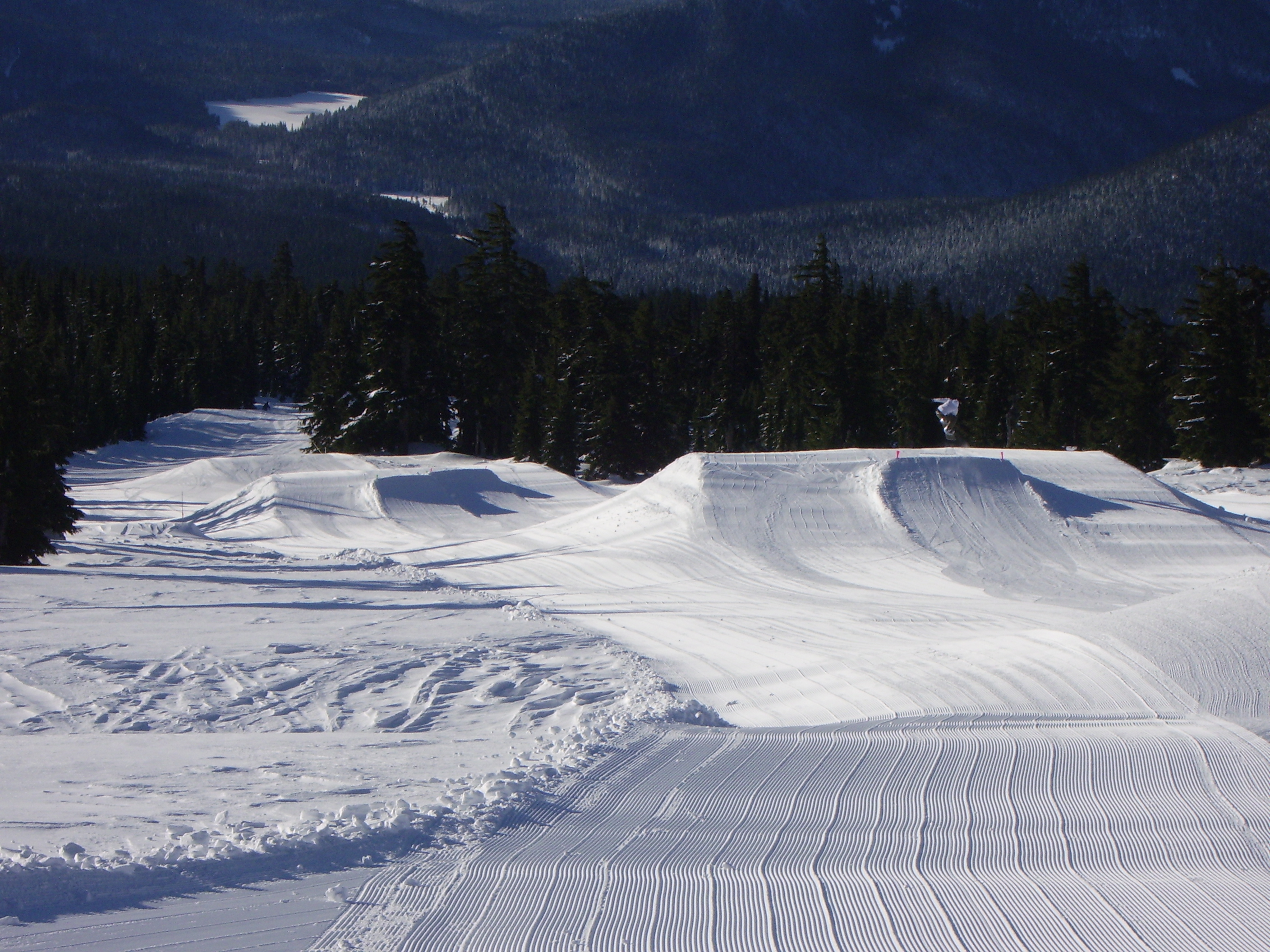
The heaviest snowfalls in Oregon occur in the Cascade Range.

Snowfall in Oregon is greatest in the Cascade Range. Based on data from ski resorts and a few official weather stations, average annual snowfall in the Cascades can range from 300 to 550 inches (760 to 1,400 cm). The state's largest annual snowfall on record, 903 inches (2,290 cm), occurred at Crater Lake in the Cascades in 1950. In the Blue Mountains of eastern Oregon, snowfall totals can also be large, between 150 and 300 inches (380 and 760 cm). On the other hand, most winter precipitation in the Coast Range falls as rain, though heavy snow sometimes occurs.

In most mountain areas in Oregon, the ground above 4,500 feet (1,400 m) is covered with snow from December through April. Snow depths, which vary with elevation and time of year, average an estimated 50 to 100 inches (130 to 250 cm) in the Cascades and 25 to 65 inches (64 to 165 cm) in the Blue Mountains at the end of January; by the end of April, they diminish to 40 to 120 inches (100 to 300 cm) in the Cascades and 5 to 45 inches (13 to 114 cm) in the Blues. Glaciers remain year-round on some Cascade peaks higher than 7,000 feet (2,100 m) above sea level.

Annual snowfall along the coastal plain averages 1 to 3 inches (2.5 to 7.6 cm) a year, including years with none. Further inland, between the Coast Range and the Cascades, snowfall generally averages from 5 to 10 inches (13 to 25 cm) a year. East of the Cascades, in non-mountain settings, the annual totals range from 15 to 75 inches (38 to 191 cm), depending on location; they are smallest in the north-central region and the Snake River basin in the southeast and largest in the northeastern valleys and in the high plateaus of the south-central part of the state.

== Temperature ==
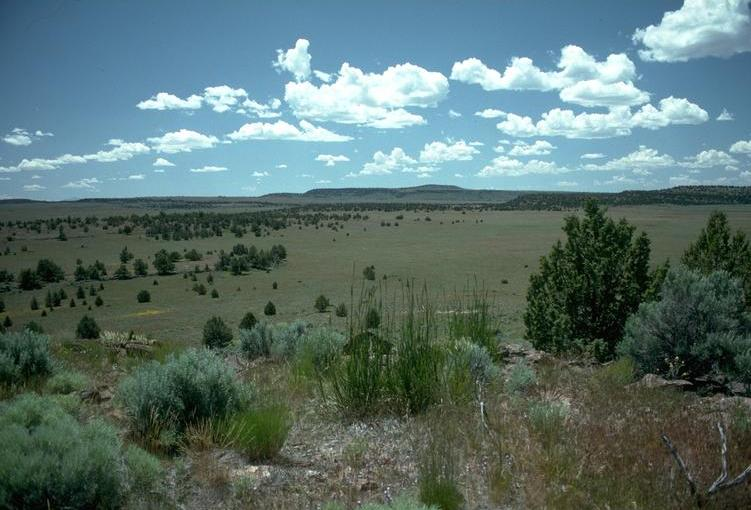
The High Desert region of Oregon

In addition to seasonal cycles in solar radiation (more in summer, less in winter), major factors affecting temperatures in Oregon include the moderating influence of the Pacific Ocean combined with variations in surface elevation, especially the Cascade Range. In general, temperatures on Earth drop by about 4 °F (2 °C) per each 1,000 feet (300 m) increase in elevation. Throughout the year, high elevations across the state tend to be cooler than low elevations. In addition, the Cascades, running north–south from border to border, generally retain relatively warm Pacific air masses on the western side of the state and relatively cool continental air masses on the eastern side. This prevailing pattern breaks down occasionally when dense cold air flows down the Columbia Gorge into the Willamette Valley and lowers temperatures more than usual from Portland to Eugene.

Oregon has a wide range of temperatures, though the extremes are rare. The highest was recorded on July 29, 1898, in Hermiston, Oregon, and again on August 10, 1898, in both Pendleton, Oregon and Redmond, Oregon, and once more on June 29, 2021, at Pelton Dam. All are east of the Cascades, when the temperature reached 119 °F (48 °C). The lowest occurred on February 9, 1933, in Ukiah, and again on February 10, 1933, in Seneca, also both east of the Cascades, when the temperature dropped to −54 °F (−48 °C). The temperature in the Willamette Valley is mild compared to the desert regions of the state, with high temperatures at or above 90 °F (32 °C) occurring only five to fifteen times per year, and low temperatures below 30 °F (−1 °C) similarly infrequent. The hottest area of the state is the southwest; Jackson County is the warmest place in the state during summer.

Climate data for Oregon
Month	Jan	Feb	Mar	Apr	May	Jun	Jul	Aug	Sep	Oct	Nov	Dec	Year
Record high °F (°C)	79 (26)	85 (29)	91 (33)	99 (37)	108 (42)	119 (48)	119 (48)	119 (48)	111 (44)	104 (40)	88 (31)	80 (27)	119 (48)
Record low °F (°C)	−52 (−47)	−54 (−48)	−30 (−34)	−6 (−21)	2 (−17)	10 (−12)	14 (−10)	13 (−11)	1 (−17)	−11 (−24)	−32 (−36)	−53 (−47)	−54 (−48)
Source: https://cdn.weathertogether.net/wp-content/uploads/sites/36/2023/12/17113309/OR_All-Time_Temperature-Extremes-by-Month_1889-Present_Updated-2023-12-17a.pdf

=== Extreme highs ===
Month	Temperature	Date	Location
January	79 °F (26 °C)	January 25, 2014	Port Orford, Curry County
February	85 °F (29 °C)	February 9, 2016	Coquille, Coos County
March	91 °F (33 °C)	March 31, 1911	Dayville, Grant County
April	99 °F (37 °C)	April 27 & 28, 1926	McMinnville, Yamhill County & Echo, Umatilla County
May	108 °F (42 °C)	May 16, 1924 & May 23, 2001	Blitzen, Harney County & Peyton Dam, Jefferson County
June	119 °F (48 °C)	June 29, 2021	Moody Farms Agrinet, Wasco County & Pelton Dam, Jefferson County
July	119 °F (48 °C)	July 29, 1898	Prineville, Crook County
August	119 °F (48 °C)	August 10, 1898	Pendleton, Umatilla County
September	111 °F (44 °C)	September 3, 1955 & 2022	Illahe, Curry County & Dayville, Grant County
October	104 °F (40 °C)	October 2 & 3, 1980	Dora, Coos County & Lost Creek Dam, Jackson County
November	88 °F (31 °C)	November 2, 1929	Brookings, Curry County
December	80 °F (27 °C)	December 15, 1980	Port Orford, Curry County

=== Extreme lows ===
Month	Temperature	Date	Location
January	−52 °F (−47 °C)	January 21, 1930 & January 8, 1937	Danner, Malheur County & Austin, Grant County
February	−54 °F (−48 °C)	February 9 & 10, 1933	Ukiah, Umatilla County & Seneca, Grant County
March	−30 °F (−34 °C)	March 1, 1922	Fremont, Lake County
April	−6 °F (−21 °C)	April 1, 1936	Sand Creek, Klamath County
May	2 °F (−17 °C)	May 2, 2013	Madras, Jefferson County
June	10 °F (−12 °C)	June 3, 1931	Fremont, Lake County
July	14 °F (−10 °C)	July 2, 1955	Fremont, Lake County
August	13 °F (−11 °C)	August 28, 1937	Seneca, Grant County
September	1 °F (−17 °C)	September 28, 1931	Seneca, Grant County
October	−11 °F (−24 °C)	October 31, 2002	Seneca, Grant County & Fort Rock, Lake County
November	−32 °F (−36 °C)	November 26-27, 1896 & November 23, 1985	Silver Lake, Lake County & Ukiah, Umatilla County
December	−53 °F (−47 °C)	December 15 & 24-25, 1924	Drewsey, Harney County & Riverside, Malheur County

== Selected climate charts ==
Map of locations in the charts below

Astoria

Climate chart (precipitation, max. and min. temperature)
J	F	M	A	M	J	J	A	S	O	N	D
10 50 38	7.2 52 37	7.5 54 39	5.2 56 41	3.3 60 46	2.6 64 50	1 67 53	1.2 69 53	2.1 68 49	6 61 44	11 54 40	9.9 49 37
- █ Average max. and min. temperatures in °F
- █ Precipitation totals in inches
Metric conversion
J	F	M	A	M	J	J	A	S	O	N	D
259 10 3	183 11 3	189 12 4	132 14 5	84 16 8	65 18 10	26 20 12	29 20 12	54 20 10	152 16 7	283 12 5	251 9 3
- █ Average max. and min. temperatures in °C
- █ Precipitation totals in mm

Bend

Climate chart (precipitation, max. and min. temperature)
J	F	M	A	M	J	J	A	S	O	N	D
1.5 41 24	1.1 44 24	0.7 51 28	0.7 57 30	0.9 65 36	0.8 72 42	0.6 82 48	0.5 81 46	0.4 74 40	0.6 62 33	1.4 47 28	2.1 39 23
- █ Average max. and min. temperatures in °F
- █ Precipitation totals in inches
Metric conversion
J	F	M	A	M	J	J	A	S	O	N	D
37 5 −4	29 7 −4	18 11 −3	18 14 −1	22 18 2	20 22 6	14 28 9	12 27 8	10 23 4	15 17 0	35 9 −2	54 4 −5
- █ Average max. and min. temperatures in °C
- █ Precipitation totals in mm

Brookings

Climate chart (precipitation, max. and min. temperature)
J	F	M	A	M	J	J	A	S	O	N	D
12 55 42	10 56 43	9.4 58 43	6.5 60 44	3.9 63 47	2 67 50	0.4 68 52	0.7 68 53	1.4 64 51	5.4 64 48	11 58 45	15 55 42
- █ Average max. and min. temperatures in °F
- █ Precipitation totals in inches
Metric conversion
J	F	M	A	M	J	J	A	S	O	N	D
301 13 6	253 13 6	240 14 6	164 15 7	98 17 8	51 19 10	11 20 11	18 20 12	35 18 11	136 18 9	285 14 7	369 13 5
- █ Average max. and min. temperatures in °C
- █ Precipitation totals in mm

Burns

Climate chart (precipitation, max. and min. temperature)
J	F	M	A	M	J	J	A	S	O	N	D
1.2 35 15	1 39 18	1.1 49 25	0.9 57 29	1.2 66 36	0.8 75 42	0.4 86 47	0.4 85 45	0.4 76 36	0.8 62 28	1.2 45 22	1.6 34 14
- █ Average max. and min. temperatures in °F
- █ Precipitation totals in inches
Metric conversion
J	F	M	A	M	J	J	A	S	O	N	D
30 2 −10	26 4 −8	28 10 −4	24 14 −2	31 19 2	19 24 5	10 30 9	9.1 29 7	11 24 2	20 17 −3	30 7 −6	39 1 −10
- █ Average max. and min. temperatures in °C
- █ Precipitation totals in mm

Eugene

Climate chart (precipitation, max. and min. temperature)
J	F	M	A	M	J	J	A	S	O	N	D
6.9 47 35	5.4 51 35	5 56 37	3.3 61 40	2.7 67 44	1.5 73 48	0.6 82 52	0.6 83 51	1.3 77 47	3.3 64 42	7.7 52 38	7.8 46 34
- █ Average max. and min. temperatures in °F
- █ Precipitation totals in inches
Metric conversion
J	F	M	A	M	J	J	A	S	O	N	D
175 8 1	138 11 2	127 13 3	85 16 4	69 19 7	38 23 9	14 28 11	15 28 11	33 25 9	83 18 5	196 11 3	199 8 1
- █ Average max. and min. temperatures in °C
- █ Precipitation totals in mm

Medford

Climate chart (precipitation, max. and min. temperature)
J	F	M	A	M	J	J	A	S	O	N	D
2.4 48 32	2 54 34	1.7 59 36	1.4 65 40	1.3 73 45	0.6 82 51	0.3 92 57	0.4 91 56	0.6 84 49	1.1 70 42	3 53 36	3.5 46 30
- █ Average max. and min. temperatures in °F
- █ Precipitation totals in inches
Metric conversion
J	F	M	A	M	J	J	A	S	O	N	D
61 9 0	51 12 1	43 15 2	35 18 4	33 23 7	16 28 11	7.1 33 14	10 33 13	14 29 9	29 21 6	76 12 2	89 8 −1
- █ Average max. and min. temperatures in °C
- █ Precipitation totals in mm

Newport

Climate chart (precipitation, max. and min. temperature)
J	F	M	A	M	J	J	A	S	O	N	D
11 50 38	8.1 52 39	8.2 54 40	4.9 56 41	3.5 59 45	2.7 62 49	1 64 50	1.3 65 51	2.6 65 49	5.4 61 46	11 55 42	12 51 39
- █ Average max. and min. temperatures in °F
- █ Precipitation totals in inches
Metric conversion
J	F	M	A	M	J	J	A	S	O	N	D
270 10 3	206 11 4	209 12 4	125 13 5	89 15 7	68 17 9	25 18 10	32 18 11	67 18 9	138 16 8	276 13 6	299 11 4
- █ Average max. and min. temperatures in °C
- █ Precipitation totals in mm

Ontario

Climate chart (precipitation, max. and min. temperature)
J	F	M	A	M	J	J	A	S	O	N	D
1.3 34 18	0.9 43 24	1 55 31	0.7 65 37	0.9 74 45	0.6 84 51	0.3 93 57	0.3 91 54	0.5 81 45	0.6 66 34	1.2 47 27	1.4 36 20
- █ Average max. and min. temperatures in °F
- █ Precipitation totals in inches
Metric conversion
J	F	M	A	M	J	J	A	S	O	N	D
33 1 −8	22 6 −4	24 13 −1	17 18 3	24 23 7	16 29 11	7.6 34 14	7.1 33 12	12 27 7	14 19 1	30 8 −3	36 2 −7
- █ Average max. and min. temperatures in °C
- █ Precipitation totals in mm

Pendleton

Climate chart (precipitation, max. and min. temperature)
J	F	M	A	M	J	J	A	S	O	N	D
1.4 42 29	1.1 47 30	1.3 55 35	1.2 62 39	1.3 70 46	1 78 52	0.3 88 57	0.4 87 57	0.6 77 49	1 64 40	1.5 49 33	1.5 40 27
- █ Average max. and min. temperatures in °F
- █ Precipitation totals in inches
Metric conversion
J	F	M	A	M	J	J	A	S	O	N	D
37 5 −2	28 8 −1	34 13 2	30 17 4	34 21 8	25 26 11	8.1 31 14	9.7 30 14	14 25 10	26 18 5	39 10 1	37 4 −3
- █ Average max. and min. temperatures in °C
- █ Precipitation totals in mm

Portland

Climate chart (precipitation, max. and min. temperature)
J	F	M	A	M	J	J	A	S	O	N	D
4.9 47 36	3.7 51 36	3.7 57 40	2.7 61 43	2.5 68 49	1.7 74 54	0.7 81 58	0.7 81 58	1.5 76 53	3 64 46	5.6 53 41	5.5 46 35
- █ Average max. and min. temperatures in °F
- █ Precipitation totals in inches
Metric conversion
J	F	M	A	M	J	J	A	S	O	N	D
124 8 2	93 11 2	93 14 4	69 16 6	63 20 9	43 23 12	17 27 14	17 27 14	37 24 12	76 18 8	143 12 5	139 8 2
- █ Average max. and min. temperatures in °C
- █ Precipitation totals in mm

== See also ==
- Climate of the United States
- Climate change in Oregon
