= Alan Austerman =

American politician (born 1943)

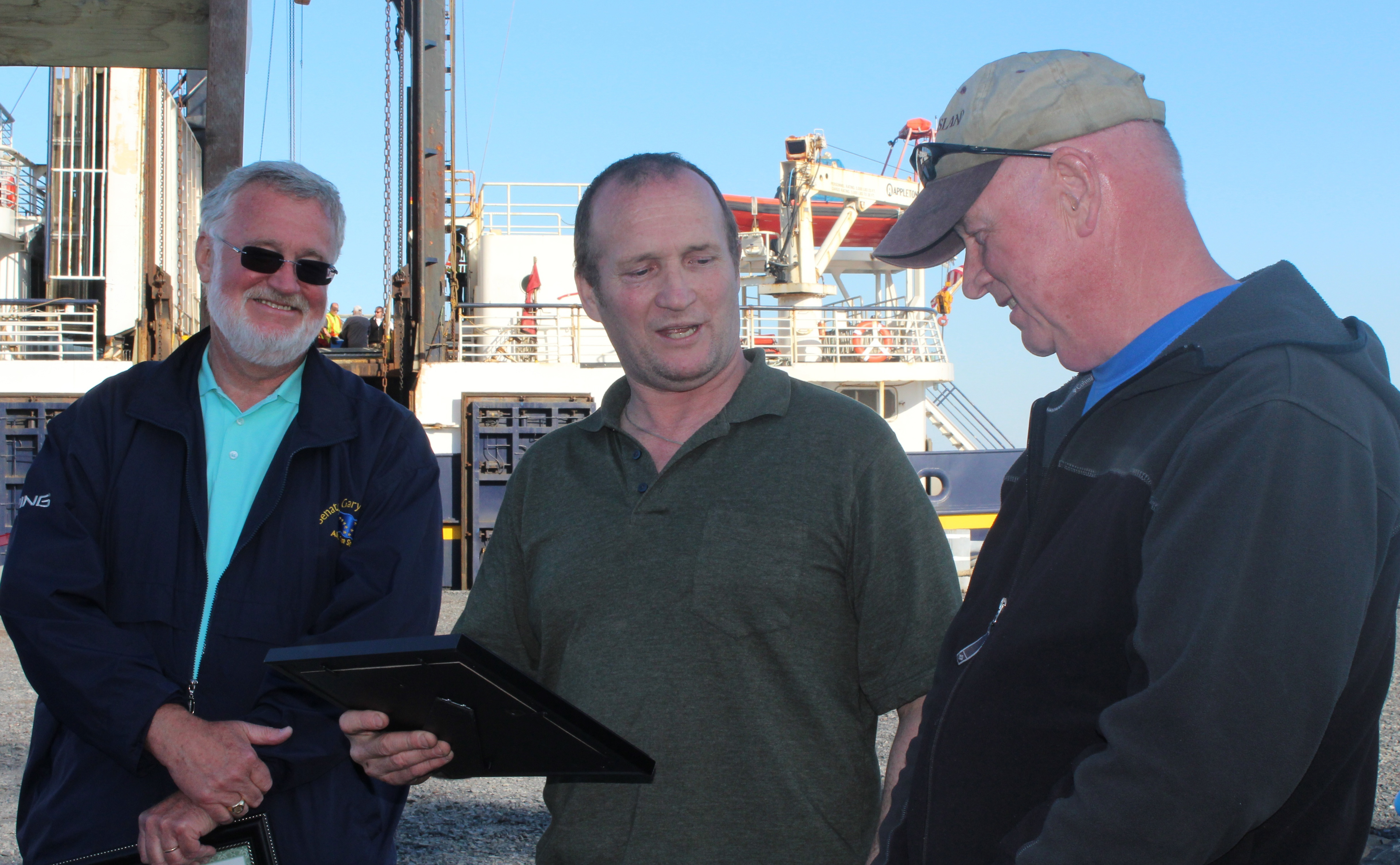
- Alan Austerman (right) with Gary Stevens and Mayor Dan Clarion in Ouzinkie, June 2012.

Majority Leader of the Alaska House of Representatives
- In office November 11, 2010 – 2012
- Preceded by: Kyle Johansen
- Succeeded by: Lance Pruitt

Member of the Alaska House of Representatives from the 36th district
- In office January 20, 2009 – January 20, 2015
- Preceded by: Gabrielle LeDoux
- Succeeded by: Louise Stutes

Member of the Alaska Senate from the R district
- In office January 21, 2003 – February 10, 2003
- Preceded by: (redistricting took effect)
- Succeeded by: Gary Stevens

Member of the Alaska Senate from the C district
- In office January 8, 2001 – January 20, 2003
- Preceded by: Jerry Mackie
- Succeeded by: (redistricting takes effect)

Member of the Alaska House of Representatives from the 6th district
- In office January 16, 1995 – January 7, 2001
- Preceded by: Cliff Davidson
- Succeeded by: Gary Stevens

Personal details
- Born: May 23, 1943 (age 83) Everett, Washington, U.S.
- Party: Republican
- Spouse: Virginia
- Children: Carol; Dawn
- Occupation: Consultant/Lobbyist
- Profession: business owner-operator

Military service
- Allegiance: United States of America
- Branch/service: United States Army
- Years of service: 1964–1971
- Rank: Sergeant
- Unit: Alaska National Guard

Alan David Austerman (born May 23, 1943) is an American politician who served as a member of the Alaska House of Representatives and Alaska Senate.

== Early life and education ==
Austerman was born in Everett, Washington. He graduated from Kodiak High School in 1961.

== Career ==
Austerman served as the Majority Leader of the Alaska House of Representatives. He also served on the Fisheries, Military and Veterans Affairs, and Community and Regional Affairs committees of the House of Representatives of the 27th Legislature. Alan Austerman previously served as an Alaska State Senator from 2001 to 2003. He resigned from the Senate to become the Fisheries Policy Advisor to Governor Frank Murkowski. Before that he represented the 6th district in the House from 1995 to 2001.

Austerman's daughter Carol ran for his seat in the House of Representatives upon his retirement in 2014. She lost in the Republican primary to Louise Stutes.

== Personal life ==
Austerman and his wife, Ginny, and two children, Carol and Dawn.

He is the current owner of Alan Austerman Consulting and Lobbyist Services. He served from 1964 to 1971 in the Alaska National Guard achieving the rank of Sergeant. He has also served as Police Officer in the Kodiak Police Department and was also a Commercial Fisherman. He also published and co-owned the Kadiak Times newspaper at one point.
