= Bart LeBon =

American politician and banker

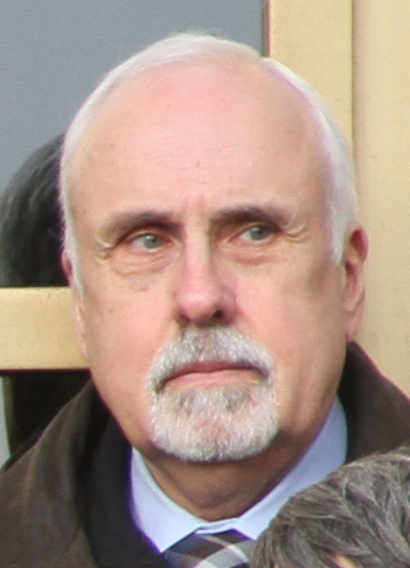

Member of the Alaska House of Representatives from the 1st district
- In office January 15, 2019 – January 17, 2023
- Preceded by: Scott Kawasaki
- Succeeded by: Maxine Dibert (redistricting)

Personal details
- Born: 1952 or 1953 (age 73–74) Sioux Falls, South Dakota, U.S.
- Party: Republican
- Education: University of Alaska Fairbanks

Barton S. "Bart" LeBon (born 1952 or 1953) is an American politician and retired banker who served as a member of the Alaska House of Representatives from 2019 to 2023. He defeated Democrat Kathryn Dodge in the 2018 Alaska elections by a margin of only one vote.

== Electoral history ==
=== 2024 ===
==== Primary ====
2024 Nonpartisan primary
Party	Candidate	Votes	%
Democratic	Maxine Dibert (incumbent)	1,109	51.5
Republican	Bart LeBon	1,045	48.5
Total votes		2,154	100.0

==== General ====
2024 Alaska House of Representatives election, District 31
Party	Candidate	Votes	%
Democratic	Maxine Dibert (incumbent)	3,518	54.2
Republican	Bart LeBon	2,948	45.5
Write-in		20	0.3
Total votes		6,486	100.0
Democratic hold			
