= Climate change in Oregon =

Climate change in the US state of Oregon

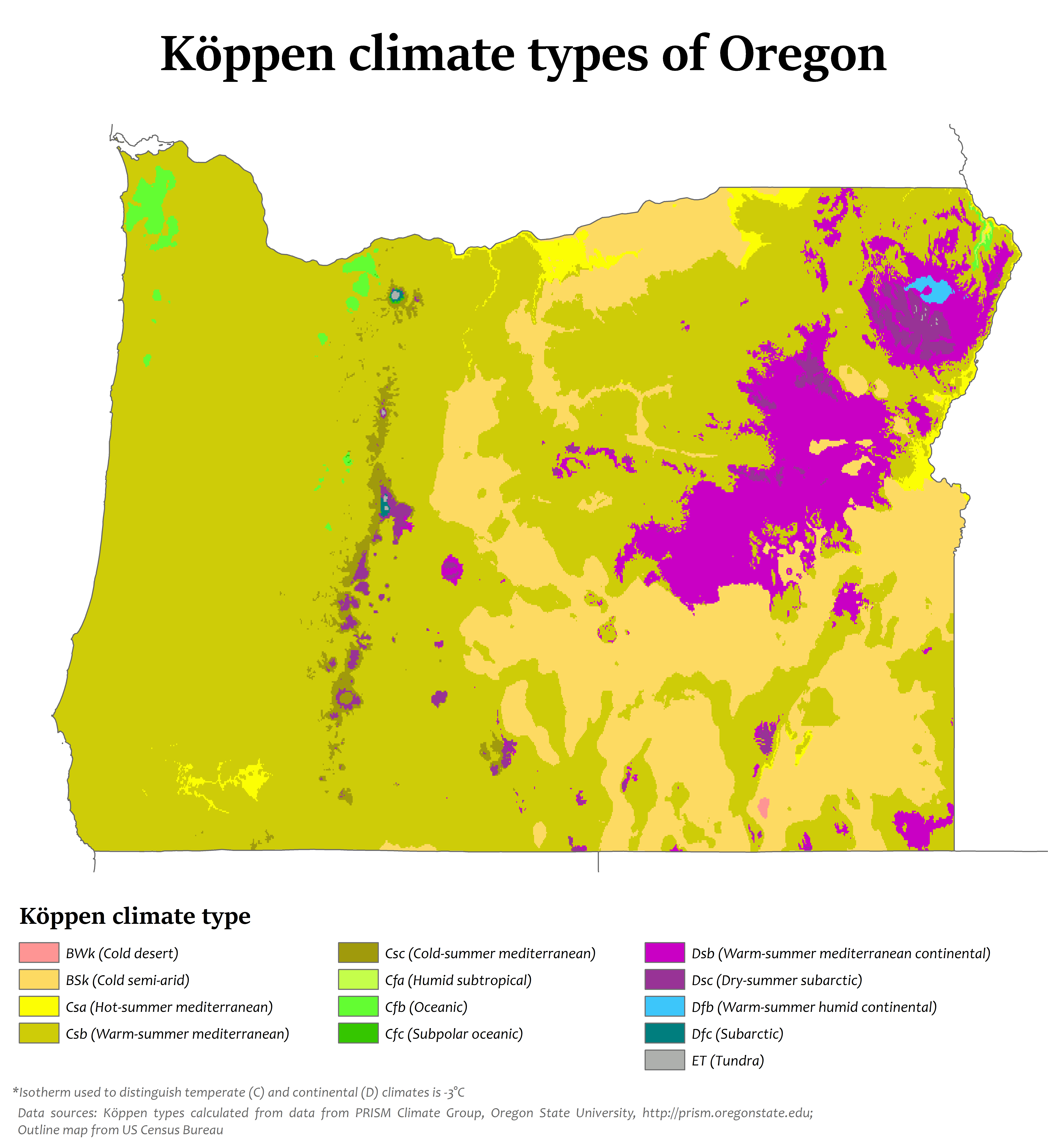
Köppen climate types in Oregon, showing that most of the state is warm-summer mediterranean, with significant pockets of cold semi-arid and warm-summer Mediterranean continental.

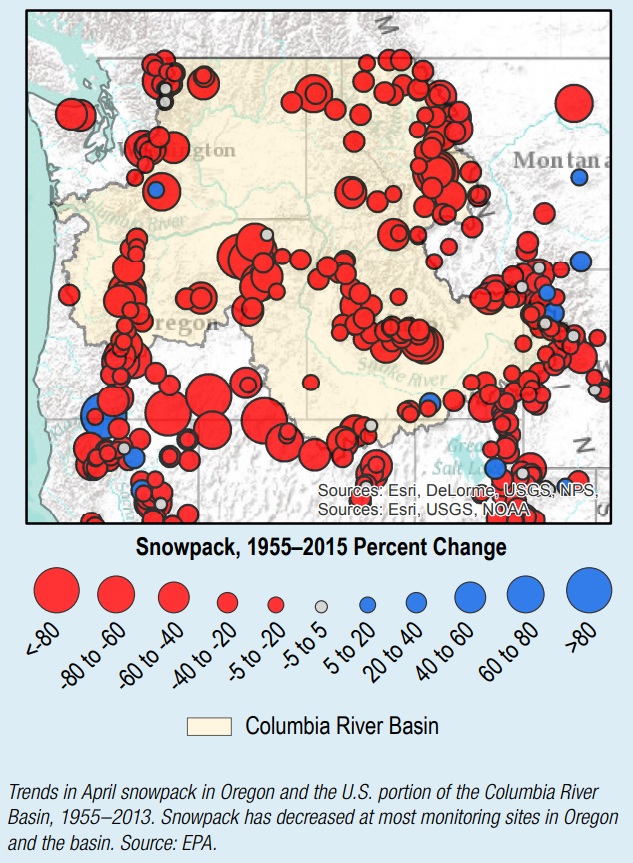
Snowpack decline over time in Oregon and surrounding states.

Climate change in Oregon encompasses the effects of climate change, attributed to man-made increases in atmospheric carbon dioxide, in the U.S. state of Oregon.

The United States Environmental Protection Agency reports: "Oregon's climate is changing. Over the past century, most of the state has warmed about two degrees (F). Snowpack is melting earlier in the year, and the flow of meltwater into streams during summer is declining. In the coming decades, coastal waters will become more acidic, streams will be warmer, wildfires may be more common, and some rangelands may convert to desert".

== Environmental impacts ==
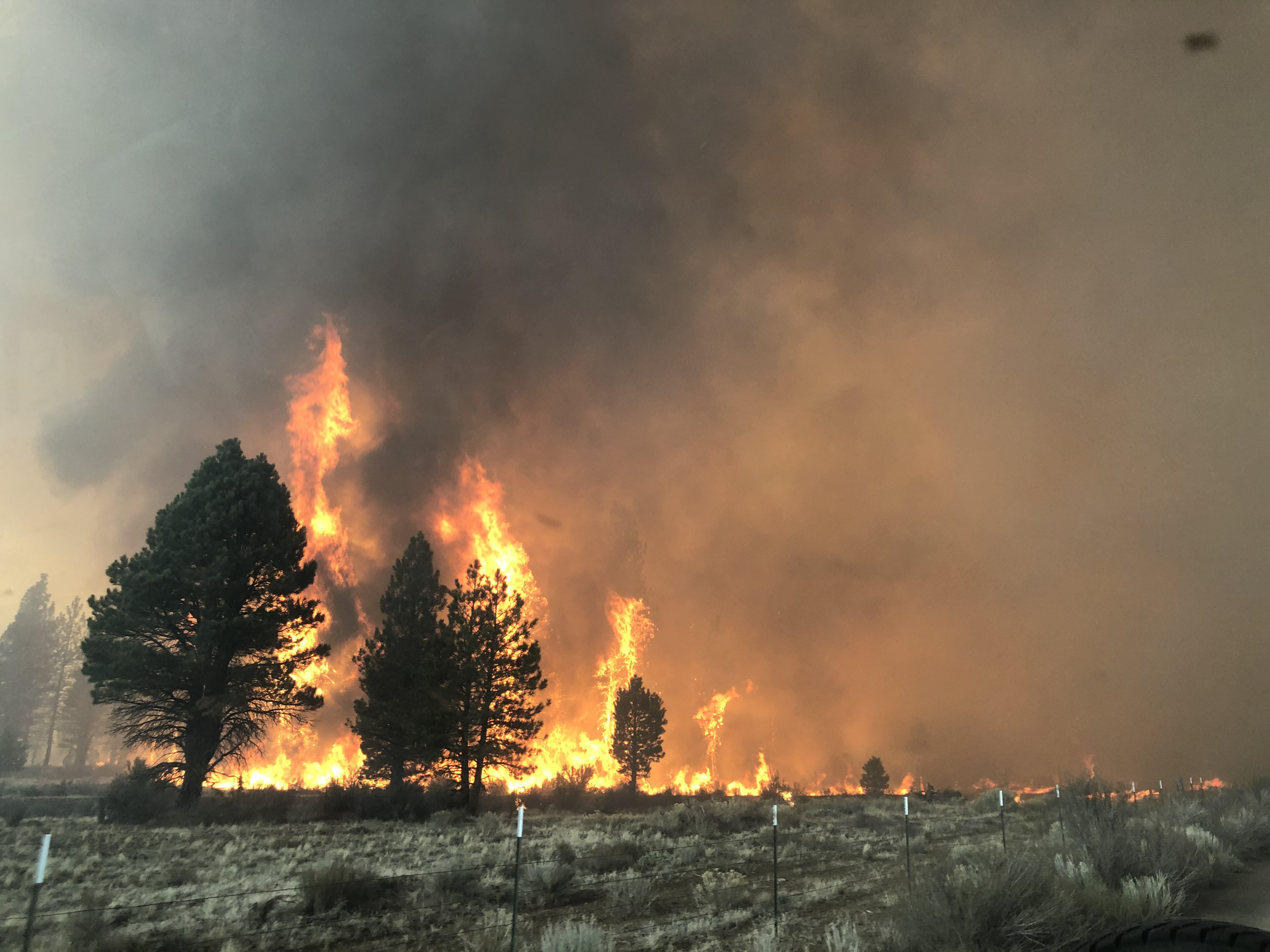
Ponina Fire, 2021

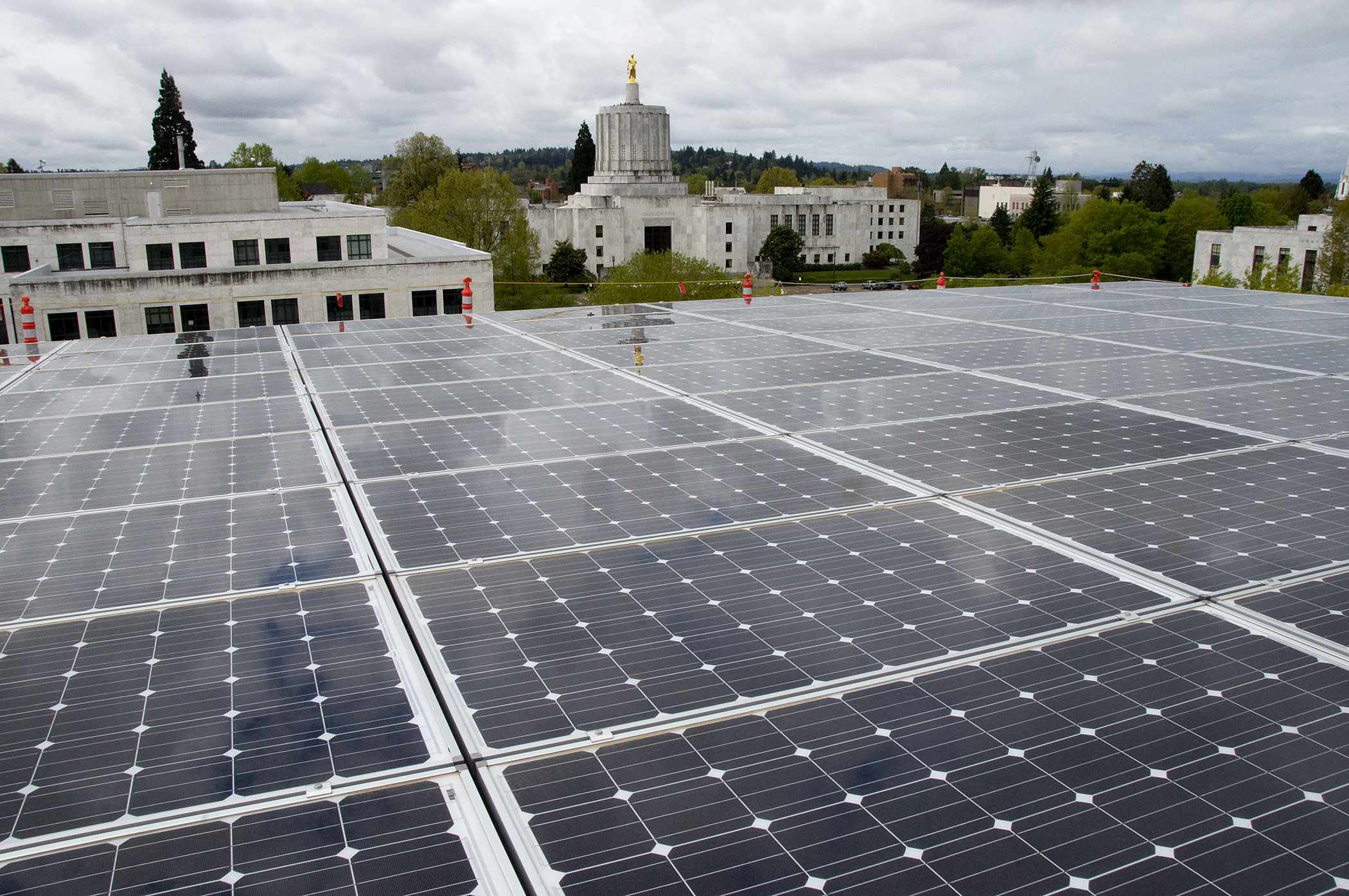
Solar panel installation, Salem

=== Marine and coastal ecosystems ===
"Oregon's coastal waters are vulnerable to acidification. The ocean here is more acidic than most of the ocean, because nearby currents bring relatively acidic water from the deep ocean to the surface, especially during spring and summer. Increasing acidity impairs the ability of some types of shellfish to capture minerals in the water to build their shells, which can lead to thinner shells—or even prevent shells from forming. At the Whiskey Creek Hatchery in Netarts Bay, for example, acidic seawater during spawning has reduced the growth rates and survival of young oysters. Acidity also thins the exoskeletons of many species of plankton, which could reduce the population of those plankton and the fish that feed on them and alter the entire marine food web. For example, young salmon eat some of the types of shellfish and plankton that are vulnerable to acidification. Rising ocean temperatures may also harm marine ecosystems. Warming waters can increase the frequency of toxic algae blooms (such as “red tide”) that cause shellfish poisoning and lead to closures of beaches and shellfish beds. Warmer waters also allow invasive species from southern waters to move northward".

"Sea level rise will threaten coastal development and ecosystems. Erosion will threaten homes and public property along the shore. Mudflats, marshes, and other tidal wetlands provide habitats for birds and fish. As water levels rise, wetlands and beaches may be submerged or squeezed between the rising sea and structures erected to protect coastal development".

=== Snowpack, streamflows, and water availability ===
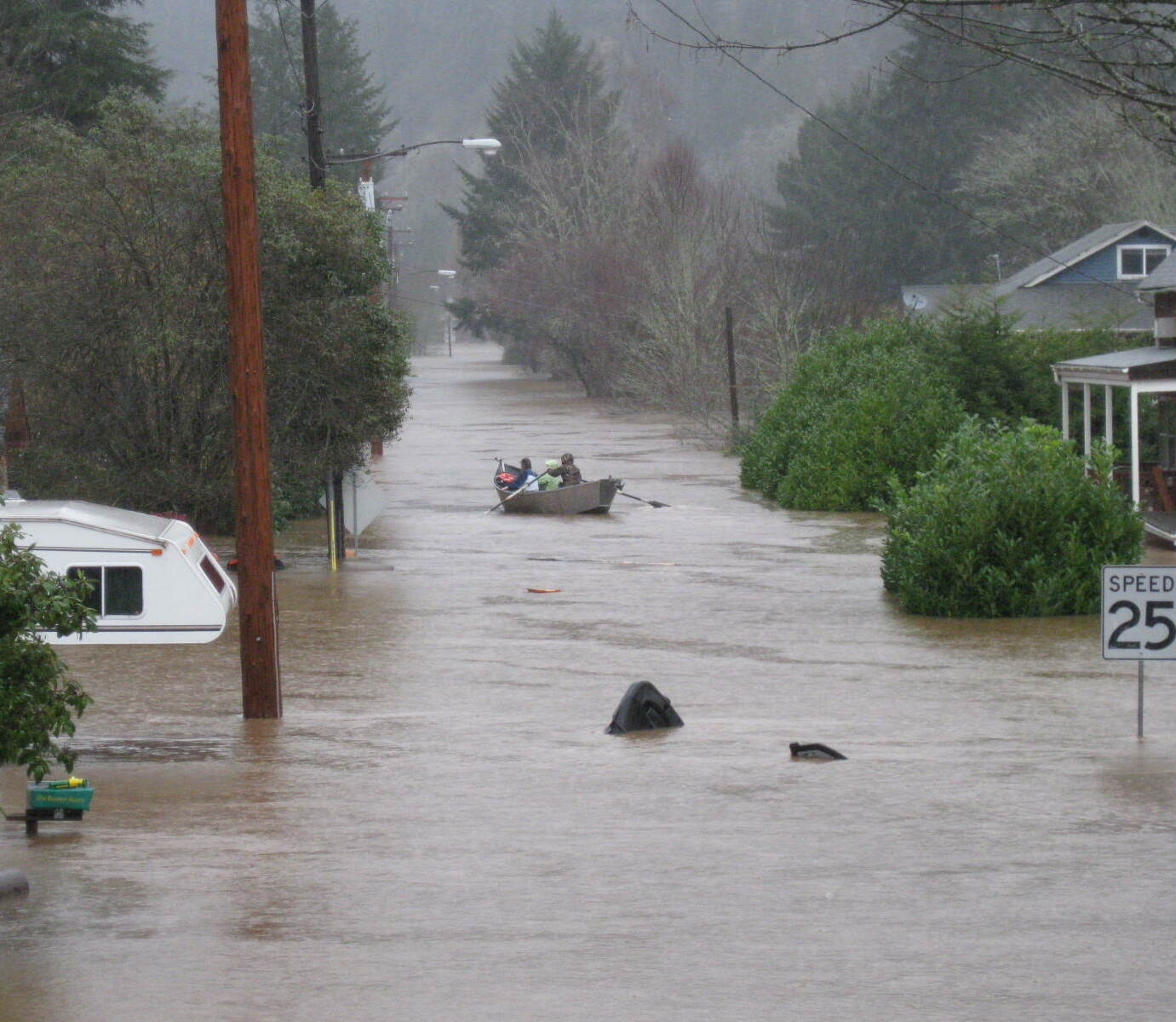
Flooded road, Mapleton

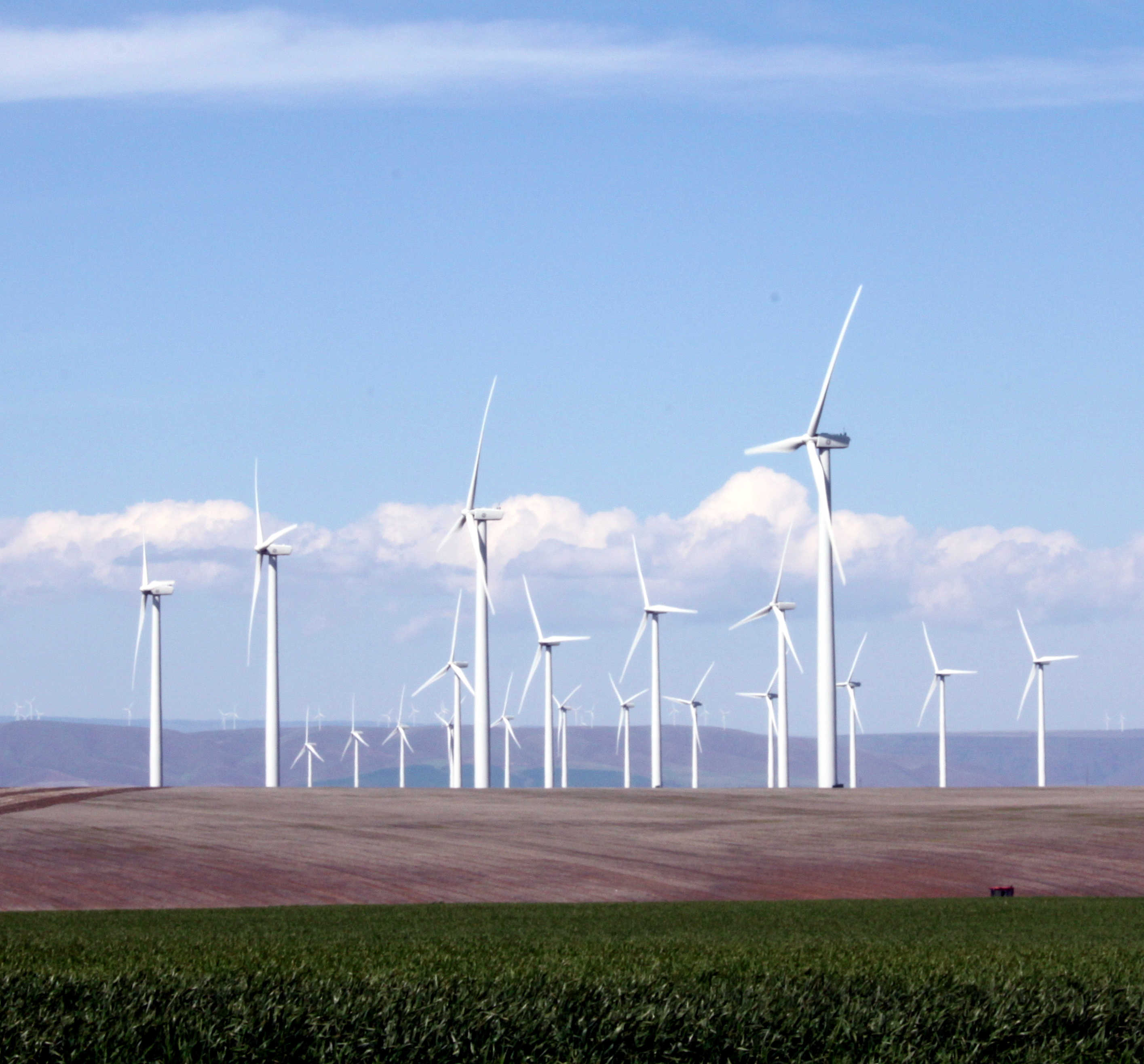
Klondike Wind Farm

"The flows of water in rivers and streams are increasing during late winter and early spring but decreasing during summer. Warmer winters have reduced average snowpack in the Cascades by 20 percent since 1950. The snowpack is now melting a few weeks earlier than during the 20th century, and, by 2050, the snow is likely to melt three to four weeks earlier. Decreasing snowpack means there will be less water flowing through streams during summer. Moreover, rising temperatures increase the rate at which water evaporates (or transpires) into the air from soils and plants. More evaporation means that less water will drain from the ground into rivers and streams".

"Declining snow and streamflow would harm some economic sectors and aquatic ecosystems. Less snow means a shorter season for skiing and other winter recreation. Water temperatures will rise, which would hurt Chinook and sockeye salmon in the interior Columbia River Basin. The combination of warmer water and lower flows would threaten salmon, steelhead, and trout. Lower flows would also mean less hydroelectric power".

=== Wildfires and landscape change ===
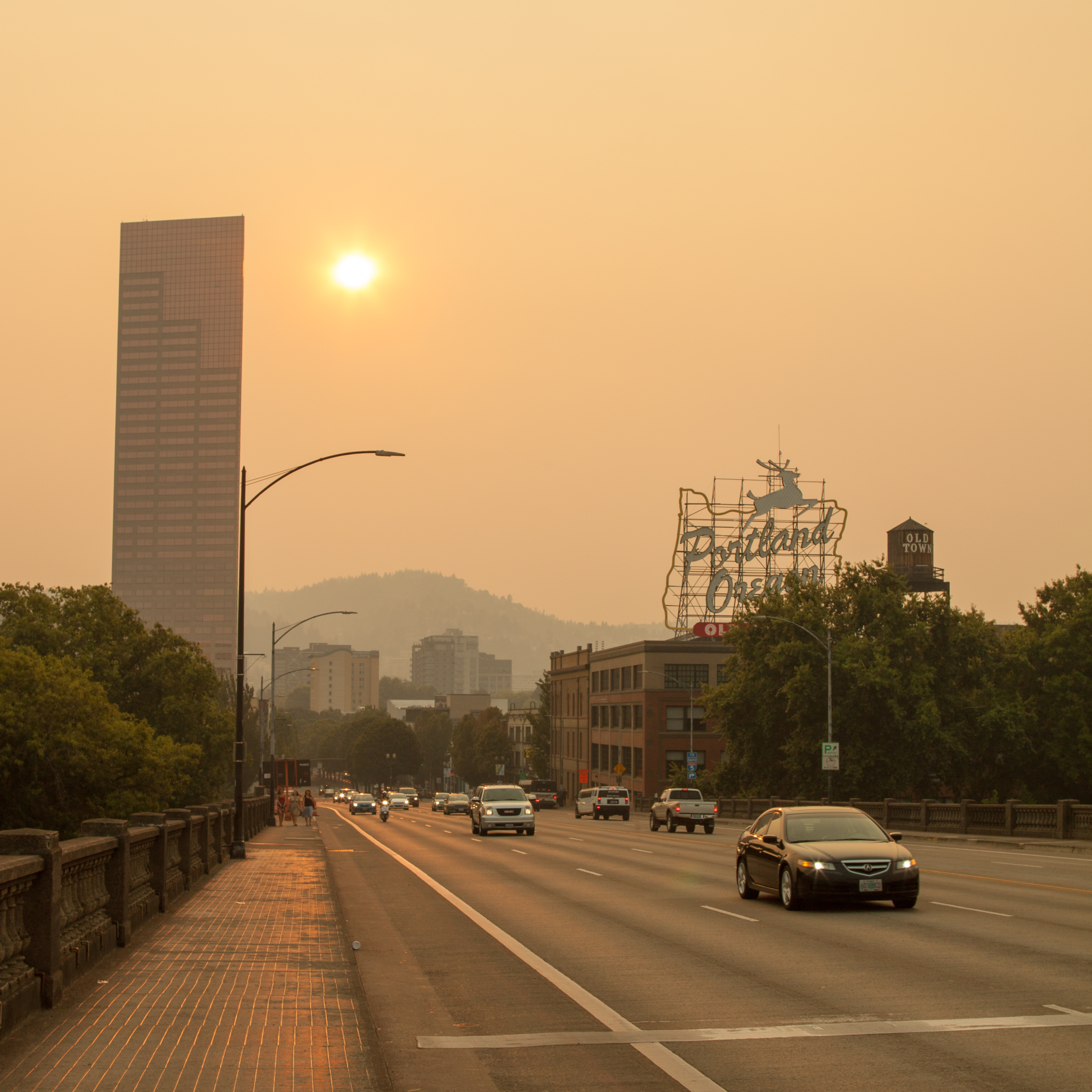
Air pollution on the Portland skyline during 2015 Oregon wildfires

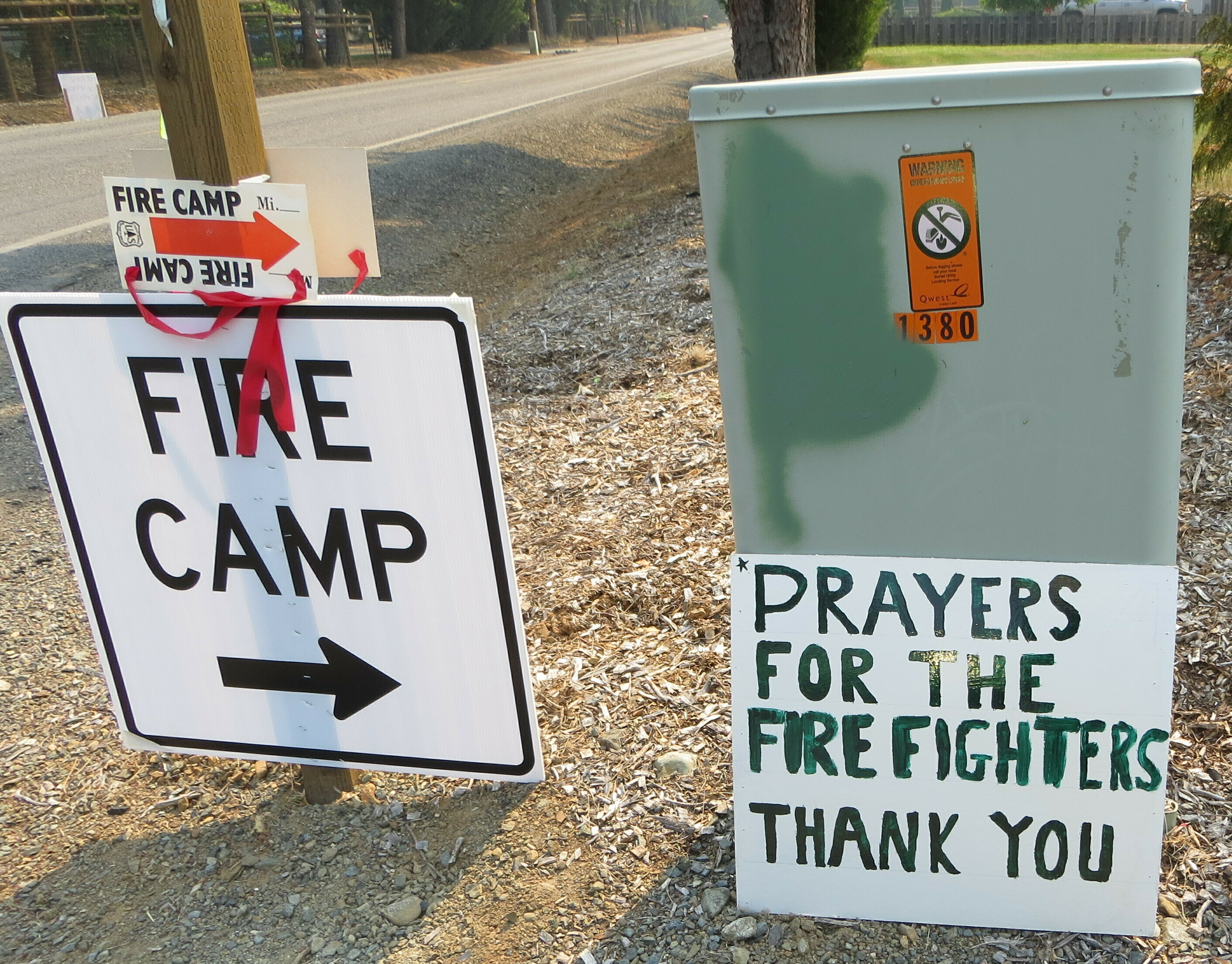
Sign praying for firefighters, Big Windy Complex fire, 2013

"Climate change can increase the frequency and severity of fires that burn forests, grasslands, and desert vegetation. Since 1984, about 4 percent of the land in Oregon has burned per decade. The changing climate is likely to more than double the area in the Northwest burned by forest fires during an average year by the end of the 21 st century. Although drier soils alone increase the risk of wildfire, many other factors contribute to fires, and forests in the Western Cascades may be less vulnerable to climate change than those in the Eastern Cascades".

"Higher temperatures and a lack of water can also make trees more susceptible to pests and disease, and trees damaged or killed burn more readily than living trees. For example, climate change is likely to increase the area of pine forests in the Northwest infested with mountain pine beetles in the next few decades. Pine beetles and wildfires are each likely to decrease timber harvests. Increasing wildfires also threaten homes and pollute the air".

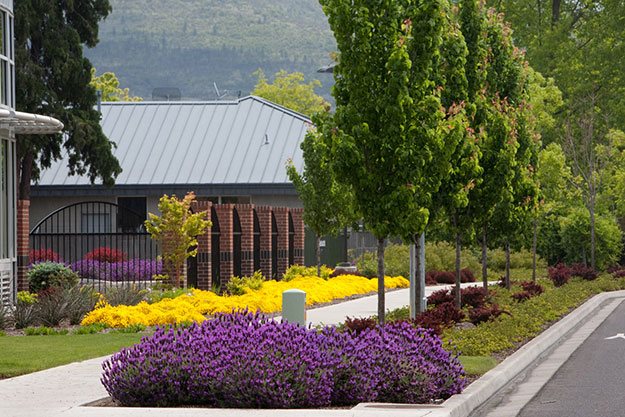
Drought-tolerant landscaping, Medford

"The combination of more fires and drier conditions may expand deserts and otherwise change the landscape in the dry eastern portion of the state. Many plants and animals living in arid lands are already near the limits of what they can tolerate. Warmer temperatures and a drier climate would generally extend the geographic range of the Great Basin desert. In some cases, native vegetation may persist and delay or prevent the expansion of the desert. In other cases, fires or livestock grazing may accelerate the conversion of grassland to the desert in response to the changing climate. For similar reasons, some forests may change to desert or grassland".

== Economic and social impacts ==
=== Agriculture ===
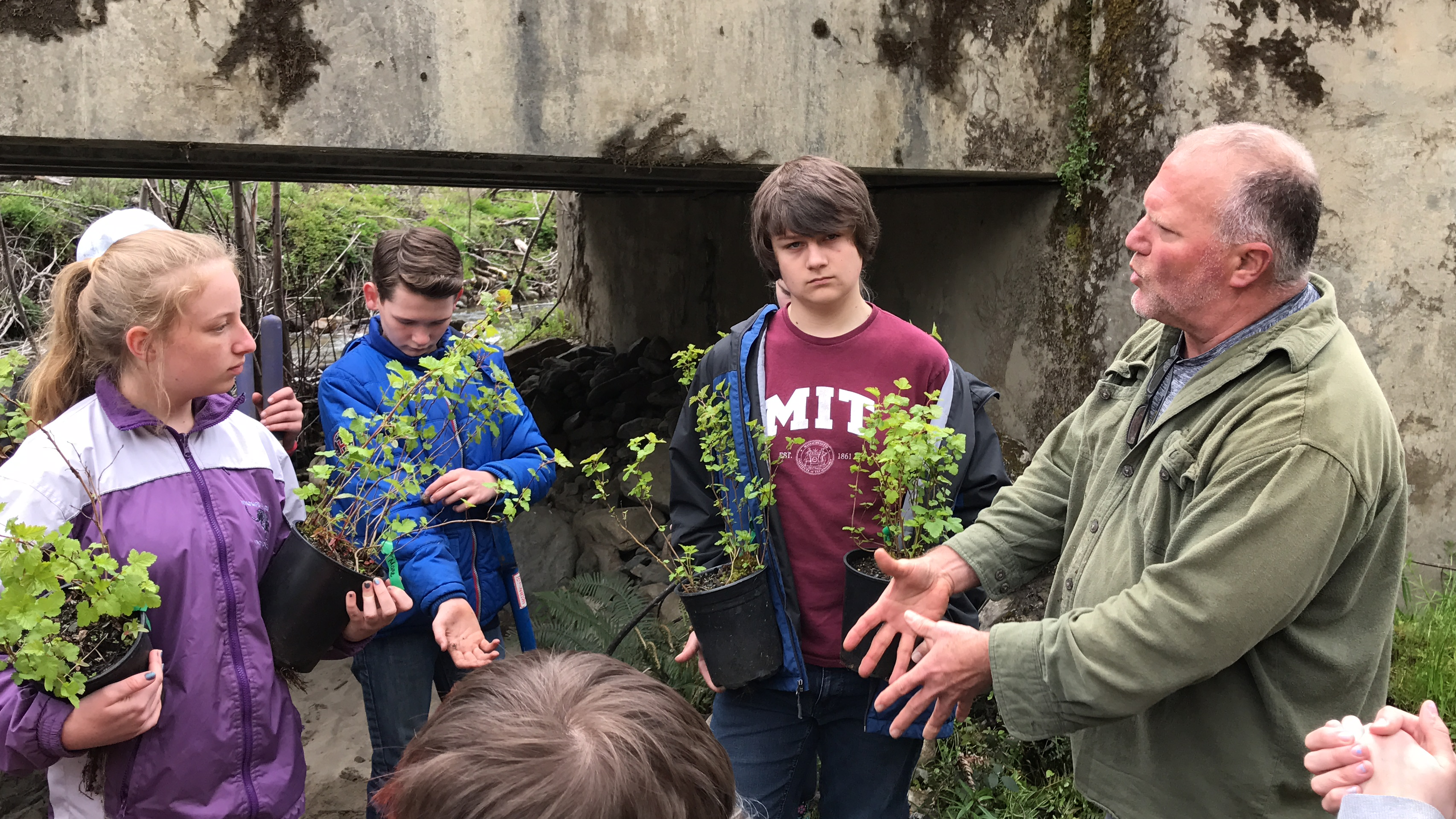
Schoolchildren replanting after a wildfire, 2017

"Climate change may also pose challenges for livestock and crops. Higher temperatures cause cows to eat less, grow more slowly, and produce less milk, and in extreme cases may threaten their health. Some farms may be harmed if more hot days reduce crop yields, or if the decline in summer streamflow reduces the water available for irrigation. Other farms may benefit from a longer growing season and the fertilizing effect of carbon dioxide".

== Response ==
=== Policy response ===
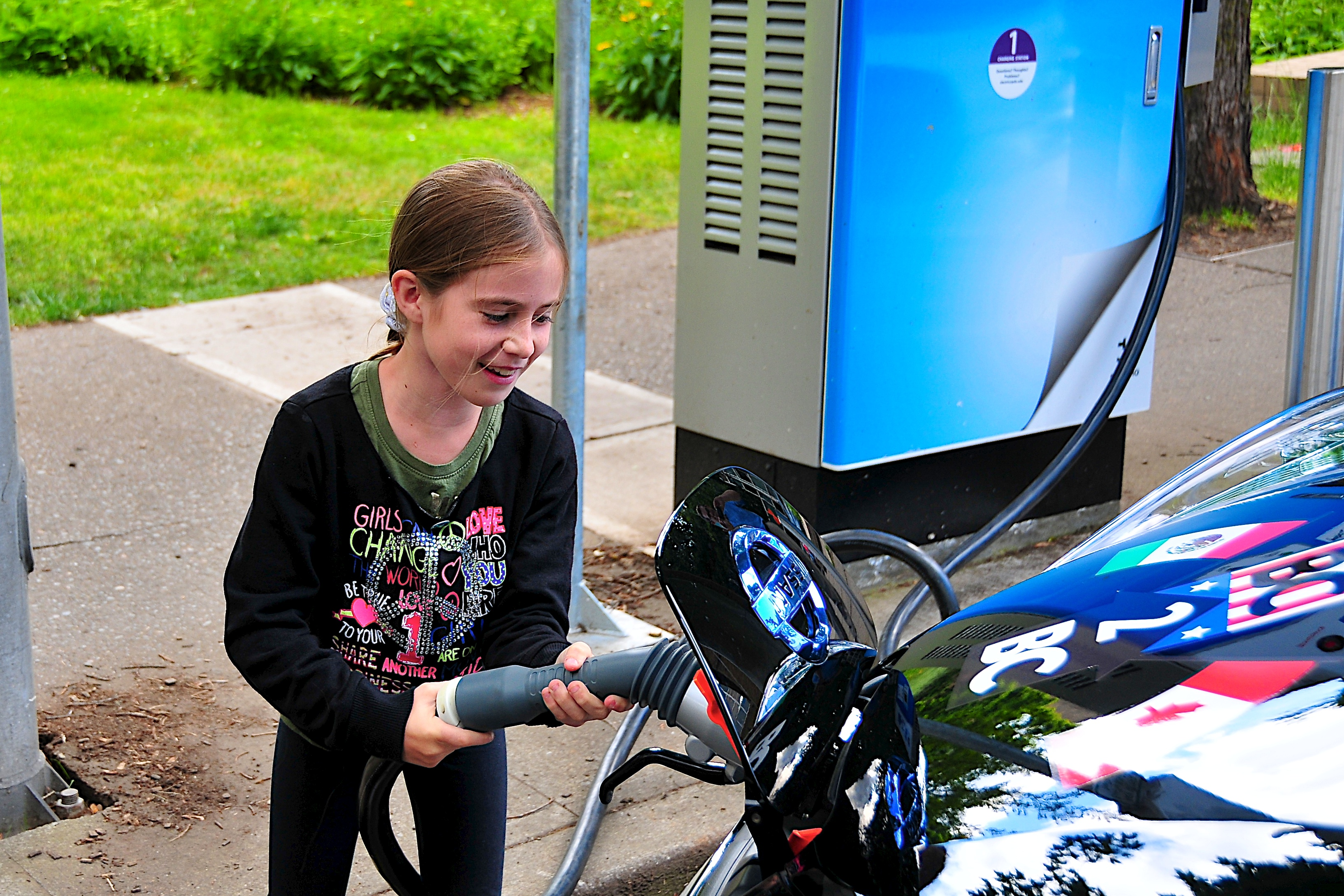
Electric vehicle charging

The Oregon House of Representatives brought a climate-related bill to vote in 2019, after state Democrats gained a supermajority in the House. The bill was written to build a state cap-and-trade plan to reduce emissions 45 percent below 1990 levels by 2035 and 80 percent by 2050. However, a walkout by republicans meant that there were not enough representatives to take a vote, regardless of whether or not the bill would have passed. After learning that Oregon Senate Democrats had insufficient votes to pass the bill, Oregon Republican Senate Leader Herman Baertschiger Jr. announced the intention to return to the capitol.

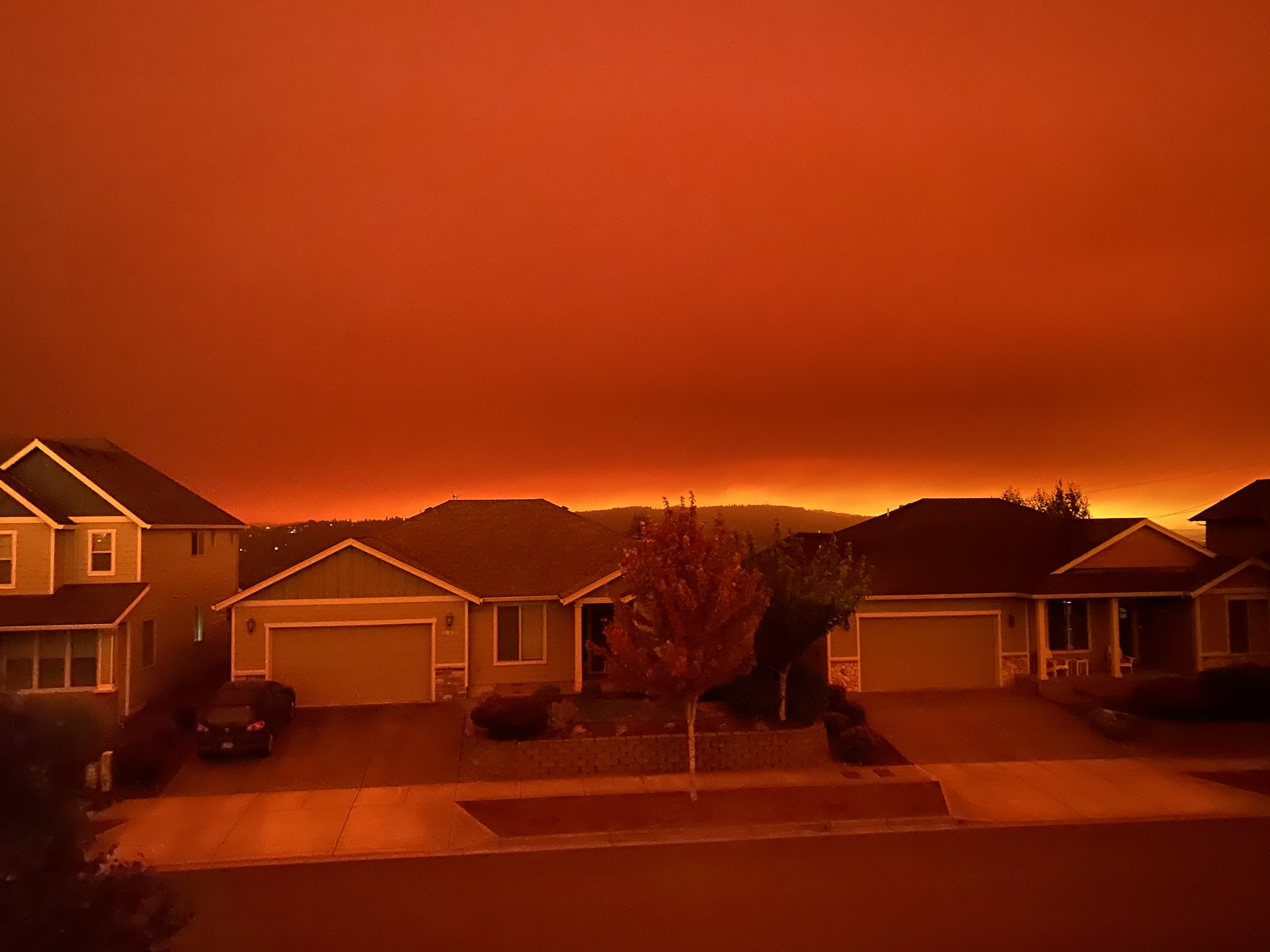
Air pollution, Salem, 2020

Another version of the bill was presented in 2020, this time with more significant business exemptions. Again, House and Senate Republicans fled the capital to prevent the minimum number of representatives from being present to vote on the bill.

=== Public response ===
In April 2016, a lawsuit began in Oregon was admitted by a federal magistrate judge in the name of 21 teenagers and children pushing for more aggressive climate policies.

== See also ==
- Plug-in electric vehicles in Oregon
