= Ralph Samuels =

American politician

Majority Leader of the Alaska House of Representatives
- In office 2006–2008
- Preceded by: John Coghill
- Succeeded by: Kyle Johansen

Member of the Alaska House of Representatives from the 29th district
- In office 2002–2008
- Preceded by: John Davies
- Succeeded by: Chris Tuck

Personal details
- Born: December 1, 1961 (age 64) Anchorage, Alaska, U.S.
- Party: Republican
- Occupation: Airline manager, cruise industry vice president, former chair of the Anchorage Chamber of Commerce, and former board member of the State Chamber of Commerce.

Ralph Samuels (born December 1, 1961) is a businessman and a member of the Republican Party and candidate for Governor of Alaska, that served as a state representative of the Alaska State Legislature from 2002 to 2008 representing House District 29 and serving as the majority leader.

== Educational background ==
Attended schools in Anchorage, King Salmon, and Fairbanks and graduated from Metlaktla High School in 1979. He attended the University of Alaska, in Fairbanks from 1980 to 1985.

== Positions as a gubernatorial candidate ==
- Economy- One of the main planks for Samuels' candidacies, he claims, is to encourage economic development. In a recent article he was quoted saying, "As governor I'll work to encourage economic development. We'll look at the current tax structures to determine whether or not there's an opportunity to stem the recent rapid decline in oil production and oil exploration in Alaska,"
- Energy- In March 2007, when the Governor of Alaska, Sarah Palin presented the Alaska Gasline Inducement Act (AGIA) to build a natural gas pipeline from the state's North Slope (with $500 million seed money from the state), Samuels was the only legislator who voted against the measure.
- Taxes- He also was in a coalition that opposed the, then Governor Palin introduced, tax raise known as "ACES" (Alaskans Clear and Equitable Share)which made Alaska as the highest marginal tax rate in the world."
- Family- In January, Samuels wrote a position statement in support of the initiative circulating the state attempting to re-instate parental/legal guardian notification of a minor to receive an abortion. In his article he claimed "...in our society that a parent must consent before a child gets her ears pierced or even receives an aspirin at school. The notion that a non-emergency medical procedure can be performed on a teenager, without a parent even knowing about it, strikes most people as absurd. Yet this is exactly what happens in Alaska."

See also Alaska Gas Pipeline.

== Leadership positions in politics ==
- Served as majority leader of the Alaska House of Representatives (2006–2008)

== Business and professional positions ==
- Airline executive for Penair (1980 to 2008)
- Vice president for government and community affairs for tourism giant, Holland America Line (2008–present)
- Member of the Alaska Air Carriers Association
- Former chair of the Anchorage Chamber of Commerce
- Former board member of the State Chamber of Commerce
