= James W. Holley III =

American politician

Dr. James W. Holley III
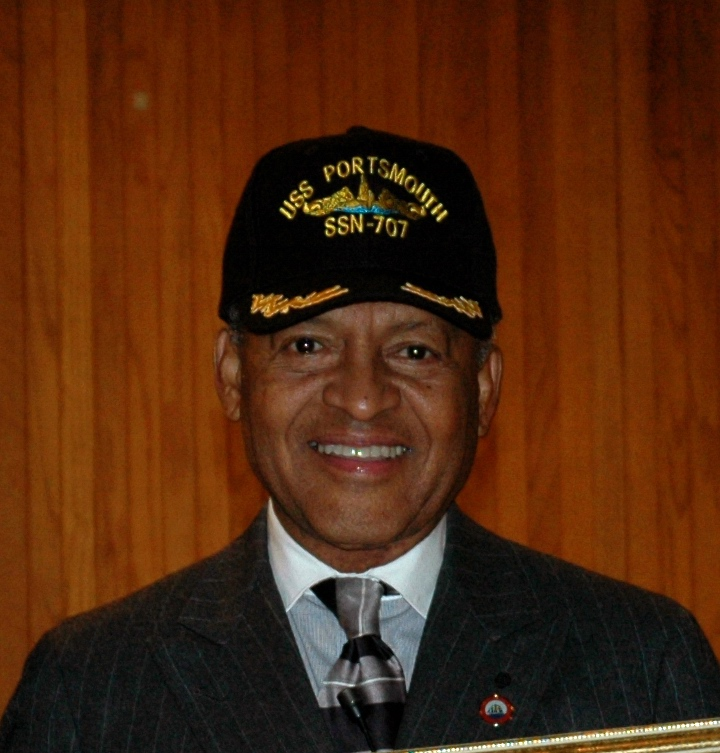

Mayor of Portsmouth, Virginia
- In office July 1984 – December 1987
- Preceded by: Julian E. Johansen
- In office July 1996 – July 2010
- Succeeded by: Kenneth I. Wright

Personal details
- Born: November 24, 1926 Portsmouth, Virginia, United States
- Died: October 5, 2012 (aged 85) Portsmouth, Virginia, United States
- Party: Independent
- Spouse: Mary Holley
- Education: West Virginia State College

James W. Holley III (November 24, 1926 – October 5, 2012) was an American politician and dental surgeon. Holley became the first Black mayor of Portsmouth, Virginia, and ultimately the city's longest serving mayor, although both his mayoral terms (separated by a decade) ended with his being recalled from office. Thus he became the only known politician in American history to be twice recalled until Fullerton, California Councilman Don Bankhead was recalled in June 2012.

== Early life ==
Holley was born in 1926. After graduating from Portsmouth's I. C. Norcom High School in 1944, Holley served in the United States Army during World War II, stationed in Camp Livingston in Louisiana. Following the war, he attended West Virginia State College (now West Virginia State University), and graduated with a Bachelor of Science in 1949. From there he went to Washington, D.C. where he attended dental school at the Howard University College of Dentistry, graduating in 1955. He has also received an honorary law degree from West Virginia State. He attended college on the G.I. Bill. During a reception in the late 1950s, Holley met Virginia Union University student Mary Walker; the couple would marry in 1960.

Holley was active during the Civil Rights Movement in the 1950s and 1960s, and played an integral role in the desegregation of Portsmouth, winning court battles which allowed for the equal use of the city's libraries, hospitals, restaurants and golf courses. In 1961, he and fellow dentist Dr. Hugo Owens, then the president of the local NAACP, requested service at the public library but were turned down because of their race, which ultimately led to the combination of that library with the segregated black library. During the course of his involvement in the civil rights movement, Holley entertained Martin Luther King Jr. at his home on multiple occasions.

== Politics ==
Holley first served as a member of the Portsmouth City Council from 1968 to 1984, and was vice-mayor from 1978 to 1980. Upon his election in 1968, he became the first African American to serve on Portsmouth's City Council. He has twice held the office of mayor, first from July 1, 1984, to December 15, 1987, and again from July 1996 to July 13, 2010. Holley was also the first African American mayor in the city's history, and its longest serving mayor.

His first term came to an end following an expense account scandal, becoming the first Virginia politician in modern times to be recalled. Hate mail sent to community leaders became another factor in his removal. His successor, Gloria O. Webb, former chairperson of the School Board, not only became Portsmouth's first female mayor, but also served uncontested for a decade. In May 2008 Holley narrowly defeated Martha Ann Creecy in the first contested mayoral election in Portsmouth since his 1996 victory. Holley was recalled for a second time on July 13, 2010. This second recall effort began in 2009 after an assistant made a confidential complaint of verbal abuse and of being required by Holley to perform his personal errands while working on city time. The accusations (leaked to the press) prompted the Portsmouth City Council to fine Holley $2,500 and ask him to retire, citing a pattern of mistreating subordinates. After Holley refused to retire, his opponents circulated a recall petition citing the allegations against him, which gathered 8000 signatures, which a judge deemed sufficient to place Holley's recall on the ballot for July 13, 2010. Though an Independent, Holley backed both Democrats and Republicans running for office, including Hillary Clinton's 2008 presidential bid and former Senator George Allen's 2006 re-election bid. He also made a campaign contribution to Barack Obama.

Holley also drew criticism in 2008 for suggesting that Portsmouth needed a "black" hotel to act as a counterbalance to the "white" Renaissance Hotel. Holley was an early supporter of the Renaissance; his portrait hangs in the lobby, and the hotel named its ballroom the "Holley Ballroom." He later apologized for the remark, saying that his words were "misconstrued" and "misinterpreted."

Holley died in 2012, aged 85, after suffering a stroke.

== Fashion ==
Holley was known for his stylish dress. He appeared in the September 2007 issue of Esquire along with former Virginia Beach mayor Meyera E. Oberndorf in a feature chronicling U.S. mayors.

== See also ==
- List of first African-American mayors
