= Maxine Dibert =

American educator and politician

Member of the Alaska House of Representatives from the 31st district
- Incumbent
- Assumed office January 17, 2023
- Preceded by: Bart LeBon

Personal details
- Born: Fairbanks, Alaska, U.S.
- Party: Democratic
- Education: University of Alaska Fairbanks (BS); Lesley University (MS)

Maxine Dibert is an American educator and politician serving as a member of the Alaska House of Representatives for the 31st district. Elected in November 2022, she assumed office on January 17, 2023.

== Early life and education ==
Dibert was born and raised in Fairbanks, Alaska and is Koyukon Athabascan. She earned a bachelor's degree in elementary education from the University of Alaska Fairbanks and a master's degree in curriculum development from Lesley University.

== Career ==
Dibert taught at Denali Elementary School in Fairbanks for 21 years. She is also a science curriculum designer. Dibert was elected to the Alaska House of Representatives in November 2022.

== Electoral history ==
=== 2024 ===
==== Primary ====
2024 Nonpartisan primary
Party	Candidate	Votes	%
Democratic	Maxine Dibert (incumbent)	1,109	51.5
Republican	Bart LeBon	1,045	48.5
Total votes		2,154	100.0

==== General ====
2024 Alaska House of Representatives election, District 31
Party	Candidate	Votes	%
Democratic	Maxine Dibert (incumbent)	3,518	54.2
Republican	Bart LeBon	2,948	45.5
Write-in		20	0.3
Total votes		6,486	100.0
Democratic hold			

== See also ==
- List of Native American politicians
- Native American women in politics
