= Cliff Davidson =

American politician

Member of the Alaska House of Representatives from the 6th district
- In office January 11, 1993 – January 17, 1995
- Preceded by: Eugene G. Kubina
- Succeeded by: Alan Austerman

Member of the Alaska House of Representatives from the 27th district
- In office January 20, 1987 – January 11, 1993
- Preceded by: Dave Thompson
- Succeeded by: Ronald L. Larson

Personal details
- Born: January 7, 1941 (age 85) Logansport, Indiana
- Party: Democratic

Cliff Davidson (born January 7, 1941) is an American politician who served in the Alaska House of Representatives from 1987 to 1995.
