= Alaska's 1st House of Representatives district =

Alaskan legislative district

Alaska's 1st State House of Representatives district
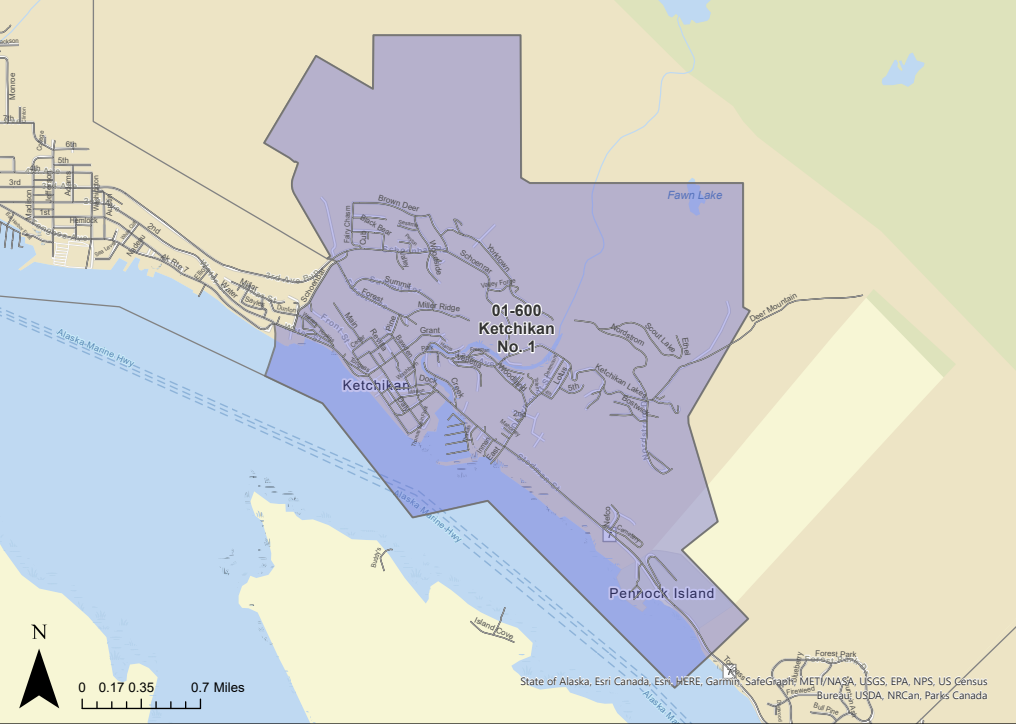
- 2023 boundaries
Representative
Bart LeBon; R–Fairbanks
since January 15, 2019
- Population (2020): 17,182

Alaska's 1st House of Representatives district is the first of 40 districts of the Alaska House of Representatives and was created in statehood in 1959. It is currently represented by Republican Bart LeBon. Following redistricting in 2013, the district is currently composed of downtown Fairbanks and has a population of 17,182.

The state legislature underwent redistricting following the 2020 census, which placed the first district in Southeast Alaska, covering the cities of Ketchikan, Wrangell, and Metlakatla. The new district will come into effect upon the start of the 33rd legislature in 2023.

== Results from statewide races ==
Year	Office	Results
2014	Senate	Begich 49.5% – 44.2%
2014	House	Young 50.2% – 39.7%
2014	Governor	Walker 50.9% – 42.4%
2016	President	Trump 47.9% – 38.8%
2016	Senate	Murkowski 46.0% – 28.5%
2016	House	Young 47.1% – 37.9%
2018	House	Galvin 52.4% – 47.1%
2018	Governor	Begich 49.3% – 45.8%
2020	President	Trump 47.7% – 47.2%
2020	Senate	Sullivan 48.4% – 45.7%
2020	House	Galvin 51.3% – 48.4%

== List of members ==
=== Non-Lettered districts (1959-1983) ===
Representatives	Party	Years	Residence	Source
Charles M. Jones		Democratic	January 26, 1959 – January 22, 1961	Craig
Alfred E. Widmark		Republican	January 23, 1961 - April 12, 1962	Klawock

=== Multi-member districts (1983–1993) ===
Seat A

Representative	Party	Years of service	Residency	Notes	Ref
Ron Wendte	Democratic	1983 – January 14, 1985	Ketchikan		
Robin L. Taylor	Republican	January 14, 1985 – June 10, 1992	Wrangell	Resigned to join the Alaska Senate	
Carroll Fader	Republican	June 10, 1992 – January 11, 1993		Appointed	

Seat B

Representative	Party	Years of service	Residency	Notes	Ref
Jack McBride	Democratic	1983 – April 16, 1984	Ketchikan	Died in office	
John Sund	Democratic	April 16, 1984 – January 9, 1989	Ketchikan	Appointed	
Cheri Davis	Republican	January 9, 1989 – January 11, 1993	Ketchikan		

=== Single-member districts (1993–present) ===
Representative	Party	Years of service	Residency	Notes	Ref
Bill K. Williams	Democratic	January 11, 1993 – January 18, 2005	Saxman	Switched party to Republican in 1999	
Jim Elkins	Republican	January 18, 2005 – January 16, 2007	Ketchikan		
Kyle Johansen	Republican	January 16, 2007 – January 14, 2013	Ketchikan		
Doug Isaacson	Republican	January 14, 2013 – January 20, 2015	North Pole	Redistricted to the 3rd district	
Scott Kawasaki	Democratic	January 20, 2015 – January 15, 2019	Fairbanks	Redistricted from the 9th district	
Bart LeBon	Republican	January 15, 2019 – present	Fairbanks	Redistricted to the 31st district	

== Recent election results ==
=== 2014 ===
2014 Alaska's 1st House of Representatives district election
Party	Candidate	Votes	%
Democratic	Scott Kawasaki (incumbent)	2,973	54.76
Republican	Gregory Don Bringhurst	2,434	44.83
Write-in		22	0.41
Total votes		5,429	100.00
Democratic hold			

=== 2016 ===
2016 Alaska's 1st House of Representatives district election
Party	Candidate	Votes	%
Democratic	Scott Kawasaki (incumbent)	4,376	90.19
Write-in		476	9.81
Total votes		4,852	100.00
Democratic hold			

=== 2018 ===
2018 Alaska's 1st House of Representatives district election
Party	Candidate	Votes	%
Republican	Bart LeBon	2,663	49.85
Democratic	Kathryn Dodge	2,662	49.83
Write-in		17	0.32
Total votes		5,342	100.00
Republican gain from Democratic			

After originally being tied, a recount was ordered, which put LeBon ahead by only one vote. Dodge appealed the result to the Alaska Supreme Court. However, the court denied Dodge's appeal, officially making LeBon the winner.

=== 2020 ===
2020 Alaska's 1st House of Representatives district election
Party	Candidate	Votes	%
Republican	Bart LeBon (incumbent)	3,769	55.30
Democratic	Kathryn Dodge	3,027	44.42
Write-in		19	0.28
Total votes		6,815	100.00
Republican hold			
