= Doug Isaacson =

American politician

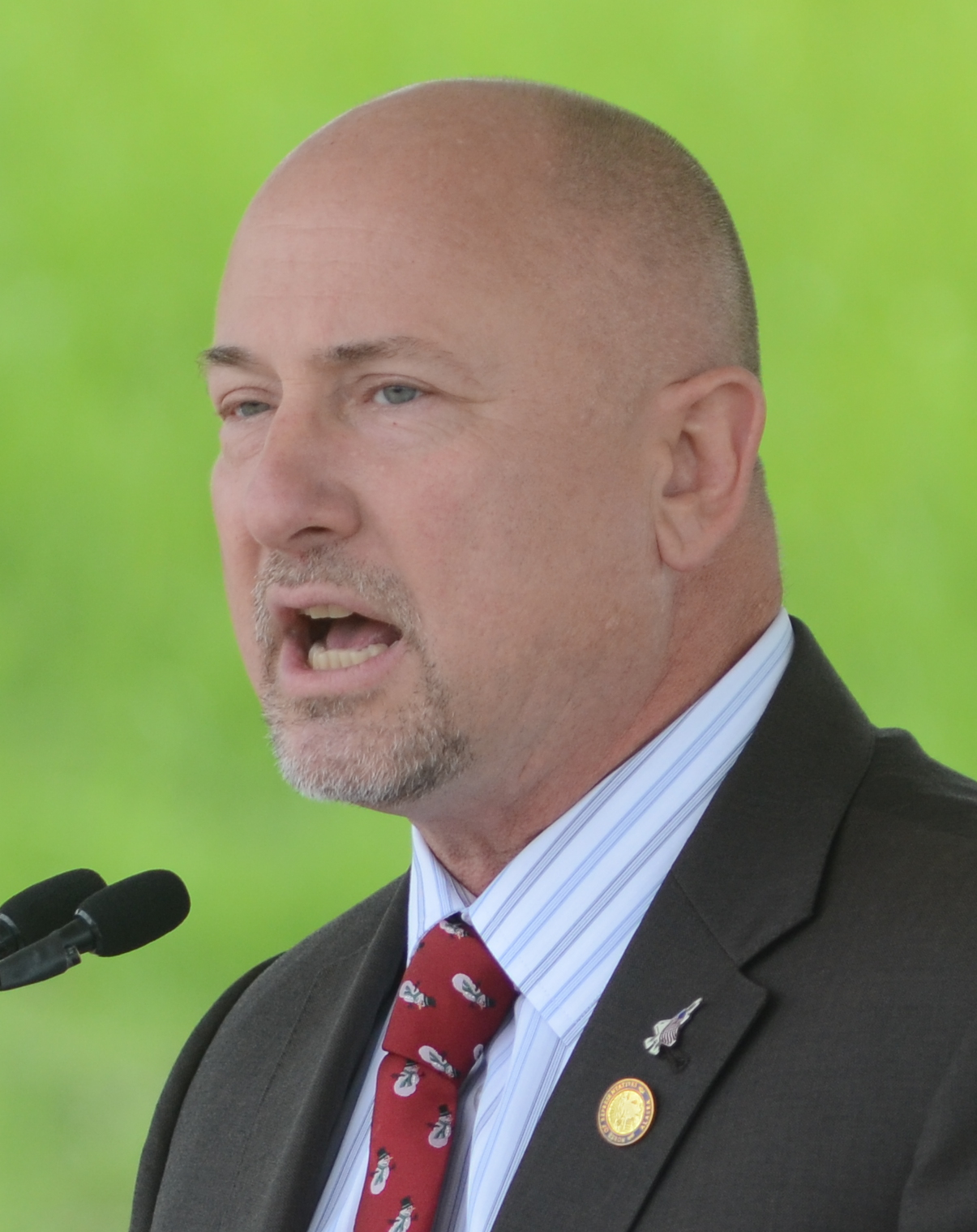
- Isaacson in 2014

Member of the Alaska House of Representatives from the 1st district
- In office January 18, 2013 – January 15, 2015
- Preceded by: Kyle Johansen
- Succeeded by: Scott Kawasaki

Mayor of North Pole, Alaska
- In office 2006–2012
- Preceded by: Jeff Jacobson
- Succeeded by: Bryce Ward

Personal details
- Born: Douglas W. Isaacson; October 18, 1957 (age 68) Seattle, Washington, U.S.
- Party: Republican
- Education: University of Washington; Western Seminary
- Website: dougisaacson.org

Military service
- Branch/service: United States Air Force

Douglas W. Isaacson (born October 18, 1957) is an American Republican politician and a former member of the Alaska House of Representatives from District 1. He represented the 1st district from January 18, 2013 – January 15, 2015.

== Early life and education ==
Douglas W. Isaacson was born on October 18, 1957, in Seattle. He grew up in Snohomish County, north of Seattle, in Edmonds. He enlisted in the United States Air Force shortly after graduating from high school and was a Russian translator in the military. He came to Alaska as a result of being stationed at Eielson Air Force Base and decided to remain in Alaska after leaving military service, settling in nearby North Pole.

Isaacson earned his BA in linguistics from the University of Washington in Seattle; he received his master's degree in divinity from Western Seminary in Portland, Oregon.

== Political career ==
=== Mayor of North Pole ===
Isaacson was elected to the North Pole city council in 2000 serving until being elected North Pole's mayor in 2006. He faced a somewhat tumultuous tenure in office, which was also the case with a number of his predecessors. In 2009, he was reelected by only two votes over his predecessor, Jeff Jacobson. He survived a recall election in 2010. Isaacson was term-limited in 2012 and decided instead to run for the Alaska House of Representatives.

=== Alaska House of Representatives ===
- House District 1 was created by the Alaska Redistricting Board's Amended Proclamation Plan in 2012. Isaacson won the District 1 four-way August 28, 2012 Republican Primary with 770 votes (34.09%), and won the November 6, 2012 General election with 5,428 votes (77.43%) against Democratic nominee Janice Golub.

In the 28th Legislature, Isaacson co-chaired the House Special Committee on Energy, was vice-chair of House Transportation, and served on the following committees: State Affairs, Joint Armed Services, and sub-finance committees for Corrections; Transportation; and Department of Military and Veterans Affairs. Additionally, Isaacson was named to serve on the Council of State Governments as a member of the Energy and Environment Task Force; with the Council of State Governments West - (CSG West) and served on two committees: Canada Relations and Energy and Public Lands Committee; as an alternate member of the Pacific NorthWest Economic Region (PNWER); and as an alternate member of the Energy Council's Energy Committee.

Isaacson fought for reducing the price of consumer energy, and was vocal in pressing for a "cost or supply benefit" for in-state refining of Alaska's royalty oil share for in-state use as required by Alaska law, notably AS 38.05.183. A noteworthy accomplishment was in moving the State of Alaska to address the high cost of electricity throughout Alaska. Isaacson held three effective roundtables, two of which for the first time in legislative memory placed together the utility companies, the independent power producers, the Regulatory Commission of Alaska, the Alaska Energy Authority, the American Transmission Company (Wisconsin), and legislators to discuss "Designing Alaska's Future: Removing Energy Gridlock." The goal of the roundtables was to move toward lowering rate payer costs by examining restructuring the management of electrical transmission, clarify regulatory needs, and open access issues. The first informal discussion was held in the Capital Building in Juneau, Alaska on January 31, 2014, and only included the Chairman of the Regulatory Commission of Alaska. The second roundtable discussion was also held in the Capital on April 9, 2014; the third roundtable discussion was held at the Anchorage Legislative Information Office on September 5, 2014.

- On July 14, 2013, owing to a lawsuit that had contested the 2012 Proclamation Plan, the Alaska Redistricting Board adopted its 2013 Proclamation Plan, which ultimately was passed by the Alaska Supreme Court, and which pitted against each other the two North Pole incumbents Tammie Wilson against the freshman Isaacson. In the newly created House District 3, Isaacson ultimately lost the August 19, 2014 primary race with 1415 votes (45.08%) to T. Wilson 1724 votes (54.92%).
