= Plug-in electric vehicles in Oregon =

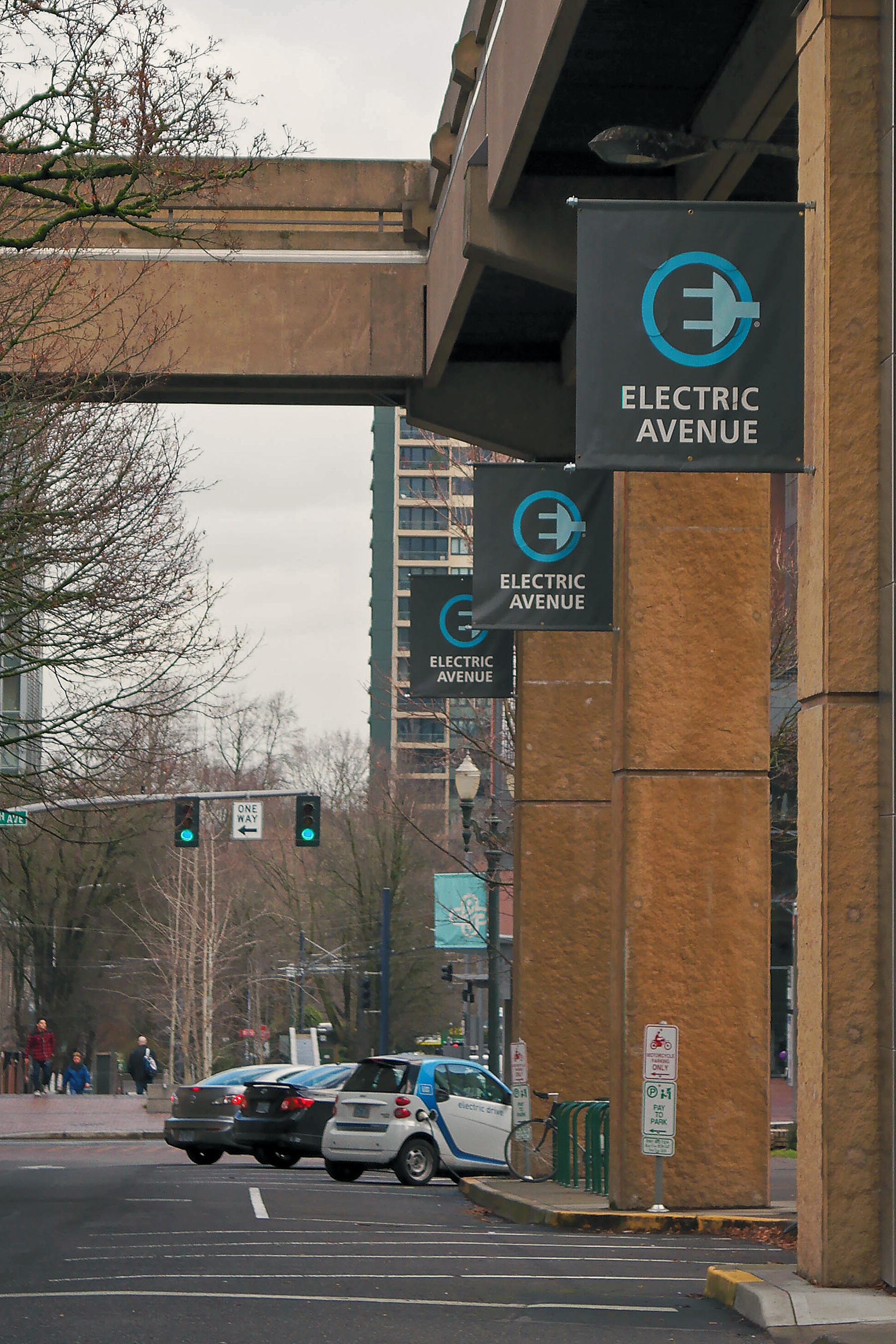
Electric Avenue charging stations at Portland State University

As of January 2022, there were about 42,000 electric vehicles in Oregon, United States.

== Government policy ==
The state initially had a $1,500 tax rebate for electric vehicle purchases, which was repealed in 2013.

In January 2022, the state government announced a $7,500 tax rebate for electric vehicle purchases. The rebate applies to households with an annual income between $51,000 and $251,000.

In 2021, the state government enacted a law requiring that 20% of parking spaces for new commercial and residential buildings be equipped for electric vehicle charging.

== Charging stations ==
The Infrastructure Investment and Jobs Act, signed into law in November 2021, allocates US$7.7 million for electric vehicle charging stations in Oregon.

As of May 2022, the state government recognizes seven "Alternative Fuel Corridors" along major highways, with charging stations located at least once every 50 miles (80 km); these highways are I-5, I-82, I-84, US-20, US-26, US-97, and US-101.

== By region ==
=== Medford ===
As of 2018, Jackson County had about 900 electric vehicles, a majority of which were registered in Ashland.

=== Portland ===
In 2016, Portland was ranked the most electric-car-friendly city in the United States by Indiana University. The Oregon Electric Vehicle Association (oeva.org) is headquartered in Portland.
