= Kyle Johansen =

American politician

Majority Leader of the Alaska House of Representatives
- In office January 19, 2009 – November 11, 2010
- Preceded by: Ralph Samuels
- Succeeded by: Alan Austerman

Member of the Alaska House of Representatives from the 1st district
- In office January 16, 2007 – January 14, 2013
- Preceded by: Jim Elkins
- Succeeded by: Doug Isaacson

Personal details
- Born: July 13, 1967 (age 59) Ketchikan, Alaska, U.S.
- Party: Republican
- Education: Washington State University
- Occupation: Consultant

Kyle Johansen (born July 13, 1967) was the Republican Majority Leader, in the Alaska House of Representatives. He represented Alaska's 1st District from January 16, 2007 – January 14, 2013. Before he was elected to the Alaska House, he served as a legislative aid to Representative Bill Williams.

== Personal life ==
Johansen has three children: Jacie, Makena, and Shelbi. He went to Ketchikan High School and graduated in 1985, before going on to Washington State University. He holds a Bachelor of Arts in Elementary Education from Washington State University.
