= Alvaro Preciado =

American politician

Mayor of Avenal, California
- Disputed
- Assumed office 2024

Alvaro Preciado is an American former elected official who served as mayor of Avenal, California from 2024 to 2026. In 2026, Preciado, along with all but one member of the Avenal City Council, were recalled in an election, but all the recalled officials have continued to serve in their official capacities.

== Career ==
An election to recall Mayor Preciado and City Councilmembers Leticia Gamez, David Reynosa, and Pablo Hernandez was held April 28, 2026. All four officials were recalled.
