= Oregon House Bill 2020 =

Oregon State Legislature
- Introduced: February 4, 2019
- Website: Bill Information

Status: Not passed

House Bill 2020 was a proposed bill in the U.S. state of Oregon that would introduce a statewide cap and trade system to reduce carbon emissions to address climate change. It was introduced in the Legislative Assembly in January 2019 and underwent major changes before being passed by the House of Representatives on June 18, 2019. Prior to its reading in the State Senate, eleven Republican senators announced their intention to protest and walkout, preventing a quorum from being reached; in response, Governor Kate Brown dispatched the Oregon State Police to search for the senators.

== Proposal ==
The cap and trade program was proposed by environmentalist lobbying coalition Renew Oregon and other environmental organizations, using the existing program in California as an example. If passed, the program would come into effect in 2021 with the goal of reducing emissions to 45 percent below 1990 levels by 2035 and 80 percent below by the year 2050. The initial cap will be set at 25,000 metric tons of annual carbon emissions and is projected to raise $550 million in its first year. The program would reinvest revenues into environmentally friendly projects, including energy efficiency projects for utilities, a fund to transition jobs that would be affected by climate change, and low-carbon transportation projects, including support for mass transit and cycling.

== History and political debate ==
House Bill 2020 was introduced on February 4, 2019, returning a previous cap and trade amendment that was deferred from the Clean Energy Jobs Bill in 2018. The Democrats had won a supermajority in both chambers of the Oregon state legislature in the 2018 elections, presenting a new opportunity to consider the plan alongside other environmental actions. The initial proposal was revised and rewritten several times, including a major amendment in late March, before passing the House on June 18.

=== Senate walkout ===
On June 20, 2019, eleven Republican senators announced their intention to leave the state in protest of House Bill 2020, preventing a quorum to vote on the senate floor. The following day, Governor Kate Brown dispatched state troopers to search for the absent senators and return them to the state capitol for the vote.

The Oregon State Capitol was shut down on June 21 following an unsubstantiated threat from a right-wing militia group that was received by state police. On June 26, Reddit quarantined the subreddit /r/The_Donald, due to posts which advocated violence related to this walkout.
