= 207th Regiment =

207th Regiment may refer to:

- 207th Aviation Regiment, United States
- 207th Coast Artillery Regiment, United States
- 207th Pennsylvania Infantry Regiment, Union Army regiment during the American Civil War

== See also ==
- 207th Division (disambiguation)
- 207th (disambiguation)
