= 207 (disambiguation) =

207 may refer to:

- 207 (year)
- 207 (number)
- 207 BC
- Peugeot 207
- 207 Hedda
- Area code 207
- 207 series
- NGC 207
- UFC 207

== See also ==
- 207th (disambiguation)
