= C207 =

C207 or variant, may refer to:

== Vehicles ==
- Cessna 207 (C 207), general aviation light airplane
- Mercedes-Benz E-Class (C207), a car
- SpaceX Crew Dragon Resilience (C207), a SpaceX Dragon 2 crew transport space capsule
- C207, a vehicle used by Pennsylvania mass transit provider CamTran
- C2 07 steam locomotive of the Jiayang Coal Railway

== Other uses ==
- Casterton–Edenhope Road (C207), Victoria, Australia; see List of road routes in Victoria

== See also ==
- 207 (disambiguation)
- C (disambiguation)
