= 207th Brigade =

207th Brigade may refer to:

- 207th (2nd East Midland) Brigade, United Kingdom
- 207th Independent Infantry Brigade, United Kingdom
- 207th Military Intelligence Brigade, United States

== See also ==
- 207th Division (disambiguation)
- 207th Regiment (disambiguation)
