= David Nelson (Alaska politician) =

American politician from Alaska

Member of the Alaska House of Representatives
- Incumbent
- Assumed office January 21, 2025
- Preceded by: Cliff Groh
- Constituency: 18th
- In office January 19, 2021 – January 17, 2023
- Preceded by: Gabrielle LeDoux
- Succeeded by: Tom McKay (redistricting)
- Constituency: 15th

Personal details
- Born: August 13, 1996 (age 29) Orlando, Florida, U.S.
- Party: Republican
- Education: University of Alaska Anchorage (BA)

Military service
- Branch/service: United States Army
- Unit: Alaska Army National Guard: 207th Aviation Regiment

David Nelson (born August 13, 1996) is an American politician who is a member of the Alaska House of Representatives from the 18th district. A Republican, he previously represented the 15th district from 2021 to 2023. He was defeated by Democrat Cliff Groh in 2022, but defeated Groh for the seat in 2024.

== Early life and education ==
Nelson was born in Orlando, Florida to Tom Nelson, a pastor, and his wife Nancy, both natives of Nappanee, Indiana. He was raised in Sanford, Florida. He earned a Bachelor of Arts degree in political science from University of Alaska Anchorage in 2018. During college, he was a member of the Junior Reserve Officers' Training Corps.

== Career ==
After graduating from college, Nelson was commissioned as a second lieutenant in the Alaska Army National Guard. He serves as a CBRN officer for in 207th Aviation Regiment at Joint Base Elmendorf–Richardson. Nelson has also worked as a defense contractor and as the president of the Mid-Town Rotary Club of Anchorage. He was elected to the Alaska House of Representatives in November 2020 and assumed office on January 19, 2021.

In 2022, redistricting of Alaska's state house districts placed Nelson in the newly created House District 18, where he ran for re-election. He was challenged by two Democrats, Lyn Franks and Cliff Groh. None of the three candidates received more than 50 percent of the vote on Election Day, so due to Alaska's ranked choice voting system, the race went to an instant runoff between Nelson and Groh. Nelson was ultimately unseated by Groh.

== Electoral history ==
=== 2024 ===
==== Primary ====
Nonpartisan primary
Party	Candidate	Votes	%
Democratic	Cliff Groh (incumbent)	379	64.2
Republican	David Nelson	211	35.8
Total votes		590	100.0

==== General ====
2024 Alaska House of Representatives election, District 18
Party	Candidate	Votes	%
Republican	David Nelson	1,878	50.2
Democratic	Cliff Groh (incumbent)	1,856	49.7
Write-in		3	0.1
Total votes		3,737	100.0
Republican gain from Democratic			
