= Stellantis Trnava Plant =

Slovakian car manufacturing and assembly plant

Coordinates: 48°21′41″N 17°37′43″E

- Industry: automotive industry
- Founded: 23 September 2003
- Founder: PSA Group
- Headquarters: Trnava
- Revenue: 4,431,400,000 euro (2025)
- Operating income: 53,294,000 euro (2020)
- Net income: 24,100,000 euro (2025)
- Total assets: 1,035,448,000 euro (2023)
- Number of employees: 3,300 (2024)
- Parent: Stellantis
- Website: www.stellantis-slovakia.sk

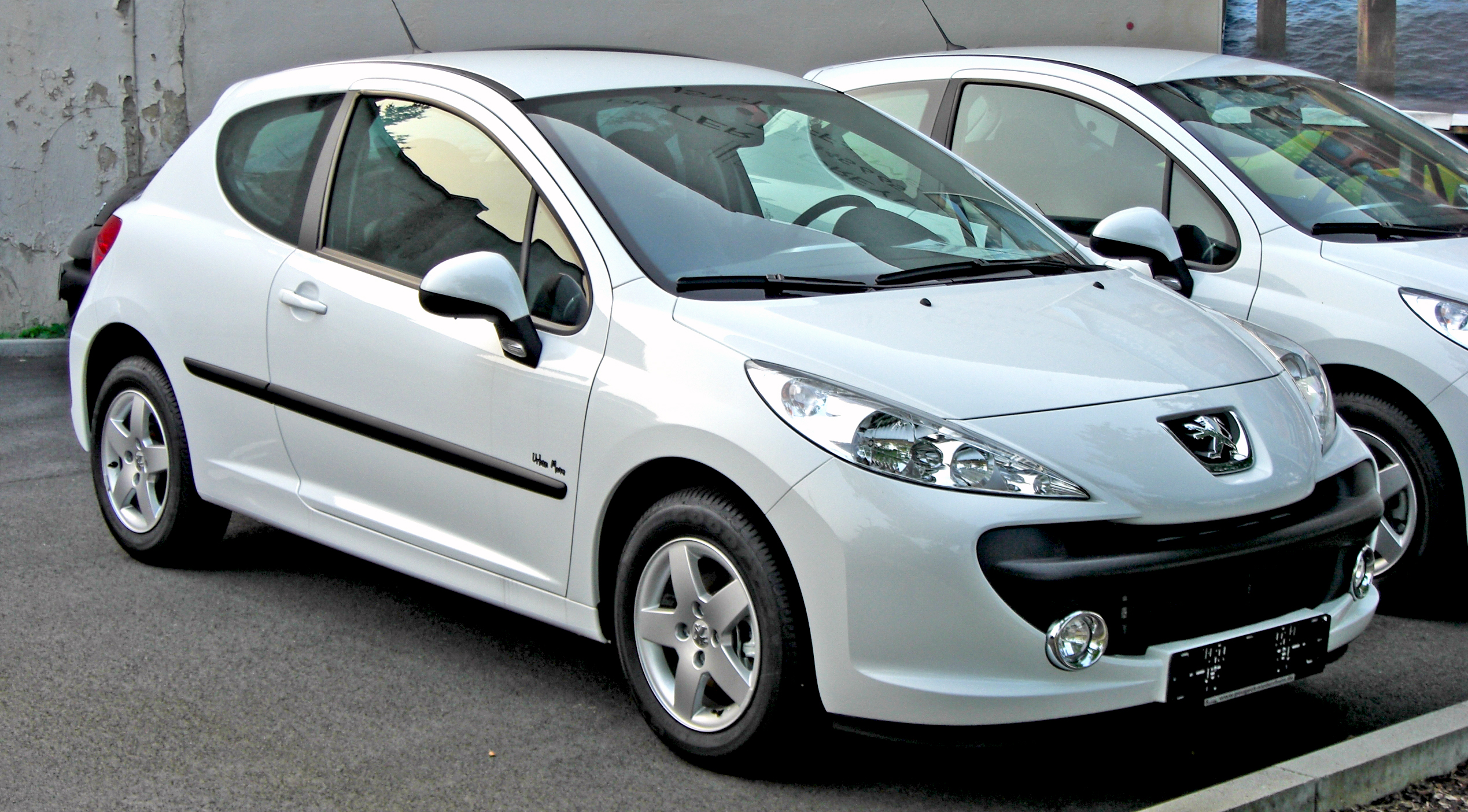
The Peugeot 207 was the first model produced by Peugeot-Citroën at Trnava

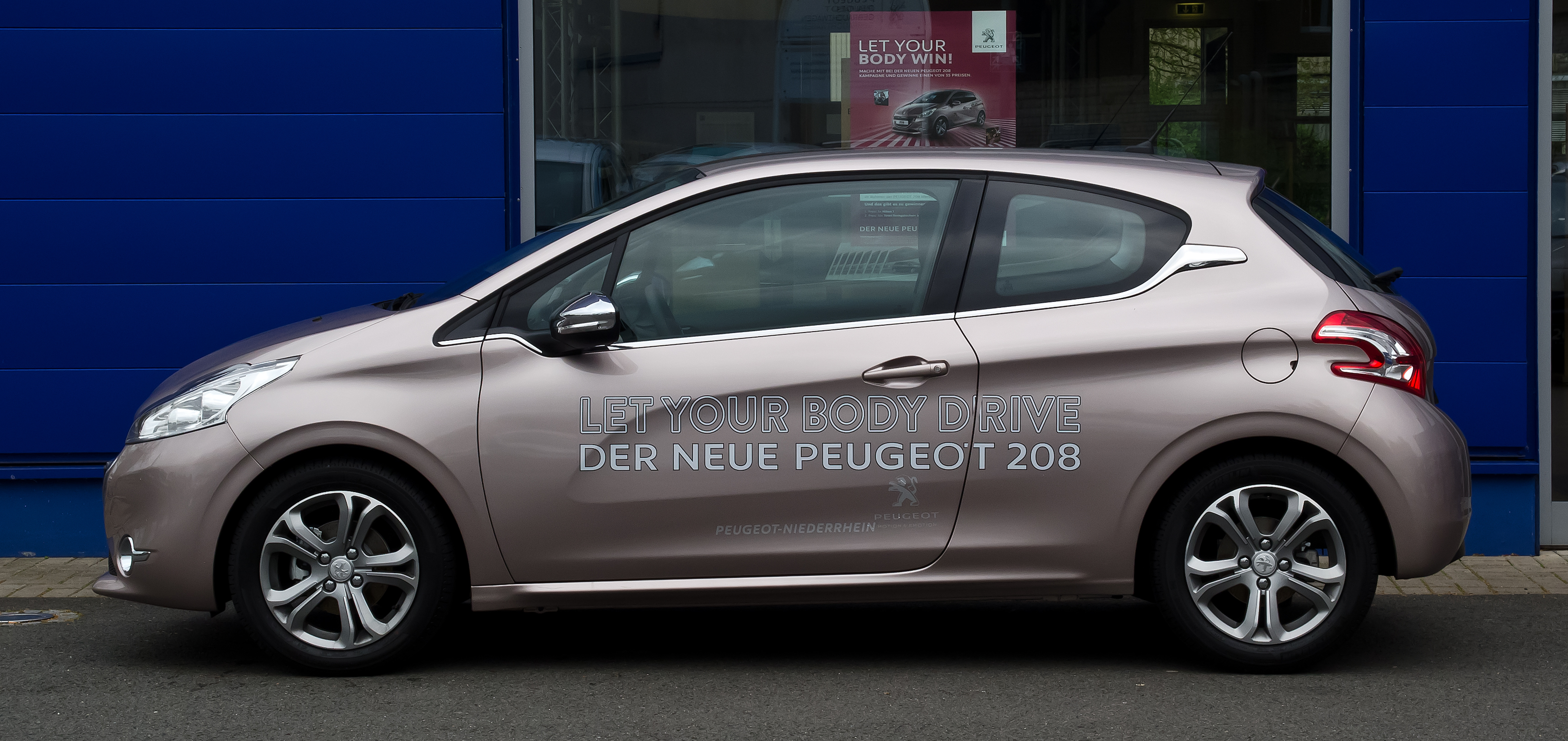
The Peugeot 208 has been produced at Trnava since November 2011.

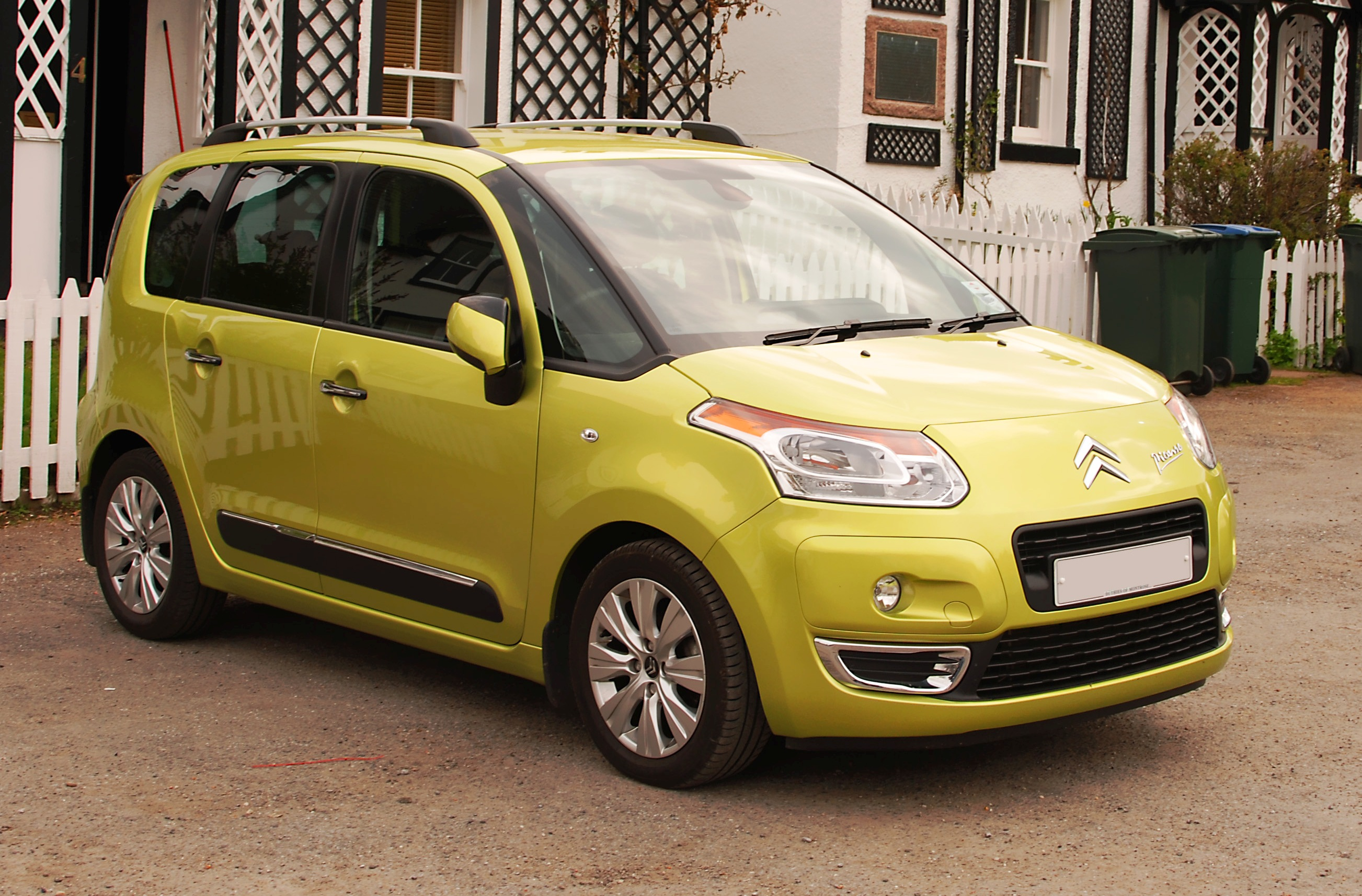
Trnava was the only plant in Europe to manufacture the Citroën C3 Picasso

The Stellantis Trnava Plant is a major car plant in Slovakia and the most recently established Stellantis plant in Europe. It is located directly to the south-east of Trnava, approximately 60 kilometres (37 mi) from Bratislava and the frontier with Austria to the south-west.

== History ==
The 193 hectare site was chosen in January 2003 and the first stone was laid five months later, on 17 June.

Volume auto-production commenced at the end of May 2006, although the plant's official opening took place only on 19 October 2006 in a ceremony headed by PSA President Jean-Martin Folz and Slovak prime minister Robert Fico even though it was his predecessor and political rival, the former prime minister Mikuláš Dzurinda who had originally agreed with Peugeot the terms for the plant's construction in Slovakia. Of the €700 million invested, €105 million came in the form of government aid.

On 8 December 2005 the manufacturer announced an additional investment of €357 million to increase the plant's annual capacity by 150,000 units in order to produce the forthcoming mini-mpv model known at that stage simply by the internal project designation "A58". However, on 7 September 2006 it was announced that the expansion project had been "put on hold", since the group had no overall need for additional auto-production capacity in Europe. Nevertheless, within the originally specified capacity, plans for Trnava to produce the "A58" remained in place. The car went into volume production in the middle of 2008 and was officially presented to the press in July and to the public in September at the Paris Motor Show as the Citroën C3 Picasso, PSA's answer to the Renault Grand Modus and Opel/Vauxhall Meriva. French C3 Picasso sales started in February 2009 and extended to other European markets during the next few months. The Trnava factory was and in 2012 remains the only plant producing this model.

Between the launch of the Citroën C3 Picasso and 2012 the plant produced the C3 alongside the old Peugeot 207 with production reaching 248,405 in 2013, still some way short of the planned maximum capacity of 300,000 units annually. The manufacturer blamed lack of consumer demand for small cars in key western European markets, and ominously, production was suspended for six days in May 2009 and six more days in June 2009. However, PSA insisted that they would honour existing undertakings not to suspend any of the plant's 3,000 employees during 2010/11.

In November 2011, a few months more than five years after the first cars were produced at the Trnava plant, it was time to celebrate production of the plant's 1,000,000th car. It was also in November 2011 that a third model was added to the plant's line-up, being the two door version of the Peugeot 208. Production of this model is now shared with two major plants in France, at Poissy and Mulhouse, but it did not go unremarked that the plant in Slovakia started production of this important new model some months before the French plants. The investment to production of Peugeot 208 was more than 120 million € in the year 2011.

According to the company data Stellantis Trnava after overcoming crises in 2009 was steadily increasing production: 2013 by 15.5%, 2014 by 2.7%, 2015 by 19% as follows:

Year	No. of cars
2006	52,000
2007	177,000
2008	185,000
2009	205,000
2010	186,140
2011	177,776
2012	214,617
2013	248,405
2014	255,176
2015	303,025

In the 2013 the production of Peugeot 207 was stopped and the majority (2013:184,754; 2014:206,562) of cars produced were Peugeot 208.

In March 2015 Slovak media revealed that the Trnava plant will produce a new Citroën model with code name B618, a small SUV in the B segment similar to the C3-XR model. The French headquarters confirmed this news in April 2015 with a total investment of 300 mil. euros. On 15 March 2016 the model was revealed on site. The car turned out to be the Citroën C3 III.

Since 2019, the plant is the main manufacturer of the Peugeot 208 II. It is also the only manufacturer of the electric version of this model, the Peugeot e-208.

=== Peugeot ===
- Peugeot 207 (from June 2006 to 2012, 792,149 units assembled)
- Peugeot 208 I (from 2012 to September 2019, 1,275,058 units)
- Peugeot 208 II (since July 2019, 174,950 units as of late 2020)
- Peugeot e-208 (since November 2019, 40,597 units as of late 2020)

=== Citroën ===
- Citroën C3 Picasso (from September 2008 to June 2017, 501,956 units as of late 2020)
- Citroën C3 III (since September 2016, 931,316 units as of late 2020)

== Scale and purpose ==
The plant has a designed capacity to produce 300,000 cars annually, originally intended to employ 3,000 people organised into three shifts, which according to the manufacturer equates to an hourly output of 55 vehicles. The Trnava plant was built to produce the company's "Platform 1" cars, which are small cars. The first car to be produced in volume was the Peugeot 207 produced initially in October 2006 at a daily rate of 450, with an increase to 800 scheduled in time for Q2, 2007. With the 2013 production the factory was close to its planned capacity with daily production of 1200 cars and 3500 employees. In 2014 with 3500 employees and 255,176 cars was a capacity used to 85% including 30 days when it was not producing. General director of the plant Rémi Girardon confirmed in March 2015 a plan to produce third car model (Citroën) with a goal of 360.000 cars in 2017 and therefore from May 2015 hourly output will be increased to 57 to 60 vehicles with new employees. A fourth (weekend) shift will be introduced in 2016 and subsequently the number of employees will increase to 4200 by 2018.

== Departments ==
The plant comprises six principal departments, devoted respectively to Metal forming / presses, Welding based body assembly, painting, final assembly, logistics and quality.

== Wage levels ==
In 2006, shortly after the plant opened, there was much discussion in France of relative wage levels, with reports that the minimum wage at the Trnava factory was €183 per month and the average salary €450, although the salary of an assembly line worker would be only €350. Reference was also made to wages at the nearby Volkswagen plant being 85% lower than those of that company's German employees. PSA president Jean-Martin Folz played down the question of wage differentials, however, pointing out that Slovak auto-industry wage levels were likely to rise rapidly, since the area was quickly becoming a European centre of expertise and excellence for auto-makers, with a Volkswagen plant at Bratislava since 1991 and a Kia plant at Žilina, as well as other new auto-plants recently built across the frontier in the Czech Republic by international brands including Hyundai, Škoda and, in partnership with Toyota, by PSA themselves.

In the year 2015 the average monthly wage was €1.331 and wages below €850 will be specially compensated with 13th salary.
