= 2006 Paris Motor Show =

International auto show

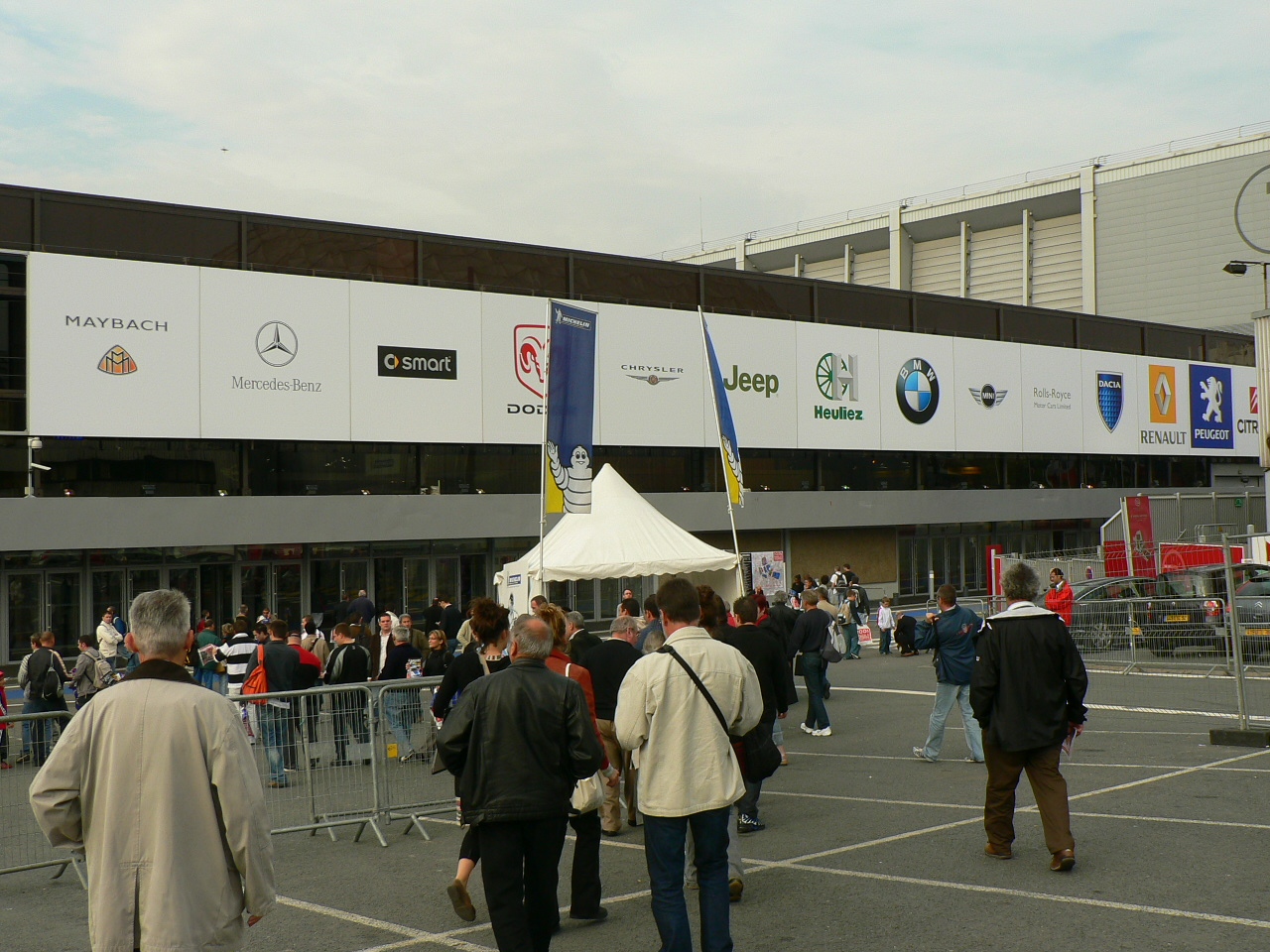
- Entrance door to the event
- Genre: Auto show
- Begins: September 30, 2006
- Ends: October 15, 2006
- Venue: Paris Expo Porte de Versailles
- Location: Paris
- Country: France
- Previous event: 2004 Paris Motor Show
- Next event: 2008 Paris Motor Show

The 2006 Paris Motor Show (Mondial de l'Automobile) took place from 30 September to 15 October 2006, in Paris expo Porte de Versailles, Paris, France.

== Introductions ==
=== Production cars ===
- Alfa Romeo 8C Competizione
- Audi A3 1.8 TFSI
- Audi S3
- Audi A4 2.8 FSI
- Audi R8
- Bentley Arnage facelift
- BMW 3 Series Coupe
- BMW X3 facelift
- BMW X5
- Chevrolet WTCC Ultra concept
- Chrysler Sebring (Europe introduction)
- Citroën C4 Picasso long wheelbase
- Citroën C4 WRC
- Citroën C-Métisse diesel-hybrid concept
- Dacia Logan (facelift) and Dacia Logan MCV (station wagon)
- Daihatsu D-Compact X-Over prototype
- Daihatsu Materia (Europe introduction)
- Dodge Avenger concept
- Dodge Nitro (Europe introduction)
- Fiat Panda Sport
- Ford Iosis X concept
- Ford Mondeo Wagon concept
- Great Wall Hover (Europe introduction)
- Honda Civic Type-R
- Honda CR-V
- Honda FR-V facelift
- Hyundai Arnejs concept
- Hyundai Grandeur 2.2 CRDi
- Hyundai Coupé facelift (Europe introduction)
- Kia cee'd 5-door hatchback & station wagon
- Kia Opirus facelift (Europe introduction)
- Kia pro_cee'd 3-door hatchback concept
- Lamborghini Gallardo Nera (Special Edition)
- Lamborghini Murciélago LP-640-4 Versace (Limited Edition)
- Lancia Delta HPE concept
- Lancia Ypsilon facelift
- Land Rover Defender facelift
- Land Rover Freelander
- Landwind Fashion
- Lexus LS600h (Europe introduction)
- Maserati GranSport
- Mazda CX-7 (Europe introduction)
- Mazda MX-5 Power Retractable Hard Top
- Mercedes-Benz CL-Class
- Mercedes-Benz CL 63 AMG
- Mercedes-Benz SLR McLaren 722 Edition
- MINI Cooper and Cooper S
- Mitsubishi Outlander concept (Europe introduction)
- Mitsubishi Pajero
- Nissan Qashqai
- Opel Antara
- Opel Corsavan concept
- Peugeot 207 Epure concept
- Peugeot 207 Spyder track car
- Peugeot 908 HDi FAP Le Mans
- Peugeot 908 RC concept
- Renault Koléos concept
- Renault Nepta concept
- Renault Scenic facelift
- Renault Twingo concept
- SEAT Altea XL
- Škoda Joyster concept
- Škoda Octavia Scout
- Smart Fortwo Edition Red (Special Edition)
- SsangYong Actyon (Europe introduction)
- Subaru B9 Tribeca (Europe introduction)
- Subaru Impreza 1.5 R (Europe introduction)
- Subaru Legacy/Outback facelift (Europe introduction)
- Suzuki Splash concept
- Suzuki Swift Sport (Europe introduction)
- Toyota Auris Space concept
- Toyota Yaris TS
- Volkswagen CrossGolf
- Volkswagen Iroc concept
- Volkswagen Touareg facelift
- Volkswagen Touran facelift
- Volvo C30

=== Motorsport cars ===
- Audi R10 TDI Diesel Le Mans Prototype (Winning Car)
- Citroen C4 WRC
- Porsche 911 a.k.a. Porsche 997 N4 Toulemonde for Porsche Carrera Cup
- Porsche 911 GT3 RSR a.k.a. Porsche 996 GT3 RSR Team IMSA Performance Matmut
- Subaru WRX STI Rally Car
- Suzuki SX4 WRC

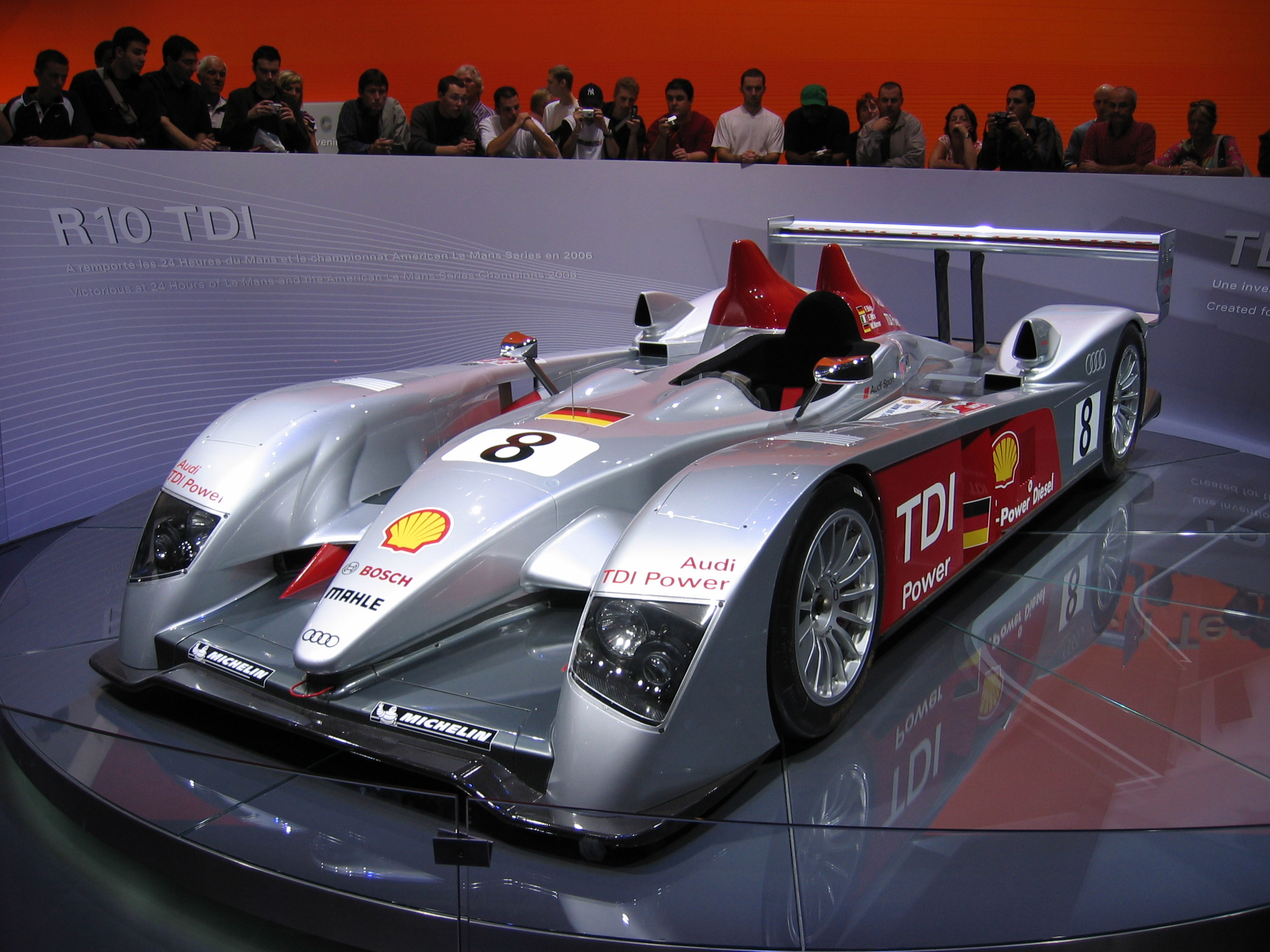
Audi R10 TDI at Paris 2006

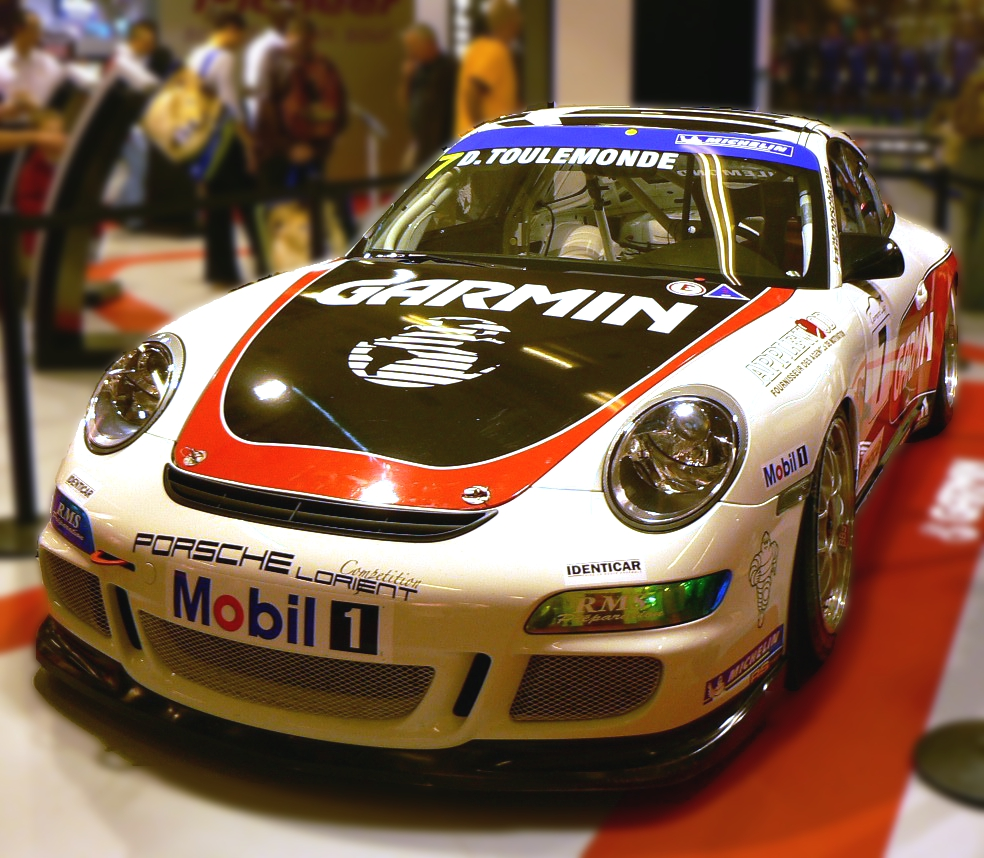
Porsche 997 Toulemonde at Paris 2006

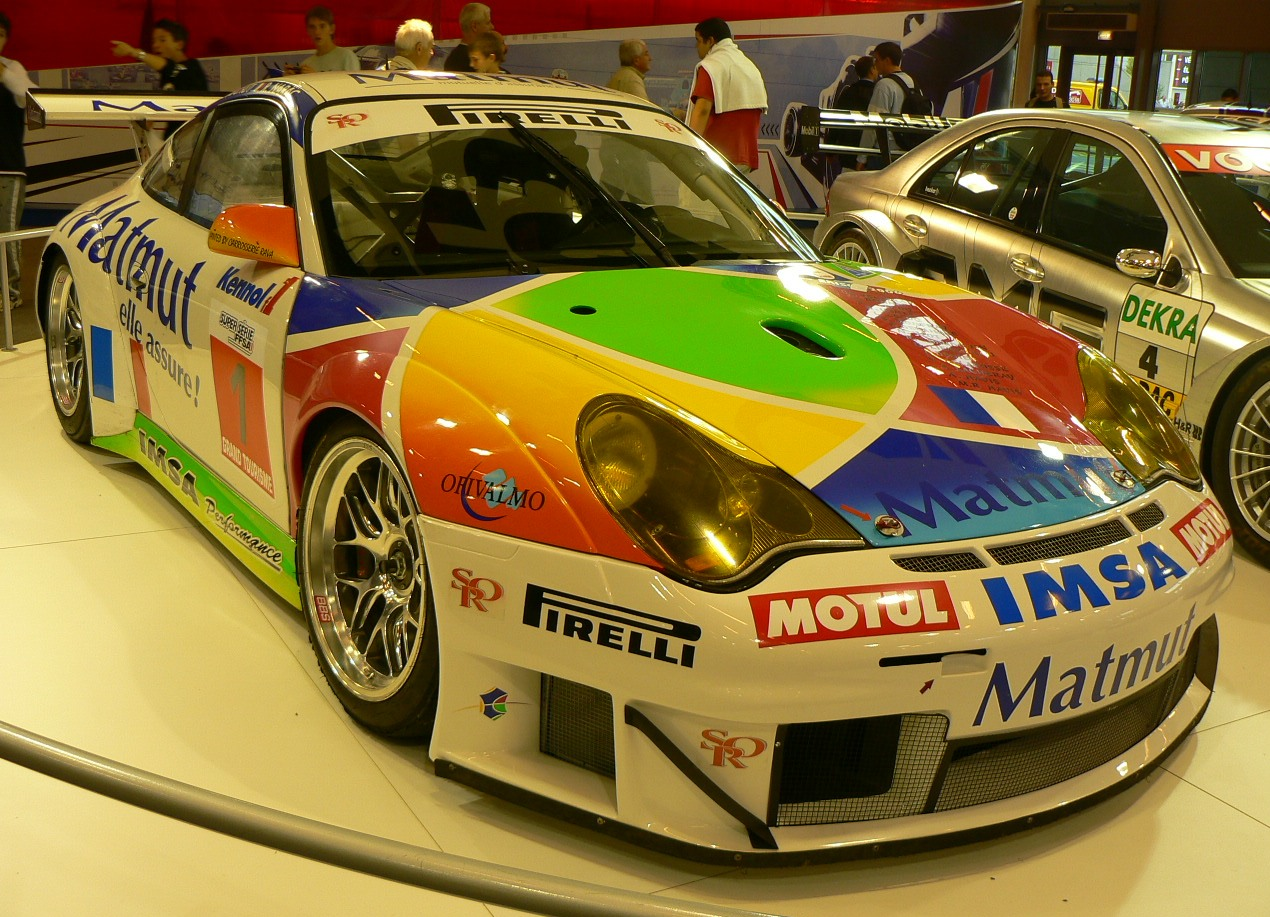
Porsche 996 GT3 RSR Matmut at Paris 2006

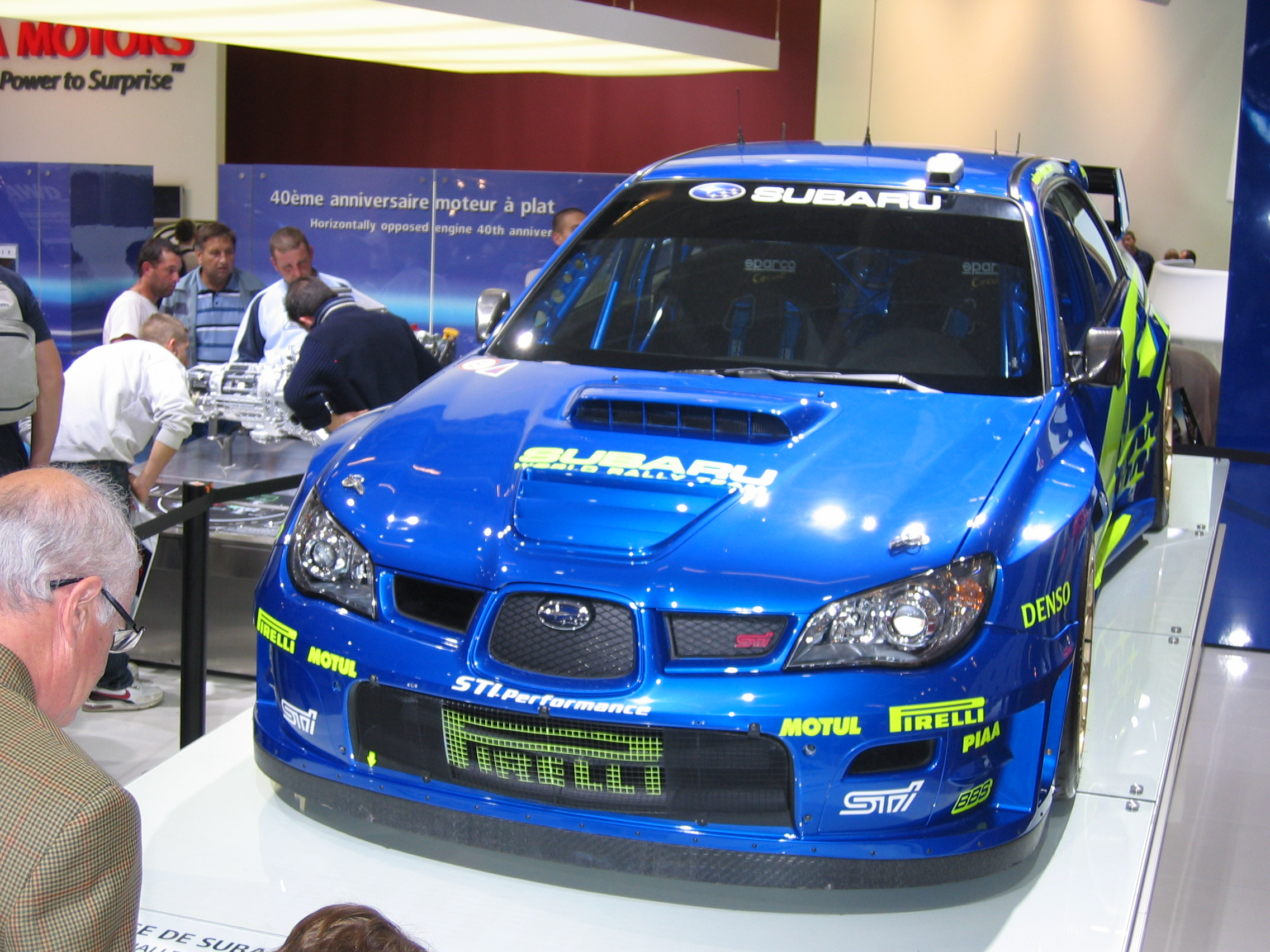
Subaru WRX STI at Paris 2006

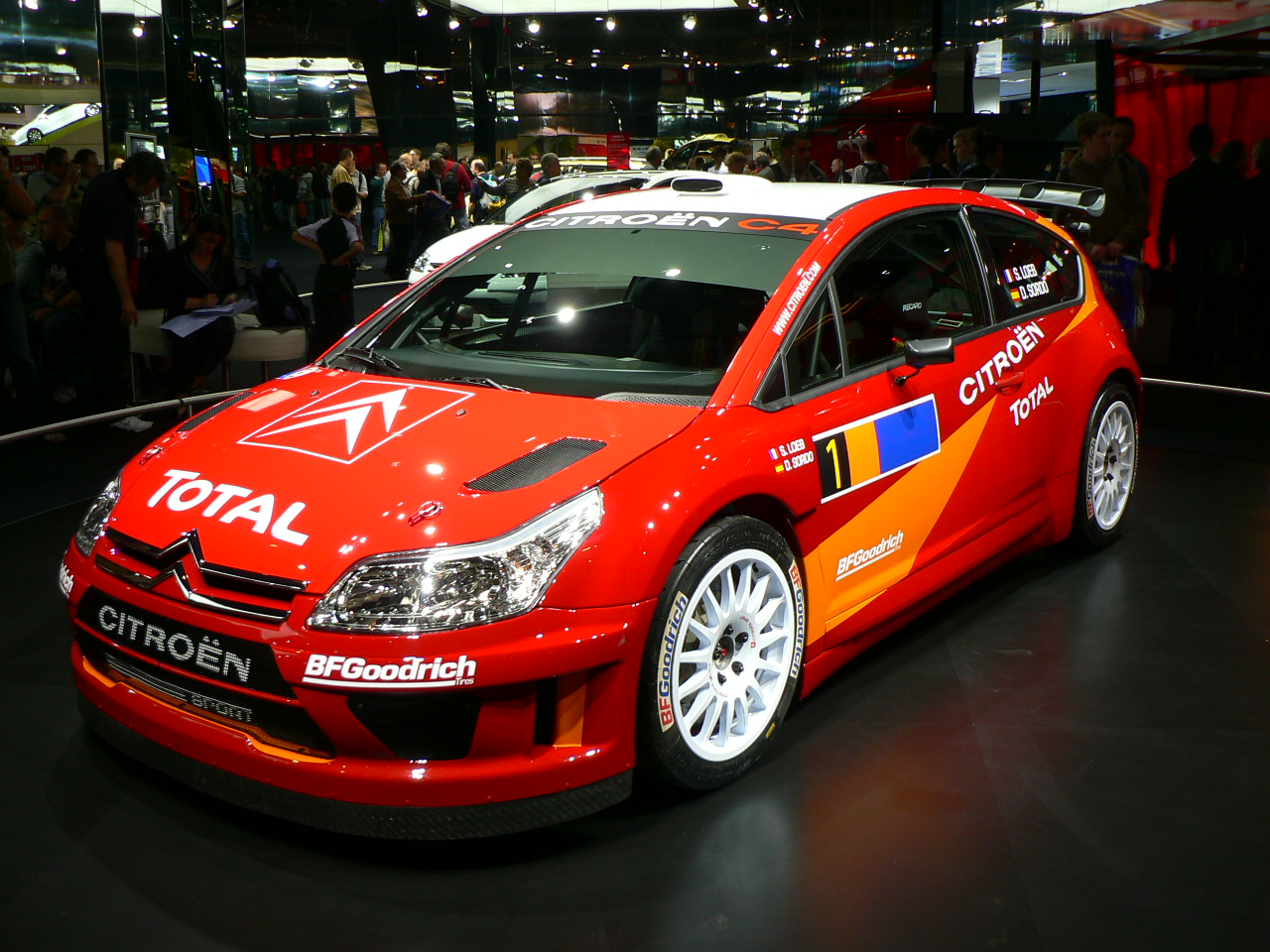
Citroen C4 WRC at Paris 2006

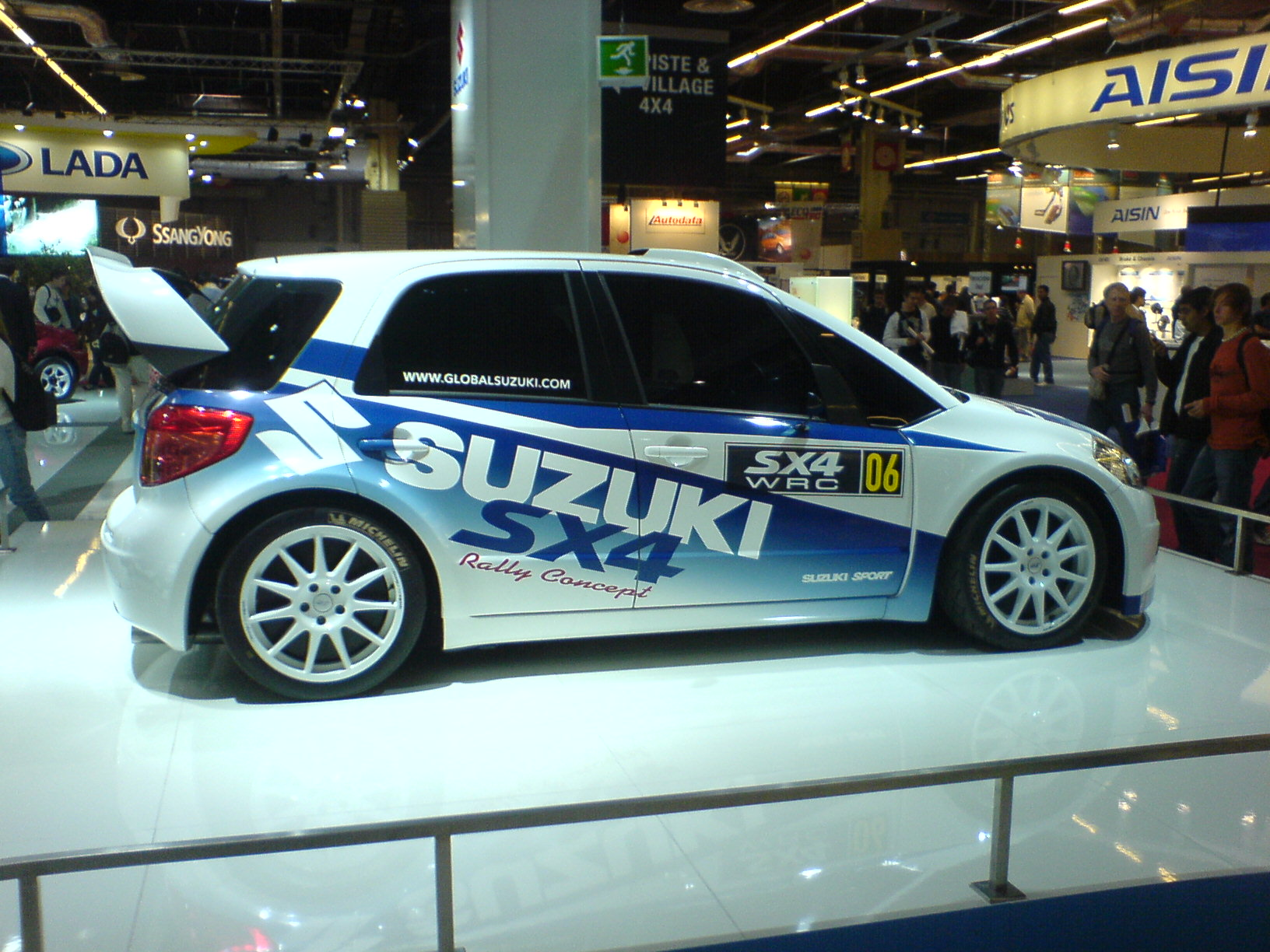
Suzuki SX4 WRC at Paris 2006

== See also ==
- Paris Motor Show
