= Renault Nepta =

Nepta
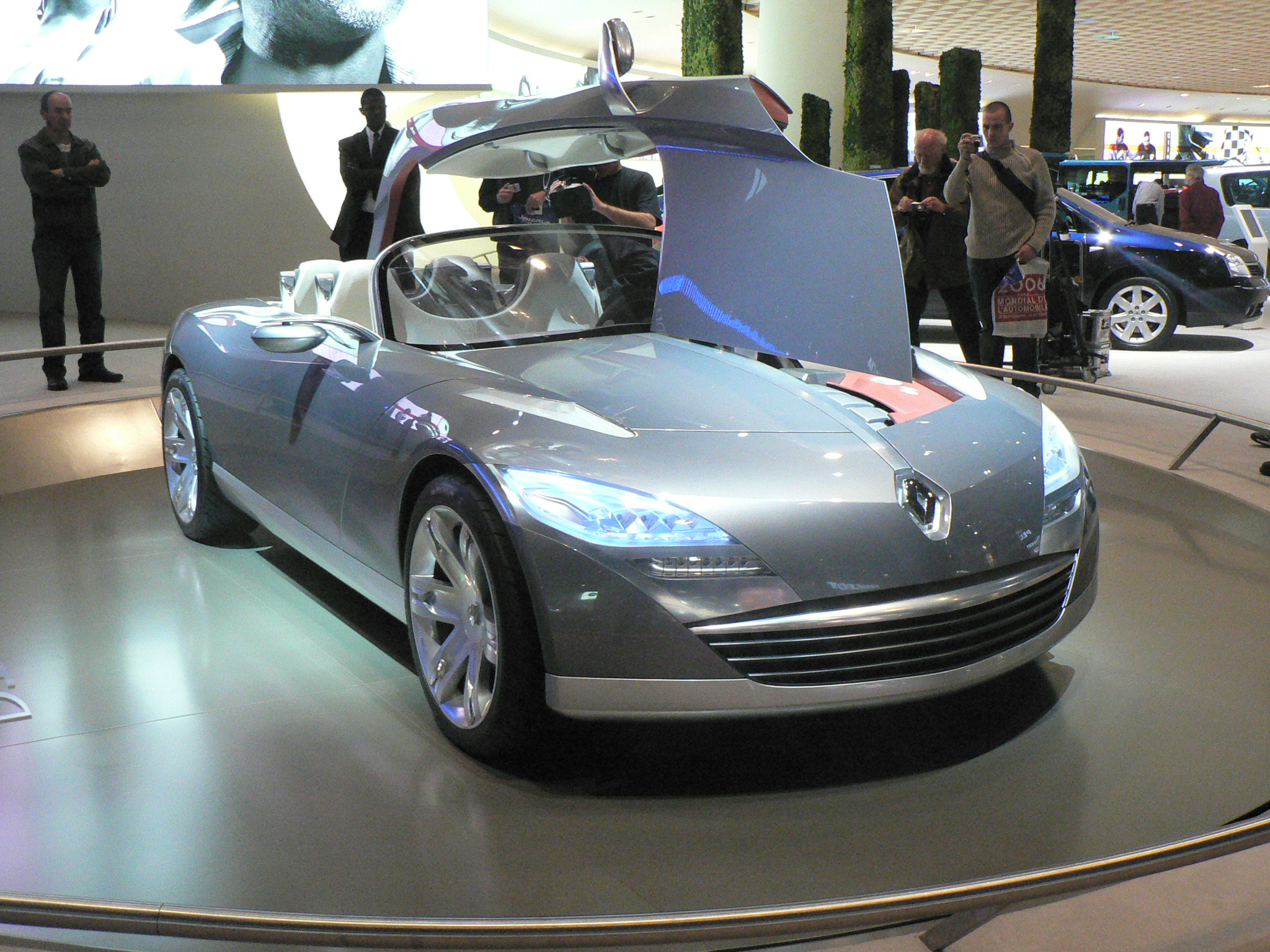

Overview
- Manufacturer: Renault
- Production: 2006 (Concept car)
- Designer: Patrick le Quément

Body and chassis
- Class: Grand tourer
- Body style: 2-door convertible
- Layout: FR layout
- Doors: Gull-wing

Powertrain
- Engine: 3.5L VQ35DE V6
- Transmission: 7-speed automatic

Dimensions
- Length: 4,995 mm (196.7 in)
- Width: 1,956 mm (77.0 in)
- Height: 1,332 mm (52.4 in)

The Renault Nepta was a concept grand tourer made by Renault which was presented at the Mondial de l'Automobile 2006. It was designed by Patrick le Quément and was unusual for Renault in that it was rear-wheel drive with a large petrol engine.

== Technical details ==
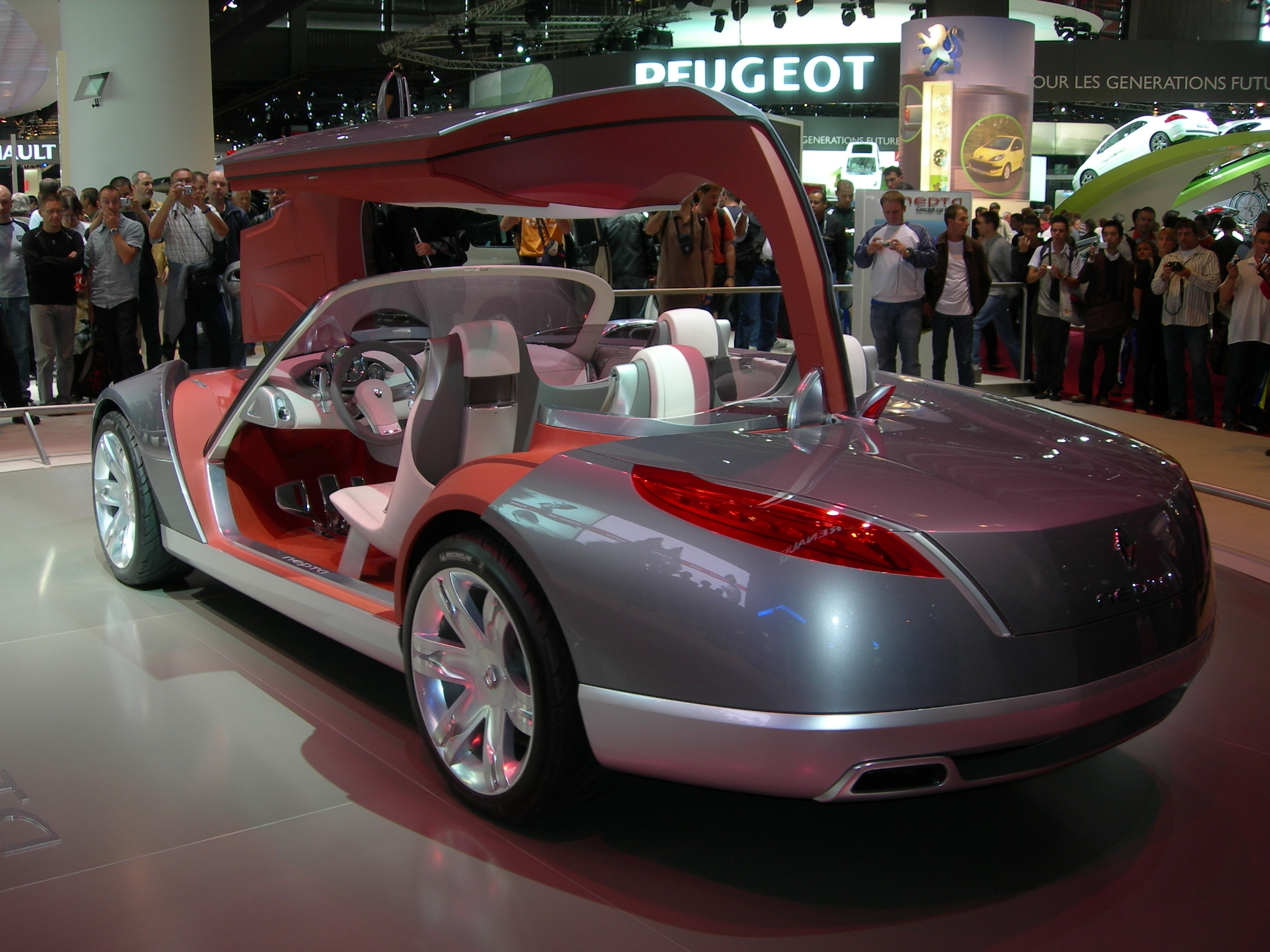
Renault Nepta rear

It is equipped with a direct injection twin turbo 3.5 L petrol V6 producing 414 hp (309 kW) and was coupled to a paddle-shift seven-speed automatic gearbox. The Nepta could accelerate to 62 mph in 4.9 seconds.
