= 207th Division =

207th Division or 207th Infantry Division may refer to:

- 207th Division (3rd Formation) (People's Republic of China), September–December 1949
- 207th Security Division, Wehrmacht, Germany
- 207th Coastal Division, Italy
- 207th Rifle Division, Soviet Union

== See also ==
- List of military divisions by number
- 207th Regiment (disambiguation)
- 207th (disambiguation)
