= Peugeot 207 =

Supermini car produced by Peugeot (2006–2015)

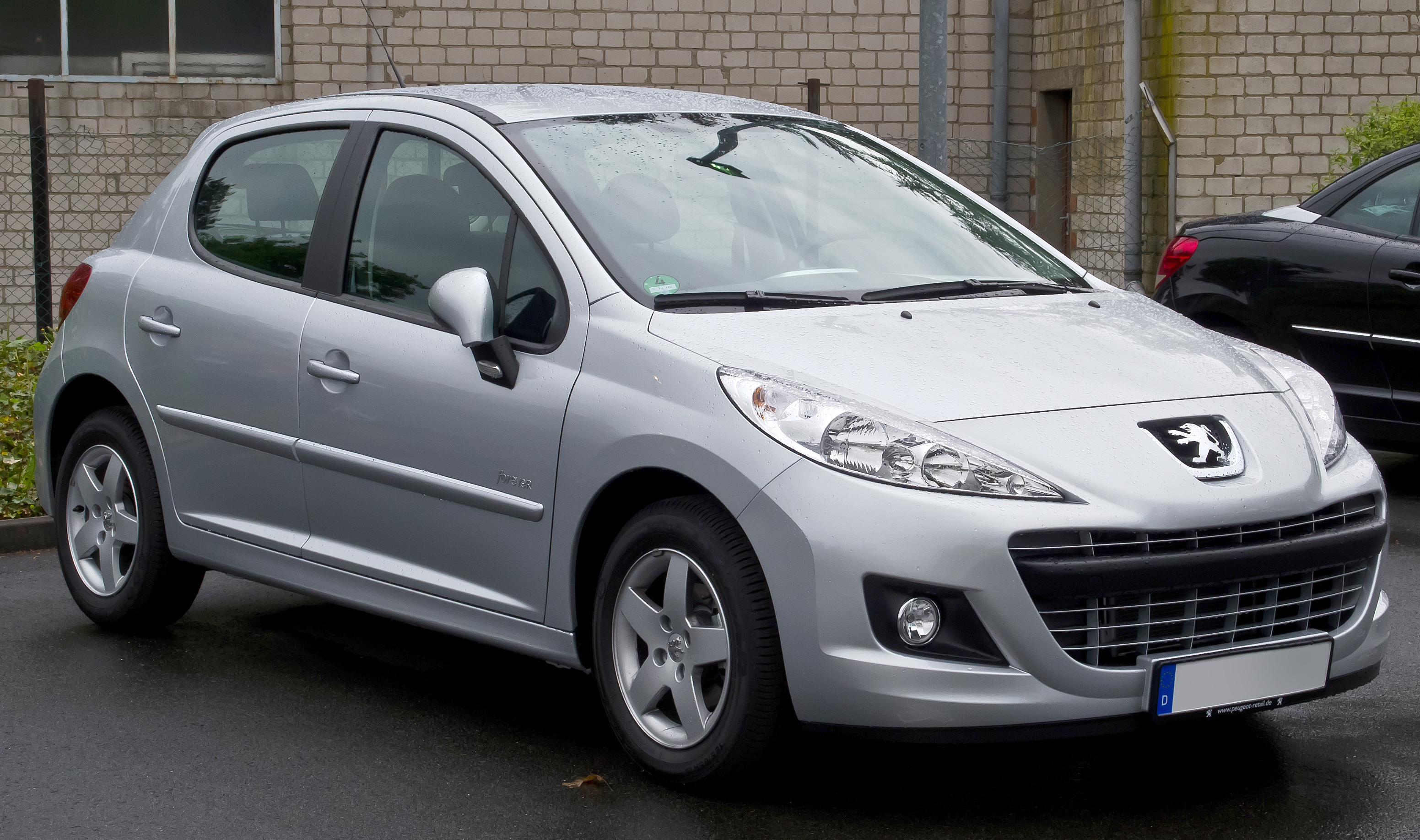
- 2012 Peugeot 207

Overview
- Manufacturer: Peugeot
- Production: 2006–2015
- Assembly: France: Poissy (Poissy Plant); Spain: Madrid (Madrid Plant); Slovakia: Trnava (Trnava Plant)

Body and chassis
- Class: Supermini (B)
- Body style: 3/5-door hatchback 2-door coupé cabriolet (207 CC); 5-door estate (207 SW)
- Layout: Front-engine, front-wheel-drive
- Platform: PSA PF1 platform
- Related: Citroën C3; Peugeot 208; Peugeot 2008; Citroën C3 Aircross; Opel Crossland; Citroën C4 Cactus; DS 3

Powertrain
- Engine: Petrol: 1.4 L TU3JP I4 8V; 1.4 L ET3J4 I4 16V; 1.4 L Prince I4 16V (VTi); 1.6 L TU5JP4 I4 16V; 1.6 L Prince I4 16V (VTi); 1.6 L Prince I4 16V turbo (THP); Diesel: 1.4 L PSA DV4 I4 8V (HDi); 1.6 L PSA DV6 I4 16V (HDi)
- Transmission: 5-speed manual 6-speed manual 5-speed semi automatic 4-speed automatic

Dimensions
- Wheelbase: 2,540 mm (100.0 in)
- Length: 4,045 mm (159.3 in) (hatchback); 4,164 mm (163.9 in) (station wagon); 4,037 mm (158.9 in) (coupé)
- Width: 1,748 mm (68.8 in)
- Height: 1,472 mm (58.0 in)
- Curb weight: 1,243–1,283 kg (2,740–2,829 lb)

Chronology
- Predecessor: Peugeot 206
- Successor: Peugeot 208; Peugeot 2008 (207 SW)

The Peugeot 207 is a supermini car (B) that was designed and produced by the French automaker Peugeot from 2006 to 2014. It was presented at the Geneva Motor Show in 2006, and entered production in April 2006, as the successor to the Peugeot 206. It shares the same platform with the Citroën C3.

The Peugeot 207 was replaced in April 2012 by the Peugeot 208, which is built on the same platform.

== Launch ==
The 207 was launched in France, Spain, and Italy during April 2006, and later on in other markets in Europe and the Middle East. In January 2004, Peugeot decided not to manufacture the 207 in Ryton.

The launch for the United Kingdom was on 8 June 2006. Amicus and the TGWU, both unions representing workers at PSA's manufacturing plant in Ryton, Coventry, chose the same day to launch a campaign calling for the boycott of PSA's Peugeot and Citroën vehicles in the United Kingdom, to protest against the company's plans to close the plant. Peugeot's United Kingdom sales grew, despite the resulting boycott.

Prior to the launch, Peugeot launched a campaign for the 207 on MSN.

== Design and specification ==
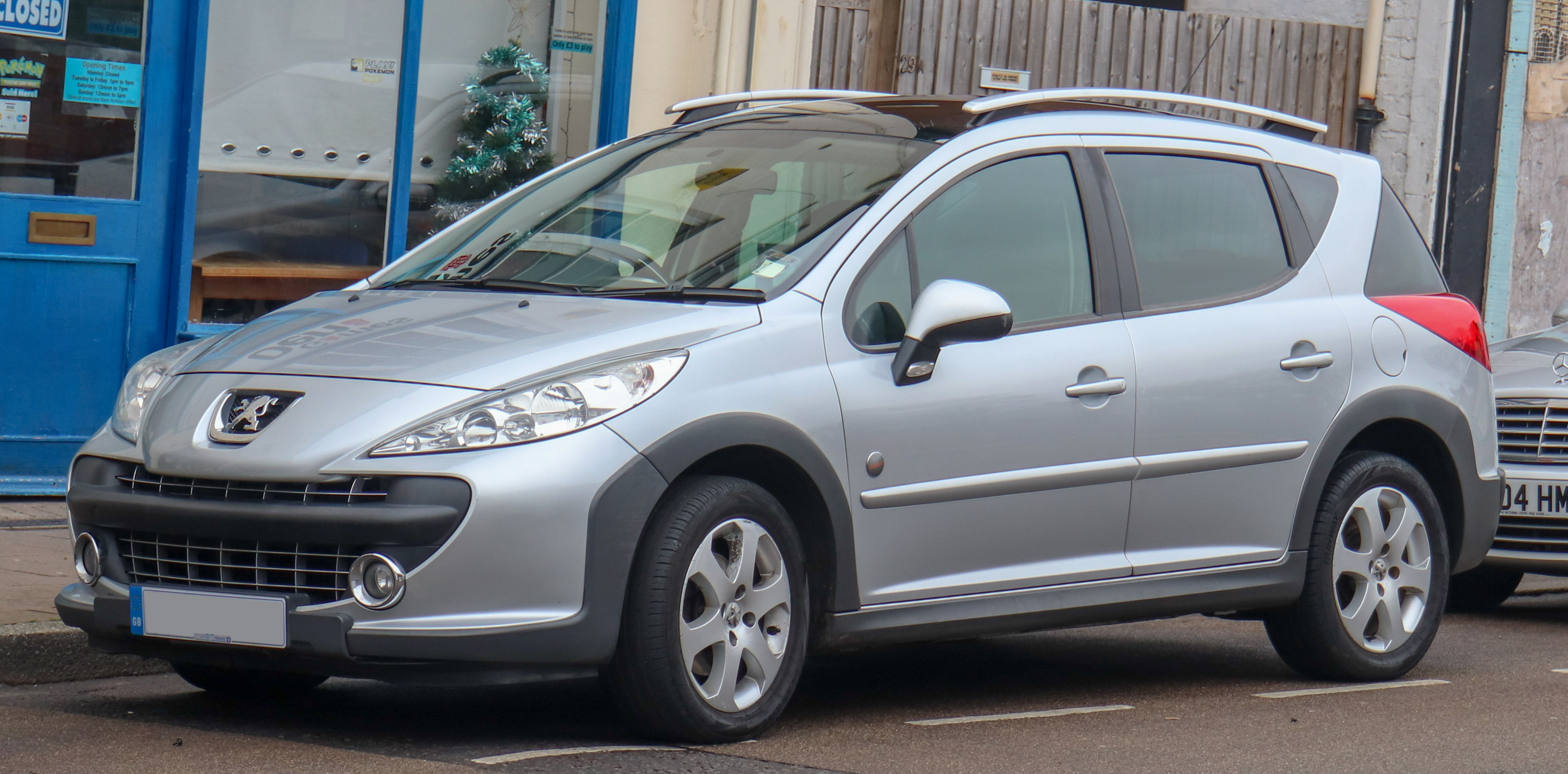

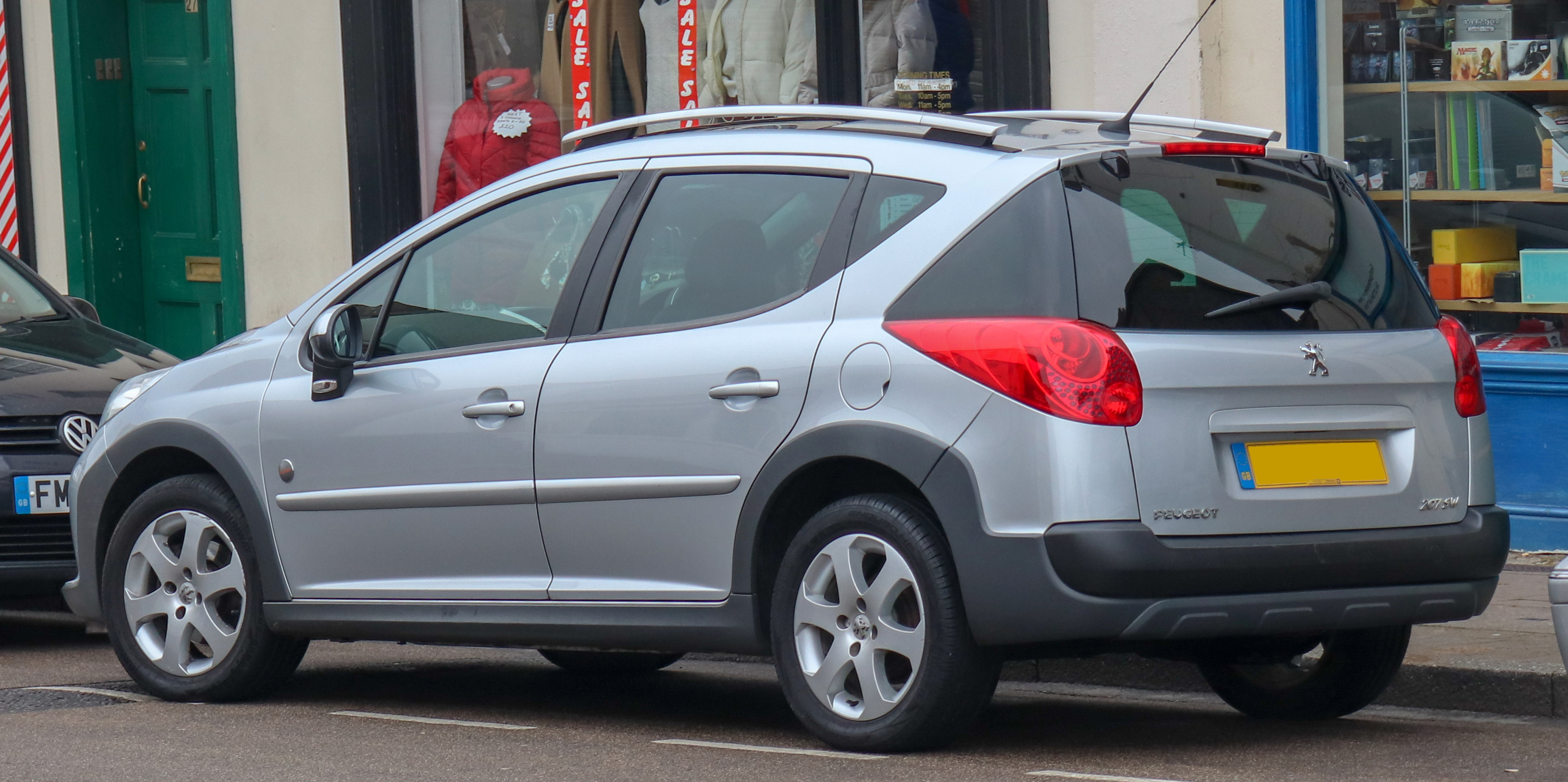
2008 Peugeot 207 SW Outdoor 90

The 207 was the successor to the 206. The 207 was based on a modified version of the platform used for the Citroën C3 and was built in Poissy (France), Madrid (Spain) and a new plant in Trnava, Slovakia.

Initially, three petrol engines were available: 1.4-litre 8v with 75 or 16v 90 hp (67 kW; 91 PS) and 1.6 litre 16v with 110 bhp (82 kW; 112 PS). From the end of 2006, the 1.4 and 1.6 16v models were replaced by the new 1.4 vti 95 bhp (71 kW; 96 PS) and 1.6 vti a 120 bhp (89 kW; 122 PS) Valvetronic engines.

Two turbocharged and intercooled versions, one with 150 bhp (112 kW; 152 PS), and the other with 175 bhp (130 kW; 177 PS) were also added to the range. The latter four engines result from the cooperation agreement between PSA and the BMW Group; and can also be found in the Mini Cooper S. The diesel powered engines available are a 1.4 litre 67 hp (50 kW) or a 1.6 litre HDi with maximum output of 90 hp (67 kW) or 110 hp (82 kW), the latter with the addition of an intercooler.

The 207 was available as a three- or five-door hatchback, a 207 SW station wagon and the 207 coupé cabriolet (207 CC), which was launched in December 2006, as a replacement for the ageing 206 CC retractable hardtop, with engine choice limited to either the 1.6l HDi or 1.6l Vti.

A panel van 207 Van model was presented at the Commercial Vehicle Show in Birmingham, UK, and sold in the United Kingdom. The commercial 207 kept its side windows in most other markets, such as France, where it was marketed as 207 Affaire.

A GTI (or RC in some markets) version was also available, with the THP175 175 hp (130 kW) turbocharged 1.6 litre engine. A GT (or Limitee) version is also available, but is only sold with the THP150 150 hp (110 kW) turbocharged 1.6 litre engine, and also features a glass roof.

Both the GTI and GT versions are sold exclusively with manual gearboxes. The car was facelifted in July 2009, receiving a slightly smaller grille and revised front lighting, including new fog lamp housings, along with LED lights on the rear. Some engine management software changes were also made, boosting the power of the GTI from 175 hp (130 kW) to 184 hp (137 kW).

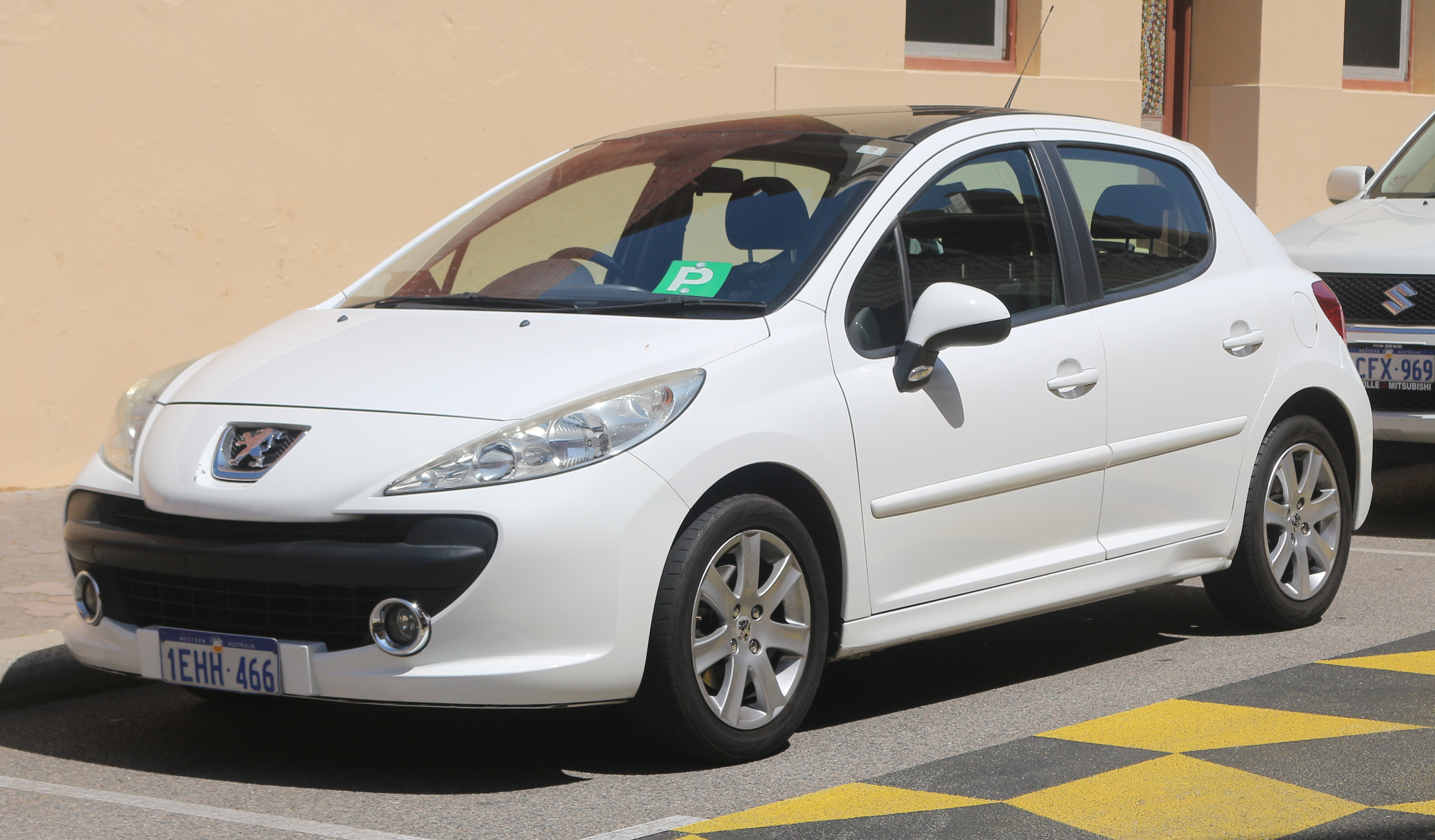
5-door hatchback (pre-facelift)

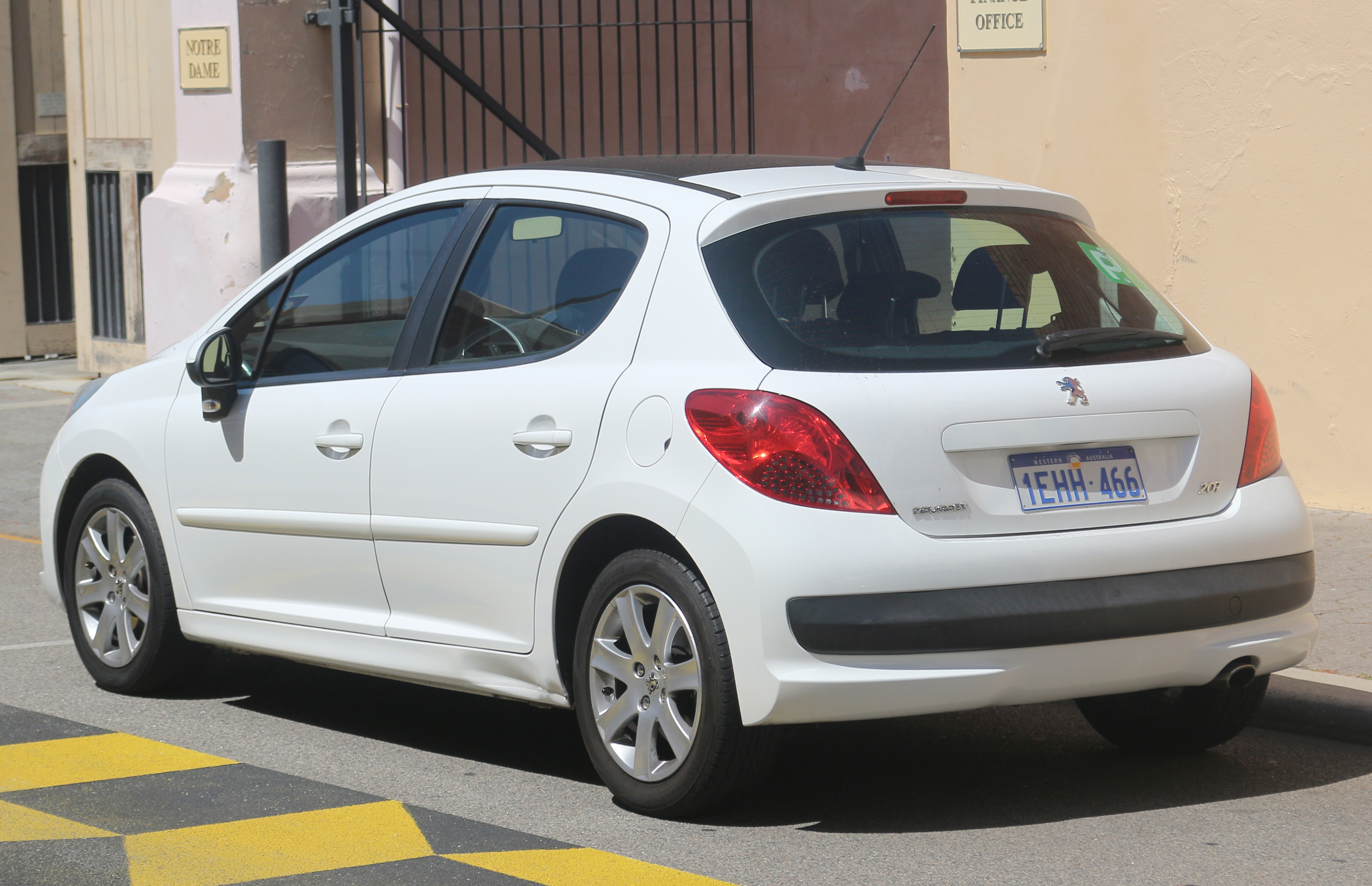
5-door hatchback (pre-facelift)

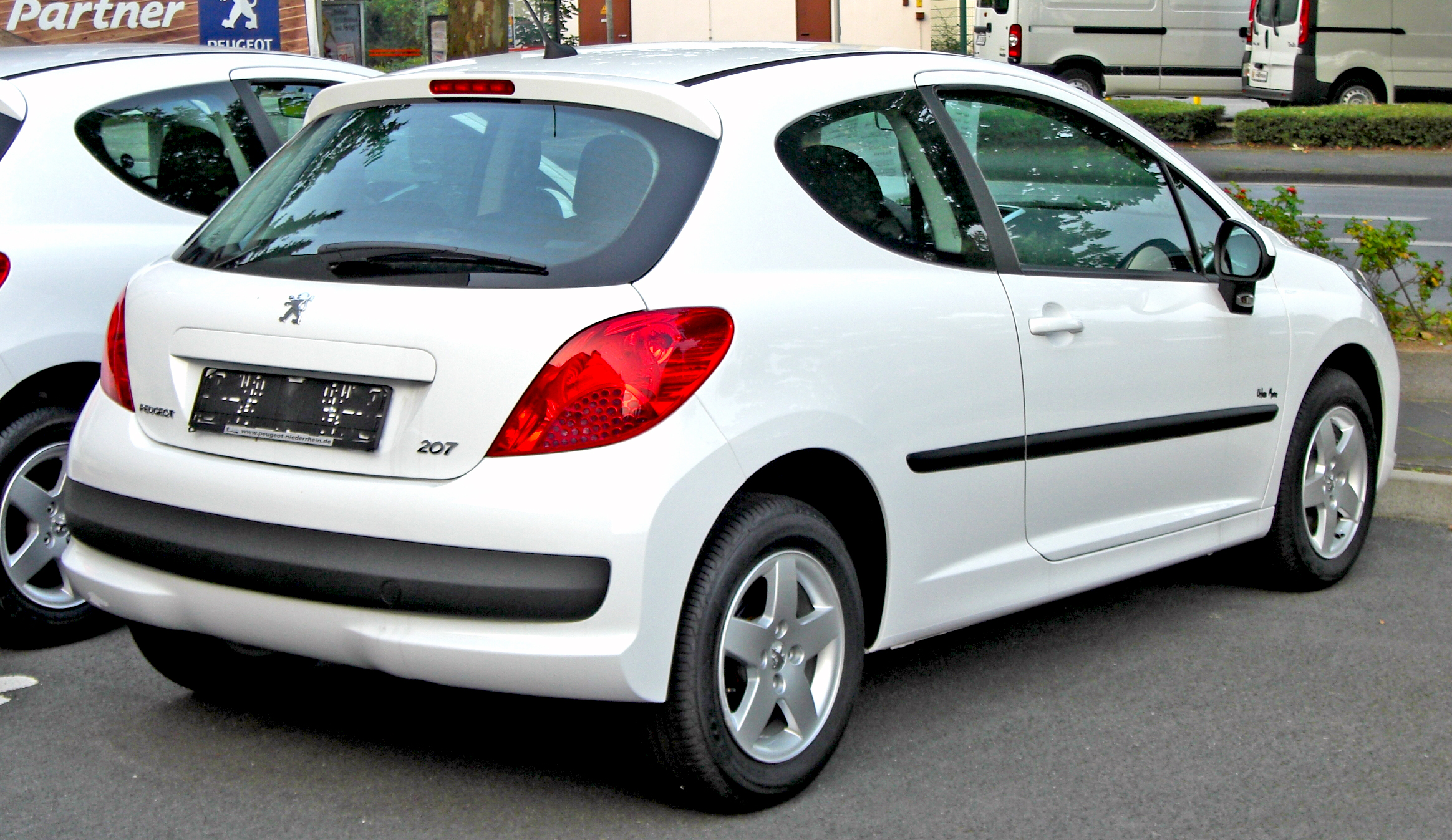
3-door hatchback (pre facelift)

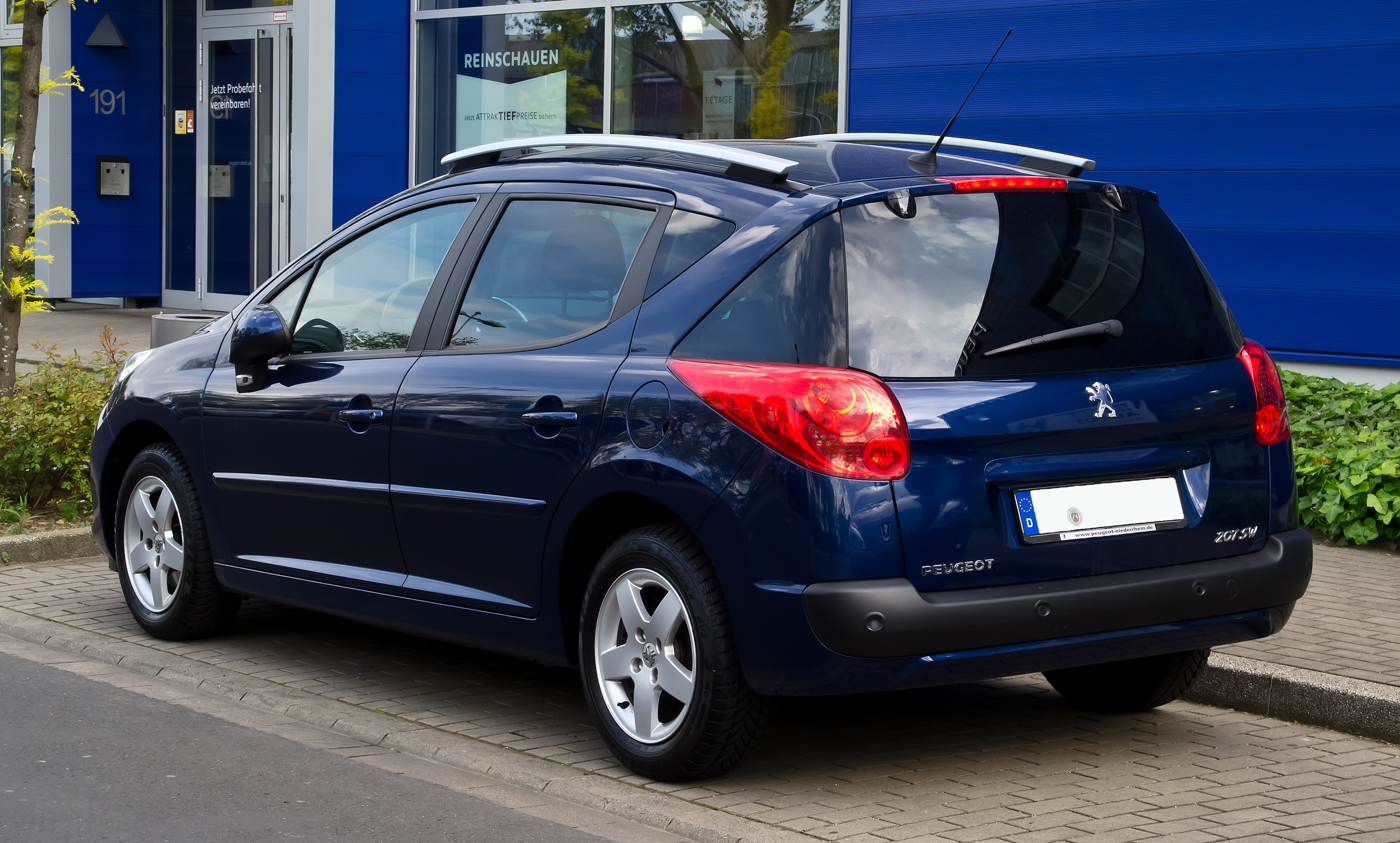
SW (pre-facelift)

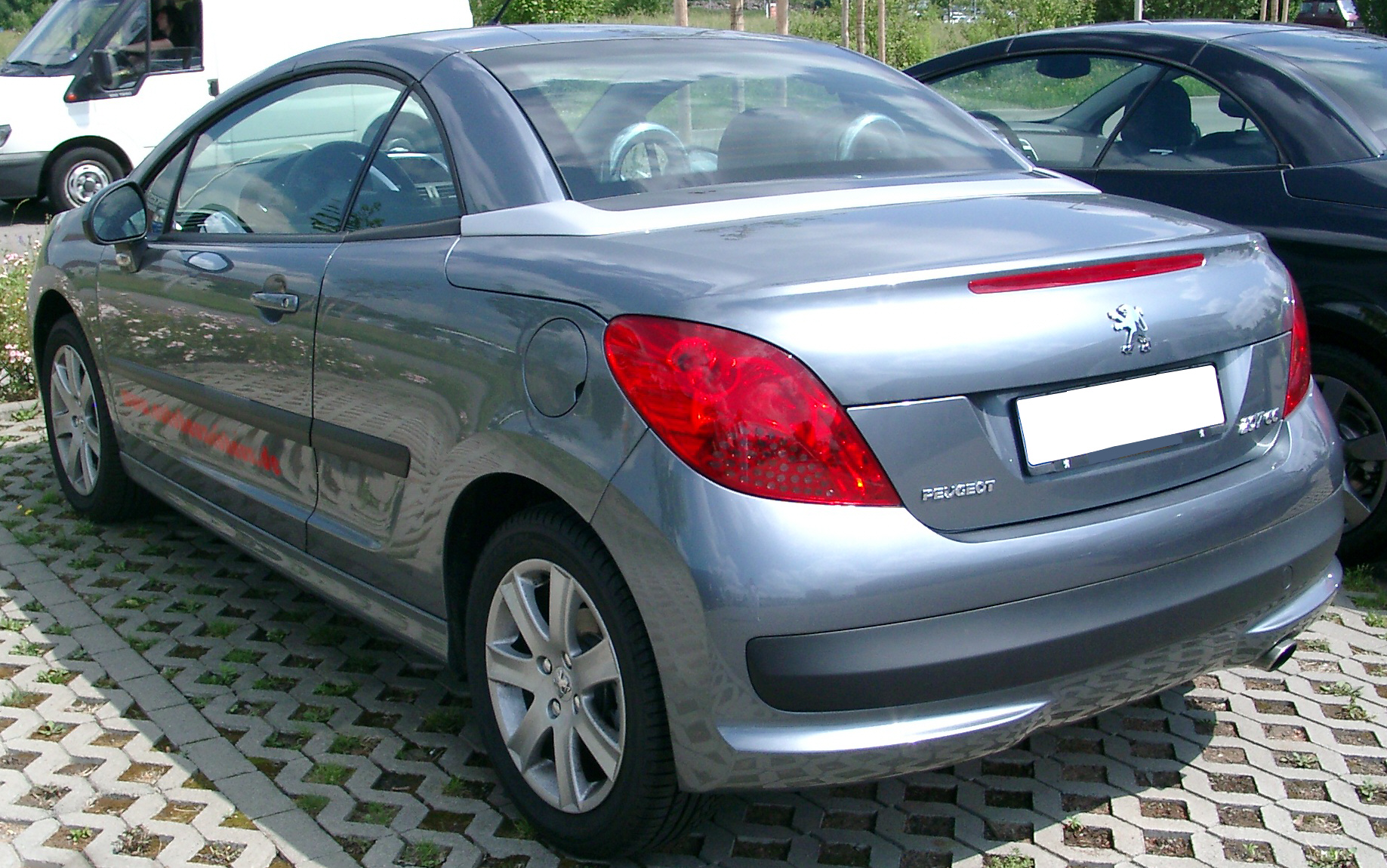
CC (pre-facelift)

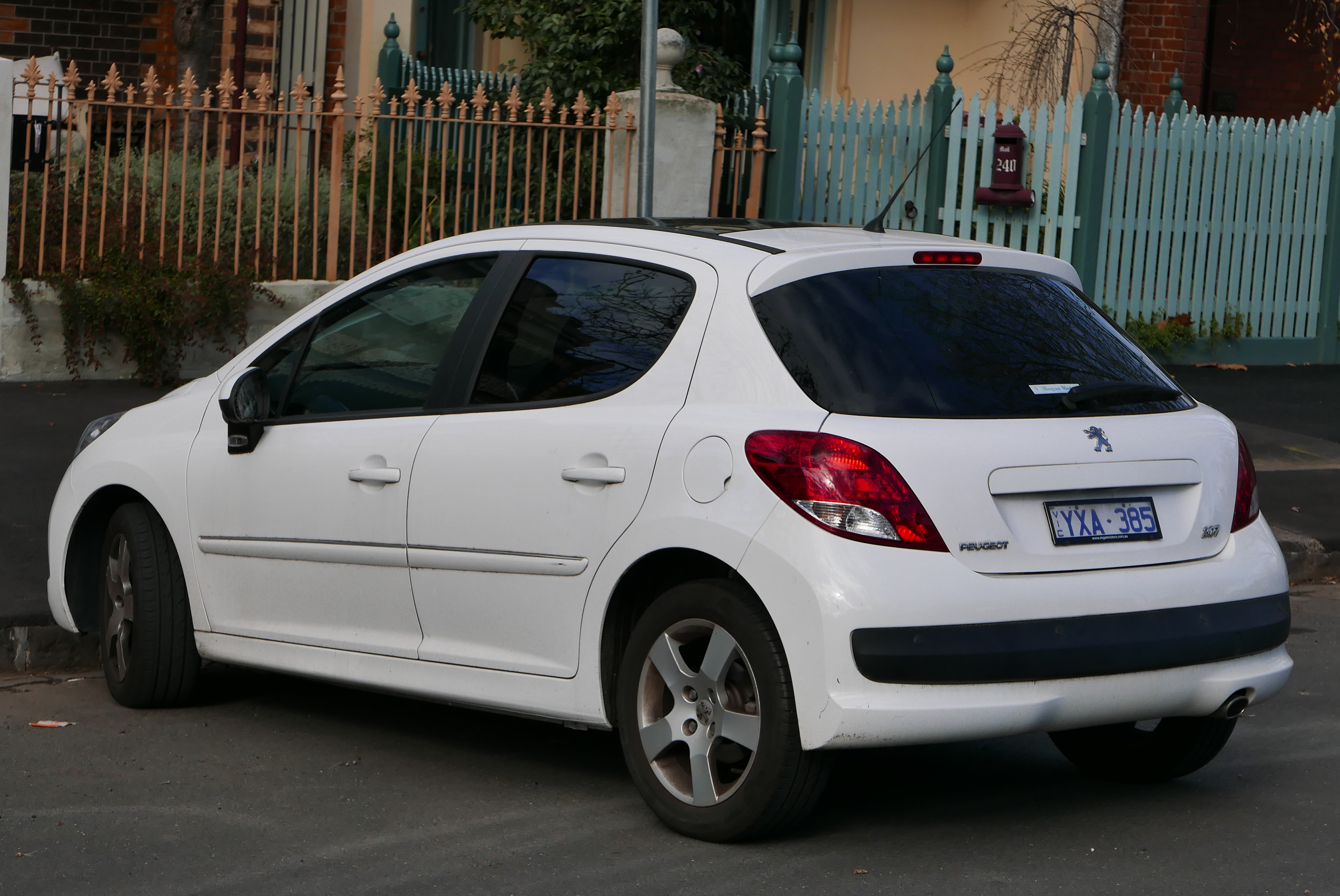
5-door hatchback (facelift)

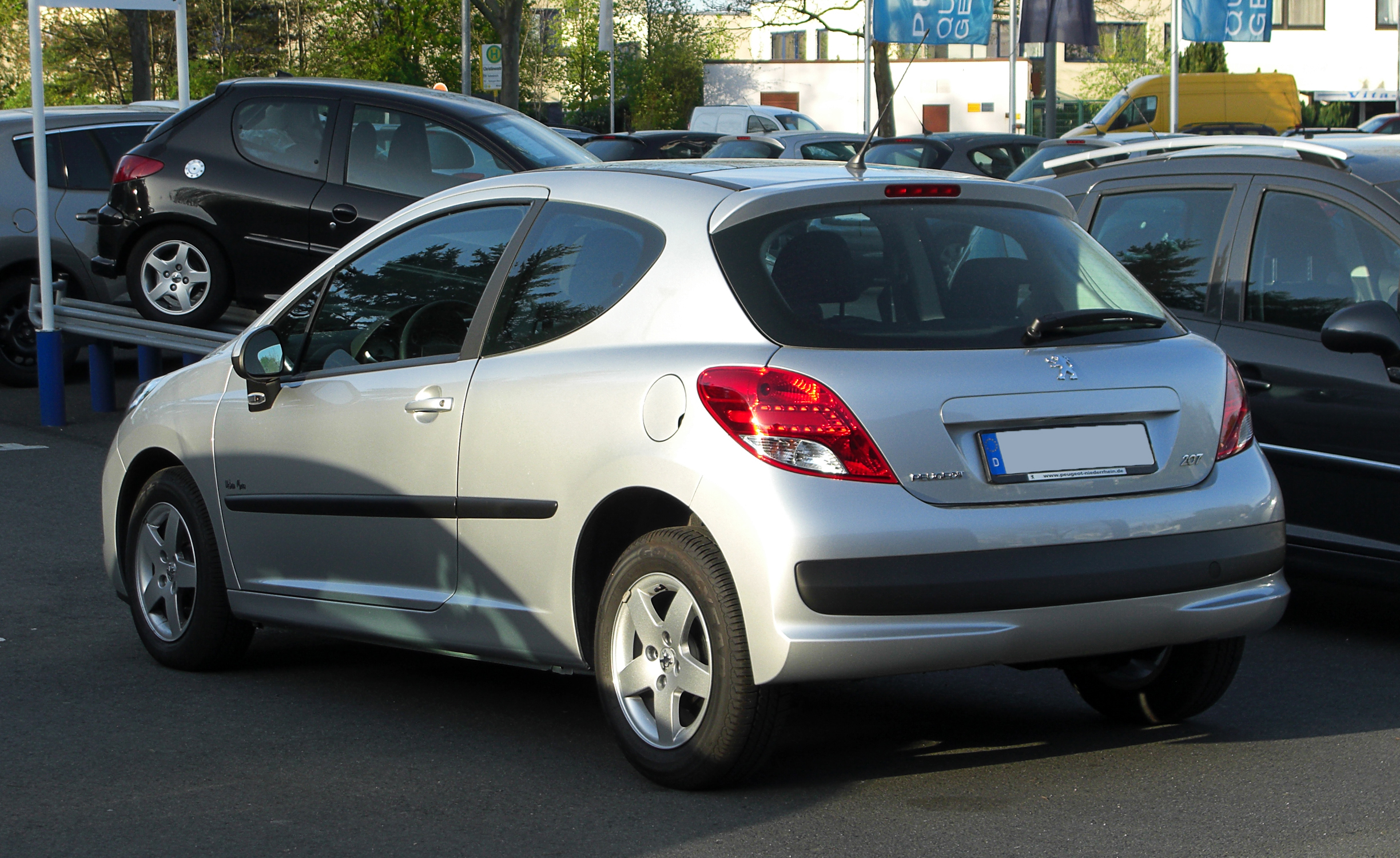
3-door hatchback (facelift)

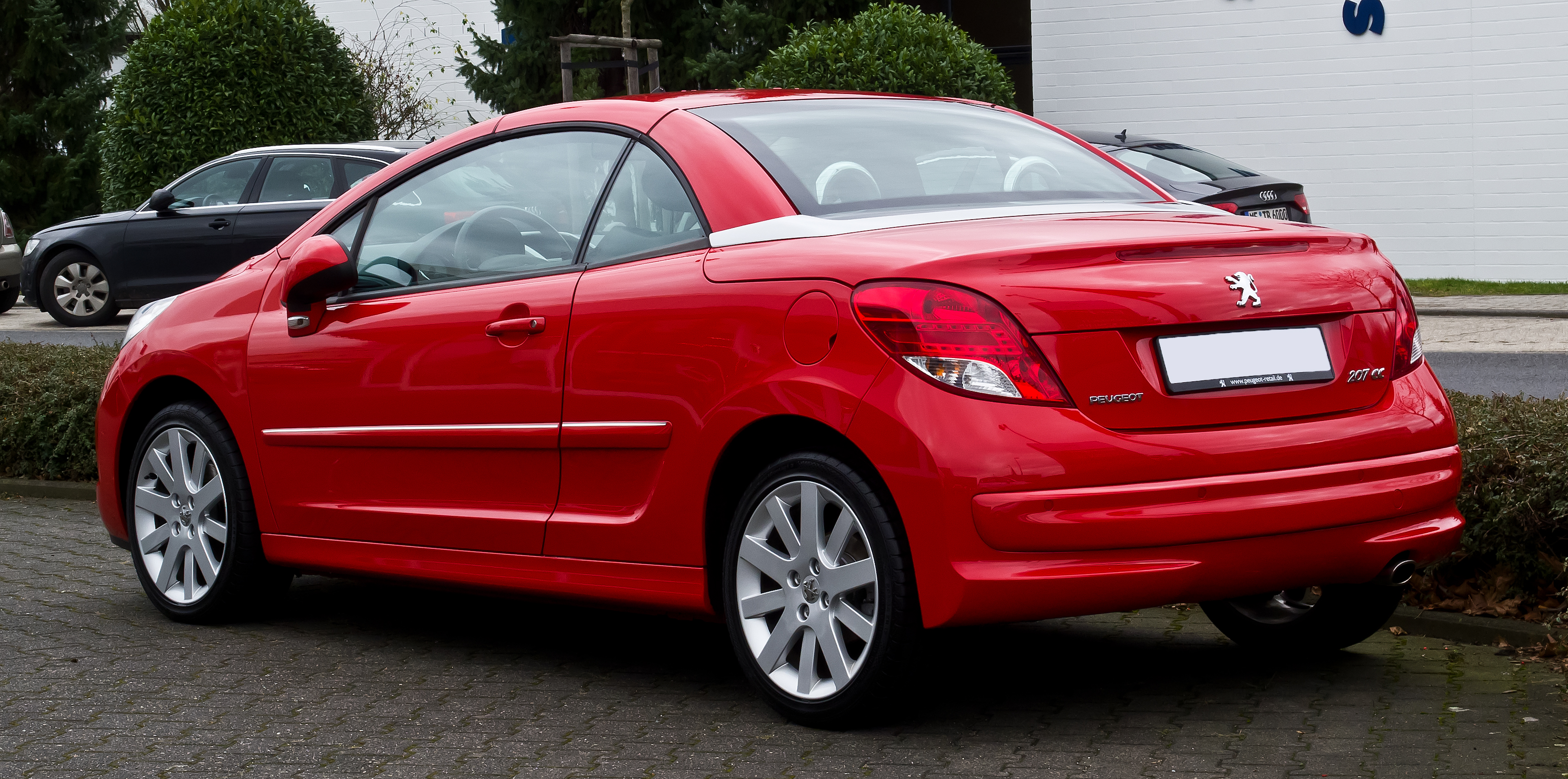
CC (facelift)

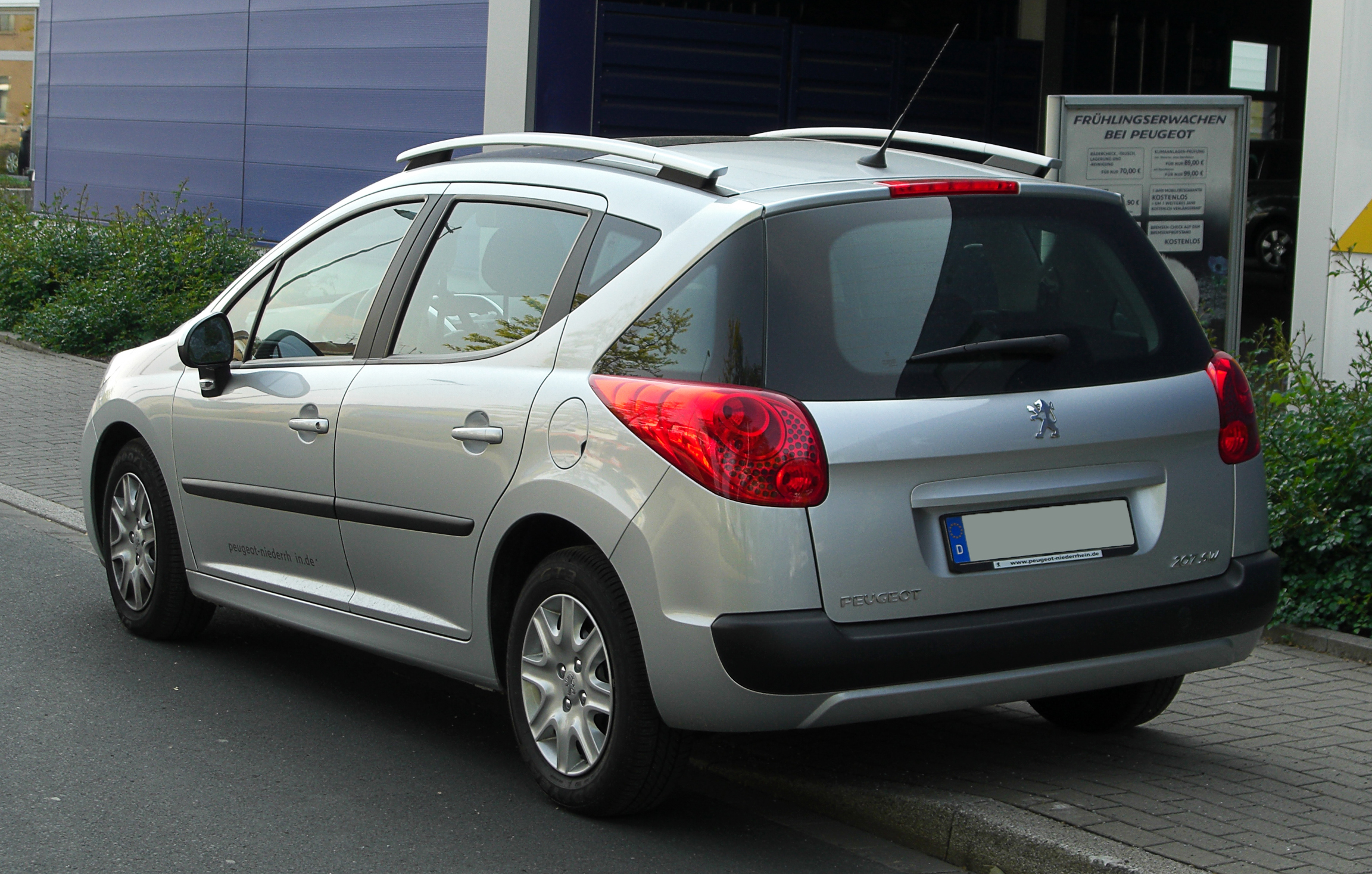
SW (facelift)

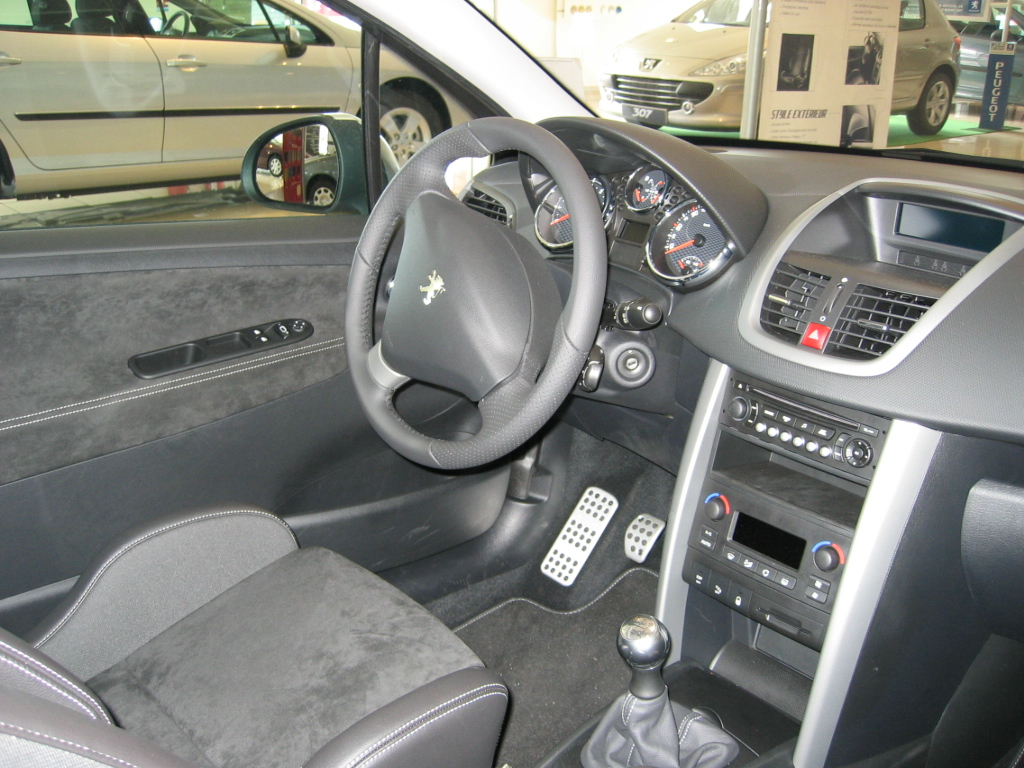
Interior

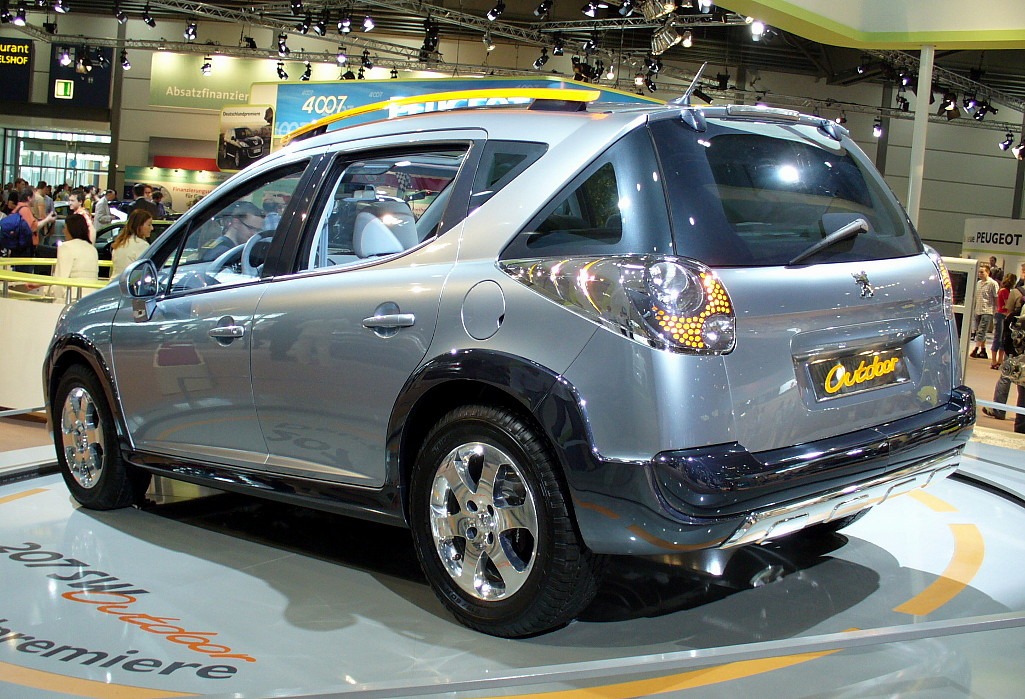
Peugeot 207 SW Outdoor Concept

=== Le Mans Special Edition ===
After just securing the top three positions in qualifying for the 24 Hours of Le Mans endurance race, Peugeot had fittingly released details for a Peugeot 207 Le Mans Series special edition model. With only 2,000 units produced, the 207 Le Mans Series was distinguished on the outside with a sport front bumper with Shadow aluminium grille and Black Chrome headlights.

The body side moldings, bumpers strips, and side view mirror housings were painted body color, while a long racing stripe got trimmed along the bonnet, roof, and rear spoiler. Other decal accents included a Peugeot logo, striping on the doors and Le Mans logos on the liftgate. Also special multispoke 17 inch Pitlane aluminium wheels set the tone of the vehicle. Exterior colours were Banquise White and Obsidien Black.

Carried over from the 207 RC, the interior received granium finish decor with front and rear bucket seats as well as RC front and rear mat covers. The steering wheel too, with a granium finish ring and numbered from 1 to 2,000. The gearshift lever knob, pedal assembly, foot rest and door sill are in aluminium.

Three engines were available with the 207 Le Mans Series. Starting with the 1.6 HDi 16v 110 hp DPFS and 1.6 THP150 16v 150 hp engines each of which receive a chrome plated single exhaust pipe. The top 1.6 THP175 16v 175 hp received a chrome plated dual exhaust pipe.

== Reception ==
The Peugeot 207 met with mixed reviews, facing criticism for the design of its interior, for the quality of its gearbox, and for its handling, with the latter two issues also identified in the GTI version.

Autocar magazine said the Peugeot 207 hatchback was "safely played and as such lacks charm, verve and difference". It did receive praise for its value, safety and styling. Reviewers feared that it would prove unreliable, and one car insurer named it the fourth least reliable vehicle. The CC version was better received, with Top Gear motoring magazine describing it as "a decent new version of one of the originals...of the tin top cabrio breed".

Despite this lack of acclaim, it has sold well in Britain, being the sixth best selling car overall (and third in the supermini sector) in 2007, with more than 67,000 examples being sold.

== Concept cars ==
=== 207 RCup ===
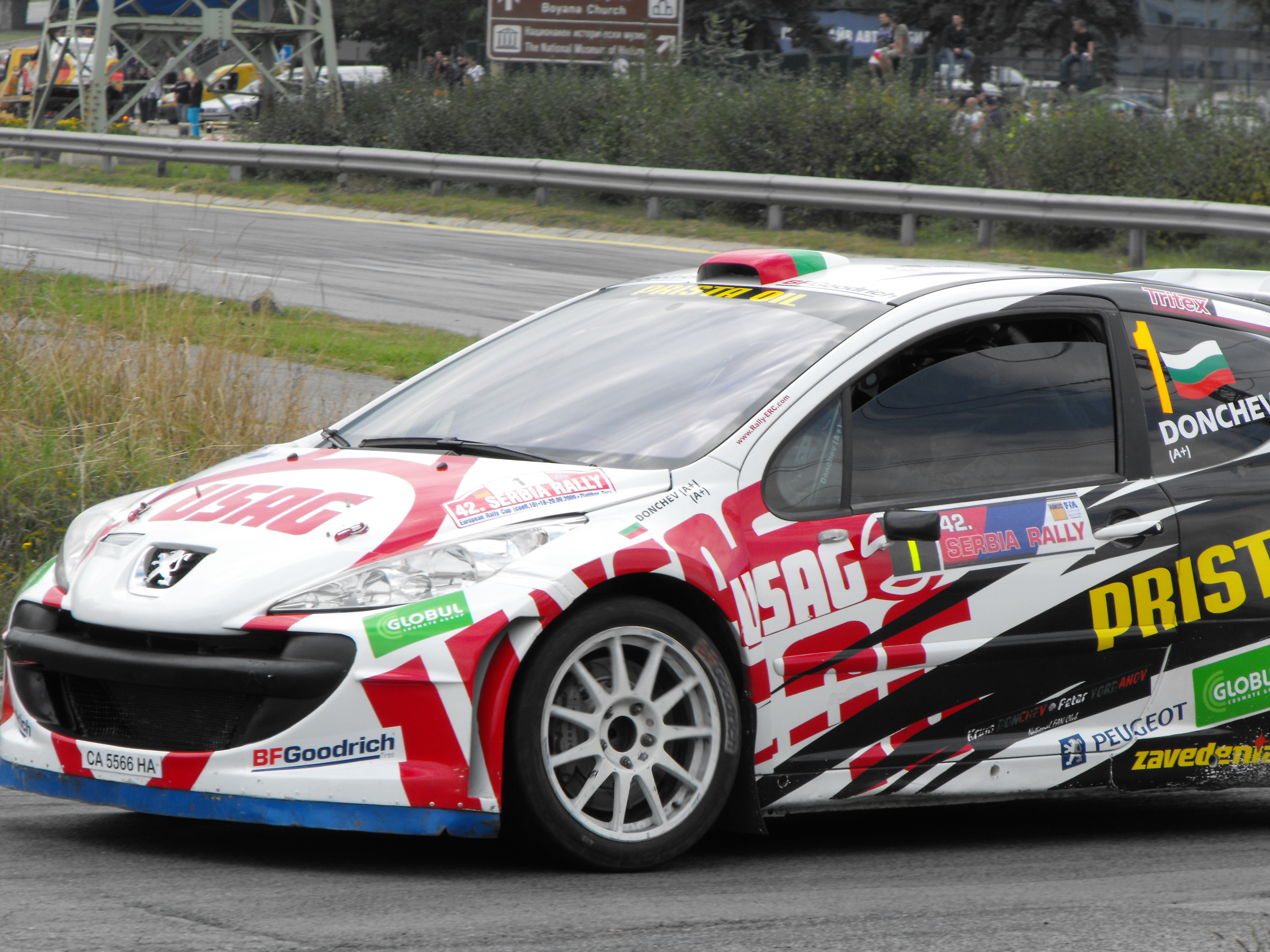
Prista Oil Peugeot 207 S2000 (2009)

At the 2006 Geneva Motor Show Peugeot also unveiled a sporty concept car based on the 207 and badged as the 207 RCup. This Super 2000 version is powered by a 2.0 litre petrol engine with maximum output of 280 hp (209 kW; 284 PS) and is intended as a successor for the 206 World Rally Car which was successfully used by Peugeot in the World Rally Championship, where it helped the team winning the manufacturers' championship in 2000, 2001 and 2002.

=== Peugeot 207 Epure ===
The Peugeot 207 Epure was a concept car presented at the Mondial de l'Automobile 2006 designed to preview the 207 CC which followed. The 207 Epure was fitted with a sophisticated hydrogen fuel cell.

== Peugeot 207 Super 2000 ==
2010 Peugeot 207 S2000

A Super 2000 version of the Peugeot 207 is used in the Super 2000 World Rally Championship as well as several rally championships across Europe. The 2008 European Rally drivers' champion and the 2007, 2008 and 2009 Intercontinental Rally Challenge drivers' champions drove 207 Super 2000s.

== Nameplate use ==
In several regions including China, South America, Southeast Asia and Iran, a facelifted Peugeot 206 version is marketed under the Peugeot 207 nameplate since November 2008. The model is based on the platform of the predecessor model, the Peugeot 206, and features the front end of the facelifted version 206+, which resembles the Peugeot 207. This name is used on 4-door, 5-door and even on SW model in Mercosur.

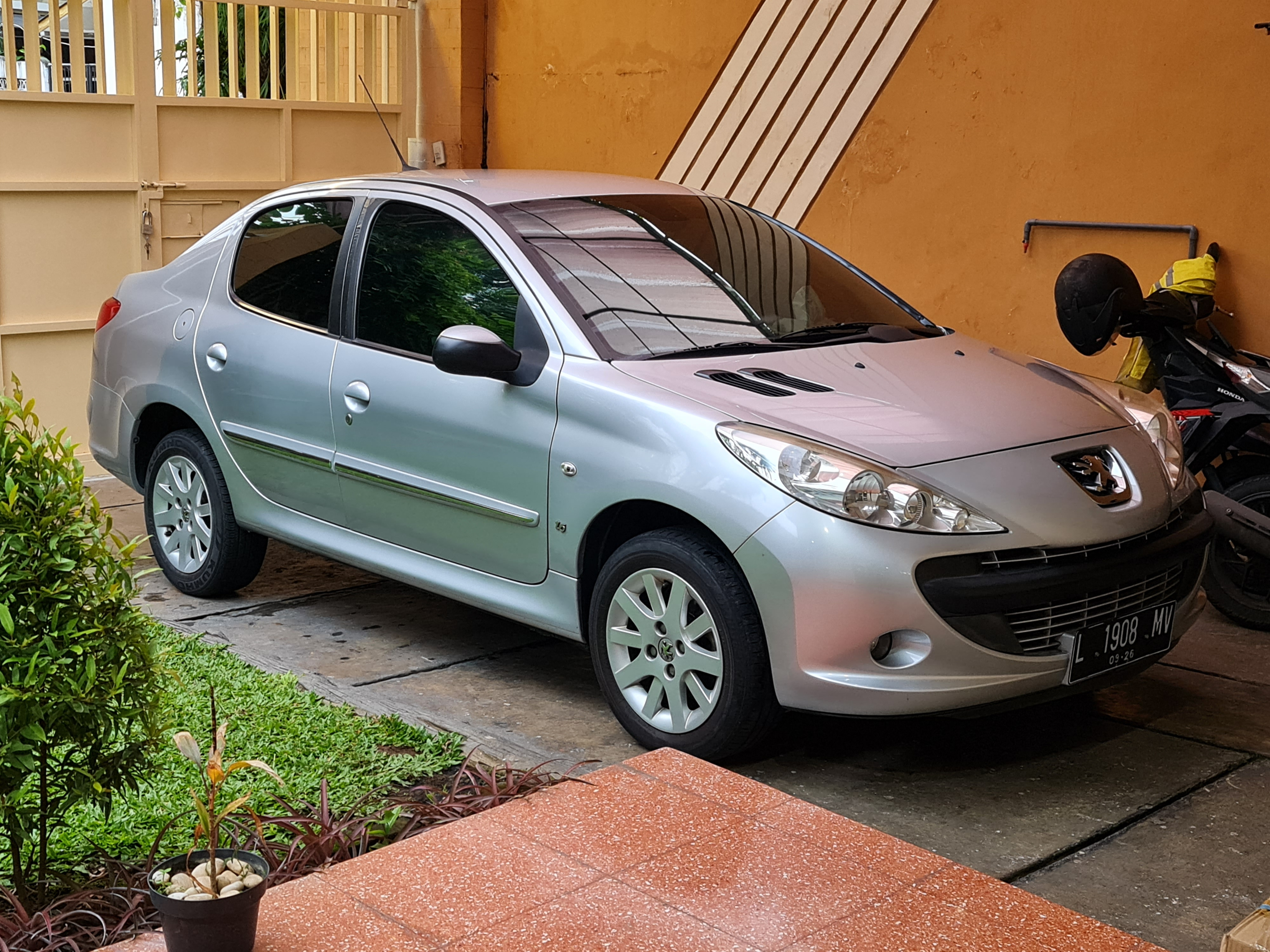
Peugeot 207 1.6 Sedan (Indonesia), based on the Peugeot 206 platform

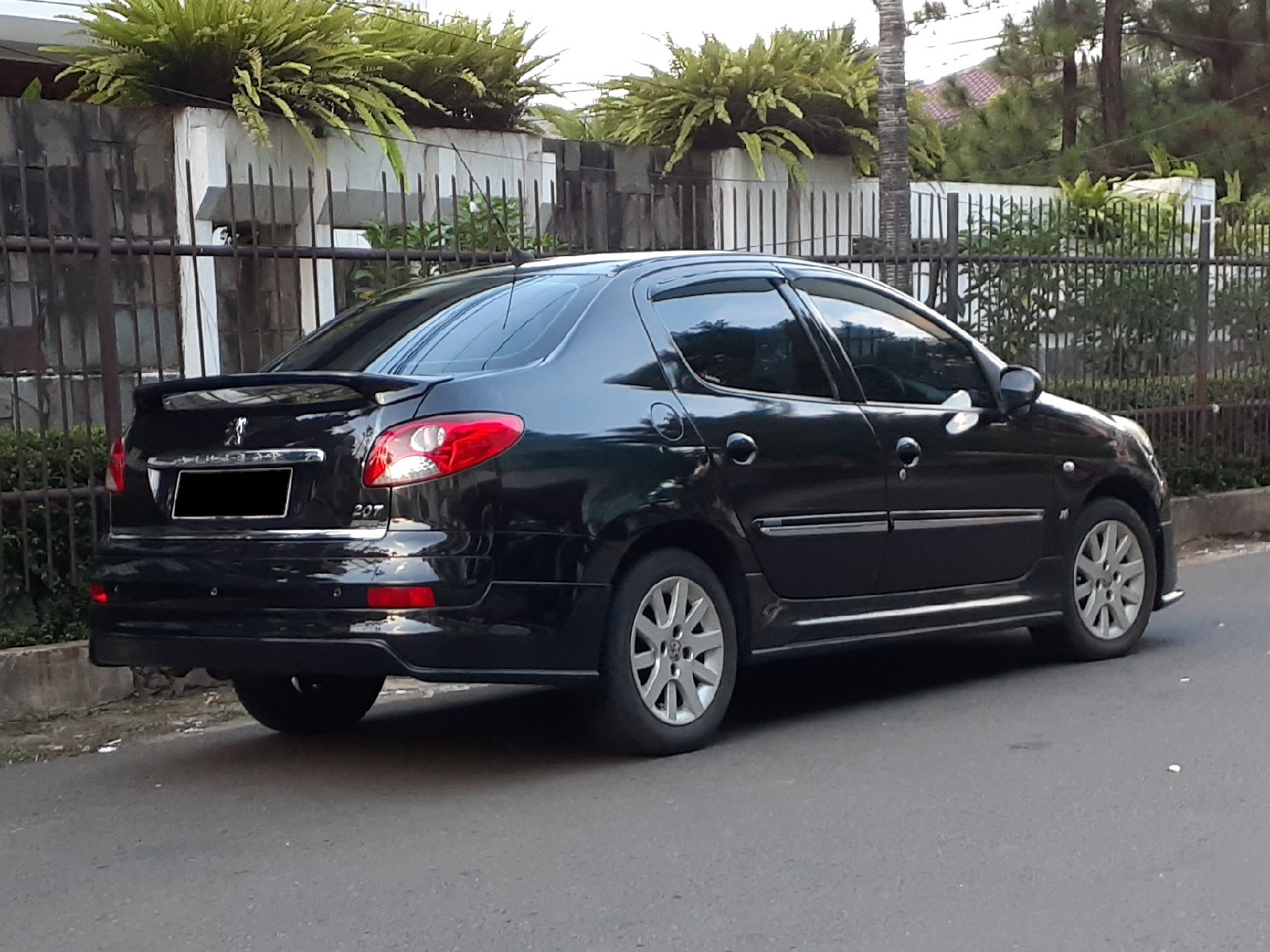
Peugeot 207 1.6 Sedan (Indonesia), based on the Peugeot 206 platform

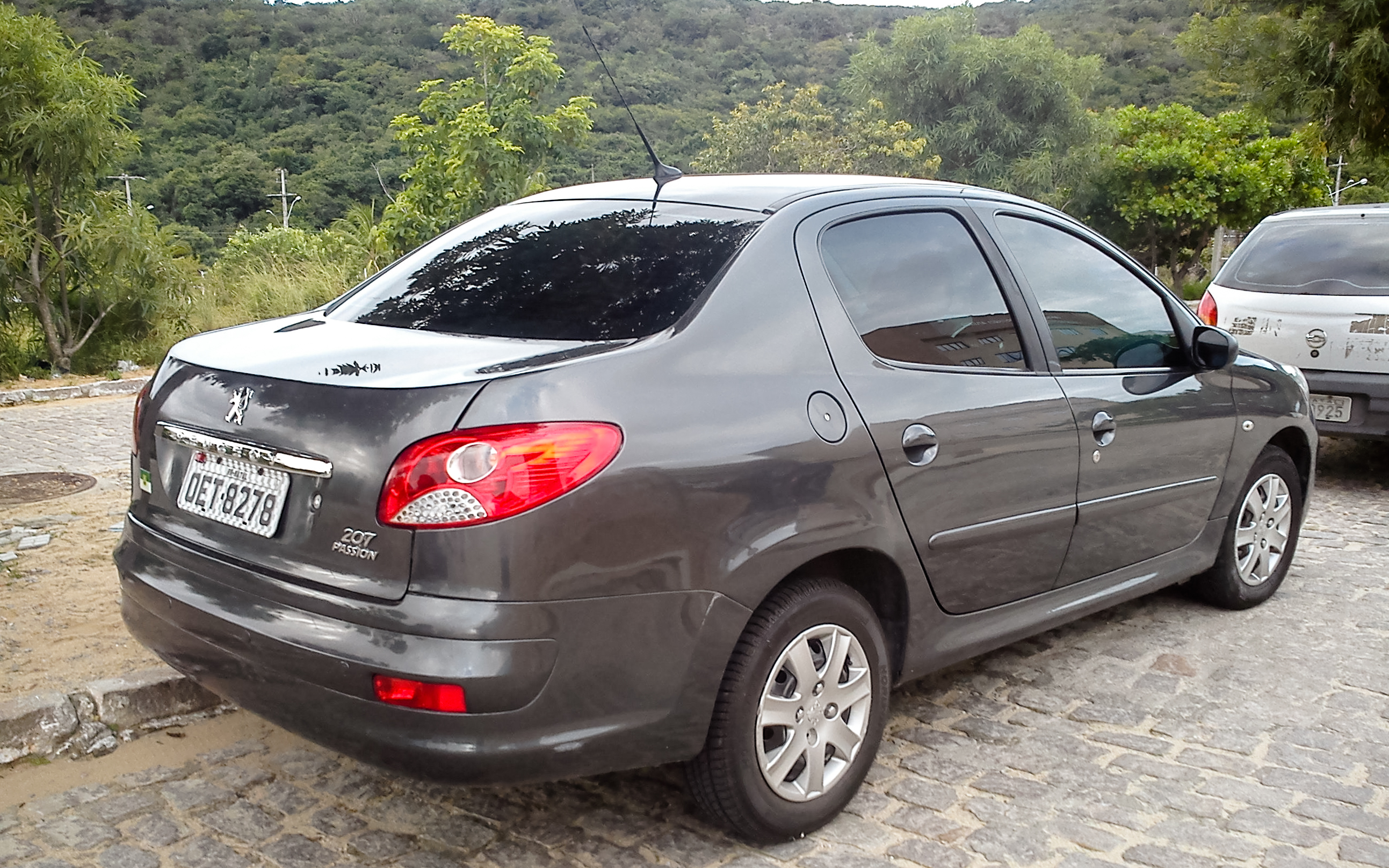
Peugeot 207 Passion sedan (South America)

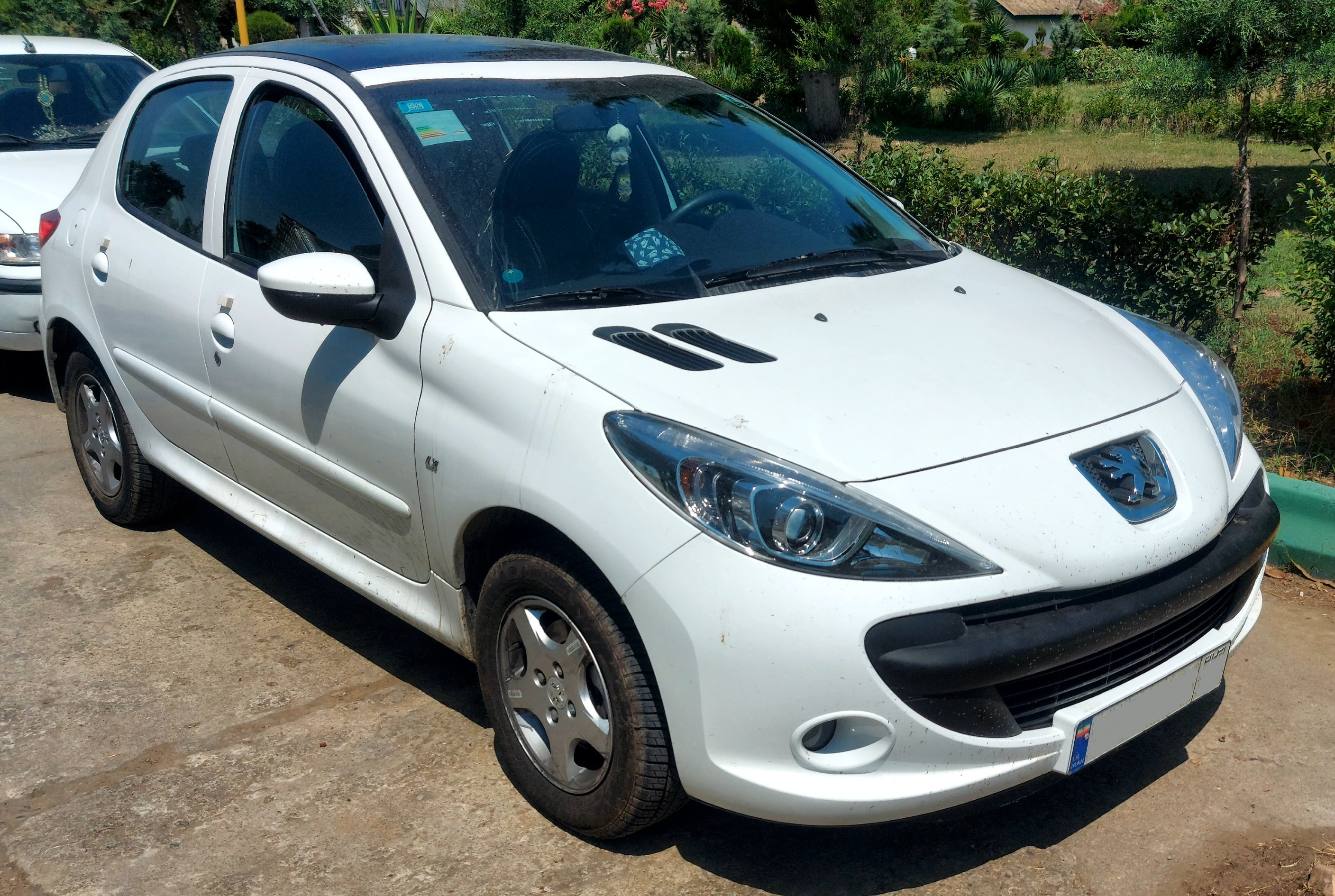
Peugeot 207i hatchback (Iran)

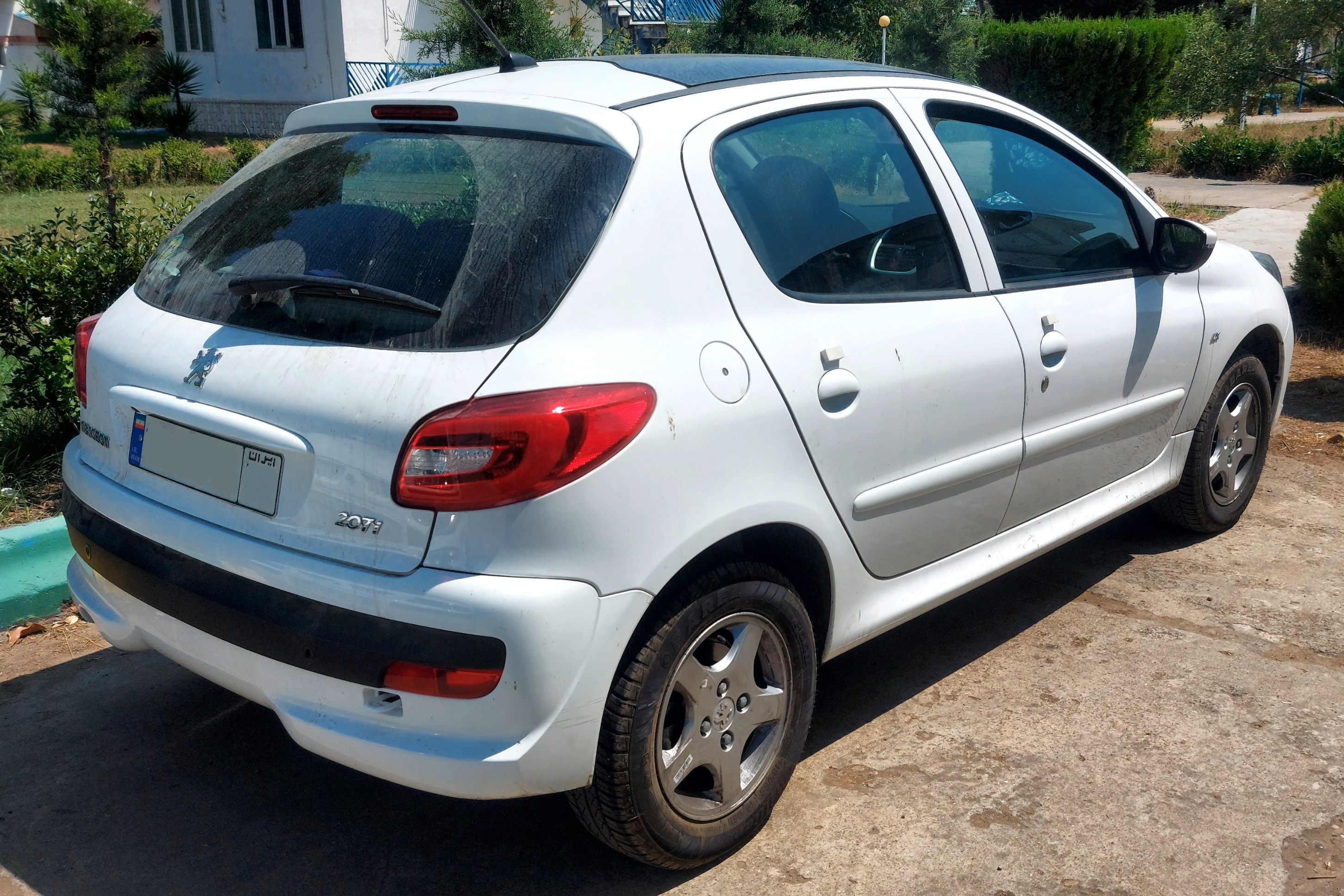
Peugeot 207i hatchback (Iran)

== Sales and production ==
Year	Worldwide production	Worldwide sales	Notes
2005	TBA	800	
2006	TBA	300,500	
2007	TBA	520,200	
2008	TBA	468,300	
2009	386,400	411,100	206 + introduced.
2010	344,900	353,100	
2011	293,836	296,665	Total production reaches 2,369,549 units.
2012	135,400	147,900	Total production reaches 2,504,900 units.

== Safety ==
ANCAP test results* Peugeot 207 4 door hatch with side and curtain airbags (2004)
Test	Score
Overall	5 /5 stars
Frontal offset	14.77/16
Side impact	14.82/16
Pole	2/2
Seat belt reminders	3/3
Whiplash protection	Not Assessed
Pedestrian protection	Adequate
Electronic stability control	Optional

ANCAP test results* Peugeot 207CC variant(s) as tested (2006)
Test	Score
Overall	5 /5 stars
Frontal offset	13.01/16
Side impact	16/16
Pole	2/2
Seat belt reminders	2/3
Whiplash protection	Not Assessed
Pedestrian protection	Adequate
Electronic stability control	Optional

== See also ==
- List of rally cars
- Peugeot 206
- Peugeot 208
