= NGC 207 =

Galaxy in the constellation Cetus

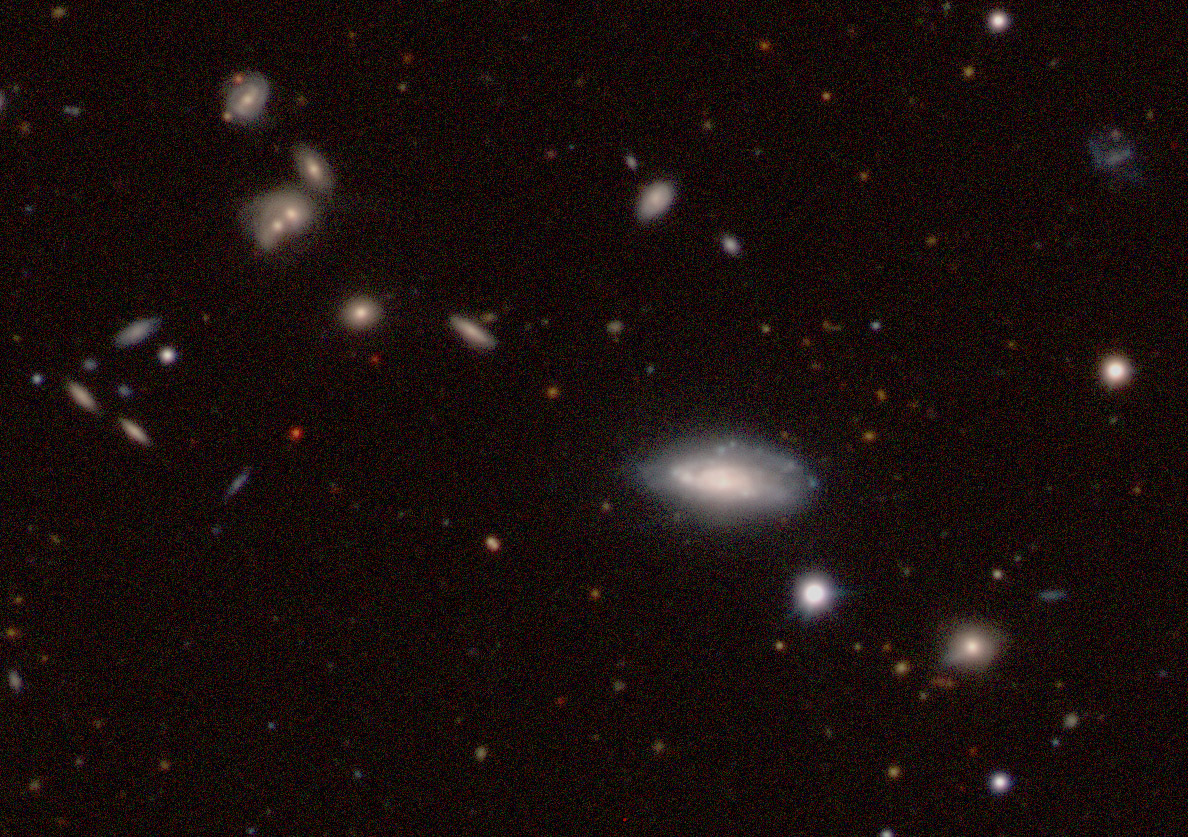
- NGC 207 and surrounding galaxies by DECam

Observation data (J2000 epoch)
- Constellation: Cetus
- Right ascension: 00^{h} 39^{m} 40.7^{s}
- Declination: −14° 14′ 13″
- Redshift: 0.013276
- Distance: 178 Mly
- Apparent magnitude (V): 14.59

Characteristics
- Type: Sc
- Apparent size (V): 0.6' × 0.3'

Other designations
- MCG -03-02-035, 2MASX J00394071-1414134, IRAS 00371+1430, F00371+1430, 6dF J0039407-141414, PGC 2395.

NGC 207 is a spiral galaxy about 178 million light-years from the Solar System in the constellation Cetus. It was discovered on December 7, 1857, by R. J. Mitchell.

== See also ==
- List of NGC objects (1–1000)
