= 207 series =

207 series may refer to:

- 207 series (JR West), a DC electric multiple unit (EMU) commuter train type operated by West Japan Railway Company
- 207 series (JR East), a former commuter train type introduced in 1986 by Japanese National Railways (JNR) and operated by East Japan Railway Company
