= 207th Aviation Regiment =

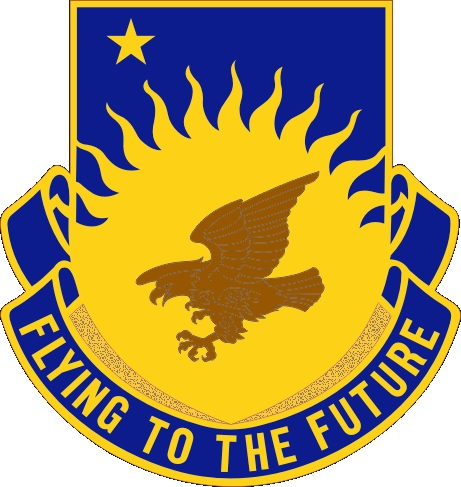
- 207th Aviation Regiment distinctive unit insignia
- Country: United States
- Branch: United States Army Aviation Branch

Aircraft flown
- Utility helicopter: UH-60L Black Hawk

The 207th Aviation Regiment is a regiment of the United States Army National Guard organized under the United States Army Regimental System.

Structure

- 1st Battalion (General Support), 207th Aviation Regiment (AK ARNG)(UH-60, C-12, CH-47, UH-72)
  - Company B
