= 207th =

207th may refer to:

== Military ==
- 207th (Ottawa-Carleton) Battalion, CEF, battalion of the First World War Canadian Expeditionary Force
- 207th Security Division, German border infantry unit during the invasion of Poland
- 207th Coast Artillery Anti-Aircraft Regiment, World War II US Army regiment
- 207th Pennsylvania Infantry Regiment, American Civil War (Union Army) regiment
- 207th Infantry Group (Scout), United States Army Alaska National Guard unit
- 207th (2nd East Midland) Brigade, a formation of the British Army during World War I

== Transport ==
- 207th Street station on the IRT Broadway – Seventh Avenue Line of the New York City Subway
- 207th Street Crosstown Line, a bus line in New York City serving the boroughs of Manhattan and The Bronx
- 207th Street Yard, rail yard of the New York City Subway system
- Inwood–207th Street station, the northern terminal station of the IND Eighth Avenue Line of the New York City Subway

== See also ==
- 207 (number)
- 207, the year 207 (CCVII) of the Julian calendar
