= 2012 Alaska Senate election =

- November 6, 2012

19 of 20 seats in the Alaska Senate 11 seats needed for a majority
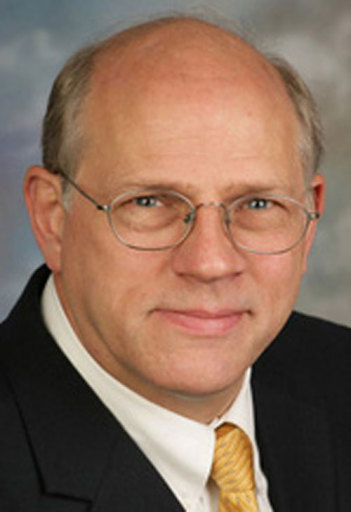

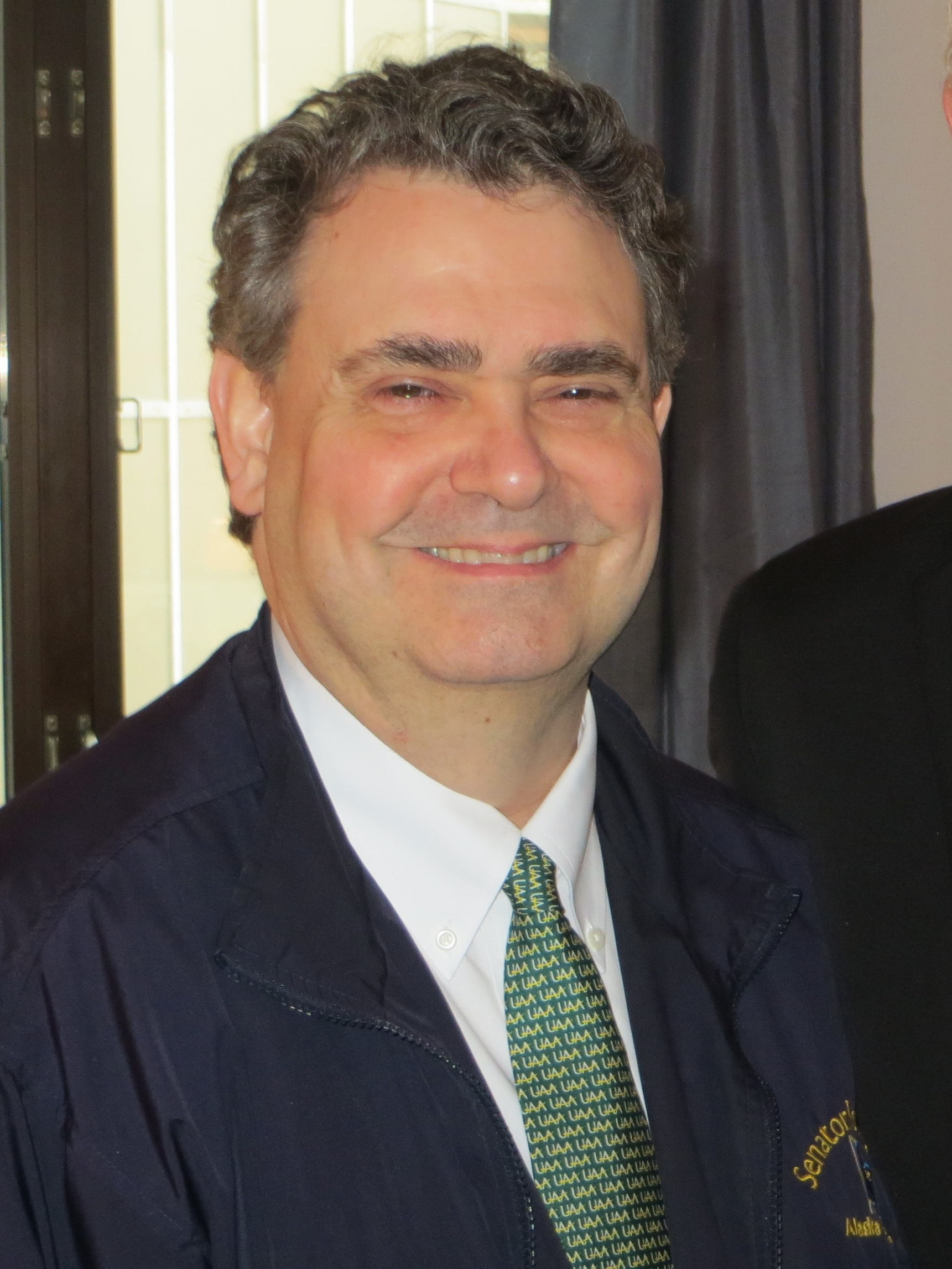
| | Majority party | Minority party |
|---|---|---|
| Leader | John Coghill | Johnny Ellis |
| Party | Republican | Democratic |
| Leader since | January 15, 2013 | January 15, 2013 |
| Leader's seat | District A (redistricted) | District I (redistricted) |
| Seats before | 10 | 10 |
| Seats after | 13 | 7 |
| Seat change | ▲3 | ▼3 |
| Popular vote | 151,568 | 88,868 |
| Percentage | 60.53 | 35.49 |
- Results: Democratic gain Republican gain Democratic hold Republican hold Note: the Democratic gain was through redistricting - no election took place in district P
President pro tempore before election
Gary Stevens
Republican
President pro tempore-designate
Charlie Huggins
Republican

The 2012 Alaska Senate elections were held on Tuesday, November 6, 2012, with the primary elections on August 28, 2012. 19 of the 20 districts of the Alaska Senate were up for election. Prior to the election, the Senate was evenly split between Democrats and Republicans, with 6 Republicans joining the Democrats in coalition. Following redistricting, the Republican Party gained 4 seats in the election to take control of the Senate, with the Democrats gaining a seat without an election through redistricting.

== Overview ==
2012 Alaska Senate elections General election — November 6, 2012
| Party | Votes | Percentage | Not up | Contested | Before | After | +/– |
|---|---|---|---|---|---|---|---|
| Republican | 151,568 | 60.53 | 0 | 18 | 10 | 13 | ▲3 |
| Democratic | 88,868 | 35.49 | 1 | 16 | 10 | 7 | ▼3 |
| Independent | 7,202 | 2.88 | 0 | 1 | 0 | 0 | Steady |
| Write-ins | 2,771 | 1.11 | 0 | 19 | 0 | 0 | Steady |

== Predictions ==
| Source | Ranking | As of |
|---|---|---|
| Governing | Lean R (flip) | October 24, 2012 |

== Results ==
=== District A ===
2012 Alaska Senate district A election
| Party | Candidate | Votes | % |
|---|---|---|---|
| Republican | John Coghill (incumbent) | 9,464 | 60.35 |
| Democratic | Joe Thomas (incumbent) | 6,175 | 39.38 |
| Write-ins | Write-ins | 43 | 0.27 |
| Total votes | | 15,682 | 100 |
| Republican gain from Democratic | | | |

=== District B ===
2012 Alaska Senate district B election
| Party | Candidate | Votes | % |
|---|---|---|---|
| Republican | Pete Kelly | 6,232 | 54.11 |
| Democratic | Joe Paskvan (incumbent) | 5,249 | 45.58 |
| Write-ins | Write-ins | 36 | 0.31 |
| Total votes | | 11,517 | 100 |
| Republican gain from Democratic | | | |

=== District C ===
2012 Alaska Senate district C election
| Party | Candidate | Votes | % |
|---|---|---|---|
| Republican | Click Bishop | 10,051 | 70.40 |
| Democratic | Anne Sudkamp | 4,074 | 28.54 |
| Write-ins | Write-ins | 152 | 1.06 |
| Total votes | | 14,277 | 100 |
| Republican hold | | | |

=== District D ===
2012 Alaska Senate district D election
| Party | Candidate | Votes | % |
|---|---|---|---|
| Republican | Mike Dunleavy | 11,724 | 94.24 |
| Write-ins | Write-ins | 716 | 5.76 |
| Total votes | | 12,440 | 100 |
| Republican hold | | | |

=== District E ===
2012 Alaska Senate district E election
| Party | Candidate | Votes | % |
|---|---|---|---|
| Republican | Charlie Huggins (incumbent) | 9,828 | 77.65 |
| Democratic | Susan Herman | 2,790 | 22.04 |
| Write-ins | Write-ins | 39 | 0.31 |
| Total votes | | 12,657 | 100 |
| Republican hold | | | |

=== District F ===
2012 Alaska Senate district F election
| Party | Candidate | Votes | % |
|---|---|---|---|
| Republican | Fred Dyson (incumbent) | 9,954 | 75.15 |
| Democratic | Martin Lindeke | 3,238 | 24.45 |
| Write-ins | Write-ins | 53 | 0.40 |
| Total votes | | 13,245 | 100 |
| Republican hold | | | |

=== District G ===
2012 Alaska Senate district G election
| Party | Candidate | Votes | % |
|---|---|---|---|
| Democratic | Bill Wielechowski (incumbent) | 6,378 | 56.02 |
| Republican | Bob Roses | 4,977 | 43.72 |
| Write-ins | Write-ins | 30 | 0.26 |
| Total votes | | 11,385 | 100 |
| Democratic hold | | | |

=== District H ===
2012 Alaska Senate district H election
| Party | Candidate | Votes | % |
|---|---|---|---|
| Democratic | Berta Gardner | 6,950 | 59.23 |
| Republican | Don Smith | 4,730 | 40.31 |
| Write-ins | Write-ins | 54 | 0.46 |
| Total votes | | 11,734 | 100 |
| Democratic hold | | | |

=== District I ===
2012 Alaska Senate district I election
| Party | Candidate | Votes | % |
|---|---|---|---|
| Democratic | Johnny Ellis (incumbent) | 6,818 | 67.87 |
| Republican | Paul Kendall | 3,190 | 31.75 |
| Write-ins | Write-ins | 38 | 0.38 |
| Total votes | | 10,046 | 100 |
| Democratic hold | | | |

=== District J ===
2012 Alaska Senate district J election
| Party | Candidate | Votes | % |
|---|---|---|---|
| Democratic | Hollis French (incumbent) | 7,593 | 50.01 |
| Republican | Bob Bell | 7,542 | 49.68 |
| Write-ins | Write-ins | 47 | 0.31 |
| Total votes | | 15,182 | 100 |
| Democratic hold | | | |

=== District K ===
2012 Alaska Senate district K election
| Party | Candidate | Votes | % |
|---|---|---|---|
| Republican | Lesil McGuire (incumbent) | 9,291 | 66.02 |
| Democratic | Roselynn Cacy | 4,694 | 33.35 |
| Write-ins | Write-ins | 88 | 0.63 |
| Total votes | | 14,073 | 100 |
| Republican hold | | | |

=== District L ===
2012 Alaska Senate district L election
| Party | Candidate | Votes | % |
|---|---|---|---|
| Republican | Kevin Meyer (incumbent) | 10,304 | 72.41 |
| Democratic | Jacob Hale | 3,894 | 27.36 |
| Write-ins | Write-ins | 32 | 0.22 |
| Total votes | | 14,230 | 100 |
| Republican hold | | | |

=== District M ===
2012 Alaska Senate district M election
| Party | Candidate | Votes | % |
|---|---|---|---|
| Republican | Anna Fairclough | 11,012 | 62.12 |
| Democratic | Bettye Davis (incumbent) | 6,676 | 37.66 |
| Write-ins | Write-ins | 38 | 0.21 |
| Total votes | | 17,726 | 100 |
| Republican gain from Democratic | | | |

=== District N ===
2012 Alaska Senate district N election
| Party | Candidate | Votes | % |
|---|---|---|---|
| Republican | Cathy Giessel (incumbent) | 10,405 | 58.80 |
| Independent | Ron Devon | 7,202 | 40.70 |
| Write-ins | Write-ins | 88 | 0.50 |
| Total votes | | 17,695 | 100 |
| Republican hold | | | |

=== District O ===
2012 Alaska Senate district O election
| Party | Candidate | Votes | % |
|---|---|---|---|
| Republican | Peter Micciche | 12,947 | 94.61 |
| Write-ins | Write-ins | 738 | 5.39 |
| Total votes | | 13,685 | 100 |
| Republican hold | | | |

=== District Q ===
2012 Alaska Senate district Q election
| Party | Candidate | Votes | % |
|---|---|---|---|
| Republican | Bert Stedman (incumbent) | 9,829 | 64.30 |
| Democratic | Albert Kookesh (incumbent) | 5,413 | 35.41 |
| Write-ins | Write-ins | 44 | 0.29 |
| Total votes | | 15,286 | 100 |
| Republican gain from Democratic | | | |

=== District R ===
2012 Alaska Senate district R election
| Party | Candidate | Votes | % |
|---|---|---|---|
| Republican | Gary Stevens (incumbent) | 7,673 | 69.76 |
| Democratic | Robert Henrichs | 3,277 | 29.79 |
| Write-ins | Write-ins | 49 | 0.45 |
| Total votes | | 10,999 | 100 |
| Republican hold | | | |

=== District S ===
2012 Alaska Senate district S election
| Party | Candidate | Votes | % |
|---|---|---|---|
| Democratic | Lyman Hoffman (incumbent) | 8,194 | 95.07 |
| Write-ins | Write-ins | 425 | 4.93 |
| Total votes | | 8,619 | 100 |
| Democratic hold | | | |

=== District T ===
2012 Alaska Senate district T election
| Party | Candidate | Votes | % |
|---|---|---|---|
| Democratic | Donny Olson (incumbent) | 7,455 | 75.07 |
| Republican | Allen Minish | 2,415 | 24.32 |
| Write-ins | Write-ins | 61 | 0.61 |
| Total votes | | 9,931 | 100 |
| Democratic hold | | | |
