= 2022 Alaska Senate election =

2022 Alaska Senate elections
- November 8, 2022

19 of 20 seats in the Alaska Senate 11 seats needed for a majority
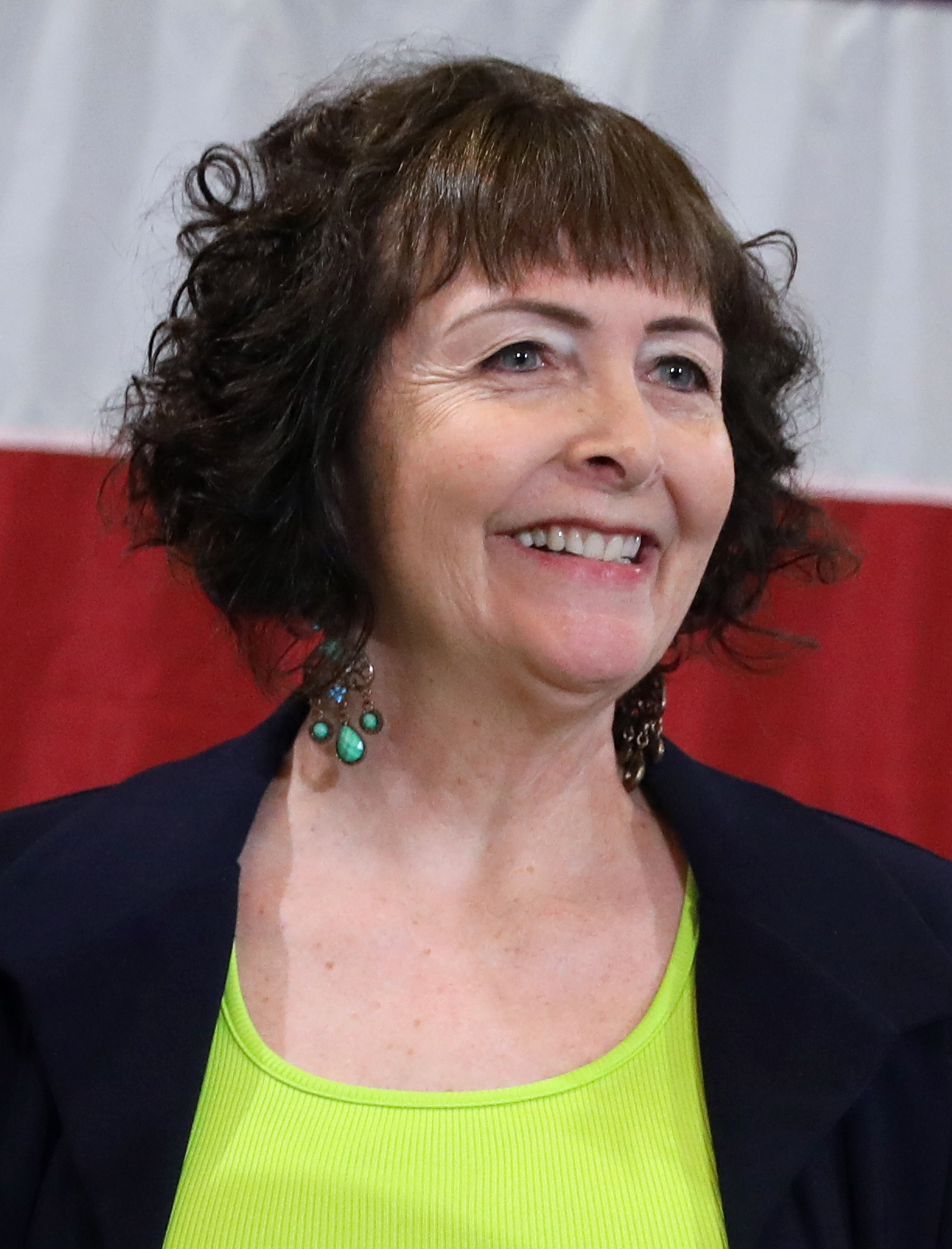

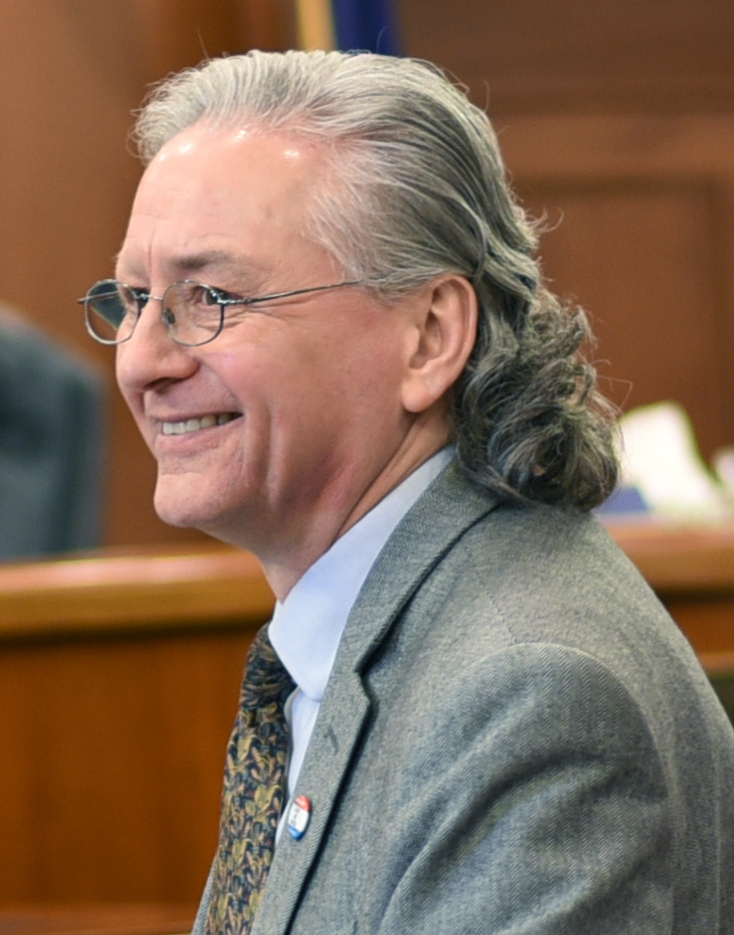
	Majority party	Minority party
Leader	Shelley Hughes	Tom Begich (retired)
Party	Republican	Democratic
Leader since	January 19, 2021	January 15, 2019
Leader's seat	M (Note: Redistricted from District F)–Palmer	J–Anchorage
Last election	8 seats, 57.84%	3 seats, 21.84%
Seats before	13	7
Seats won	11	8
Seats after	11	9
Seat change	▼2	▲2
Popular vote	153,603	66,358
Percentage	63.76%	27.55%
- Results: Republican hold Democratic hold Democratic gain
Senate President before election
Peter Micciche
Republican
Elected Senate President
Gary Stevens
Republican (Coalition)

The 2022 Alaska Senate elections took place on November 8, 2022, with the primary elections being held on August 16, 2022. State senators serve four-year terms in the Alaska Senate, with half of the seats normally up for election every two years. However, because most districts were greatly changed in redistricting, elections were held for 19 of the 20 seats; the only exception is District T, represented by Democrat Donny Olson, which was mostly unchanged in redistricting and thus did not have an election. Some senators were elected to serve four-year terms, while others would serve shortened two-year terms.

Following the previous election in 2020, Republicans had control of the Alaska Senate, with 13 seats to Democrats' seven seats. One Democrat caucused with the Republicans, giving them a governing majority of 14 seats.

After the 2022 elections, Republicans lost two seats to Democrats, reducing their majority to 11–9. However, a coalition government was formed with eight Republicans and all nine Democrats.

== Background ==
In 2020, Alaskan voters approved Ballot Measure 2, an initiative to implement a nonpartisan blanket top-four primary with a single, open primary where candidates from all parties are listed on the ballot and the top four vote getters advance to the general election. The general election is then resolved using instant-runoff voting, where voters rank the candidates and the candidates receiving the lowest votes are eliminated one by one until one candidate has a majority. The first election using the new system was the 2022 election cycle. As of the close of candidate filing, none of the elections for the Alaska Senate had more than four candidates.

== Predictions ==
Source	Ranking	As of
Sabato's Crystal Ball	Likely R	May 19, 2022

== Overview ==
=== Primary elections ===
2022 Alaska State Senate election Primary election – August 16, 2022
Party	Votes	%	Candidates	Advancing to general	Seats contesting
Republican	105,695	65.01	29	29	16
Democratic	47,461	29.19	13	13	11
Independent	5,869	3.61	3	3	3
Alaska Independence	2,344	1.44	2	2	2
Veterans of Alaska	1,217	0.75	1	1	1
Totals	162,586	100.00	48	48	—

Two Republicans and one Democrat withdrew before the general election.

=== General election ===
2022 Alaska Senate election General election — November 8, 2022
Party	Votes	%	Seats not up	Seats up	Candidates	Before	After	±
Republican	154,004	64.75	0	13	27	13	11	▼2
Democratic	68,181	28.67	1	6	12	7	9	▲2
Independent	8,205	3.45	—	—	3	0	0	Steady
Alaska Independence	3,049	1.28	—	—	2	0	0	Steady
Veterans of Alaska	2,378	1.00	—	—	1	0	0	Steady
Write-ins	2,031	0.85	—	—	—	0	0	Steady
Total	237,848	100.00	1	19	45	20	20	Steady

== Summary of results ==
District	Incumbent	Party	Elected Senator	Party
A	Bert Stedman	Rep	Bert Stedman	Rep
B	Jesse Kiehl	Dem	Jesse Kiehl	Dem
C	Gary Stevens	Rep	Gary Stevens	Rep
D	Peter Micciche	Rep	Jesse Bjorkman	Rep
E	Roger Holland	Rep	Cathy Giessel	Rep
F	Josh Revak	Rep	James D. Kaufman	Rep
G	Elvi Gray-Jackson	Dem	Elvi Gray-Jackson	Dem
H	Mia Costello	Rep	Matt Claman	Dem
H	Natasha von Imhof	Rep	Matt Claman	Dem
I	Vacant		Löki Tobin	Dem
J	Tom Begich	Dem	Forrest Dunbar	Dem
K	Bill Wielechowski	Dem	Bill Wielechowski	Dem
L	Lora Reinbold		Kelly Merrick	Rep
M	Shelley Hughes	Rep	Shelley Hughes	Rep
N	David Wilson	Rep	David Wilson	Rep
O	Mike Shower	Rep	Mike Shower	Rep
P	Scott Kawasaki	Dem	Scott Kawasaki	Dem
Q	Robert Myers Jr.	Rep	Robert Myers Jr.	Rep
R	Click Bishop	Rep	Click Bishop	Rep
S	Lyman Hoffman	Dem (Note: Sen. Hoffman had caucused with the Republican majority since 2015.)	Lyman Hoffman	Dem

== Retiring incumbents ==
- E District: Lora Reinbold (R)
- F District: Josh Revak (R) (ran for U.S. House)
- H District: Natasha von Imhof (R)
- J District: Tom Begich (D)

== Detailed results ==
- Source for primary results
- Source for general election results

=== District A ===
Nonpartisan primary
Party	Candidate	Votes	%
Republican	Bert Stedman (incumbent)	5,537	68.9
Republican	Mike Sheldon	2,505	31.1
Total votes		8,042	100.00

General election
Party	Candidate	Votes	%
Republican	Bert Stedman (incumbent)	8,902	68.8
Republican	Mike Sheldon	3,941	30.5
Write-in	Write-ins	98	0.8
Total votes		12,941	100.0
Republican hold			

=== District B ===
Nonpartisan primary
Party	Candidate	Votes	%
Democratic	Jesse Kiehl (incumbent)	8,921	100.0
Total votes		8,921	100.0

General election
Party	Candidate	Votes	%
Democratic	Jesse Kiehl (incumbent)	12,724	95.8
Write-in	Write-ins	554	4.2
Total votes		13,278	100.0
Democratic hold			

=== District C ===
Nonpartisan primary
Party	Candidate	Votes	%
Republican	Gary Stevens (incumbent)	6,208	63.2
Republican	Heath Smith	2,634	26.8
Republican	Walter Jones	984	10.0
Total votes		9,826	100.00

General election
Party	Candidate	Votes	%
Republican	Gary Stevens (incumbent)	7,867	56.3
Republican	Heath Smith	4,353	31.1
Republican	Walter Jones	1,623	11.6
Write-in	Write-ins	132	0.9
Total votes		13,975	100.0
Republican hold			

=== District D ===
Nonpartisan primary
Party	Candidate	Votes	%
Republican	Tuckerman Babcock	5,157	49.3
Republican	Jesse Bjorkman	3,754	35.9
Independent	Andy Cizek	1,543	14.8
Total votes		10,454	100.00

General election
Party	Candidate	First choice			Round 1			Round 2	
Party	Candidate	Votes	%	Transfer	Votes	%	Transfer	Votes	%
Republican	Jesse Bjorkman	6,950	45.8	+122	7,072	46.6	+532	7,604	53.6
Republican	Tuckerman Babcock	6,311	41.6	+20	6,331	41.7	+263	6,594	46.4
Independent	Andy Cizek	1,768	11.7	+19	1,787	11.8	-1,787	Eliminated	
Write-in		140	0.9	-140	Eliminated				
Total votes		15,169			15,190			14,198	
Blank or inactive ballots					1,046		+992	2,038	
Republican hold									

=== District E ===
Nonpartisan primary
Party	Candidate	Votes	%
Republican	Cathy Giessel	4,441	35.6
Democratic	Roselynn Cacy	4,195	33.7
Republican	Roger Holland (incumbent)	3,823	30.7
Total votes		12,459	100.00

General election
Party	Candidate	First choice			Round 1			Round 2	
Party	Candidate	Votes	%	Transfer	Votes	%	Transfer	Votes	%
Republican	Cathy Giessel	5,611	33.6	+41	5,652	33.8	+2,229	7,881	57.0
Republican	Roger Holland (incumbent)	5,521	33.1	+11	5,532	33.1	+417	5,949	43.0
Democratic	Roselynn Cacy	5,490	32.9	+28	5,518	33.0	-5,518	Eliminated	
Write-in		58	0.4	-58	Eliminated				
Total votes		16,680			16,702			13,830	
Blank or inactive ballots					735		+2,872	3,607	
Republican hold									

=== District F ===
Nonpartisan primary
Party	Candidate	Votes	%
Republican	James D. Kaufman	5,453	54.2
Democratic	Janice Park	4,612	45.8
Total votes		10,065	100.00

General election
Party	Candidate	Votes	%
Republican	James D. Kaufman	7,795	54.5
Democratic	Janice Park	6,476	45.3
Write-in	Write-ins	29	0.2
Total votes		14,300	100.0
Republican hold			

=== District G ===
Nonpartisan primary
Party	Candidate	Votes	%
Democratic	Elvi Gray-Jackson (incumbent)	4,552	57.5
Republican	Marcus Sanders	3,365	42.5
Total votes		7,917	100.0

General election
Party	Candidate	Votes	%
Democratic	Elvi Gray-Jackson (incumbent)	6,325	56.5
Republican	Marcus Sanders	4,832	43.1
Write-in	Write-ins	42	0.4
Total votes		11,199	100.0
Democratic hold			

=== District H ===
Nonpartisan primary
Party	Candidate	Votes	%
Democratic	Matt Claman	6,022	52.6
Republican	Mia Costello (incumbent)	5,424	47.4
Total votes		11,446	100.00

General election
Party	Candidate	Votes	%
Democratic	Matt Claman	7,868	51.8
Republican	Mia Costello (incumbent)	7,271	47.9
Write-in	Write-ins	51	0.3
Total votes		15,190	100.0
Democratic gain from Republican			

=== District I ===
Nonpartisan primary
Party	Candidate	Votes	%
Democratic	Löki Tobin	3,435	68.0
Independent	Heather Herndon	1,615	32.0
Total votes		5,050	100.0

General election
Party	Candidate	Votes	%
Democratic	Löki Tobin	5,011	66.4
Independent	Heather Herndon	2,428	32.2
Write-in	Write-ins	105	1.4
Total votes		7,544	100.0
Democratic hold			

=== District J ===
Nonpartisan primary
Party	Candidate	Votes	%
Democratic	Forrest Dunbar	2,947	49.4
Republican	Andrew Satterfield	1,904	31.9
Democratic	Geran Tarr	916	15.3
Democratic	Drew Cason (withdrew)	201	3.4
Total votes		5,968	100.00

General election
Party	Candidate	Votes	%
Democratic	Forrest Dunbar	4,306	50.0
Republican	Andrew Satterfield	2,813	32.7
Democratic	Geran Tarr	1,443	16.8
Write in	Write-ins	45	0.5
Total votes		8,607	100.00
Democratic gain from Republican			

=== District K ===
Nonpartisan primary
Party	Candidate	Votes	%
Democratic	Bill Wielechowski (incumbent)	4,131	56.6
Republican	John Cunningham	3,171	43.4
Total votes		7,302	100.00

General election
Party	Candidate	Votes	%
Democratic	Bill Wielechowski (incumbent)	6,267	58.0
Republican	John Cunningham	4,504	41.7
Write-in	Write-ins	35	0.3
Total votes		10,806	100.0
Democratic hold			

=== District L ===
Nonpartisan primary
Party	Candidate	Votes	%
Republican	Kelly Merrick	5,324	53.1
Republican	Ken McCarty	2,872	28.7
Republican	Joe Wright	1,132	11.3
Republican	Clayton Trotter	691	6.9
Total votes		10,019	100.00

Republicans Joe Wright and Clayton Trotter withdrew prior to the general election.

General election
Party	Candidate	Votes	%
Republican	Kelly Merrick	8,497	57.9
Republican	Ken McCarty	6,024	41.0
Write-in	Write-ins	156	1.1
Total votes		14,677	100.0
Republican hold			

=== District M ===
Nonpartisan primary
Party	Candidate	Votes	%
Republican	Shelley Hughes (incumbent)	7,707	75.7
Democratic	Jim Cooper	2,479	24.3
Total votes		10,186	100.00

General election
Party	Candidate	Votes	%
Republican	Shelley Hughes (incumbent)	11,257	75.8
Democratic	Jim Cooper	3,561	24.0
Write-in	Write-ins	32	0.2
Total votes		14,850	100.0
Republican hold			

=== District N ===
Nonpartisan primary
Party	Candidate	Votes	%
Republican	David Wilson (incumbent)	3,585	46.4
Republican	Steven Wright	2,123	27.5
Republican	Scott Clayton	2,025	26.2
Total votes		7,733	100.00

General election
Party	Candidate	First choice			Round 1			Round 2	
Party	Candidate	Votes	%	Transfer	Votes	%	Transfer	Votes	%
Republican	David Wilson (incumbent)	5,133	44.5	+37	5,170	44.8	+954	6,124	58.7
Republican	Steven Wright	3,347	29.0	+38	3,385	29.4	+926	4,311	41.3
Republican	Scott Clayton	2,923	25.3	+54	2,977	25.8	-2,977	Eliminated	
Write-in		141	1.2	-141	Eliminated				
Total votes		11,544			11,532			10,435	
Blank or inactive ballots					2,244		+1,097	3,341	
Republican hold									

=== District O ===
Nonpartisan primary
Party	Candidate	Votes	%
Republican	Doug Massie	5,007	53.9
Republican	Mike Shower (incumbent)	4,288	46.1
Total votes		9,295	100.00

General election
Party	Candidate	Votes	%
Republican	Mike Shower (incumbent)	7,396	51.8
Republican	Doug Massie	6,712	47.0
Write-in	Write-ins	169	1.2
Total votes		14,277	100.0
Republican hold			

=== District P ===
Nonpartisan primary
Party	Candidate	Votes	%
Democratic	Scott Kawasaki (incumbent)	2,664	48.8
Republican	Jim Matherly	2,426	44.4
Republican	Alex Jafre	370	6.8
Total votes		5,460	100.00

General election
Party	Candidate	Votes	%
Democratic	Scott Kawasaki (incumbent)	4,274	51.1
Republican	Jim Matherly	3,509	42.0
Republican	Alex Jafre	539	6.4
Write in	Write-ins	35	0.4
Total votes		8,357	100.00
Democratic hold			

=== District Q ===
Nonpartisan primary
Party	Candidate	Votes	%
Republican	Robert Myers Jr. (incumbent)	5,506	62.9
Independent	John Bennett	2,711	31.0
Independence	Arthur Serkov	539	6.2
Total votes		8,756	100.00

General election
Party	Candidate	Votes	%
Republican	Robert Myers Jr. (incumbent)	8,119	62.6
Independent	John Bennett	4,009	30.9
Independence	Arthur Serkov	774	6.0
Write-in	Write-ins	74	0.6
Total votes		12,976	100.0
Republican hold			

=== District R ===
Nonpartisan primary
Party	Candidate	Votes	%
Republican	Click Bishop (incumbent)	5,736	56.9
Republican	Elijah Verhagen	2,543	25.2
Independence	Bert Williams	1,805	17.9
Total votes		10,084	100.00

General election
Party	Candidate	Votes	%
Republican	Click Bishop (incumbent)	8,297	56.7
Republican	Elijah Verhagen	3,957	27.1
Independence	Bert Williams	2,275	15.6
Write-in	Write-ins	95	0.6
Total votes		14,624	100.0
Republican hold			

=== District S ===
Nonpartisan primary
Party	Candidate	Votes	%
Democratic	Lyman Hoffman (incumbent)	2,386	66.2
Veterans of Alaska	Willy Keppel	1,217	33.8
Total votes		3,603	100.00

General election
Party	Candidate	Votes	%
Democratic	Lyman Hoffman (incumbent)	4,436	64.7
Veterans of Alaska	Willy Keppel	2,378	34.7
Write-in	Write-ins	40	0.6
Total votes		6,854	100.0
Democratic hold			

== Aftermath ==
Negotiations for a governing coalition in the state senate occurred after ranked-choice votes in the state were tabulated. The bipartisan coalition was announced two days later on November 25, with eight Republicans and nine Democrats leading the new Senate majority. They stated that their top priorities would be energy costs, education, and the economy. Incoming Senate President Gary Stevens also remarked that the bipartisan coalition was necessary to pass responsible budgets and respond to calls for "more moderation" by the electorate.

== See also ==
- 2022 United States Senate election in Alaska
- 2022 United States House of Representatives elections in Alaska
- 2022 United States gubernatorial elections
- 2022 United States state legislative elections
- 2022 Alaska House of Representatives election
- 2022 Alaska elections
- List of Alaska State Legislatures
