= 2020 Alaska Senate election =

- November 3, 2020

11 of 20 seats in the Alaska Senate 11 seats needed for a majority
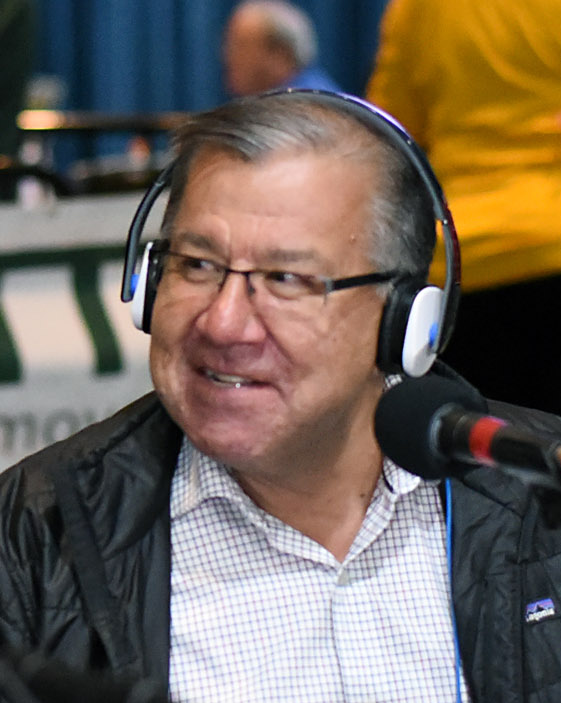

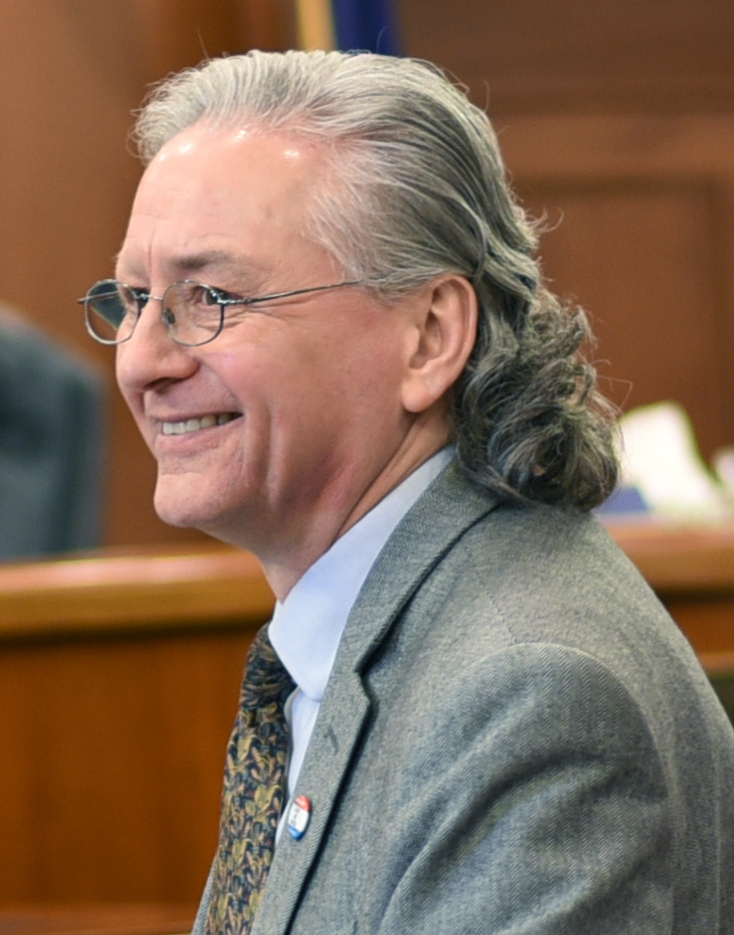

	Majority party	Minority party	Third party
Leader	Lyman Hoffman (Note: Hoffman, who was not up for reelection in 2020, is a Democrat who caucused with the Republican majority.)	Tom Begich	—
Party	Republican	Democratic	Independent
Leader since	July 9, 2019	January 15, 2019	—
Leader's seat	S–Bethel	J–Anchorage	—
Last election	7 seats, 50.12%	4 seats, 39.78%	0 seats, 5.22%
Seats before	13	7	0
Seats won	8	3	0
Seats after	13	7	0
Seat change	Steady	Steady	Steady
Popular vote	104,467	39,447	26,286
Percentage	57.84%	21.84%	14.55%
Swing	▲7.72%	▼17.94%	▲9.33%
- Results: Democratic hold Republican hold No election
Senate President before election
Cathy Giessel
Republican
Elected Senate President
Peter Micciche
Republican

The 2020 Alaska Senate elections took place as part of the biennial 2020 United States elections. Voters in Alaska elected state senators in 11 of the state's 20 senate districts – the usual ten plus one special election. State senators serve four-year terms in the Alaska Senate, with half seats up for election every two years. Primary elections on August 18, 2020, determined which candidates appeared on the general election ballot on November 3, 2020.

Following the previous election in 2018, Republicans had control of the Alaska Senate with 13 seats to Democrats' 7 seats. One Democrat caucused with the Republicans, giving them a governing majority of 14 seats.

== Composition ==
Affiliation	Party (shading indicates majority caucus)		Total	
Affiliation	Republican	Democratic	Total	Vacant
Before election	13	7	20	0
After election	13	7	20	0
Change	Steady	Steady		Steady

== Predictions ==
Source	Ranking	As of
The Cook Political Report	Lean R	October 21, 2020

== Overview ==
2020 Alaska Senate election General election — November 3, 2020
Party	Votes	%	Seats not up	Seats up	Candidates	Before	After	+/–
Republican	104,467	57.84	5	8	10	13	13	Steady
Democratic	39,447	21.84	4	3	5	7	7	Steady
Independent	26,286	14.55	—	—	7 (Note: Includes nonpartisan candidate)	0	0	Steady
Alaska Independence	6,753	3.74	—	—	1	—	—	Steady
Write-ins	2,650	1.47	—	—	—	—	—	Steady
Libertarian	998	0.55	—	—	1	—	—	Steady
Total	180,601	100	11	9	24	20	20	Steady

== Close races ==
District	Winner	Margin
District H	Democratic	15.7%
District M	Republican	15.5%
District N	Republican	4.1%

== Incumbents defeated ==
=== In primary ===
Two Republican incumbents lost renomination.

1. N District: Senate President Cathy Giessel lost renomination to Roger Holland.
2. B District: John Coghill lost renomination to Robert Myers Jr.

== Results ==
District	Incumbent	Party	Elected Senator	Party
B	John Coghill	Rep	Robert Myers Jr.	Rep
D	David S. Wilson	Rep	David S. Wilson	Rep
F	Shelley Hughes	Rep	Shelley Hughes	Rep
H	Bill Wielechowski	Dem	Bill Wielechowski	Dem
J	Tom Begich	Dem	Tom Begich (Note: Did not face opposition in the general election.)	Dem
L	Natasha von Imhof	Rep	Natasha von Imhof	Rep
M (special)	Josh Revak	Rep	Josh Revak	Rep
N	Cathy Giessel	Rep	Roger Holland	Rep
P	Gary Stevens	Rep	Gary Stevens	Rep
R	Bert Stedman	Rep	Bert Stedman	Rep
T	Donny Olson	Dem	Donny Olson	Dem

== Detailed results ==
=== District B ===
Republican primary
John Coghill, the incumbent since 2009, was facing opposition in the Republican primary from Robert Myers Jr., who announced his candidacy for the seat on July 10. Trailing by 14 votes in the official count, incumbent Coghill asked for a recount, but, when the lead remained the same after the recount, Coghill conceded defeat and Myers was declared the winner.

Republican primary
Party	Candidate	Votes	%
Republican	Robert Myers Jr.	1,739	50.2
Republican	John Coghill (incumbent)	1,725	49.8
Total votes		3,462	100.0

General election

2020 Alaska Senate election, district B
Party	Candidate	Votes	%
Republican	Robert Myers Jr.	10,187	57.1
Independent	Marna Sanford	6,610	37.0
Independent	Evan Eads (unofficially withdrew)	986	5.5
Write-in	Write-ins	67	0.4
Total votes		17,867	100.0
Republican hold			

=== District D ===
David S. Wilson, the incumbent since 2017, was facing opposition in the Republican primary from five other candidates. Thomas Lamb, who filed as a nonpartisan on the Democratic primary ticket, qualified automatically for the general election. Republican primary

Republican primary
Party	Candidate	Votes	%
Republican	David S. Wilson (incumbent)	1,734	33.9
Republican	Stephen Wright	1,325	25.9
Republican	Loy "Santa" Thurman	1,134	22.2
Republican	Bee Rupright	469	9.2
Republican	Chandra McCain-Finch	340	6.7
Republican	Huhnkie Lee	110	2.2
Total votes		5,112	100.0

General election

2020 Alaska Senate election, district D
Party	Candidate	Votes	%
Republican	David S. Wilson (incumbent)	12,600	69.2
Nonpartisan	James D. "Dan" Mayfield	2,618	14.4
Independent	Thomas Lamb (Note: Candidate running as an independent with the Democratic party's nomination.)	2,613	14.3
Write-in	Write-ins	386	2.1
Total votes		18,217	100.0
Republican hold			

=== District F ===
Republican Shelley Hughes, the incumbent since 2017, and Independent Stephany Jeffers were the only two candidates to file for this seat. They both advanced unopposed to the general election. Jeffers withdrew her candidacy on August 31 and was replaced by fellow Independent Jim Cooper.

2020 Alaska Senate election, district F
Party	Candidate	Votes	%
Republican	Shelley Hughes (incumbent)	14,751	71.3
Independent	Jim Cooper	4,904	23.7
Libertarian	Gavin Christiansen	998	4.8
Write-in	Write-ins	29	0.1
Total votes		20,682	100.0
Republican hold			

=== District H ===
Democrat Bill Wielechowski, the incumbent since 2007, and Republican Madeline Gaiser were the only two candidates to file for this seat. They both advanced unopposed to the general election.

2020 Alaska Senate election, district H
Party	Candidate	Votes	%
Democratic	Bill Wielechowski (incumbent)	7,297	57.8
Republican	Madeline Gaiser	5,318	42.1
Write-in	Write-ins	19	0.1
Total votes		12,634	100.0
Democratic hold			

=== District J ===
Democrat Tom Begich, the incumbent since 2017, was the only candidate to file for this seat. He ran unopposed in the general election.

2020 Alaska Senate election, district J
Party	Candidate	Votes	%
Democratic	Tom Begich (incumbent)	9,235	92.6
Write-in	Write-ins	734	7.4
Total votes		9,969	100.0
Democratic hold			

=== District L ===
Republican primary
Natasha von Imhof, the incumbent since 2016, was facing opposition in the Republican primary from challenger Stephen Duplantis. Roselynn Cacy, the only Democrat to file, qualified automatically for the general election. Independent candidate Jeff Landfield withdrew his candidacy on August 31. Republican primary loser Stephen Duplantis announced intentions to register as a write-in candidate.

Republican primary
Party	Candidate	Votes	%
Republican	Natasha von Imhof (incumbent)	2,162	53.5
Republican	Stephen Duplantis	1,882	46.5
Total votes		4,044	100.0

General election

2020 Alaska Senate election, district L
Party	Candidate	Votes	%
Republican	Natasha von Imhof (incumbent)	10,203	59.7
Democratic	Roselynn Cacy	6,706	39.3
Write-in	Write-ins	169	1.0
Total votes		17,078	100.0
Republican hold			

=== District M (special) ===
After the death of Sen. Chris Birch in August 2019, Governor Mike Dunleavy appointed state representative Josh Revak to the Senate the following month. Revak was running as the incumbent and was seeking his first full term. He was challenged by two candidates in the Republican primary. In addition, two candidates were contesting the Democratic primary.

Democratic nominee Anita Thorne withdrew her candidacy on August 31. Republican primary

Republican primary
Party	Candidate	Votes	%
Republican	Josh Revak (incumbent)	2,499	66.2
Republican	Ray Metcalfe	911	24.2
Republican	Harold Borbridge	362	9.6
Total votes		3,772	100.0

Democratic primary

Democratic primary
Party	Candidate	Votes	%
Democratic	Anita Thorne	2,732	87.5
Democratic	Nicholas Willie	389	12.5
Total votes		3,121	100.0

General election

2020 Alaska Senate special election, district M
Party	Candidate	Votes	%
Republican	Josh Revak (incumbent)	10,390	57.6
Independent	Andy Holleman	7,596	42.1
Write-in	Write-ins	55	0.3
Total votes		18,041	100.0
Republican hold			

=== District N ===
Cathy Giessel, the incumbent since 2011 and the President of the Senate since January 2019, was facing opposition in the Republican primary from DOT&PF measurement scientist Roger Holland. Additionally, two candidates were contesting the Democratic primary. Republican primary

Republican primary
Party	Candidate	Votes	%
Republican	Roger Holland	3,686	64.2
Republican	Cathy Giessel (incumbent)	2,055	35.8
Total votes		5,741	100.0

Democratic primary

Democratic primary
Party	Candidate	Votes	%
Democratic	Carl Johnson	2,247	54.1
Democratic	Lynette Moreno Hinz	1,907	45.9
Total votes		4,154	100.0

General election

2020 Alaska Senate election, district N
Party	Candidate	Votes	%
Republican	Roger Holland	10,501	49.7
Democratic	Carl Johnson	9,648	45.6
Independent	Carolyn "Care" Clift	959	4.5
Write-in	Write-ins	40	0.2
Total votes		21,148	100.0
Republican hold			

=== District P ===
Gary Stevens, the incumbent since 2003, was facing opposition in the Republican primary from former state house candidate John Cox. Challenger Greg Madden contested the general election on the Alaskan Independence Party ticket. Republican primary

Republican primary
Party	Candidate	Votes	%
Republican	Gary Stevens (incumbent)	2,086	52.9
Republican	John "Bear" Cox	1,854	47.1
Total votes		3,940	100.0

General election

2020 Alaska Senate election, district P
Party	Candidate	Votes	%
Republican	Gary Stevens (incumbent)	12,507	64.7
Independence	Greg Madden	6,753	34.9
Write-in	Write-ins	75	0.4
Total votes		19,335	100.0
Republican hold			

=== District R ===
Republican primary
Bert Stedman, the incumbent since 2003, was facing opposition in the Republican primary from handyman Michael Sheldon.

Republican primary
Party	Candidate	Votes	%
Republican	Bert Stedman (incumbent)	1,926	63.8
Republican	Michael Sheldon	1,092	36.2
Total votes		3,018	100.0

General election

2020 Alaska Senate election, district R
Party	Candidate	Votes	%
Republican	Bert Stedman (incumbent)	14,578	93.7
Write-in	Write-ins	985	6.3
Total votes		15,563	100.0
Republican hold			

=== District T ===
Donny Olson, the incumbent since 2001, was running unopposed in the Democratic primary. Two Republican candidates, Kotzebue vice-mayor Thomas Baker and Deering tribal president Calvin Moto II, challenged him for the seat. Republican primary

Republican primary
Party	Candidate	Votes	%
Republican	Thomas Baker	674	60.7
Republican	Calvin Moto II	437	39.3
Total votes		1,111	100.0

General election

2020 Alaska Senate election, district T
Party	Candidate	Votes	%
Democratic	Donny Olson (incumbent)	6,561	65.1
Republican	Thomas Baker	3,432	34.0
Write-in	Write-ins	91	0.9
Total votes		10,084	100.0
Democratic hold			

== See also ==
- Alaska Senate
- 2020 Alaska House of Representatives election
- 2020 Alaska elections
- 2020 United States elections
