= 2010 Alaska Senate elections =

2010 Alaska Senate election
- November 2, 2010

10 of 20 seats in the Alaska Senate 11 seats needed for a majority
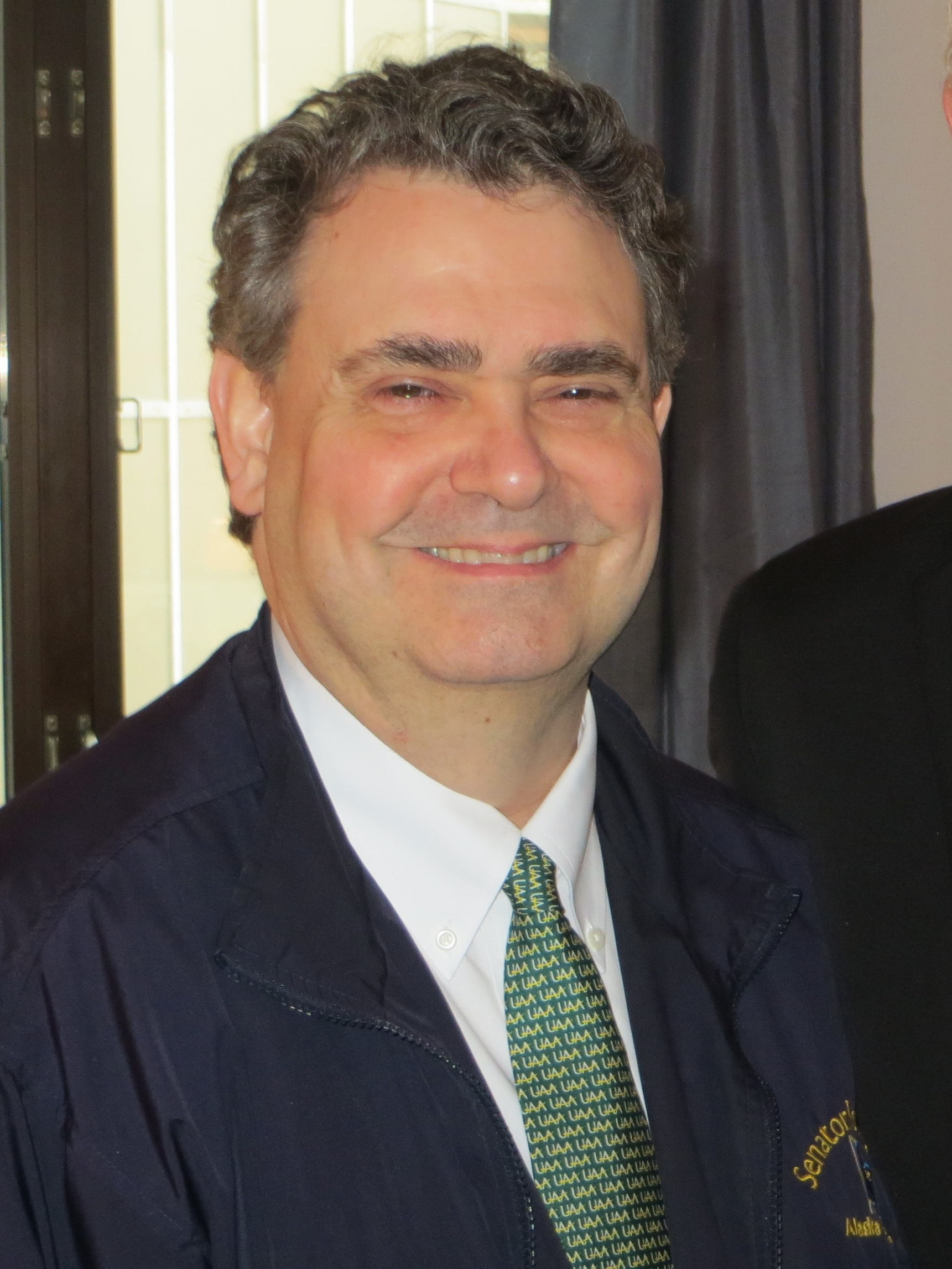

| | Majority party | Minority party |
|---|---|---|
| Leader | Johnny Ellis | Con Bunde (retired) |
| Party | Democratic | Republican |
| Leader since | January 19, 2009 | January 19, 2009 |
| Leader's seat | District L | District P |
| Last election | 10 | 10 |
| Seats after | 10 | 10 |
| Seat change | Steady | Steady |
| Popular vote | 50,164 | 53,895 |
| Percentage | 46.40% | 49.85% |
President pro tempore before election
Gary Stevens
Republican
Elected President pro tempore
Gary Stevens
Republican

The 2010 Alaska Senate election was held on November 2, 2010, to determine which party would control the Alaska Senate for the following two years in the 27th Alaska State Legislature. District 19 (District S) and all even-numbered districts (except District 20) were up for election. The primary was held on August 24, 2010. Prior to the election, the Alaska Senate was evenly split between Democrats and Republicans, with six Republicans and all Democrats joining a governing coalition in the previous legislature. The general election saw both parties holding on to the same amount of seats as the previous election, which resulted in five Republicans and all Democrats joining a governing coalition.

== Predictions ==
| Source | Ranking | As of |
|---|---|---|
| Governing | Tossup | November 1, 2010 |

== Retirements ==
1. District P: Con Bunde (R) retired.

== Results ==
=== District B ===
District B election, 2010
| Party | Candidate | Votes | % |
|---|---|---|---|
| Democratic | Dennis Egan (incumbent) | 11,683 | 96.96% |
| | Scattering | 366 | 3.04% |
| Total votes | | 12,049 | 100.0% |
| Democratic hold | | | |

=== District D ===
District D election, 2010
| Party | Candidate | Votes | % |
|---|---|---|---|
| Democratic | Joe Thomas (incumbent) | 9,723 | 57.15% |
| Republican | Pete Higgins | 7,245 | 42.59% |
| | Scattering | 45 | 0.26% |
| Total votes | | 17,013 | 100.0% |
| Democratic hold | | | |

=== District F ===
District F election, 2010
| Party | Candidate | Votes | % |
|---|---|---|---|
| Republican | John Coghill (incumbent) | 10,678 | 97.22% |
| | Scattering | 305 | 2.78% |
| Total votes | | 10,983 | 100.0% |
| Republican hold | | | |

=== District J ===
District J election, 2010
| Party | Candidate | Votes | % |
|---|---|---|---|
| Democratic | Bill Wielechowski (incumbent) | 4,975 | 58.15% |
| Republican | Ron Slepecki | 3,550 | 41.49% |
| | Scattering | 31 | 0.36% |
| Total votes | | 8,556 | 100.0% |
| Democratic hold | | | |

=== District L ===
District L election, 2010
| Party | Candidate | Votes | % |
|---|---|---|---|
| Democratic | Johnny Ellis (incumbent) | 6,159 | 61.21% |
| Republican | Richard M. Wanda | 3,852 | 38.28% |
| | Scattering | 51 | 0.51% |
| Total votes | | 10,062 | 100.0% |
| Democratic hold | | | |

=== District N ===
District N election, 2010
| Party | Candidate | Votes | % |
|---|---|---|---|
| Republican | Lesil McGuire (incumbent) | 9,746 | 69.14% |
| Democratic | Ed Cullinane | 3,697 | 26.23% |
| Independent | Clinton Desjarlais | 590 | 4.19% |
| | Scattering | 63 | 0.45% |
| Total votes | | 14,096 | 100.0% |
| Republican hold | | | |

=== District P ===
District P election, 2010
| Party | Candidate | Votes | % |
|---|---|---|---|
| Republican | Cathy Giessel | 9,255 | 50.29% |
| Democratic | Janet L. Reiser | 7,042 | 38.27% |
| Independent | Philip Dziubinski | 2,072 | 11.26% |
| | Scattering | 33 | 0.18% |
| Total votes | | 18,402 | 100.0% |
| Republican hold | | | |

=== District R ===
District R election, 2010
| Party | Candidate | Votes | % |
|---|---|---|---|
| Republican | Gary Stevens (incumbent) | 9,569 | 96.92% |
| | Scattering | 304 | 3.08% |
| Total votes | | 9,873 | 100.0% |
| Republican hold | | | |

=== District S ===
District S election, 2010
| Party | Candidate | Votes | % |
|---|---|---|---|
| Democratic | Lyman Hoffman (incumbent) | 6,885 | 97.25% |
| | Scattering | 195 | 2.75% |
| Total votes | | 7,080 | 100.0% |
| Democratic hold | | | |
