= Alaska Senate district B =

Alaskan legislative district

Alaska's B State Senate district
Senator
Jesse Kiehl; D
since January 15, 2019
- Demographics: 63% White; 0.9% Black; 6.1% Hispanic; 5.9% Asian; 10.3% Native American; 1.3% Hawaiian/Pacific Islander; 0.6% Other; 12% Multiracial
- Population: 36,317

Alaska Senate district B is one of 20 districts of the Alaska Senate. It is represented by Democrat Jesse Kiehl since 2019. District B is located in Southeast Alaska and encompasses the entirety of Alaska's 3rd House of Representatives district and 4th House of Representatives district, including the cities of Juneau and Skagway.

From 2013 to 2022, district B covered part of the Fairbanks North Star Borough and Yukon–Koyukuk Census Area - these parts are now encompassed by district Q and district R.

== Election results (2022 boundaries) ==
=== 2024 ===
Nonpartisan primary
Party	Candidate	Votes	%
Democratic	Jesse Kiehl (incumbent)	6,256	100.0
Total votes		6,256	100.0

General election
Party	Candidate	Votes	%
Democratic	Jesse Kiehl (incumbent)	15,508	96.51
Write-in		561	3.49
Total votes		16,069	100.0
Democratic hold			
Coalition hold			

=== 2022 ===
Nonpartisan primary
Party	Candidate	Votes	%
Democratic	Jesse Kiehl (incumbent)	8,921	100.0
Total votes		8,921	100.0

General election
Party	Candidate	Votes	%
Democratic	Jesse Kiehl (incumbent)	12,724	95.8
Write-in	Write-ins	554	4.2
Total votes		13,278	100.0
Democratic hold			

== Election results (2012 boundaries) ==
Map of District B of the Alaska Senate from 2013 to 2022

=== 2020 ===
Republican primary
Party	Candidate	Votes	%
Republican	Robert Myers Jr.	1,739	50.2
Republican	John Coghill (incumbent)	1,725	49.8
Total votes		3,462	100.0

General election
Party	Candidate	Votes	%
Republican	Robert Myers Jr.	10,187	57.1
Independent	Marna Sanford	6,610	37.0
Independent	Evan Eads (unofficially withdrew)	986	5.5
Write-in	Write-ins	67	0.4
Total votes		17,867	100.0
Republican hold			

=== 2016 ===
Republican primary
Party	Candidate	Votes	%
Republican	John Coghill (incumbent)	1,421	100.0
Total votes		1,421	100

Democratic primary
Party	Candidate	Votes	%
Democratic	Luke Hopkins	1,036	100.0
Total votes		1,036	100

General election
Party	Candidate	Votes	%
Republican	John Coghill (incumbent)	8,429	52.96
Democratic	Luke Hopkins	7,336	46.09
Write-ins	Write-ins	151	0.95
Total votes		15,916	100
Republican hold			

== Election results (2012 boundaries) ==
Map of District B of the Alaska Senate from 2012 to 2013

=== 2012 ===
Republican primary
Party	Candidate	Votes	%
Republican	Pete Kelly	2,386	100.0
Total votes		2,386	100.0

Democratic primary
Party	Candidate	Votes	%
Democratic	Joe Paskvan (incumbent)	1,224	100.0
Total votes		1,224	100

General election
Party	Candidate	Votes	%
Republican	Pete Kelly	6,232	54.11
Democratic	Joe Paskvan (incumbent)	5,249	45.58
Write-ins	Write-ins	36	0.31
Total votes		11,517	100
Republican gain from Democratic			

== List of senators representing the district ==
Senators	Party	Years served	Electoral history	Area represented
John Coghill (Fairbanks)	Republican	January 22, 2017 – January 18, 2021	Redistricted from District A and re-elected in 2016. Lost re-nomination.	Fairbanks North Star Borough
Robert Myers Jr. (North Pole)	Republican	January 18, 2021 – January 17, 2023	Elected in 2020. Redistricted to District Q.	Fairbanks North Star Borough
Jesse Kiehl (Juneau)	Democratic	January 17, 2023 – present	Redistricted from District Q and re-elected in 2022. Re-elected in 2024.	Southeast Alaska
