= Senator Coghill =

Senator Coghill may refer to:

- Jack Coghill (1925–2019), Alaska State Senate
- John Coghill (born 1950), Alaska State Senate
