= Paskvan =

Paskvan is a surname. Notable people with the surname include:

- George Paskvan (1918–2005), American football fullback
- Joe Paskvan (born 1952), American attorney and politician
