= Alaska Senate district A =

Alaskan legislative district

Alaska's A State Senate district
Senator
Bert Stedman; R–Sitka
since November 20, 2003
- Demographics: 56.2% White; 0.6% Black; 4.7% Hispanic; 5.3% Asian; 21.1% Native American; 0.3% Hawaiian/Pacific Islander; 0.6% Other; 11.3% Multiracial
- Population: 35,969

Alaska Senate district A is one of 20 districts of the Alaska Senate. It has been represented by Republican Bert Stedman since 2023. Stedman previously represented the district from 2003 to 2013. District A is located in Southeast Alaska and encompasses the entirety of Alaska's 1st House of Representatives district and 2nd House of Representatives district, including the cities of Ketchikan and Sitka.

From 2013 to 2022, district A covered the city of Fairbanks - this area is now encompassed by District P.

== Election results (2022 boundaries) ==
=== 2022 ===
Nonpartisan primary
Party	Candidate	Votes	%
Republican	Bert Stedman (incumbent)	5,537	68.9
Republican	Mike Sheldon	2,505	31.1
Total votes		8,042	100.00

General election
Party	Candidate	Votes	%
Republican	Bert Stedman (incumbent)	8,902	68.8
Republican	Mike Sheldon	3,941	30.5
Write-in	Write-ins	98	0.8
Total votes		12,941	100.0
Republican hold			

== Election results (2013 boundaries) ==
Map of District A of the Alaska Senate from 2013 to 2022

=== 2018 ===
Republican primary
Party	Candidate	Votes	%
Republican	Pete Kelly (incumbent)	1,497	100.0
Total votes		1,497	100

Democratic primary
Party	Candidate	Votes	%
Democratic	Scott Kawasaki	1,206	100.0
Total votes		1,206	100

General election
Party	Candidate	Votes	%
Democratic	Scott Kawasaki	4,577	50.79
Republican	Pete Kelly (incumbent)	4,398	48.80
Write-ins	Write-ins	37	0.41
Total votes		9,012	100
Democratic gain from Republican			

=== 2014 ===
Republican primary
Party	Candidate	Votes	%
Republican	Pete Kelly (incumbent)	2,877	100.0
Total votes		2,877	100

Democratic primary
Party	Candidate	Votes	%
Democratic	Tamara Kruse Roselius	1,720	100.0
Total votes		1,720	100

General election
Party	Candidate	Votes	%
Republican	Pete Kelly (incumbent)	5,393	60.42
Democratic	Tamara Kruse Roselius	3,484	39.03
Write-ins	Write-ins	49	0.55
Total votes		8,926	100
Republican hold			

== Election results (2012 boundaries) ==
Map of District A of the Alaska Senate from 2012 to 2013

=== 2012 ===
Republican primary
Party	Candidate	Votes	%
Republican	John Coghill (incumbent)	4,374	100.0
Total votes		4,374	100

Democratic primary
Party	Candidate	Votes	%
Democratic	Joe Thomas	1,246	100.0
Total votes		1,246	100

General election
Party	Candidate	Votes	%
Republican	John Coghill (incumbent)	9,464	60.35
Democratic	Joe Thomas (incumbent)	6,175	39.38
Write-ins	Write-ins	43	0.27
Total votes		15,682	100
Republican gain from Democratic			

== List of senators representing the district ==
Senators	Party	Years served	Electoral history	Area represented
Pete Kelly (Fairbanks)	Republican	2015 – 2019	Redistricted from District B and re-elected in 2014. Lost re-election in 2018.	Fairbanks
Scott Kawasaki (Fairbanks)	Democratic	2019 – 2023	Elected in 2018. Redistricted to District P in 2022.	Fairbanks
Bert Stedman (Sitka)	Republican	2023 – present	Redistricted from District R and re-elected in 2022.	Southeast Alaska
