= Alaska Senate district C =

Alaskan legislative district

Alaska's C State Senate district
Senator
Gary Stevens; R–Kodiak
since 2023
- Population: 37,141

Alaska Senate district C is one of 20 districts of the Alaska Senate. It has been represented by Republican Gary Stevens since 2023. Prior to redistricting, Stevens represented the R District from 2003 to 2015 and the P District from 2015 to 2023. District C encompasses the entirety of Alaska's 5th House of Representatives district and 6th House of Representatives district, including Kodiak Island, Seward, Cordova, Kachemak Bay, Ninilchik, and Kasilof.

From 2013 to 2022, district C covered parts of Yukon-Koyukuk Census Area, Denali Borough, Southeast Fairbanks Census Area, and Copper River Census Area - these areas are now encompassed by district O, district R, and district Q.

== Election results (2022 boundaries) ==
=== 2022 ===
Nonpartisan primary
Party	Candidate	Votes	%
Republican	Gary Stevens (incumbent)	6,208	63.2
Republican	Heath Smith	2,634	26.8
Republican	Walter Jones	984	10.0
Total votes		9,826	100.00

General election
Party	Candidate	Votes	%
Republican	Gary Stevens (incumbent)	7,867	56.3
Republican	Heath Smith	4,353	31.1
Republican	Walter Jones	1,623	11.6
Write-in	Write-ins	132	0.9
Total votes		13,975	100.0
Republican hold			

== Election results (2013 boundaries) ==
Map of District C of the Alaska Senate from 2013 to 2022

=== 2018 ===
Republican primary
Party	Candidate	Votes	%
Republican	Click Bishop (incumbent)	2,477	100.0
Total votes		2,477	100

General election
Party	Candidate	Votes	%
Republican	Click Bishop (incumbent)	10,030	92.05
Write-ins	Write-ins	866	7.95
Total votes		10,896	100
Republican hold			

=== 2014 ===
Republican primary
Party	Candidate	Votes	%
Republican	Click Bishop (incumbent)	4,529	100.0
Total votes		4,529	100

Democratic primary
Party	Candidate	Votes	%
Democratic	Dorothy J. Shockley	2,649	100.0
Total votes		2,649	100

General election
Party	Candidate	Votes	%
Republican	Click Bishop (incumbent)	8,424	64.01
Democratic	Dorothy J. Shockley	4,659	35.40
Write-ins	Write-ins	77	0.59
Total votes		13,160	100
Republican hold			

== Election results (2012 boundaries) ==
Map of District C of the Alaska Senate from 2012 to 2013

=== 2012 ===
Republican primary
Party	Candidate	Votes	%
Republican	Click Bishop	2,679	47.06
Republican	Ralph Seekins	1,768	31.06
Republican	David Eastman	1,246	21.89
Total votes		5,693	100

Democratic primary
Party	Candidate	Votes	%
Democratic	Anne Sudkamp	1,159	100.0
Total votes		1,159	100

General election
Party	Candidate	Votes	%
Republican	Click Bishop	10,051	70.40
Democratic	Anne Sudkamp	4,074	28.54
Write-ins	Write-ins	152	1.06
Total votes		14,277	100
Republican hold			
