= Alaska Senate district Q =

Alaskan legislative district

Alaska's Q State Senate district
Senator
| Robert Myers Jr. R–North Pole |
since 2023
- Population: 36,882

Alaska Senate district Q is one of 20 districts of the Alaska Senate. It has been represented by Republican Robert Myers Jr. since 2023. Myers previously represented District B from 2021−2023. Also known as “Q Bloc”, District Q is located in the Fairbanks North Star Borough and encompasses the entirety of Alaska's 33th House of Representatives district and 34th House of Representatives district, including North Pole, Badger, Steele Creek, Two Rivers, Eielson AFB, and Salcha.

From 2013 to 2022, the district covered portions of Skagway, Haines Borough, Juneau, and Hoonah–Angoon Census Area - these areas are now encompassed by district A and district B.

== Election results (2022 boundaries) ==
=== 2022 ===
Nonpartisan primary
| Party | Candidate | Votes | % |
|---|---|---|---|
| Republican | Robert Myers Jr. (incumbent) | 5,506 | 62.9 |
| Independent | John Bennett | 2,711 | 31.0 |
| Independence | Arthur Serkov | 539 | 6.2 |
| Total votes | | 8,756 | 100.00 |

General election
| Party | Candidate | Votes | % |
|---|---|---|---|
| Republican | Robert Myers Jr. (incumbent) | 8,119 | 62.6 |
| Independent | John Bennett | 4,009 | 30.9 |
| Independence | Arthur Serkov | 774 | 6.0 |
| Write-in | Write-ins | 74 | 0.6 |
| Total votes | | 12,976 | 100.0 |
| Republican hold | | | |

== Election results (2013 boundaries) ==
Map of District Q of the Alaska Senate from 2013 to 2022

=== 2018 ===
Democratic primary
| Party | Candidate | Votes | % |
|---|---|---|---|
| Democratic | Jesse Kiehl | 4,740 | 100.0 |
| Total votes | | 4,740 | 100 |

General election
| Party | Candidate | Votes | % |
|---|---|---|---|
| Democratic | Jesse Kiehl | 11,121 | 61.88 |
| Independent | Don Etheridge | 6,803 | 37.85 |
| Write-ins | Write-ins | 49 | 0.27 |
| Total votes | | 17,973 | 100 |
| Democratic hold | | | |

=== 2014 ===
Republican primary
| Party | Candidate | Votes | % |
|---|---|---|---|
| Republican | Tom Williams | 3,799 | 100.0 |
| Total votes | | 3,799 | 100 |

Democratic primary
| Party | Candidate | Votes | % |
|---|---|---|---|
| Democratic | Dennis Egan (incumbent) | 5,960 | 100.0 |
| Total votes | | 5,960 | 100 |

General election
| Party | Candidate | Votes | % |
|---|---|---|---|
| Democratic | Dennis Egan (incumbent) | 12,521 | 72.14 |
| Republican | Tom Williams | 4,753 | 27.38 |
| Write-ins | Write-ins | 83 | 0.48 |
| Total votes | | 17,357 | 100 |
| Democratic hold | | | |

== Election results (2012 boundaries) ==
Map of District Q of the Alaska Senate from 2012 to 2013

=== 2012 ===
Republican primary
| Party | Candidate | Votes | % |
|---|---|---|---|
| Republican | Bert Stedman (incumbent) | 3,446 | 100.0 |
| Total votes | | 3,446 | 100 |

Democratic primary
| Party | Candidate | Votes | % |
|---|---|---|---|
| Democratic | Albert Kookesh (incumbent) | 1,736 | 100.0 |
| Total votes | | 1,736 | 100 |

General election
| Party | Candidate | Votes | % |
|---|---|---|---|
| Republican | Bert Stedman (incumbent) | 9,829 | 64.30 |
| Democratic | Albert Kookesh (incumbent) | 5,413 | 35.41 |
| Write-ins | Write-ins | 44 | 0.29 |
| Total votes | | 15,286 | 100 |
| Republican gain from Democratic | | | |
