= Alaska Senate district P =

Alaskan legislative district

Alaska's P State Senate district
Senator
| Scott Kawasaki; D–Fairbanks |
since 2023
- Population: 36,816

Alaska Senate district P is one of 20 districts of the Alaska Senate. It has been represented by Democrat Scott Kawasaki since 2023. Kawasaki previously represented District A from 2019−2023. District P is located in the Fairbanks North Star Borough and encompasses the entirety of Alaska's 31st House of Representatives district and 32nd House of Representatives district, including Fairbanks and Fort Wainwright.

From 2013 to 2022, the district covered portions of Kenai Peninsula Borough, Kodiak Island Borough, Chugach Census Area, and Yakutat - these areas are now encompassed by district A, district C, district D, and district S.

== Election results (2022 boundaries) ==
=== 2024 ===
Nonpartisan primary
| Party | Candidate | Votes | % |
|---|---|---|---|
| Republican | Leslie Hajdukovich | 1,764 | 51.35 |
| Democratic | Scott Kawasaki (incumbent) | 1,671 | 48.65 |
| Total votes | | 3,435 | 100.0 |

General election
| Party | Candidate | Votes | % |
|---|---|---|---|
| Democratic | Scott Kawasaki (incumbent) | 5,913 | 51.39 |
| Republican | Leslie Hajdukovich | 5,561 | 48.33 |
| Write-in | | 32 | 0.28 |
| Total votes | | 11,506 | 100.0 |
| Democratic hold | | | |
| Coalition hold | | | |

=== 2022 ===
Nonpartisan primary
| Party | Candidate | Votes | % |
|---|---|---|---|
| Democratic | Scott Kawasaki (incumbent) | 2,664 | 48.8 |
| Republican | Jim Matherly | 2,426 | 44.4 |
| Republican | Alex Jafre | 370 | 6.8 |
| Total votes | | 5,460 | 100.00 |

General election
| Party | Candidate | Votes | % |
|---|---|---|---|
| Democratic | Scott Kawasaki (incumbent) | 4,274 | 51.1 |
| Republican | Jim Matherly | 3,509 | 42.0 |
| Republican | Alex Jafre | 539 | 6.4 |
| Write in | Write-ins | 35 | 0.4 |
| Total votes | | 8,357 | 100.00 |
| Democratic hold | | | |

== Election results (2013 boundaries) ==
Map of District P of the Alaska Senate from 2013 to 2022

=== 2020 ===
Republican primary
| Party | Candidate | Votes | % |
|---|---|---|---|
| Republican | Gary Stevens (incumbent) | 2,086 | 52.9 |
| Republican | John "Bear" Cox | 1,854 | 47.1 |
| Total votes | | 3,940 | 100.0 |

Democratic primary
| Party | Candidate | Votes | % |
|---|---|---|---|
| Independence | Greg Madden | 2,284 | 100.0 |
| Total votes | | 2,284 | 100.0 |

General election
| Party | Candidate | Votes | % |
|---|---|---|---|
| Republican | Gary Stevens (incumbent) | 12,507 | 64.7 |
| Independence | Greg Madden | 6,753 | 34.9 |
| Write-in | Write-ins | 75 | 0.4 |
| Total votes | | 19,335 | 100.0 |
| Republican hold | | | |

=== 2016 ===
Republican primary
| Party | Candidate | Votes | % |
|---|---|---|---|
| Republican | Gary Stevens (incumbent) | 3,372 | 100.0 |
| Total votes | | 3,372 | 100 |

General election
| Party | Candidate | Votes | % |
|---|---|---|---|
| Republican | Gary Stevens (incumbent) | 12,950 | 96.40 |
| Write-ins | Write-ins | 484 | 3.60 |
| Total votes | | 13,434 | 100 |
| Republican hold | | | |

=== 2014 ===
Republican primary
| Party | Candidate | Votes | % |
|---|---|---|---|
| Republican | Gary Stevens (incumbent) | 4,889 | 100.0 |
| Total votes | | 4,889 | 100 |

Democratic primary
| Party | Candidate | Votes | % |
|---|---|---|---|
| Democratic | Robert "Moose" Henrichs | 2,260 | 100.0 |
| Total votes | | 2,260 | 100 |

General election
| Party | Candidate | Votes | % |
|---|---|---|---|
| Republican | Gary Stevens (incumbent) | 9,889 | 71.57 |
| Democratic | Robert "Moose" Henrichs | 3,866 | 27.98 |
| Write-ins | Write-ins | 62 | 0.45 |
| Total votes | | 13,817 | 100 |
| Republican hold | | | |
