= Kevin Meyer (politician) =

American politician

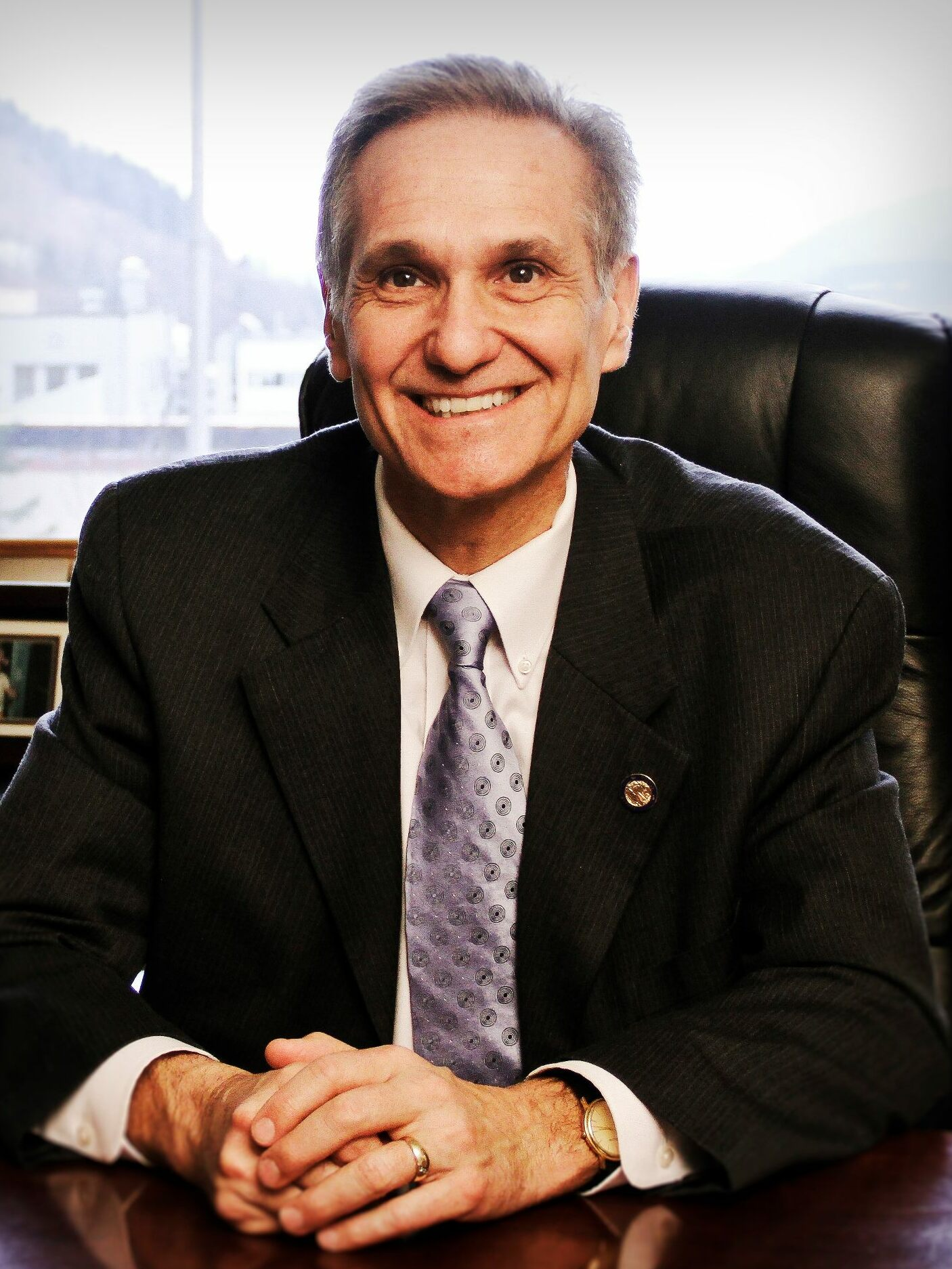
- Meyer in 2014

14th Lieutenant Governor of Alaska
- In office December 3, 2018 – December 5, 2022
- Governor: Mike Dunleavy
- Preceded by: Valerie Davidson
- Succeeded by: Nancy Dahlstrom

President of the Alaska Senate
- In office January 20, 2015 – January 17, 2017
- Preceded by: Charlie Huggins
- Succeeded by: Pete Kelly

Majority Leader of the Alaska Senate
- In office January 18, 2011 – January 15, 2013
- Preceded by: Johnny Ellis
- Succeeded by: John Coghill

Member of the Alaska Senate
- In office January 20, 2009 – December 3, 2018
- Preceded by: John Cowdery (O)
- Succeeded by: Chris Birch
- Constituency: O district (2009–2013); L district (2013–2015); M district (2015–2018)

Member of the Alaska House of Representatives
- In office January 8, 2001 – January 20, 2009
- Preceded by: Jerry Sanders
- Succeeded by: Charisse Millett
- Constituency: 19th district (2001–2003); 30th district (2003–2009)

Chair of the Anchorage Assembly
- In office December 14, 1999 – May 16, 2000
- Preceded by: George Wuerch
- Succeeded by: Fay Von Gemmingen

Member of the Anchorage Assembly from Seat G
- In office May 1, 1993 – January 7, 2001
- Preceded by: Duane French
- Succeeded by: Dick Traini

Personal details
- Born: Kevin Gerald Meyer; May 9, 1956 (age 70) Beatrice, Nebraska, U.S.
- Party: Republican
- Spouse: Marty
- Children: 2
- Education: University of Nebraska–Lincoln (BS); University of New Mexico (MPA); Alaska Pacific University (MBA)

Kevin Gerald Meyer (born May 9, 1956 in Beatrice, Nebraska) is an American politician who served as the 14th lieutenant governor of Alaska from 2018 to 2022. He was a Republican member of the Alaska Senate from January 20, 2009 to December 3, 2018, representing District M. He was president of the Alaska Senate, leading a caucus of 14 Republicans and 1 Democrat from 2015 to 2017. Meyer served in the Alaska Legislature continuously from 2003 to 2018, in both the Alaska House of Representatives and Senate, previously representing the district when it was District O. He works as an investment recovery coordinator for ConocoPhillips.

On December 29, 2021, Meyer announced that he would not be seeking a second term.

== Education ==
Meyer earned his BS in business administration from the University of Nebraska–Lincoln, his MPA from the University of New Mexico in Albuquerque, and his MBA from Alaska Pacific University.

== Elections ==
- 2000: Challenging incumbent Republican Representative Jerry Sanders for the District 19 seat, Meyer won the August 22, 2000 primary with 706 votes (54.94%) and won the November 7, 2000 General election with 4,502 votes (64.67%) against Democratic nominee Patti Higgins, who had previously run for the seat in 1996 and 1998.
- 2002: Meyer was unopposed for the August 27, 2002 Republican primary, winning with 1,664 votes, and was unopposed for the November 5, 2002 General election, winning with 4,891 votes (96.41%) against write-in candidates.
- 2004: Meyer was unopposed for the August 24, 2004 Republican primary, winning with 1,664 votes, and won the November 2, 2004 General election with 5,407 votes (70.96%), against Democratic nominee Rachael Higgins.
- 2006: Meyer was unopposed for the August 22, 2006 Republican primary, winning with 2,530 votes, and was unopposed for the November 7, 2006 General election with 4,893 votes (94.55%), against write-in candidates.
- 2008: When Republican Senator John Cowdery retired and left the District O seat open, Meyer was unopposed for the August 26, 2008 Republican Primary, winning with 4,515 votes, Meyer won the November 4, 2008 General election with 9,874 votes (68.88%) against Democratic nominee Doug Van Etten.
- 2012: With Democratic Senator Johnny Ellis redistricted to District I, Meyer was unopposed for the District L August 28, 2012 Republican Primary winning with 3,110 votes, and won the November 6, 2012 General election with 10,304 votes (72.41%) against Democratic nominee Jake Hale.

== Controversies ==
In 2013, Meyer voted with the Alaska Senate Majority to pass Senate Bill 21, restructuring the state of Alaska's tax code for oil companies and reducing their tax burden. This vote benefited Meyer's full-time employer, ConocoPhillips. (Membership in the Alaska state legislature is not a full-time position, and Meyer, like many of his fellow members, maintain full-time employment elsewhere, taking leave when the legislature is in session.) When the bill came to the Senate floor, Meyer asked to be recused from voting. Under legislative rules, however, a member of the legislature must vote if any other members object, and several did.

In 2015, Meyer announced he had offered a contract for communications consulting to McHugh Pierre. Pierre formerly served as the civilian second in command for the Alaska State Department of Military and Veterans Affairs, but was forced to resign in 2014 after investigation revealed he had exerted inappropriate and undue influence to derail an investigation of a high school friend of his then serving in the National Guard and suspected of sexually assaulting another member of the Alaska National Guard. Investigation also revealed Pierre attempted to coerce whistle-blowers into signing non-disclosure agreements prohibiting them from speaking to the media or outsiders about ongoing problems with multiple sexual assaults and other misconduct in the Alaska National Guard. Meyer described the allegations against Pierre, including those contained in the report prepared by the National Guard Bureau's Office of Complex Investigations as "hearsay."

In 2020, Meyer decided to mail absentee ballot applications to voters 65 and older, but not to younger voters. The Disability Law Center of Alaska and other plaintiffs are suing Lieutenant Governor Meyer and the State of Alaska on the grounds that this constitutes unconstitutional discrimination. The plaintiffs want absentee ballot applications mailed to all voters.

Political offices
Preceded by Duane French	Member of the Anchorage Assembly from Seat G 1993–2001	Succeeded by Dick Traini
Preceded by George Wuerch	Chair of the Anchorage Assembly; 1999–2000	Succeeded by Fay Von Gemmingen
Preceded by Charlie Huggins	President of the Alaska Senate; 2015–2017	Succeeded by Pete Kelly
Preceded by Valerie Davidson	Lieutenant Governor of Alaska; 2018–2022	Succeeded by Nancy Dahlstrom
Alaska House of Representatives
Preceded by Jerry Sanders	Member of the Alaska House of Representatives from the 19th district 2001–2003	Succeeded by Tom Anderson
Preceded by Joe Hayes	Member of the Alaska House of Representatives from the 30th district 2003–2009	Succeeded by Charisse Millett
Alaska Senate
Preceded by John Cowdery	Member of the Alaska Senate from O district 2009–2013	Succeeded by Peter Micciche
Preceded by Johnny Ellis	Member of the Alaska Senate from L district 2013–2015	Succeeded by Lesil McGuire
Preceded by Anna MacKinnon	Member of the Alaska Senate from M district 2015–2018	Succeeded by Chris Birch
Preceded by Johnny Ellis	Majority Leader of the Alaska Senate; 2011–2013	Succeeded by John Coghill
Party political offices
Preceded by Dan Sullivan	Republican nominee for Lieutenant Governor of Alaska; 2018	Succeeded by Nancy Dahlstrom
