= Con Bunde =

American educator and politician

Conley Ralph "Con" Bunde (born August 4, 1938) was an American educator and politician. He was born in Mankato, Minnesota.

Bunde graduated from Mankato High School in 1956. He then served in the United States Army for three years. Bunde received his bachelor's and master's degree from Central Washington University in 1966 and 1970. He lived in Ketchikan, Alaska in 1962 and moved to Anchorage, Alaska in 1968. Bunde taught speech communication at University of Alaska Anchorage. In between 1993 and 2003, Bunde served in the Alaska House of Representatives and was a Republican. He then served in the Alaska State Senate from 2003 to 2011.
