= Cathy Giessel =

American politician (born 1951)

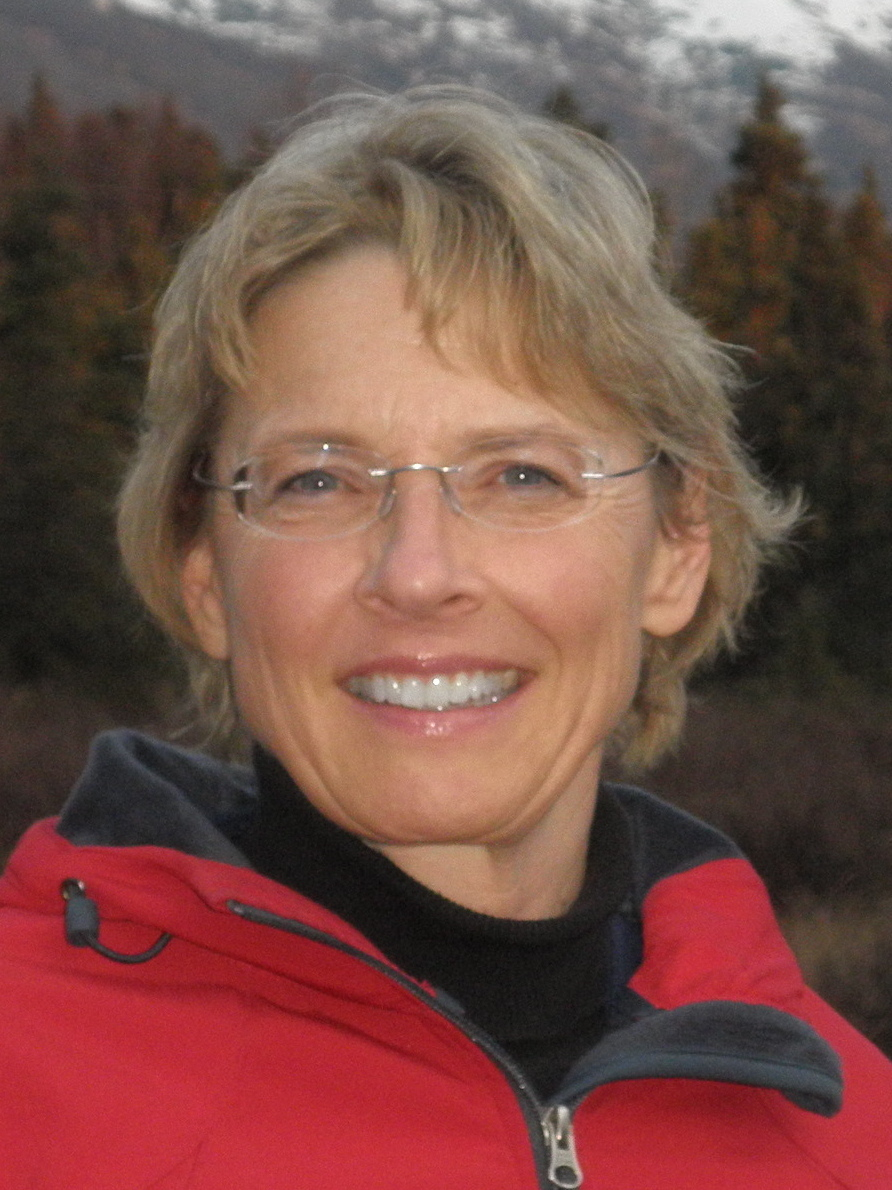
- Giessel in 2011

Majority Leader of the Alaska Senate
- Incumbent
- Assumed office January 17, 2023
- Preceded by: Shelley Hughes

President of the Alaska Senate
- In office January 15, 2019 – January 19, 2021
- Preceded by: Pete Kelly
- Succeeded by: Peter Micciche

Member of the Alaska Senate
- Incumbent
- Assumed office January 17, 2023
- Preceded by: Roger Holland
- Constituency: District E
- In office January 18, 2011 – January 19, 2021
- Preceded by: Con Bunde
- Succeeded by: Roger Holland
- Constituency: District P (2011–2013); District N (2013–2021)

Personal details
- Born: Catherine Andrea Bohms; November 9, 1951 (age 75) Fairbanks, Alaska, U.S.
- Party: Republican
- Spouse: Richard
- Children: 3
- Education: University of Michigan, Ann Arbor (BS); University of Alaska, Anchorage (MS)
- Website: Official website

Catherine Andrea Giessel (née Bohms; born November 9, 1951) is an American politician. A member of the Republican Party, she has served as Majority Leader of the Alaska Senate since 2023. From 2013 to 2021, she represented District N in the Alaska Senate including Northeast Anchorage, Anchorage Hillside and the Turnagain Arm communities of Bird, Girdwood, Indian, and Anchorage, all within the municipality of Anchorage. First elected in 2010 while identifying with Tea Party values, she has also served as the vice-chair of the state Republican Party and had a career in nursing. After redistricting, she was elected to a different senate seat in 2012.

Giessel serves as chair of the Resources Committee and is a member of the Senate Majority Caucus. After Senate President Pete Kelly was unseated in 2018, she was elected president of the Alaska Senate, a post she held until 2021. She returned to the Alaska Senate in 2023, representing the newly configured District E after defeating incumbent Republican Roger Holland. She serves as Senate majority leader in the 33rd Legislature, overseeing a coalition caucus of eight Republicans and nine Democrats.

== Early life and career ==
Cathy Giessel was born Catherine Andrea Bohms in Fairbanks, Alaska on November 9, 1951, the oldest of three daughters (and four children overall) born to Gerald Johnson "Jerry" (1924–2002) and Ruth Odelia (née Bauer, born 1927) Bohms. Jerry arrived in Alaska in the late 1940s and worked for Wien Alaska Airlines (a predecessor to Wien Air Alaska). Ruth holds a degree from Gonzaga University School of Law in Spokane, Washington and was admitted before the bars of Alaska and the United States Supreme Court. Ruth was a candidate for the Alaska Legislature in 1992, running as an Alaskan Independence Party candidate for a Fairbanks-based seat in the Alaska House of Representatives. Cathy Giessel graduated from Lathrop High School in Fairbanks and earned a Bachelor of Science in nursing degree from the University of Michigan in Ann Arbor before moving to Anchorage in 1974.

She worked as an advanced nurse practitioner across a variety of clinics in Anchorage and the North Slope Borough and continues to do healthcare consulting. She received a master's degree in nursing from the University of Alaska Anchorage in 2000. She has been on the Alaska Board of Nursing, serving five years as its chairperson, and on the Alaska Healthcare Strategy Planning Council. In 2010, she was named an 'exceptional leader' by the National Council of State Boards of Nursing.

== Political involvement ==
Before winning her Senate seat, Giessel served on Sean Parnell's campaign team during his race against incumbent Don Young during the Republican primary for Alaska's congressional seat in 2008. Parnell later became governor.

== Alaska Senate ==
=== 2016: Senate District N election ===
Giessel was up for reelection in 2016. Due to previous issues resulting from redistricting, it was the first time Giessel was eligible for a 4-year term. Her initial Democratic challenger, local non-profit executive and advocate Hilary Morgan, dropped out of the senate race early in 2016. Shortly before the filing deadline, longtime registered Democrat and president of the Alaska AFL-CIO, Vince Beltrami emerged, filing to run as an independent. The race became one of the most expensive state senate races in Alaska history. Giessel won the November general election defeating challenger Vince Beltrami, 51.90% to 47.57%. She again campaigned on positions strongly supporting natural resource development, diversified economic development, right-sizing Alaska state government, the creation of a comprehensive plan to the state government's budget challenges, and supported more school choice options for parents of K-12 students. Due to a continued budget shortfall, further reductions in state spending were a top priority for the new senate majority caucus. Other priorities of the caucus are plans to pass a state spending limit bill and review formula driven programs to make additional reforms to the state's most costly programs in an effort to get the state budget under control.

Committee assignments

- Resources (chair)
- Special Committee on Arctic Policy (chair)
- Health and Social Services
- State Affairs
- Education
- Legislative Budget and Audit
- Legislative Council (alternate)
- Finance Subcommittee
  - Environmental Conservation
  - Health & Social Services
  - Natural Resources

==== Caucus memberships ====
- In-state Gas Caucus
- Outdoor Heritage Caucus

=== 2014: Senate District N election ===
Though elected in 2012 following redistricting, a challenge to the newly drawn districts caused Giessel to be up for reelection again in 2014. She won the November general election, defeating Democratic challenger Harry Crawford Jr., 54.7% to 44.97%. This time Giessel was elected to a 2-year seat up for reelection in 2016. She campaigned on a position of pro natural resource development, in-state gasline development, and diversified economic development. She supported more school choice options for parents of K-12 students. Due to the sharp fall of oil prices and Alaska's ensuing fiscal gap in 2015, the budget and curbing state spending became top priorities for the new senate majority caucus. Education funding was another top priority for the caucus.

==== Committee assignments ====
- Resources (chair)
- Special Committee on Arctic Policy (co-chair)
- Health and Social Services (vice-chair)
- Labor and Commerce (vice-chair)
- Education
- Legislative Budget and Audit
- Finance Subcommittee
  - Environmental Conservation
  - Health & Social Services
  - Natural Resources

==== Caucus memberships ====
- In-state Gas Caucus
- Outdoor Heritage Caucus

=== 2012: Senate District N election ===
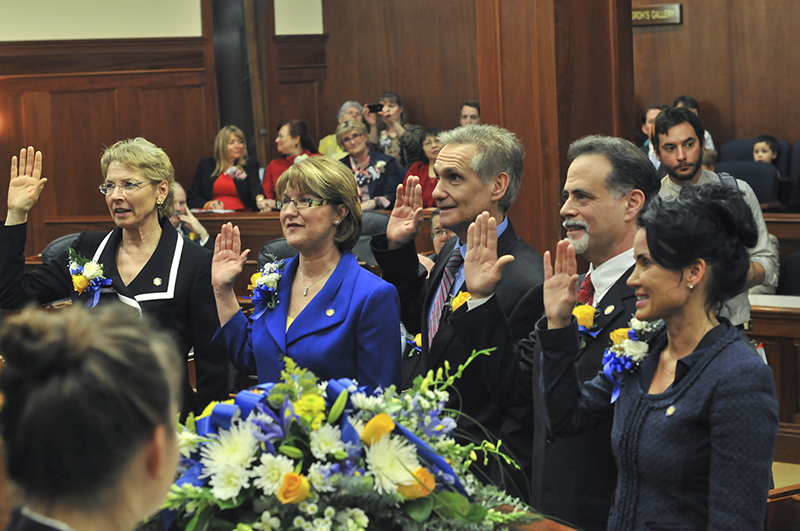
Giessel (left) being sworn in at the opening of the 28th Alaska State Legislature. Alaska legislators are typically sworn in on opening day in groups of five; to Giessel's left are Anna Fairclough, Kevin Meyer, Peter Micciche, and Lesil McGuire.

Though elected in 2010 to serve a four-year term, redistricting led to her being up for election again in 2012 for a new senate seat serving District N. In the August Republican primary, Giessel defeated challenger Joe Arness by 67%. She won the November general election, defeating Independent Ron Devon, the husband of Mudflats author Jeanne Devon, 58.8% to 40.7%. Her campaign positions were pro natural resource development, in-state gasline development, increased economic development, and oil tax reform. Increasing oil production through oil tax reform was a decisive issue during the 2012 election and became a top priority for the new senate majority caucus which was formed.

Giessel was appointed to chair the Senate Resources committee which moved Governor Parnell's oil tax reform legislation and advanced the Alaska Stand-Alone Pipeline project.

==== Committee assignments ====
- Resources (chair)
- Community and Regional Affairs (vice-chair)
- State Affairs (vice-chair)
- Administrative Regulatory Review (vice-chair)
- Legislative Budget and Audit
- Legislative Ethics
- Alaska Arctic Policy Commission
- Finance Subcommittee
  - Environmental Conservation
  - Natural Resources
  - Labor & Workforce Development

==== Caucus memberships ====
- In-state Gas Caucus
- Outdoor Heritage Caucus

=== 2010: Senate District P election ===
Giessel ran for the Senate District P seat in 2010 when Republican incumbent Con Bunde retired after 18 years in the legislature, the last eight in the Senate. She faced two moderates in her party primary: Anchorage assemblywoman Jennifer Johnston and cardiologist Mark Moronell. Taking advantage of the split in the moderate vote she won her party's nomination for the general election – 46% over 28% for Moronell and 25% for Johnston. The Alaska Dispatch, referred to the district election "as (what seems to be) the most important legislative race this year." Giessel identified herself with Tea Party ideals but did not consider herself a Tea Party candidate. In the November election, she beat Democrat Janet Reiser and independent conservative Phil Dziubinski 49% to 39% and 12% respectively. Dziubinski, who had recently retired from a career working for BP, spent over $150,000 of his own money on his campaign.

During her freshman term, Giessel served on the Senate committees on labor & commerce, state affairs, the finance subcommittee on the legislature, and was a member of the Joint In-State Gas Caucus. She aligned herself with the 'Senate Minority' caucus: a grouping of Republican senators who rejected the dominant bipartisan 'Senate Majority' caucus.

==== Committee assignments ====
- Senate Committee on Labor and Commerce
- Senate Committee on State Affairs
- Senate Finance subcommittee on the Legislature

==== Caucus memberships ====
- Joint Legislative In-State Gas Caucus
- Joint Legislative Outdoor Heritage Caucus
- Anchorage Caucus

== Political positions ==
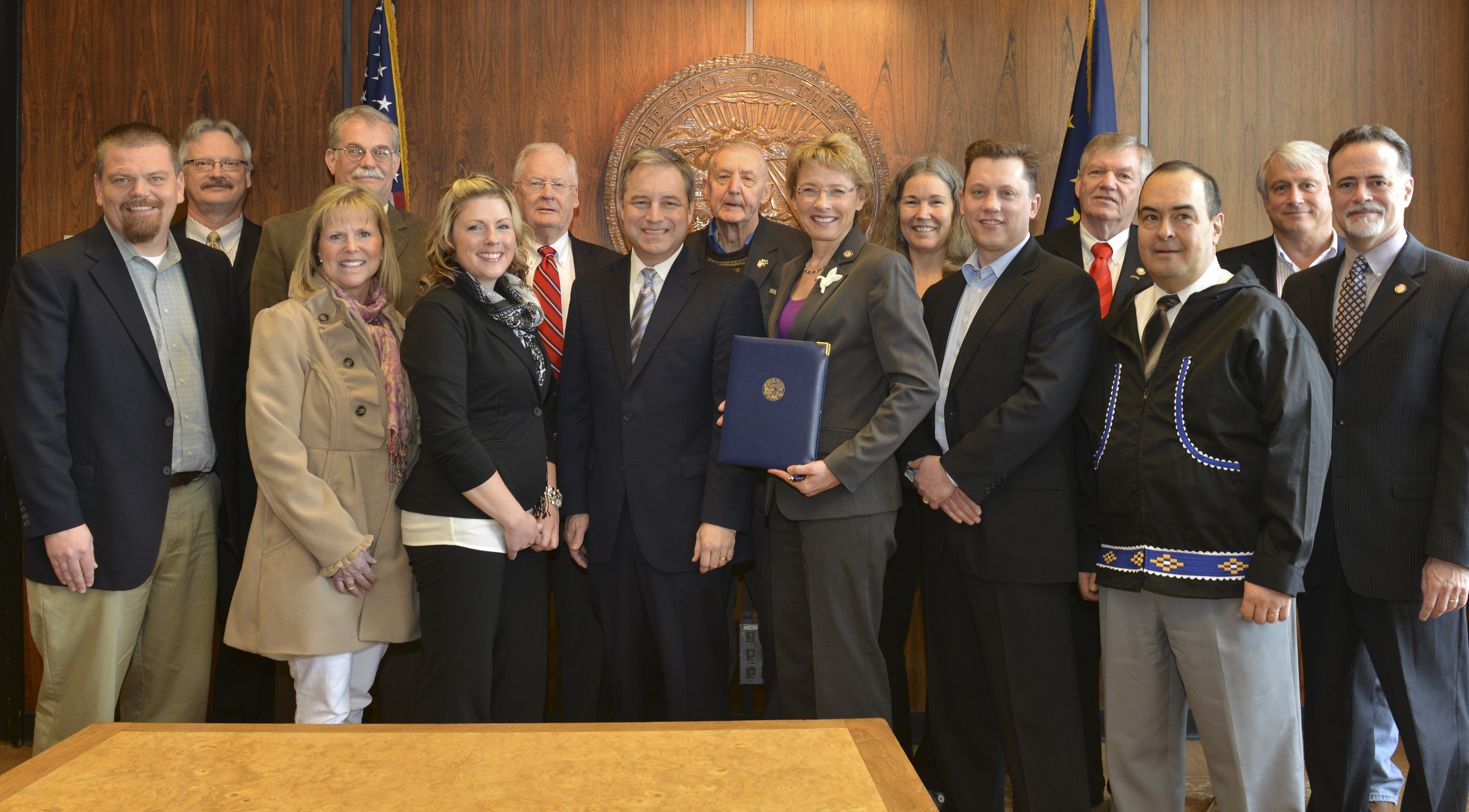
Alaska Mining Day bill signing ceremony: Giessel with Governor Sean Parnell, Senate President Charlie Huggins, Micciche, Donald Olson and mining industry representatives.

In a 2010 response to a questionnaire sent by the Alaska Family Action group, Giessel conveyed pro-life viewpoints, constitutional limits on benefits for same-sex couples and legislative blocks on the expansion of gambling excepting a referendum. Since then however Giessel has joined Democrats in opposition to policies seeking to reduce or eliminate abortion.

In the 2011 mid-term Alaska Business Report Card (a grading system run by several Alaska business coalitions judging state officials on how favorable they are to the business community). Giessel received an A+, the only senator to receive the highest grade, and only one of five state legislators in both houses.

== National involvement ==
In 2013, Giessel was appointed to chair the Energy Producing States Coalition (EPSC), a bipartisan group of legislators across 10 states that focuses on energy and transmission development issues. After a decision by the Interior Department to withhold $110 million in federal mineral revenue sharing payments because of sequestration, the EPSC issued a letter to the House Energy and Commerce Committee leadership denouncing the act, to which Giessel signed.

== Personal life ==
Giessel and Richard Giessel are married and they have three children and several grandchildren. She is a member of the National Rifle Association of America–which has endorsed her run for re-election and the Second Amendment Sisters. She received the Anchorage Republican Woman of the Year award in 2007.

Political offices
| Preceded by Pete Kelly | President of the Alaska Senate; 2019–2021 | Succeeded by Peter Micciche |
Alaska Senate
| Preceded by Shelley Hughes | Majority Leader of the Alaska Senate; 2023–present | Incumbent |
