= Roger Holland =

American politician

Roger D. Holland is an American politician from Alaska. He served as a member of the Alaska Senate, representing district N from 2021 to 2023. He defeated longtime incumbent Cathy Giessel in the 2020 primary election. In the 2022 Alaska Senate election, Holland was defeated by Giessel in a rematch.
