= Peter Micciche =

American politician (born 1961)

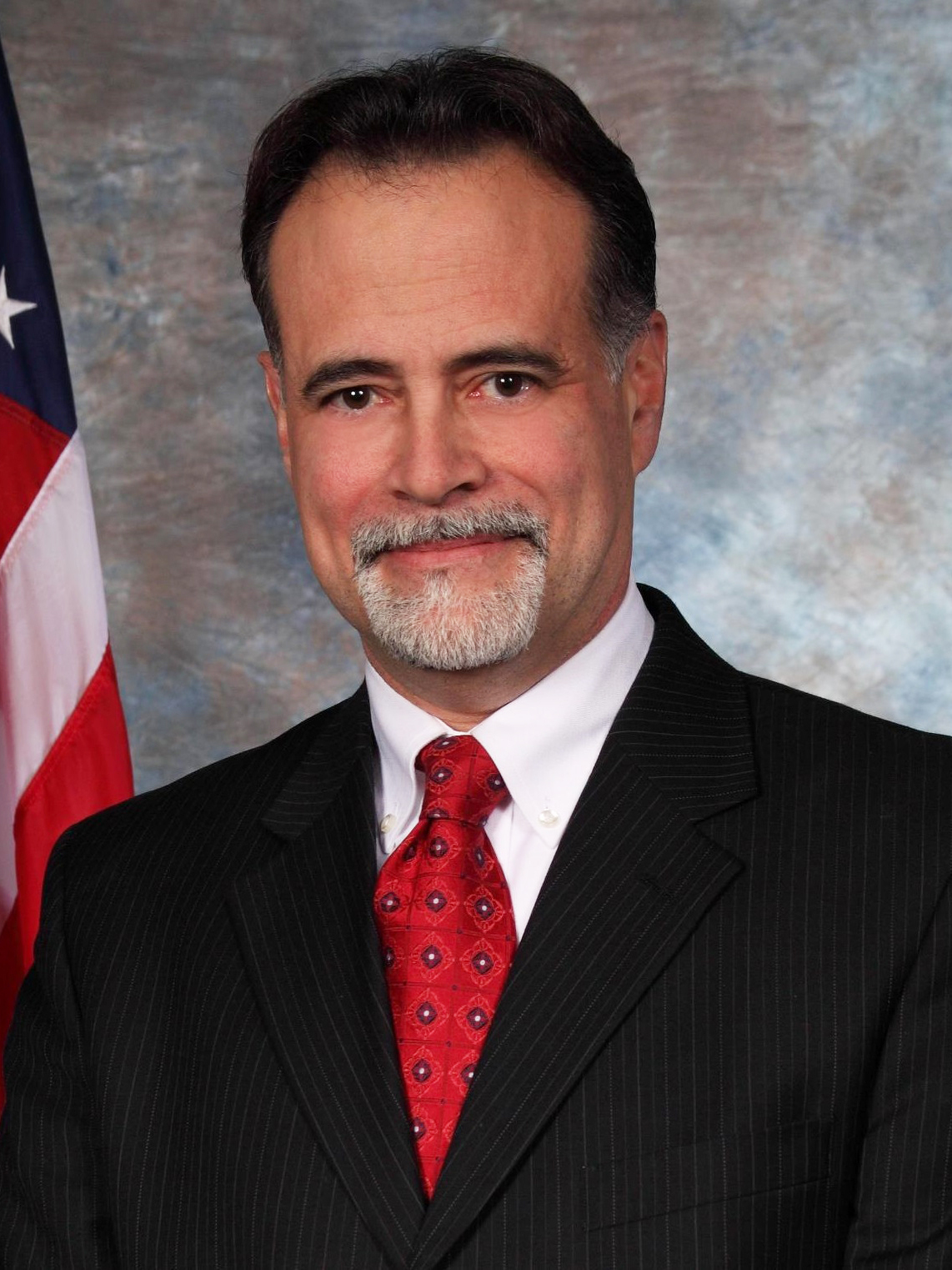
- Official portrait, 2014

Mayor of Kenai Peninsula Borough
- Incumbent
- Assumed office February 27, 2023
- Preceded by: Charlie Peirce

President of the Alaska Senate
- In office January 19, 2021 – January 13, 2023
- Preceded by: Cathy Giessel
- Succeeded by: Gary Stevens

Majority Leader of the Alaska Senate
- In office January 17, 2017 – January 15, 2019
- Preceded by: John Coghill
- Succeeded by: Mia Costello

Member of the Alaska Senate from the O district
- In office January 15, 2013 – January 13, 2023
- Preceded by: Thomas Wagoner (district Q)
- Succeeded by: Jesse Bjorkman

Personal details
- Born: December 17, 1961 (age 64) Valley Stream, New York, U.S.
- Party: Republican
- Spouse: Erin Micciche
- Children: 4
- Education: University of Alaska, Anchorage; Alaska Pacific University (BA)

Peter A. Micciche (/məˈtʃɪki/ mə-CHIK-ee; born December 17, 1961) is an American politician and a Republican member of the Alaska Senate since January 15, 2013, and before January 13, 2023 representing District O. Micciche was previously the mayor of Soldotna, Alaska, and a member of its city council.

== Education ==
Micciche earned an associate degree from Kenai Peninsula College at the University of Alaska, Anchorage and his BA in business management from Alaska Pacific University.

== Elections ==
Micciche challenged the long-time incumbent Senator Tom Wagoner (redistricted from District Q) for the District O August 28, 2012, Republican primary and won with 3,963 votes (58.62%). Micciche was unopposed for the November 6, 2012, general election and won with 12,947 votes (94.61%) against write-in candidates.

== Tenure ==
Micciche served as the Majority Leader from 2017 to 2018. Micciche has served as the President of the Alaska State Senate since 2021.

He has served as the chair on the Alaska Senate's Committee of Committees since 2021. He previously chaired the Senate's Resources Committee (2019-2021), Public Safety & Military and Veterans' Affairs committees (2017-2019), Health & Social Services Committee (2015-2019), Transportation Committee (2015-2017), and the Community & Regional Affairs Committee (2013-2015)

His current senate district, District O, is based in the northern regions of the Kenai Peninsula, south of the Anchorage City-borough. Its largest city is Kenai. However, following 2020 redistricting, as of January 17, 2023, the new district based around the same territory will be labelled District D.

Alaska Senate
Preceded by John Coghill	Majority Leader of the Alaska Senate; 2017–2019	Succeeded by Mia Costello
Political offices
Preceded by Cathy Giessel	President of the Alaska Senate; 2021–2023	Succeeded by Gary Stevens
