= Joe Paskvan =

American politician

Member of the Alaska Senate from the E district
- In office January 20, 2009 – January 15, 2013
- Preceded by: Gary Wilken
- Succeeded by: redistricted

Personal details
- Born: May 19, 1952 (age 74) Fairbanks, Alaska, U.S.
- Party: Democratic
- Spouse: Barbara Tritt
- Children: Nicole; Chelsea; Tom; Ryan
- Education: University of Alaska, Fairbanks; University of Puget Sound

Joseph L. Paskvan (born May 19, 1952) is an attorney and a former Democratic member of the Alaska Senate. He represented the residents of District E, which includes the entire city limits of Fairbanks and several neighborhoods just outside, from 2009 through 2012.

Joe Paskvan was born in Fairbanks, Alaska, where he has lived his entire life save for a several year period during law school. He graduated from Monroe High School in 1970. His father, Tom Paskvan, after obtaining benefits through the GI Bill, opened a bar called the Elbow Room on Second Avenue in Fairbanks in 1947. The Elbow Room remained in business through subsequent owners until 2003. Joe was manager of the bar from 1973 to 1978. He earned a B.A. in political science from the University of Alaska Fairbanks in 1975, and a Juris Doctor from the University of Puget Sound School of Law in 1981.

Paskvan had an internship in 1981 under Judge Alexander O. Bryner of the Alaska Court of Appeals, the year after the court was established. He worked for the law firm of Rice, Hoppner, Brown, & Brunner until 1986, when he started his own partnership, Paskvan & Ringstad PC.

He was elected in November 2008 to an open seat, as incumbent Gary Wilken retired after 3 terms. In the general election, he defeated Cynthia Henry, a gift shop owner who served on both the Fairbanks North Star Borough Assembly and the University of Alaska Board of Regents.

On November 6, 2012, Paskvan lost his general election bid to Pete Kelly.
