= Scott Kawasaki =

American politician (born 1975)

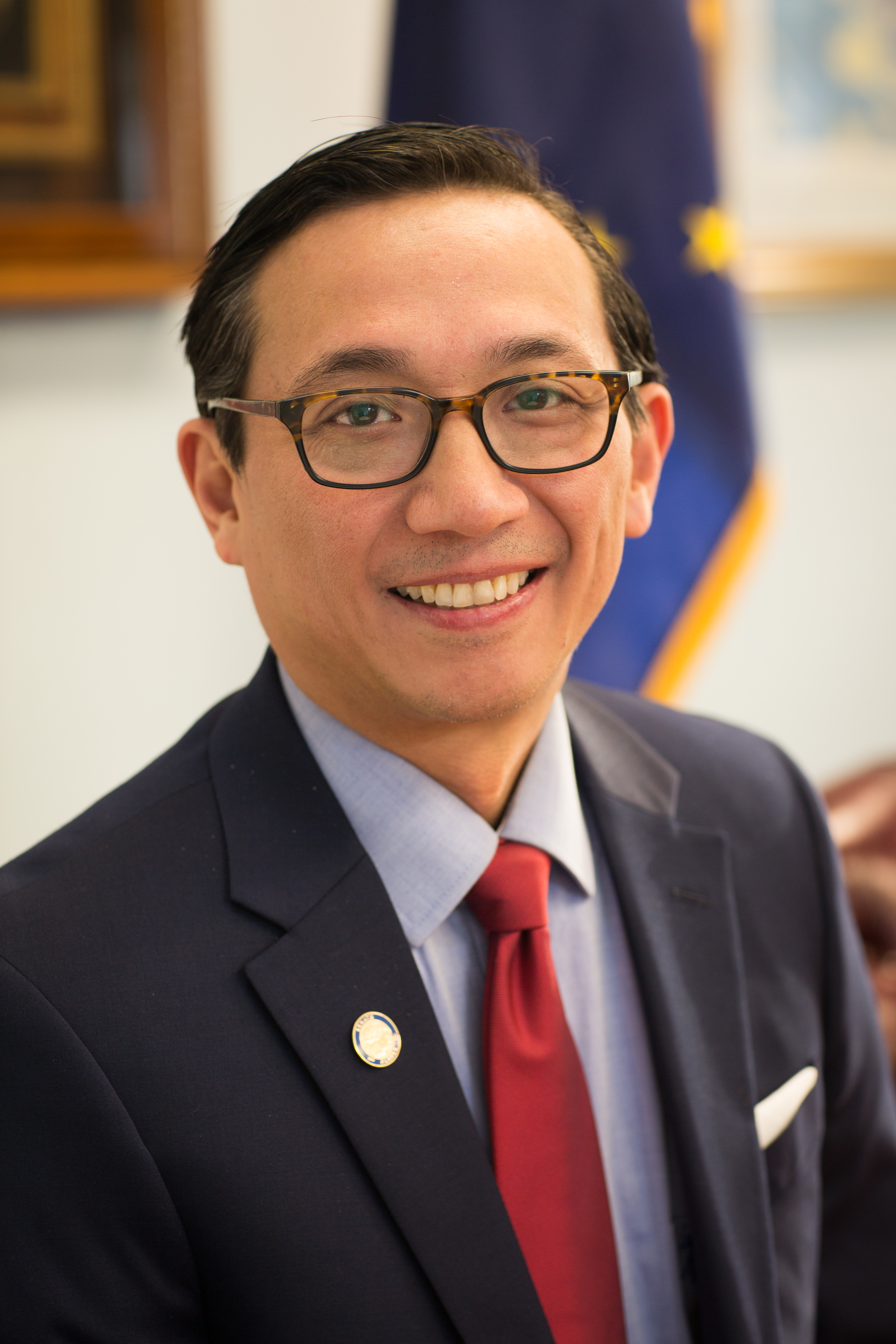
- Official portrait, 2019

Member of the Alaska Senate
- Incumbent
- Assumed office January 15, 2019
- Preceded by: Pete Kelly
- Constituency: District A (2019–2023); District P (2023–present)

Member of the Alaska House of Representatives
- In office January 16, 2007 – January 15, 2019
- Preceded by: Jim Holm
- Succeeded by: Bart LeBon
- Constituency: District 9 (2007–2013); District 4 (2013–2015); District 1 (2015–2019)

Personal details
- Born: Scott Jiu Wo Kawasaki; March 20, 1975 (age 51) Tokyo, Japan
- Party: Democratic
- Education: University of Alaska, Fairbanks (BS)

Scott Jiu Wo Kawasaki (born March 20, 1975) is an American healthcare professional and politician from Alaska. A Democrat, he is a member of the Alaska Senate representing the state's District P, which includes neighborhoods within the city limits of Fairbanks.

== Early life and education ==
Scott Kawasaki was born in Tokyo, Japan while his parents Koji and Virginia Kawasaki taught internationally. The family returned to Fairbanks in 1980, where he has lived ever since. Kawasaki attended public schools in Fairbanks before earning a Bachelor of Science in Biomedical Sciences from the University of Alaska Fairbanks in 2006.

== Career ==
Kawasaki was elected to the Fairbanks City Council in 1999. At age 24, he was one of the youngest members ever to serve on that body. He served on the Fairbanks City Council for two consecutive terms from 1999 till 2005.

Kawasaki was elected state representative for House District 9, in 2006, defeating Republican incumbent Jim Holm by 2617 votes (55 percent) to 2118 (45 percent). He had previously run in 2004, losing to Holm by 52 votes.

Kawasaki was reelected in 2008 defeating Republican challenger Sue Hull. He was the youngest member of the legislature at that time. Kawasaki defeated Republican nominee Joseph Michel in the 2010 election. In 2012, in District 4, he narrowly beat David Pruhs, with 51-47% of the vote.

In 2014, he beat Gregory Bringhurst with 55% of the tally, and was unopposed in 2016. Prior to the appointment of Sam Kito III in 2014, Kawasaki was the only Asian American currently serving in the Alaska Legislature.

Kawasaki ran against incumbent Senator Pete Kelly in 2018, winning with 50.79% of the vote. The Fairbanks-North Star Borough Assembly's Presiding Officer Kathryn Dodge filed to run as a Democrat for the House seat Kawasaki had held. She lost by one vote.

== Electoral history ==
Nonpartisan primary
Party	Candidate	Votes	%
Republican	Leslie Hajdukovich	1,764	51.35
Democratic	Scott Kawasaki (incumbent)	1,671	48.65
Total votes		3,435	100.0

2024 Alaska Senate General election
Party	Candidate	Votes	%
Democratic	Scott Kawasaki (incumbent)	5,913	51.39
Republican	Leslie Hajdukovich	5,561	48.33
Write-in		32	0.28
Total votes		11,506	100.0
Democratic hold			
Coalition hold			
