= Pete Kelly (Alaska politician) =

American politician

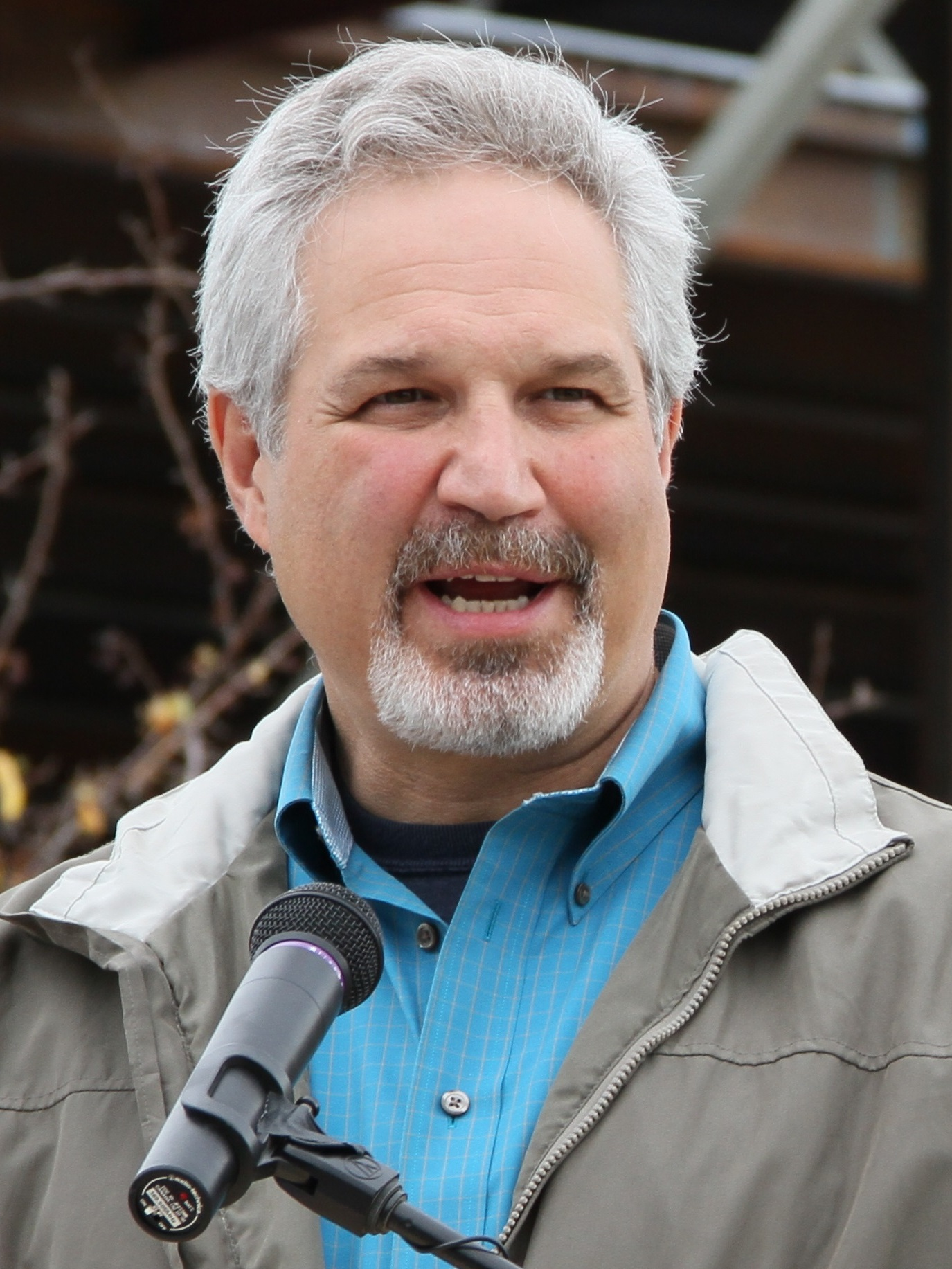
- Kelly in 2014

President of the Alaska Senate
- In office January 17, 2017 – January 15, 2019
- Preceded by: Kevin Meyer
- Succeeded by: Cathy Giessel

Member of the Alaska Senate from the A district B district (2013–2015)
- In office January 15, 2013 – January 15, 2019
- Preceded by: Redistricted
- Succeeded by: Scott Kawasaki

Member of the Alaska Senate from the P district
- In office January 19, 1999 – January 21, 2003
- Preceded by: Bert Sharp
- Succeeded by: Redistricted

Member of the Alaska House of Representatives from the 31 district
- In office January 16, 1995 – January 19, 1999
- Preceded by: Joe Sitton
- Succeeded by: Jim Whitaker

Personal details
- Born: Peter Gene Kelly; June 3, 1956 (age 70) Fairbanks, Alaska, U.S.
- Party: Republican
- Spouse: Perri Kelly
- Relations: Mike Kelly (brother; deceased)
- Children: 3
- Education: Liberty University (BS)
- Website: State Senate website

Peter Gene Kelly (born June 3, 1956) is an American politician who served as a member of the Alaska Senate. He also served as President of the Alaska State Senate from 2017 to 2019. Kelly previously served in the Alaska Legislature in the Alaska House of Representatives and Senate from 1995 until 2003. He was defeated for re-election in 2018, losing to state representative Scott Kawasaki.

== Early life and education ==
Peter Gene Kelly was born in Fairbanks, Alaska on June 3, 1956, the youngest of seven children of Halford "Hal" and Helen Kelly. He has lived in Fairbanks for most of his life, and graduated from Monroe Catholic High School in 1974. His oldest brother was Mike Kelly. Mike died in a plane crash on December 7, 2016.

Kelly attended University of Alaska Fairbanks and earned his BS in business administration from Liberty University.

== Career ==
In 1994, Kelly was unopposed in the House District 31 August 23, 1994 Republican primary, winning with 768 votes. He challenged incumbent Democratic Representative Joe Sitton in the general election. Kelly won the three-way November 8, 1994 general election with 2,269 votes (49.9%) against Sitton and Fairbanks Republican candidate Walt Johnson.

In 1996, Kelly was unopposed in the August 27, 1996 Republican primary. He won with 1,986 votes, and went on to win the November 5, 1996 general election with 3,262 votes (66.5%) against Democratic nominee Erik Holland.

In 1998, when Republican Senator Bert Sharp retired and left the District P seat open, Kelly won the August 25, 1998 Republican primary, receiving 2,107 votes against District 32 Representative Al Vezey. Kelly won the November 3, 1998 general election with 5,082 votes (61.80%) against Democratic nominee Jane Haigh.

Kelly was unopposed for the District B August 28, 2012 Republican primary, winning with 2,386 votes. He faced incumbent Democratic Senator Joe Paskvan (redistricted from District E) in the general election; Kelly won the November 6, 2012 contest with 6,232 votes (54.11%).

Political offices
Preceded by Kevin Meyer	President of the Alaska Senate; 2017–2019	Succeeded by Cathy Giessel
