= Alaska Senate district R =

Alaskan legislative district

Alaska's R State Senate district
Senator
Mike Cronk; R–Fairbanks
since 2025
- Population: 36,718

Alaska Senate district R is one of 20 districts of the Alaska Senate. It has been represented by Republican Mike Cronk since 2025. District R is located in The Bush and encompasses the entirety of Alaska's 35th House of Representatives district and 36th House of Representatives district, including the Yukon–Koyukuk Census Area, Southeast Fairbanks Census Area, and Copper River Census Area.

From 2013 to 2022, the district covered portions of Ketchikan Gateway Borough, Prince of Wales-Hyder Census Area, Sitka, Wrangell, Petersburg, and Hoonah–Angoon Census Area - these areas are now encompassed by district A.

== Election results (2022 boundaries) ==
=== 2024 ===
Nonpartisan primary
Party	Candidate	Votes	%
Republican	Mike Cronk	3,305	43.8
Independent	Savannah Fletcher (Note: Listed on the ballot as "Undeclared")	3,193	42.3
Republican	James Squyres (withdrew)	572	7.6
Independence	Robert Williams	481	6.4
Total votes		7,551	100.0

General election
Party	Candidate	Votes	%
Republican	Mike Cronk	9,387	51.84
Independent	Savannah Fletcher	7,509	41.47
Independence	Robert Williams	1,157	6.39
Write-in		56	0.31
Total votes		18,109	100.0
Republican hold			
Minority Caucus gain from Coalition			

=== 2022 ===
Nonpartisan primary
Party	Candidate	Votes	%
Republican	Click Bishop (incumbent)	5,736	56.9
Republican	Elijah Verhagen	2,543	25.2
Independence	Bert Williams	1,805	17.9
Total votes		10,084	100.00

General election
Party	Candidate	Votes	%
Republican	Click Bishop (incumbent)	8,297	56.7
Republican	Elijah Verhagen	3,957	27.1
Independence	Bert Williams	2,275	15.6
Write-in	Write-ins	95	0.6
Total votes		14,624	100.0
Republican hold			

== Election results (2013 boundaries) ==
Map of District R of the Alaska Senate from 2013 to 2022

=== 2020 ===
Republican primary
Party	Candidate	Votes	%
Republican	Bert Stedman (incumbent)	1,926	63.8
Republican	Michael Sheldon	1,092	36.2
Total votes		3,018	100.0

General election
Party	Candidate	Votes	%
Republican	Bert Stedman (incumbent)	14,578	93.7
Write-in	Write-ins	985	6.3
Total votes		15,563	100.0
Republican hold			

=== 2016 ===
Republican primary
Party	Candidate	Votes	%
Republican	Bert Stedman (incumbent)	1,989	100.0
Total votes		1,989	100

General election
Party	Candidate	Votes	%
Republican	Bert Stedman (incumbent)	12,882	95.73
Write-ins	Write-ins	574	4.27
Total votes		13,456	100
Republican hold			

== Election results (2012 boundaries) ==
Map of District R of the Alaska Senate from 2012 to 2013

=== 2012 ===
Republican primary
Party	Candidate	Votes	%
Republican	Gary Stevens (incumbent)	2,205	100.0
Total votes		2,205	100

Democratic primary
Party	Candidate	Votes	%
Democratic	Robert Henrichs	1,652	100.0
Total votes		1,652	100

General election
Party	Candidate	Votes	%
Republican	Gary Stevens (incumbent)	7,673	69.76
Democratic	Robert Henrichs	3,277	29.79
Write-ins	Write-ins	49	0.45
Total votes		10,999	100
Republican hold			
