= Robert Myers Jr. =

American politician (born 1983)

Robert Myers

Member of the Alaska Senate
- Incumbent
- Assumed office January 19, 2021
- Preceded by: John Coghill
- Constituency: District B (2021–2023); District Q (2023–present)

Personal details
- Born: August 15, 1983 (age 43) Fairbanks, Alaska, U.S.
- Party: Republican
- Spouse: Dawna
- Children: 5
- Education: University of Alaska, Fairbanks (BA)

Robert Myers Jr. (born 1983) is an American politician serving as a member of the Alaska Senate for the Q district, which includes North Pole and other parts of the Fairbanks North Star Borough.

== Early life and education ==
Born in Fairbanks, Alaska, Myers graduated from West Valley High School in Fairbanks and from the University of Alaska Fairbanks, where he earned a Bachelor of Arts degree in philosophy in 2007.

== Career ==
Myers briefly worked as an intern in the Alaska Legislature before becoming a truck driver and tour bus operator. In 2020, he successfully ran for state senate, defeating longtime incumbent John Coghill by 14 votes in the Republican primary election. He went on to defeat independents Marna Sanford and Evan Eads in the general election.

== Personal life ==
Married to Dawna Myers, they have five children.
