= John Coghill =

American politician (born 1950)

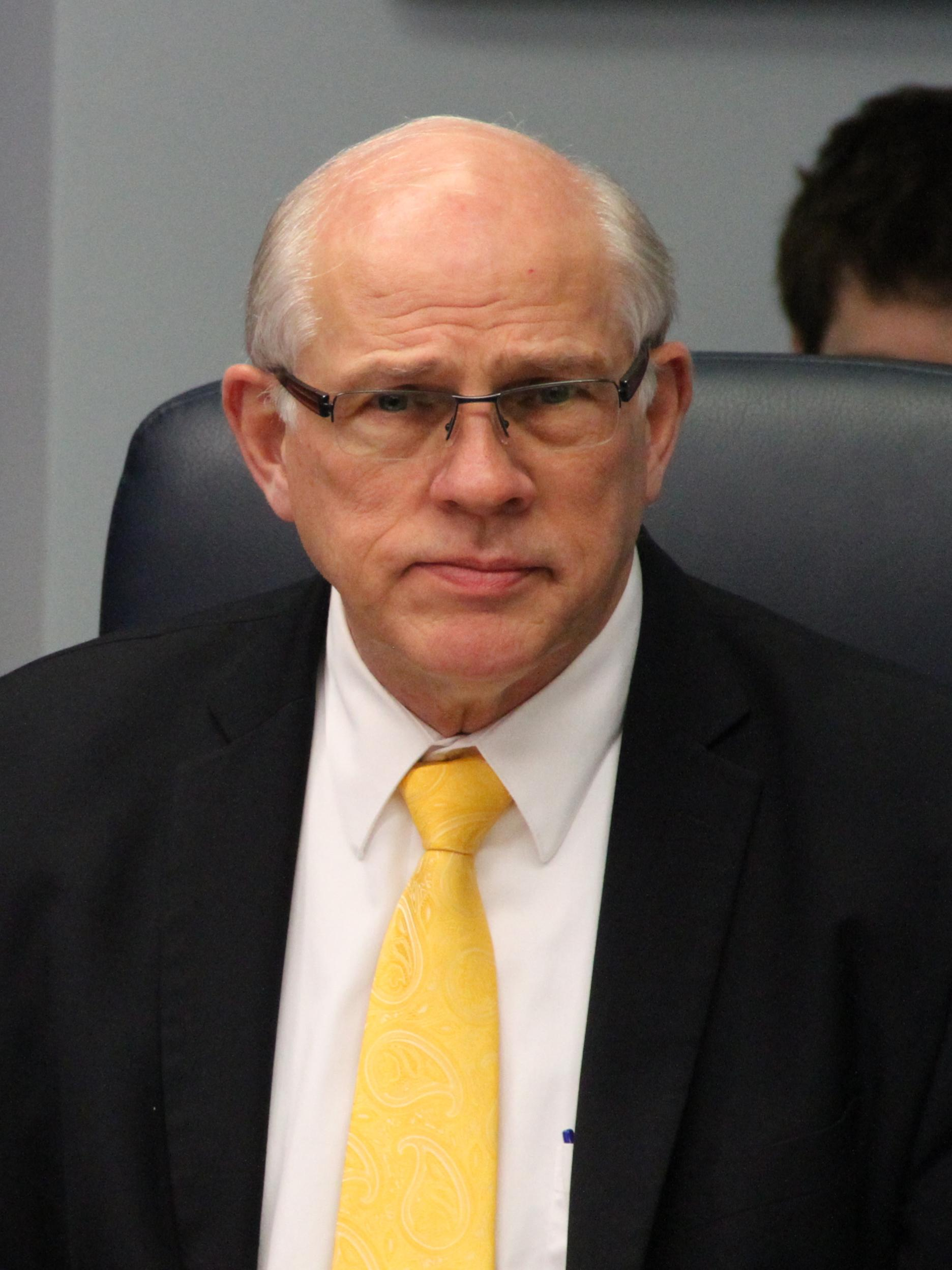
- Coghill in 2018

Member of the Alaska Senate
- In office October 27, 2009 – January 18, 2021
- Preceded by: Gene Therriault
- Succeeded by: Robert Myers Jr.
- Constituency: F District (2009-2013); A District (2013-2017); B District (2017-2021)

Member of the Alaska House of Representatives from the 11th district
- In office January 19, 1999 – October 27, 2009
- Preceded by: Al Vezey
- Succeeded by: Tammie Wilson

Personal details
- Born: August 15, 1950 (age 75) Fairbanks, Alaska, U.S.
- Party: Republican
- Spouse: Luann
- Children: 3
- Education: University of Alaska, Fairbanks

John Bruce Coghill Jr. (born August 15, 1950) is an American politician who served as a member of the Alaska Senate, representing North Pole and other communities in the Fairbanks North Star Borough. First elected to the Alaska House of Representatives in 1998, he was appointed to his Senate seat in 2009 and was the Senate's majority leader from 2013 to 2016. During his Senate tenure, he served as Rules Committee chairman. In 2020, he lost re-election by 14 votes to fellow Republican Robert Myers Jr., who defeated him in the state's Republican primary election.

== Early life ==
John Bruce Coghill Jr. was born on August 15, 1950, in Fairbanks, Territory of Alaska, to Frances Mae "Frannie" (née Gilbert) and John Bruce "Jack" Coghill, residents of nearby Nenana. His paternal grandfather, William Alexander Coghill (1884–1947), was an English-born Scotsman who came to Alaska by way of Canada, settling first in Fairbanks and then in Nenana in the early years of both communities. He was raised in Nenana before moving to Fairbanks to attend the University of Alaska Fairbanks. He was drafted into the United States Air Force during his first semester in attendance. He served for five years in the Air Force during the Vietnam War era, reaching the rank of staff sergeant.

== Career ==
Coghill served as the majority leader for the Alaska State House of Representatives from 2003 to 2006. He was also on the Alaska Information Infrastructure Task Force during 2005 and 2006. He was additionally involved in the Local Government Advisory Commission during 2005 and 2006. Coghill was the Minority Leader in 2012 and the Majority Leader from 2013 through 2016. Over the years, including in 2017–2018, Coghill was either Chair or a member of the Senate Judiciary Committee.

As Senate Majority Leader, Coghill supported bills regarding life insurance reform (SB15), boundaries of road service areas (SB19), and firefighter and fire department protections (SB43), all of which passed in 2015, and supported the bills "Paramedic on State Medical Board" (SB 14), "Healthcare Sharing Ministries" (SB 18), "Omnibus Criminal Justice Reform Package" (SB 91), and "Tribal Court Criminal Procedure" (SB 117) in 2016.

Coghill worked to regulate the use of marijuana in Alaska, which was legalized in 2014. He worked on criminal justice reform, an energy interior project, and addressing what he contended was "Federal Overreach".

Coghill has been a long-time advocate on anti-abortion issues. A bill he introduced in 2015 would have forbidden the state to pay for any services save for those explicitly necessary to save the life of the pregnant female.

He has been a member of the Citizens Advisory Commission on Federal Areas.

=== Committee assignments ===
Coghill held a co-chair in the Joint Armed Services Committee Member during 2005 and 2006 and the Health, Education & Social Services Committee from 1999 to 2000. He also was the vice-chair in the Special Committee on Military & Veterans’ Affairs from 1999 to 2000. Coghill then held a chair in the House State Affairs Committee from 2001 to 2002. He was also part of the Special Committee on Fisheries during 2001 and 2002. Coghill was involved in the Health, Education & Social Services Committee from 2001 to 2004. He additionally served in the House Judiciary Committee from 2001 to 2009. Coghill was on the Special Committee on Education in 2003. He was involved in the State Affairs Committee in 2003 and 2004. He was also part of the Legislative Council Joint Committee during 2003 to 2009. Coghill has been involved in the Rules Committee from 2003 to modern day. He was on the Special Committee on Economic Development, International Trade, and Tourism from 2005 to 2006. He held a chair in the House Rules Committee from 2007 to 2009. Coghill was a Senate Member of Select Committee on Legislative Ethics from 2010 to 2012. He was a Senate Judiciary committee member from 2010 to 2012, and chaired it from 2013 to 2015. (entire paragraph)

==== Finance subcommittees ====
Coghill was part of the Military & Veterans’ Affairs financial sub-committee in 1999 and 2000; the Natural Resources financial sub-committee from 1999 to 2006; the Early Education and Early Development financial sub-committee during 2001 and 2002; the Health and Social Services financial sub-committee from 2001 to 2006; the Legislature financial sub-committee from 2003 to 2006; and the Governor financial sub-committee from 2003 to 2006.

== Personal life ==
Coghill is married to Luann Coghill, and has three children and seven grandchildren. Coghill graduated from Nenana Public High School with his high school diploma in 1968.
