= Bert Stedman =

American politician

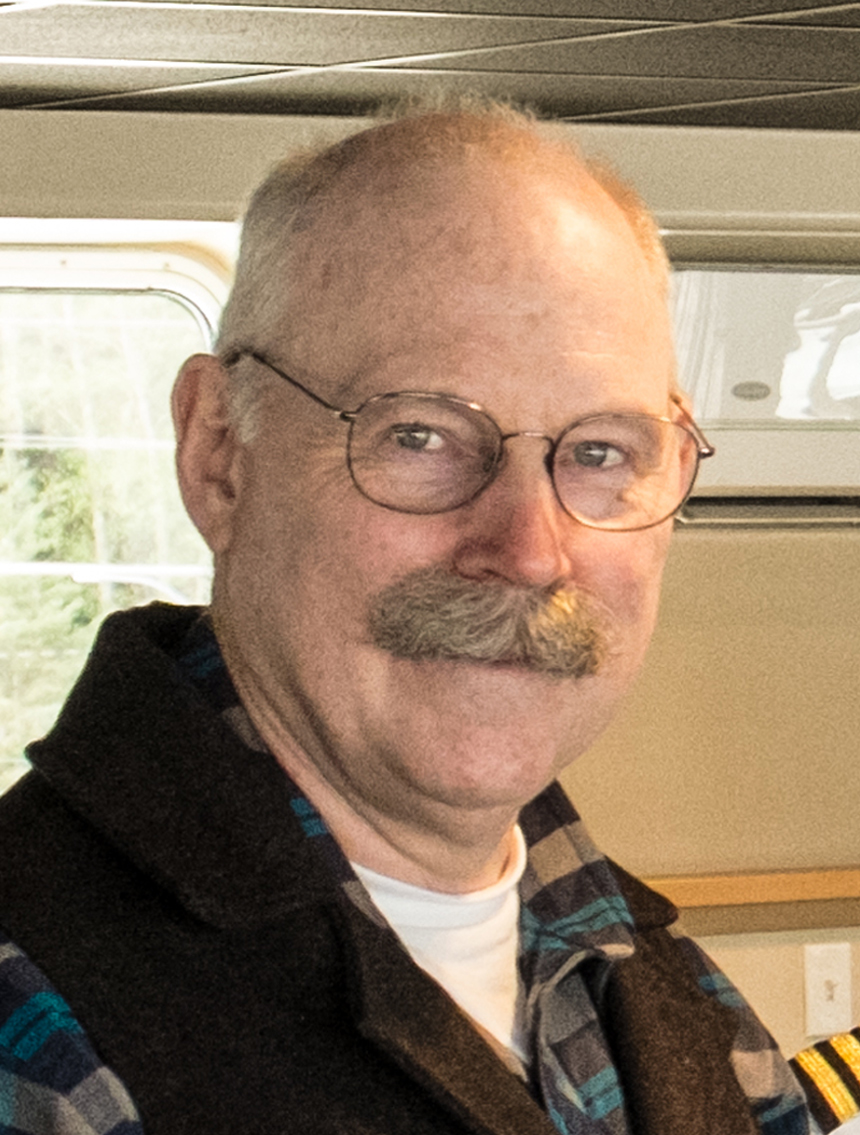
- Stedman in 2019

Member of the Alaska Senate
- Incumbent
- Assumed office November 20, 2003
- Preceded by: Robin L. Taylor
- Constituency: A (2003–13); Q (2013-15); R (2015-23); A (since 2023)

Personal details
- Born: March 6, 1956 (age 70) Anchorage, Territory of Alaska
- Party: Republican
- Spouse: Lureen
- Children: Susan
- Education: University of Oregon
- Profession: Financial services
- Website: http://bertstedman.com

Bert Stedman (born March 6, 1956) is an American politician who has been a Republican member of the Alaska Senate since 2003.

== Life ==
A fourth generation Alaskan, he was born in Anchorage and spent his childhood between Petersburg and Sitka. He was appointed by Governor Frank Murkowski in November 2003 to the Alaska Senate. Stedman currently represents many communities in Southeast Alaska, including Ketchikan, Sitka, Petersburg, Wrangell, and Yakutat.

Stedman co-chaired the Senate Finance Committee for six years from 2007 to 2012, and again in 2019. Politically heterodox, Stedman opposed reforms to Alaska's oil tax under Republican governors Sarah Palin and Sean Parnell. Following the precipitous drop in oil prices, Stedman advocated a more fiscally conservative approach to the state's budgeting in 2015.
