= Gary Stevens (politician) =

American politician

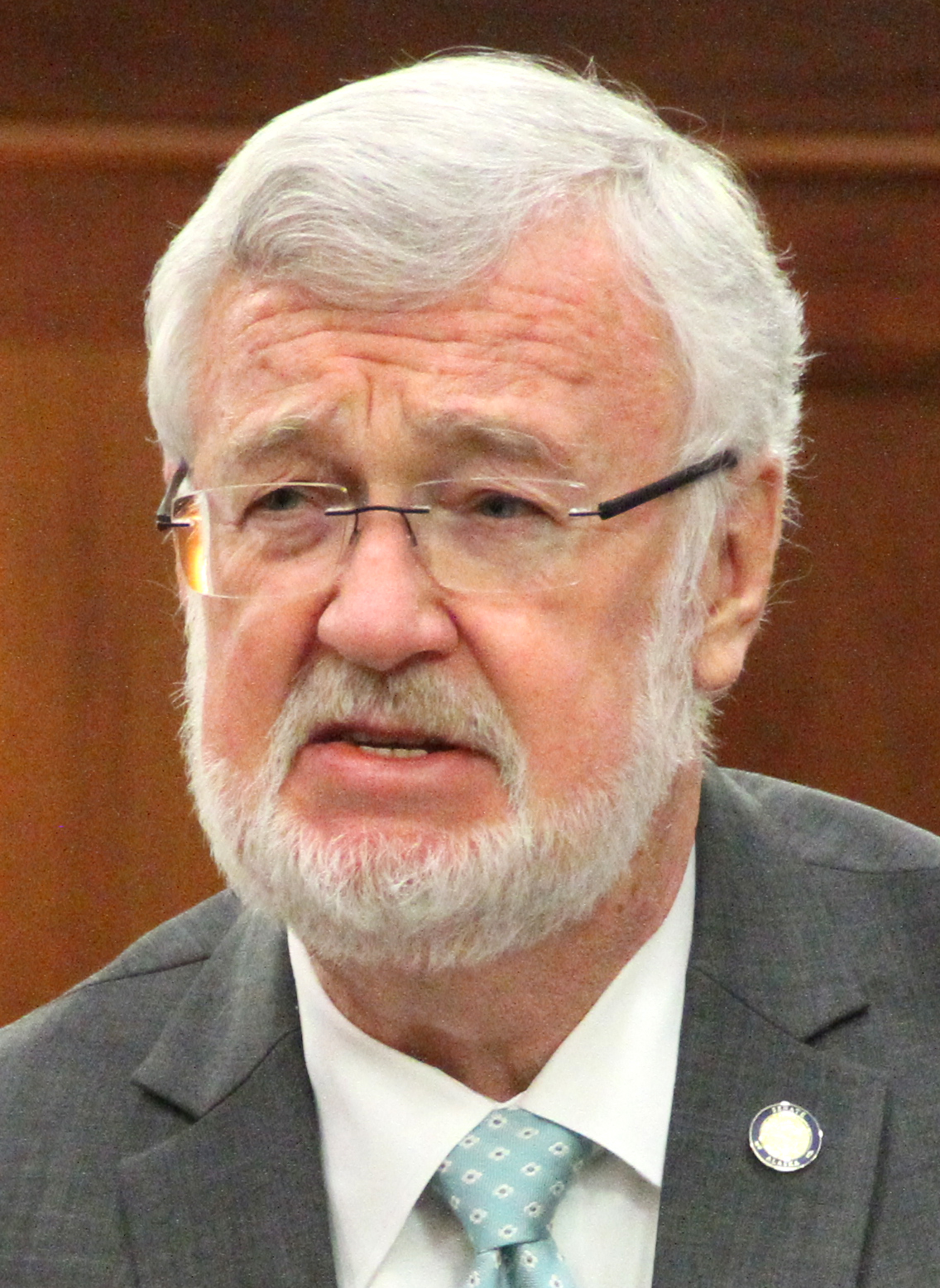

President of the Alaska Senate
- Incumbent
- Assumed office January 17, 2023
- Preceded by: Peter Micciche
- In office January 20, 2009 – January 15, 2013
- Preceded by: Lyda Green
- Succeeded by: Charlie Huggins

Majority Leader of the Alaska Senate
- In office January 17, 2005 – January 19, 2009
- Preceded by: Ben Stevens
- Succeeded by: Johnny Ellis

Member of the Alaska Senate
- Incumbent
- Assumed office February 19, 2003
- Preceded by: Alan Austerman
- Constituency: R (2003-15); P (2015-23); C (since 2023)

Member of the Alaska House of Representatives
- In office January 8, 2001 – February 19, 2003
- Preceded by: Alan Austerman
- Succeeded by: Dan Ogg
- Constituency: 6 (2001-03), 36 (2003)

Personal details
- Born: August 21, 1941 (age 84) McMinnville, Oregon, U.S.
- Party: Republican
- Spouse: Rita
- Education: Linfield University (BA); University of Oregon (MFA, PhD)

Gary Lee Stevens (born August 21, 1941) is a Republican member of the Alaska Senate since his appointment in February 2003. Stevens represents Kodiak Island, the southern Kenai Peninsula including Homer and Seward, and Cordova. He was previously a member of the Alaska House of Representatives from 2001 through 2003. Stevens is the current president of the Alaska Senate since 2023, an office he previously held from 2009 to 2013. In both of Stevens' terms as Senate president, he has led a bipartisan majority coalition of Democrats and Republicans. In 2023, he authored a play about former Alaskan senator Ted Stevens, "Uncle Ted".

== Education ==
- Linfield (College) University, B.A. 1959
- University of Oregon, M.F.A. 1961
- University of Oregon, Ph.D. 1982
- Harvard’s Kennedy School of Government, Leadership Certificate 2006 and 2018

Alaska Senate
Preceded by Ben Stevens	Majority Leader of the Alaska Senate; 2005—2009	Succeeded by Johnny Ellis
Political offices
Preceded by Lyda Green	President of the Alaska Senate; 2009—2013	Succeeded by Charlie Huggins
Preceded by Peter Micciche	President of the Alaska Senate; 2023–present	Incumbent
