= 29th Alaska State Legislature =

Term of state legislature in Alaska, US

←	28th Alaska State Legislature	30th Alaska State Legislature	→

Overview
- Legislative body: Alaska Legislature
- Jurisdiction: Alaska, United States
- Meeting place: Alaska State Capitol
- Term: January 20, 2015 - January 17, 2017

Alaska Senate
- Members: 20 Senators
- Senate President: Kevin Meyer (R)
- Majority Leader: John Coghill (R)
- Minority Leader: Berta Gardner (R)
- Party control: Republican

Alaska House of Representatives
- Members: 40 Representatives
- Speaker of the House: Mike Chenault (R)
- Majority Leader: Charisse Millett (R)
- Minority Leader: Chris Tuck (D)
- Party control: Republican

The 29th Alaska State Legislature represented the legislative branch of Alaska's state government from January 20, 2015 to January 17, 2017. Its 60-person membership was set by the 2014 Alaska elections.

== Senate ==
Alaska State Senate 29th Alaska Legislature (2015-2016)
District	Name	Party
A	Pete Kelly	Rep
B	John Coghill	Rep
C	Click Bishop	Rep
D	Charlie Huggins	Rep
E	Mike Dunleavy	Rep
F	Bill Stoltze	Rep
G	Anna MacKinnon	Dem
H	Bill Wielechowski	Dem
I	Berta Gardner	Dem
J	Johnny Ellis	Dem
K	Mia Costello	Rep
L	Lesil McGuire	Rep
M	Kevin Meyer	Rep
N	Cathy Giessel	Rep
O	Peter Micciche	Rep
P	Gary Stevens	Dem
Q	Dennis Egan	Rep
R	Bert Stedman	Rep
S	Lyman Hoffman	Dem
T	Donny Olson	Dem

== House ==
Alaska House of Representatives 29th Alaska Legislature (2015-2016)
District	Name	Party
1	Scott Kawasaki	Dem
2	Steve M. Thompson	Rep
3	Tammie Wilson	Rep
4	David Guttenberg	Dem
5	Adam Wool	Dem
6	Dave Talerico	Rep
7	Lynn Gattis	Rep
8	Mark Neuman	Rep
9	Jim Colver	Rep
10	Wes Keller	Rep
11	Shelley Hughes	Rep
12	Cathy Tilton	Rep
13	Dan Saddler	Rep
14	Lora Reinbold	Rep
15	Gabrielle LeDoux	Rep
16	Max Gruenberg	Dem
16	Ivy Spohnholz	Dem
17	Andy Josephson	Dem
18	Harriet Drummond	Dem
19	Geran Tarr	Dem
20	Les Gara	Dem
21	Matt Claman	Dem
22	Liz Vazquez	Rep
23	Chris Tuck	Dem
24	Craig Johnson	Rep
25	Charisse Millett	Rep
26	Bob Lynn	Rep
27	Lance Pruitt	Rep
28	Mike Hawker	Rep
29	Mike Chenault	Rep
30	Kurt Olson	Rep
31	Paul Seaton	Rep
32	Louise Stutes	Rep
33	Sam Kito III	Dem
34	Cathy Muñoz	Rep
35	Jonathan Kreiss-Tomkins	Dem
36	Dan Ortiz	Ind
37	Bryce Edgmon	Dem
38	Bob Herron	Dem
39	Neal Foster	Dem
40	Benjamin Nageak	Dem

== See also ==
- List of Alaska State Legislatures
