= 2016 Alaska House of Representatives election =

- November 8, 2016

All 40 seats in the Alaska House of Representatives 21 seats needed for a majority
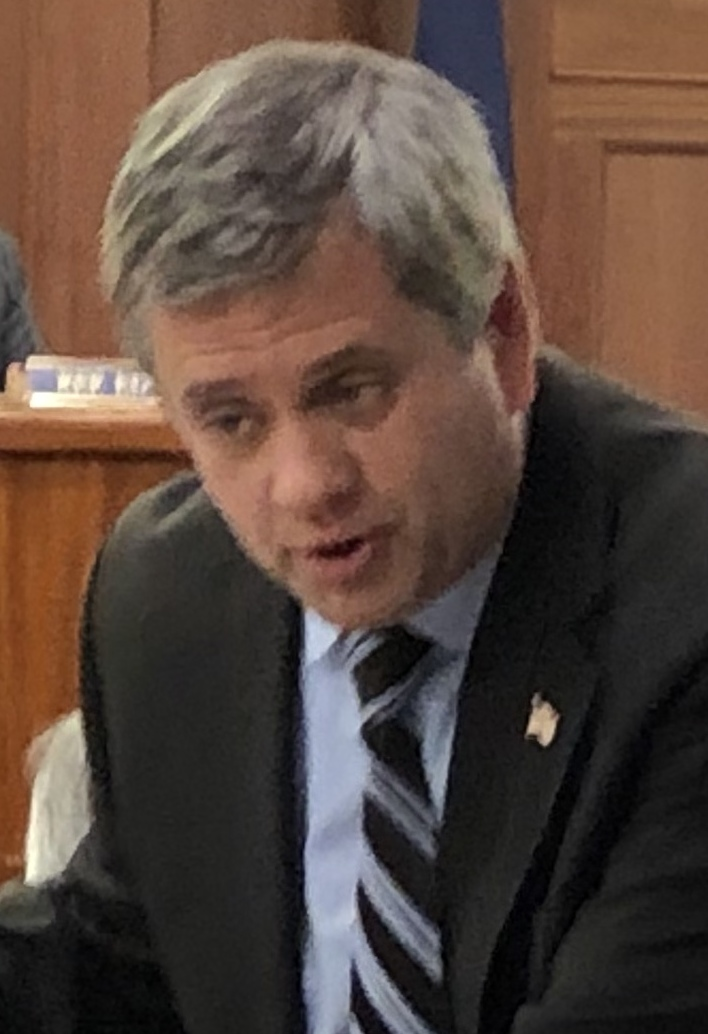

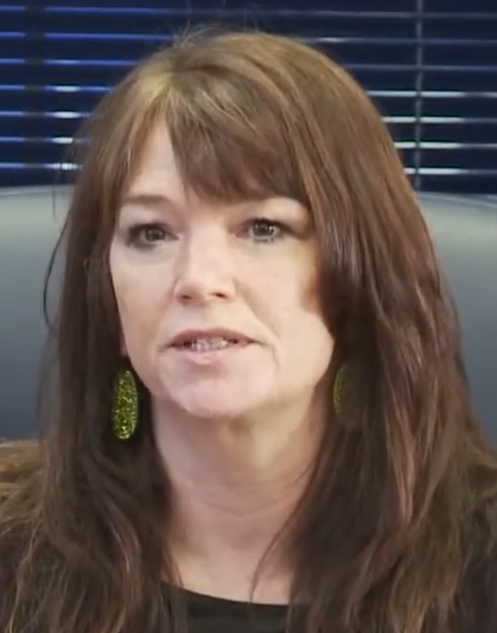
	Majority party	Minority party
Leader	Chris Tuck	Charisse Millett
Party	Democratic	Republican
Leader since	January 20, 2014	January 24, 2014
Leader's seat	23rd District	25th District
Seats before	16	23
Seats after	17 (Note: 3 Republicans and 2 independents caucus with Democrats.)	21
Seat change	▲1	▼2
Popular vote	102,277	136,723
Percentage	38.33%	51.24%
Swing	▼4.66%	▲0.58%
	Third party
Party	Independent
Seats before	1
Seats after	2
Seat change	▲1
Popular vote	16,669
Percentage	6.25%
Swing	▲2.92
- Results: Democratic gain Independent gain Democratic hold Republican hold Independent hold Vote share: 40–50% 50–60% 60–70% 70–80% 80–90% >90% 50–60% 60–70% 70–80% >90% 40–50% 50–60%
Speaker before election
Mike Chenault
Republican
Elected Speaker
Bryce Edgmon
Democratic

The 2016 Alaska House of Representatives election were held on Tuesday, November 8, 2016, with the primary election on August 16, 2016. Voters in the 40 districts of the Alaska House of Representatives elected their representatives. The elections coincided with the elections for other offices, including for U.S. president and the state Senate. The Democrats, three Republicans, and two independents formed a governing coalition with Bryce Edgmon serving as speaker.

== Overview ==
2016 Alaska House of Representatives election General election — November 8, 2016
Party	Votes	Percentage	Not up	Contested	Before	After	+/–
Democratic	102,277	38.33	0	32	16	17	▲1
Republican	136,723	51.24	0	31	23	21	▼2
Independent	16,669	6.25%	0	8	1	2	▲1
Constitution	4,634	1.74%	0	4	0	0	Steady
Alaskan Independence	730	0.27%	0	1	0	0	Steady
Write-ins	5,791	2.17%	0	40	0	0	Steady

Popular vote
Republican	51.24%
Democratic	38.33%
Independent	6.25%
Constitution	1.74%
Alaskan Independence	0.27%
Write-in	2.17%

Seats
Republican	52.50%
Democratic	42.50%
Independent	5.00%

== Predictions ==
Source	Ranking	As of
Governing	Likely R	October 12, 2016

== Results ==
=== District 1 ===
2016 Alaska's House district 1 election
Party	Candidate	Votes	%
Democratic	Scott Kawasaki (incumbent)	4,376	90.19%
Write-ins	Write-ins	476	9.81%
Total votes		4,852	100%

=== District 2 ===
2016 Alaska's House district 2 election
Party	Candidate	Votes	%
Republican	Steve Thompson (incumbent)	3,268	73.22%
Democratic	Truno Holdaway	1,153	25.83%
Write-ins	Write-ins	42	0.94%
Total votes		4,463	100%

=== District 3 ===
2016 Alaska's House district 3 election
Party	Candidate	Votes	%
Republican	Tammie Wilson (incumbent)	4,291	60.32%
Democratic	Christina M. Sinclair	537	7.55%
Independent	Jeanne Olson	2,270	31.91%
Write-ins	Write-ins	16	0.22%
Total votes		7,114	100%

=== District 4 ===
2016 Alaska's House district 4 election
Party	Candidate	Votes	%
Democratic	David Guttenberg (incumbent)	6,078	91.47%
Write-ins	Write-ins	567	8.53%
Total votes		6,645	100%

=== District 5 ===
2016 Alaska's House district 5 election
Party	Candidate	Votes	%
Democratic	Adam Wool (incumbent)	3,812	52.77%
Republican	Aaron Lojewski	3,384	46.84%
Write-ins	Write-ins	28	0.39%
Total votes		7,224	100%

=== District 6 ===
2016 Alaska's House district 6 election
Party	Candidate	Votes	%
Republican	Dave Talerico (incumbent)	5,126	68.37%
Democratic	Jason T. Land	2,327	31.04%
Write-ins	Write-ins	44	0.59%
Total votes		7,497	100%

=== District 7 ===
2016 Alaska's House district 7 election
Party	Candidate	Votes	%
Republican	Colleen Sullivan-Leonard	5,293	76.42%
Democratic	Sherie A. Olson	1,573	22.71%
Write-ins	Write-ins	60	0.87%
Total votes		6,926	100%

=== District 8 ===
2016 Alaska's House district 8 election
Party	Candidate	Votes	%
Republican	Mark Neuman (incumbent)	5,753	81.36%
Democratic	Gregory I. Jones	1,268	17.93%
Write-ins	Write-ins	50	0.71%
Total votes		7,071	100%

=== District 9 ===
2016 Alaska's House district 9 election
Party	Candidate	Votes	%
Republican	George Rauscher	4,758	61.09%
Constitution	Pamela Goode	2,816	36.15%
Write-ins	Write-ins	215	2.76%
Total votes		7,789	100%

=== District 10 ===
2016 Alaska's House district 10 election
Party	Candidate	Votes	%
Republican	David Eastman	5,901	73.98%
Democratic	Patricia Faye-Brazel	2,021	25.34%
Write-ins	Write-ins	54	0.68%
Total votes		7,976	100%

=== District 11 ===
2016 Alaska's House district 11 election
Party	Candidate	Votes	%
Republican	DeLena Johnson	5,752	67.94%
Independent	Bert Verrall	2,681	31.67%
Write-ins	Write-ins	33	0.39%
Total votes		8,466	100%

=== District 12 ===
2016 Alaska's House district 12 election
Party	Candidate	Votes	%
Republican	Cathy Tilton (incumbent)	5,597	64.83%
Democratic	Gretchen L. Wehmhoff	2,061	23.87%
Constitution	Karen Perry	949	10.99%
Write-ins	Write-ins	26	0.30%
Total votes		8,633	100%

=== District 13 ===
2016 Alaska's House district 13 election
Party	Candidate	Votes	%
Republican	Dan Saddler (incumbent)	4,417	94.32%
Write-ins	Write-ins	266	5.68%
Total votes		4,683	100%

=== District 14 ===
2016 Alaska's House district 14 election
Party	Candidate	Votes	%
Republican	Lora Reinbold (incumbent)	5,733	59.36%
Independent	Joe Hackenmueller	3,882	40.19%
Write-ins	Write-ins	43	0.45%
Total votes		9,658	100%

=== District 15 ===
2016 Alaska's House district 15 election
Party	Candidate	Votes	%
Republican	Gabrielle LeDoux (incumbent)	2,834	67.54%
Democratic	Patrick M. McCormack	1,344	32.03%
Write-ins	Write-ins	18	0.43%
Total votes		4,196	100%

=== District 16 ===
2016 Alaska's House district 16 election
Party	Candidate	Votes	%
Democratic	Ivy Spohnholz (incumbent)	3,367	51.51%
Republican	Don Hadley	2,740	41.92%
Independent	Ian Sharrock	410	6.27%
Write-ins	Write-ins	19	0.29%
Total votes		6,536	100%

=== District 17 ===
2016 Alaska's House district 17 election
Party	Candidate	Votes	%
Democratic	Andy Josephson (incumbent)	4,238	92.80%
Write-ins	Write-ins	329	7.20%
Total votes		4,567	100%

=== District 18 ===
2016 Alaska's House district 18 election
Party	Candidate	Votes	%
Democratic	Harriet Drummond (incumbent)	3,490	55.51%
Republican	Michael W. Gordon	2,760	43.90%
Write-ins	Write-ins	37	0.59%
Total votes		6,287	100%

=== District 19 ===
2016 Alaska's House district 19 election
Party	Candidate	Votes	%
Democratic	Geran Tarr (incumbent)	3,201	93.98%
Write-ins	Write-ins	205	6.02%
Total votes		3,406	100%

=== District 20 ===
2016 Alaska's House district 20 election
Party	Candidate	Votes	%
Democratic	Les Gara (incumbent)	4,730	93.04%
Write-ins	Write-ins	354	6.96%
Total votes		5,084	100%

=== District 21 ===
2016 Alaska's House district 21 election
Party	Candidate	Votes	%
Democratic	Matt Claman (incumbent)	4,145	52.15%
Republican	Marilyn Stewart	3,767	47.40%
Write-ins	Write-ins	36	0.45%
Total votes		7,948	100%

=== District 22 ===
2016 Alaska's House district 22 election
Party	Candidate	Votes	%
Independent	Jason Grenn	3,561	46.33%
Republican	Liz Vazquez (incumbent)	3,375	43.91%
Independence	Dustin Darden	730	9.50%
Write-ins	Write-ins	20	0.26%
Total votes		7,686	100%

=== District 23 ===
2016 Alaska's House district 23 election
Party	Candidate	Votes	%
Democratic	Chris Tuck (incumbent)	3,443	56.05%
Republican	Timothy R. Hui	2,672	43.50%
Write-ins	Write-ins	28	0.46%
Total votes		6,143	100%

=== District 24 ===
2016 Alaska's House district 24 election
Party	Candidate	Votes	%
Republican	Chuck Kopp	5,019	58.55%
Democratic	Sue Levi	3,518	41.04%
Write-ins	Write-ins	35	0.41%
Total votes		8,572	100%

=== District 25 ===
2016 Alaska's House district 25 election
Party	Candidate	Votes	%
Republican	Charisse Millett (incumbent)	3,685	50.41%
Democratic	Pat Higgins	3,592	49.14%
Write-ins	Write-ins	33	0.45%
Total votes		7,310	100%

=== District 26 ===
2016 Alaska's House district 26 election
Party	Candidate	Votes	%
Republican	Chris Birch	5,141	63.86%
Democratic	David Gillespie	2,873	35.69%
Write-ins	Write-ins	37	0.46%
Total votes		8,051	100%

=== District 27 ===
2016 Alaska's House district 27 election
Party	Candidate	Votes	%
Republican	Lance Pruitt (incumbent)	4,086	50.77%
Democratic	Harry Crawford Jr.	3,929	48.82%
Write-ins	Write-ins	33	0.41%
Total votes		8,051	100%

=== District 28 ===
2016 Alaska's House district 28 election
Party	Candidate	Votes	%
Republican	Jennifer Johnston	5,903	55.94%
Democratic	Shirley A. Cote	4,606	43.65%
Write-ins	Write-ins	44	0.42%
Total votes		10,553	100%

=== District 29 ===
2016 Alaska's House district 29 election
Party	Candidate	Votes	%
Republican	Mike Chenault	6,580	91.64%
Write-ins	Write-ins	600	8.36%
Total votes		7,180	100%

=== District 30 ===
2016 Alaska's House district 30 election
Party	Candidate	Votes	%
Republican	Gary Knopp	5,346	65.29%
Democratic	Shauna Thornton	1,868	22.81%
Constitution	J.R. Myers	473	5.78%
Independent	Daniel Lynch	473	5.78%
Write-ins	Write-ins	28	0.34%
Total votes		8,188	100%

=== District 31 ===
2016 Alaska's House district 31 election
Party	Candidate	Votes	%
Republican	Paul Seaton (incumbent)	7,556	95.60%
Write-ins	Write-ins	348	4.40%
Total votes		7,904	100%

=== District 32 ===
2016 Alaska's House district 32 election
Party	Candidate	Votes	%
Republican	Louise Stutes (incumbent)	2,981	43.20%
Independent	Duncan Fields	2,777	40.24%
Democratic	Brent L. Watkins	1,128	16.35%
Write-ins	Write-ins	15	0.22%
Total votes		6,901	100%

=== District 33 ===
2016 Alaska's House district 33 election
Party	Candidate	Votes	%
Democratic	Sam Kito III (incumbent)	7,576	95.67%
Write-ins	Write-ins	343	4.33%
Total votes		7,919	100%

=== District 34 ===
2016 Alaska's House district 34 election
Party	Candidate	Votes	%
Democratic	Justin Parish	4,527	50.85%
Republican	Cathy Muñoz (incumbent)	4,332	48.66%
Write-ins	Write-ins	43	0.48%
Total votes		8,902	100%

=== District 35 ===
2016 Alaska's House district 35 election
Party	Candidate	Votes	%
Democratic	Jonathan Kreiss-Tomkins (incumbent)	5,068	59.01%
Republican	Sheila Finkenbinder	3,486	40.59%
Write-ins	Write-ins	34	0.40%
Total votes		8,588	100%

=== District 36 ===
2016 Alaska's House district 36 election
Party	Candidate	Votes	%
Independent	Dan Ortiz (incumbent)	4,109	52.43%
Republican	Robert W. Siversten	3,319	42.35%
Constitution	Kenneth Shaw	396	5.05%
Write-ins	Write-ins	13	0.17%
Total votes		7,837	100%

=== District 37 ===
2016 Alaska's House district 37 election
Party	Candidate	Votes	%
Democratic	Bryce Edgmon (incumbent)	2,724	58.76%
Republican	William W. Weatherby	1,868	40.29%
Write-ins	Write-ins	44	0.95%
Total votes		4,636	100%

=== District 38 ===
2016 Alaska's House district 38 election
Party	Candidate	Votes	%
Democratic	Zach Fansler	4,134	95.63%
Write-ins	Write-ins	189	4.37%
Total votes		4,323	100%

=== District 39 ===
2016 Alaska's House district 39 election
Party	Candidate	Votes	%
Democratic	Neal Foster (incumbent)	4,661	96.80%
Write-ins	Write-ins	154	3.20%
Total votes		4,815	100%

=== District 40 ===
2016 Alaska's House district 40 election
Party	Candidate	Votes	%
Democratic	Dean Westlake	2,984	78.20%
Write-ins	Write-ins	832	21.80%
Total votes		3,816	100%

== See also ==
- 2016 Alaska Senate election
