= 31st Alaska State Legislature =

Term of state legislature in Alaska, US

←	30th Alaska State Legislature	32nd Alaska State Legislature	→
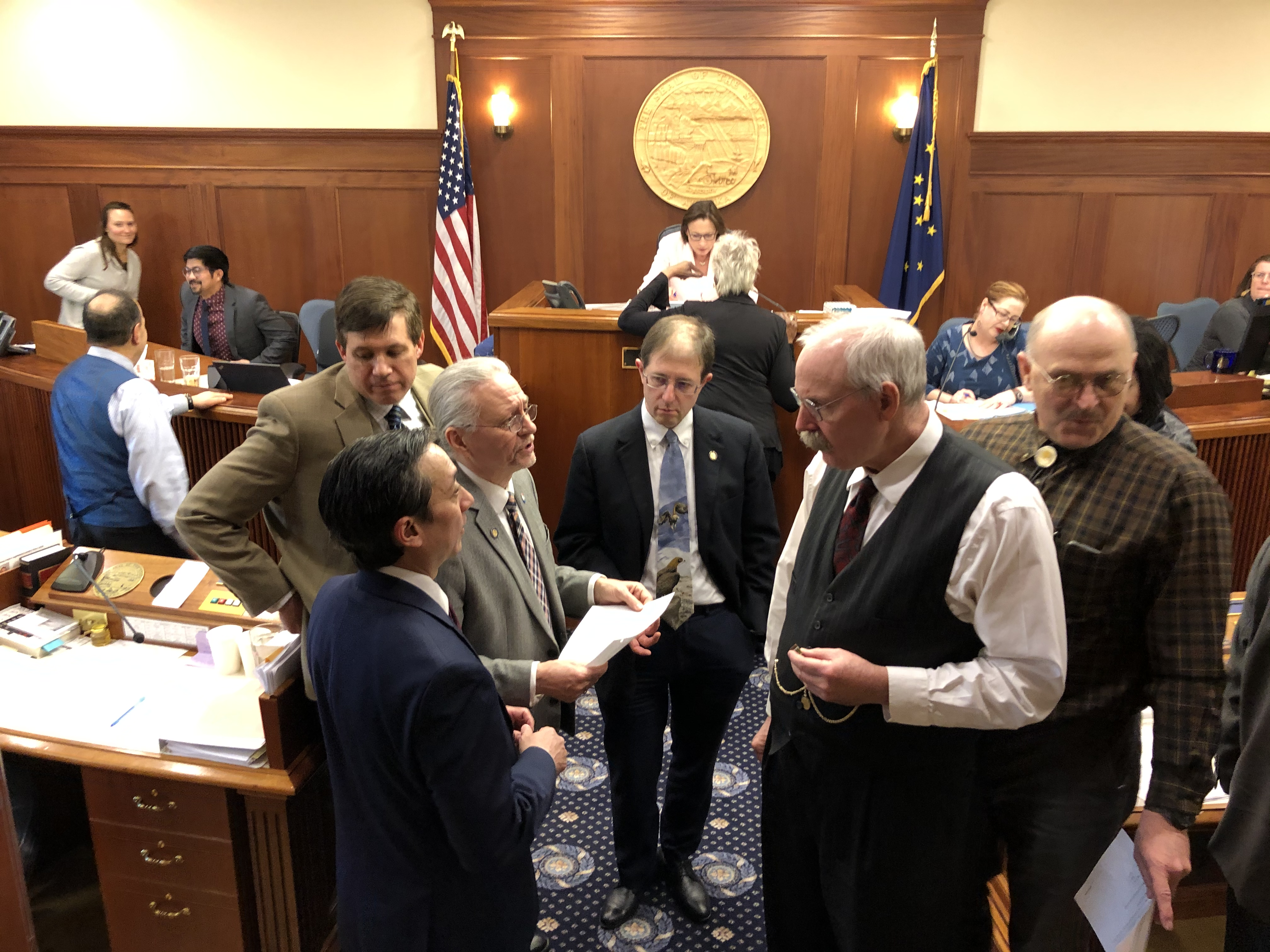

Overview
- Legislative body: Alaska Legislature
- Jurisdiction: Alaska, United States
- Meeting place: Alaska State Capitol
- Term: January 15, 2019 – January 18, 2021

Alaska Senate
- Members: 20 Senators
- Senate President: Cathy Giessel (R)
- Majority Leader: Peter Micciche (R)
- Minority Leader: Tom Begich (D)
- Party control: Republican

Alaska House of Representatives
- Members: 40 Representatives
- Speaker of the House: Bryce Edgmon (I)
- Majority Leader: Steve M. Thompson (R)
- Minority Leader: Lance Pruitt (R)
- Party control: Multipartisan coalition

The 31st Alaska State Legislature represented the legislative branch of Alaska's state government from January 15, 2019, to January 18, 2021. Its initial 60-person membership was set by the 2018 Alaska elections, though two members subsequently died in office and two resigned their seats, requiring replacements appointed by Alaska governor Mike Dunleavy.

Members of the Legislature were deeply divided by budget issues and the future of the Alaska Permanent Fund. Members of the 31st Legislature continued taking substantive action after the 2020 Alaska elections, including the authorization of a lawsuit against Dunleavy.

The 31st Legislature held two regular sessions and two special sessions:

Session	Start	End
1st Regular	January 15, 2019	May 15, 2019
1st Special	May 16, 2019	June 13, 2019
2nd Special	July 8, 2019	August 6, 2019
2nd Regular	January 21, 2020	May 19, 2020

== Organization ==
=== Alaska House of Representatives ===
In Alaska's 2018 general elections, Republican candidates won 23 seats in the Alaska House of Representatives. Democratic candidates won 16 seats, and an independent was elected to the district covering the Southeast Alaska town of Ketchikan. Immediately after the election, 20 of the newly elected Republicans announced that with the support of a 21st Republican, Rep. David Eastman of Wasilla, they would have enough votes to form a majority caucus and take control of the House from a coalition that had been in charge during the prior Legislature. This arrangement collapsed less than a month later, after Kenai Republican Rep. Gary Knopp withdrew his support, citing concerns about Eastman's reliability.

With the House divided 20–20 between a Republican bloc and a coalition, the House failed to choose a leader until mid-February. It remains the longest such leadership deadlock in state history and ended only when several Republicans crossed the aisle after Speaker of the House Bryce Edgmon changed his political affiliation to "undeclared". The result was a coalition that included 8 Republicans, 2 independents and 15 Democrats. The remaining 15 Republicans were in the minority caucus.

House Majority (Membership at end of session)

- Speaker of the House Bryce Edgmon, I-Dillingham (House District 37)
- Bart LeBon, R-Fairbanks (HD 1)
- Steve Thompson, R-Fairbanks (HD 2)
- Grier Hopkins, D-Fairbanks (HD 4)
- Adam Wool, D-Fairbanks (HD 5)
- Ivy Spohnholz, D-Anchorage (HD 16)
- Andrew "Andy" Josephson, D-Anchorage (HD 17)
- Harriet Drummond, D-Anchorage (HD 18)
- Geran Tarr, D-Anchorage (HD 19)
- Zack Fields, D-Anchorage (HD 20)
- Matthew "Matt" Claman, D-Anchorage (HD 21)
- Chris Tuck, D-Anchorage (HD 23)
- Chuck Kopp, R-Anchorage (HD 24)
- Jennifer Johnston, R-Anchorage (HD 28)
- Gary Knopp, R-Kenai (HD 30); died July 31, 2020
- Louise Stutes, R-Kodiak (HD 32)
- Sara Hannan, D-Juneau (HD 33)
- Andrea "Andi" Story, D-Juneau (HD 34)
- Jonathan Kreiss-Tomkins, D-Sitka (HD 35)
- Daniel Ortiz, I-Ketchikan (HD 36)
- Tiffany Zulkosky, D-Bethel (HD 38)
- Neal Foster, D-Nome (HD 39)
- John Lincoln, I-Kotzebue (HD 40)

House Minority

- House Minority Leader Lance Pruitt, R-Anchorage (HD 27)
- Glenn "Mike" Prax, R-North Pole (HD 3); Replaced Tammie Wilson in 2020.
- David Talerico, R-Healy (HD 6)
- Colleen Sullivan-Leonard, R-Wasilla (HD 7)
- Mark Neuman, R-Big Lake (HD 8)
- George Rauscher, R-Sutton (HD 9)
- David Eastman, R-Wasilla (HD 10)
- DeLena Johnson, R-Palmer (HD 11)
- Cathy Tilton, R-Wasilla (HD 12)
- Sharon Jackson, R-Eagle River (HD 13)
- Kelly Merrick, R-Eagle River (HD 14)
- Sara Rasmussen, R-Anchorage (HD 22)
- Mel Gillis, R-Anchorage (HD 25); Replaced Josh Revak in 2019.
- Ben Carpenter, R-Nikiski (HD 29)
- Sarah Vance, R-Homer (HD 31)

Independent Republican

- Gabrielle LeDoux, R-Anchorage (HD 15)

=== Alaska Senate ===
In the Alaska Senate, only 10 of 20 seats were part of the 2018 election. After the final results, the Senate held 13 Republicans and 7 Democrats. Because Senate President Pete Kelly lost his re-election campaign, the remaining Republicans picked Anchorage Sen. Cathy Giessel to lead the Senate. After the Republicans selected Giessel, Democratic Sen. Lyman Hoffman of Bethel joined the majority, becoming the sole non-Republican member.

== See also ==
- List of Alaska State Legislatures
- 30th Alaska State Legislature, the legislature preceding this one
- 32nd Alaska State Legislature, the legislature following this one
- List of governors of Alaska
- List of speakers of the Alaska House of Representatives
- Alaska Legislature
- Alaska Senate
- {AKLeg.gov}
