= 2014 Alaska House of Representatives election =

- November 4, 2014

All 40 seats in the Alaska House of Representatives 21 seats needed for a majority
	Majority party	Minority party
Party	Republican	Democratic
Seats before	26	14
Seats after	23	16
Seat change	▼3	▲2
	Third party
Party	Independent
Seats before	0
Seats after	1
Seat change	▲1
- Results: Democratic gain Independent gain Republican hold Democratic hold

The 2014 Alaska House of Representatives elections were held on Tuesday, November 4, 2014, with the primary election on August 19, 2014. Voters in the 40 districts of the Alaska House of Representatives elected their representatives. The elections coincided with the elections for other offices, including the state senate.

== Overview ==
2014 Alaska House of Representatives election General election — November 4, 2014
Party	Votes	Percentage	Contested	Before	After	+/–
Republican	129,395	50.66%	30	26	23	▼3
Democratic	111,213	43.54%	36	14	16	▲2
Independent	8,508	3.33%	4	0	1	▲1
Constitution	1,874	0.73%	1	0	0	Steady
Libertarian	1,461	0.57%	1	0	0	Steady
Write-ins	2,951	1.16%	40	0	0	Steady

Popular vote
Republican	50.66%
Democratic	43.54%
Independent	3.33%
Constitution	0.73%
Libertarian	0.57%
Write-in	1.16%

Seats
Republican	57.50%
Democratic	40.00%
Independent	2.50%

== Predictions ==
Source	Ranking	As of
Governing	Safe R	October 20, 2014

== Results ==
=== District 1 ===
2014 Alaska's House district 1 election
Party	Candidate	Votes	%
Democratic	Scott Kawasaki (incumbent)	2,973	54.76%
Republican	Gregory Don Bringhurst	2,434	44.83%
Write-ins	Write-ins	22	0.41%
Total votes		5,429	100.00%

=== District 2 ===
2014 Alaska's House district 2 election
Party	Candidate	Votes	%
Republican	Steve Thompson (incumbent)	2,324	67.30%
Democratic	Larry Murakami	1,118	32.38%
Write-ins	Write-ins	11	0.32%
Total votes		3,453	100.00%

=== District 3 ===
2014 Alaska's House district 3 election
Party	Candidate	Votes	%
Republican	Tammie Wilson (incumbent)	4,562	79.16%
Democratic	Sharron J. Hunter	1,171	20.32%
Write-ins	Write-ins	30	0.52%
Total votes		5,763	100.00%

=== District 4 ===
2014 Alaska's House district 4 election
Party	Candidate	Votes	%
Democratic	David Guttenberg (incumbent)	4,265	57.33%
Republican	Joe Blanchard II	3,390	42.02%
Write-ins	Write-ins	52	0.64%
Total votes		8,067	100.00%

=== District 5 ===
2014 Alaska's House district 5 election
Party	Candidate	Votes	%
Democratic	Adam Wool (incumbent)	3,379	52.31%
Republican	Pete B. Higgins	3,037	47.01%
Write-ins	Write-ins	44	0.68%
Total votes		6,460	100.00%

=== District 6 ===
2014 Alaska's House district 6 election
Party	Candidate	Votes	%
Republican	Dave Talerico	3,940	60.02%
Democratic	Wilson Justin	2,590	39.45%
Write-ins	Write-ins	35	0.53%
Total votes		6,565	100.00%

=== District 7 ===
2014 Alaska's House district 7 election
Party	Candidate	Votes	%
Republican	Lynn Gattis (incumbent)	4,024	64.16%
Independent	Verne Rupright	2,209	35.22%
Write-ins	Write-ins	39	0.62%
Total votes		6,272	100.00%

=== District 8 ===
2014 Alaska's House district 8 election
Party	Candidate	Votes	%
Republican	Mark Neuman (incumbent)	4,689	79.45%
Democratic	Pam Rahn	1,168	19.79%
Write-ins	Write-ins	45	0.76%
Total votes		5,902	100.00%

=== District 9 ===
2014 Alaska's House district 9 election
Party	Candidate	Votes	%
Republican	Jim Colver (incumbent)	4,075	58.16%
Constitution	Pamela Goode	1,874	26.74%
Democratic	Mabel H. Wimmer	1,009	14.40%
Write-ins	Write-ins	49	0.70%
Total votes		7,007	100.00%

=== District 10 ===
2014 Alaska's House district 10 election
Party	Candidate	Votes	%
Republican	Wes Keller (incumbent)	4,486	64.09%
Democratic	Neal T. Lacy	1,479	21.13%
Independent	Roger Purcell	1,000	31.67%
Write-ins	Write-ins	35	0.50%
Total votes		7,000	100.00%

=== District 11 ===
2014 Alaska's House district 11 election
Party	Candidate	Votes	%
Republican	Shelley Hughes (incumbent)	5,268	69.69%
Democratic	Pete P. LaFrance (D)	2,275	30.10%
Write-ins	Write-ins	16	0.21%
Total votes		7,559	100.00%

=== District 12 ===
2014 Alaska's House district 12 election
Party	Candidate	Votes	%
Republican	Cathy Tilton	5,569	71.75%
Democratic	Gretchen L. Wehmhoff	2,155	27.76%
Write-ins	Write-ins	38	0.49%
Total votes		7,762	100.00%

=== District 13 ===
2014 Alaska's House district 13 election
Party	Candidate	Votes	%
Republican	Dan Saddler (incumbent)	3,642	95.79%
Write-ins	Write-ins	160	4.21%
Total votes		3,802	100.00%

=== District 14 ===
2014 Alaska's House district 14 election
Party	Candidate	Votes	%
Republican	Lora Reinbold (incumbent)	6,172	74.00%
Democratic	Miles D. Pruner	2,123	25.46%
Write-ins	Write-ins	45	0.54%
Total votes		8,340	100.00%

=== District 15 ===
2014 Alaska's House district 15 election
Party	Candidate	Votes	%
Republican	Gabrielle LeDoux (incumbent)	1,995	52.67%
Democratic	Laurie Hummel	1,782	47.04%
Write-ins	Write-ins	11	0.29%
Total votes		3,788	100.00%

=== District 16 ===
2014 Alaska's House district 16 election
Party	Candidate	Votes	%
Democratic	Max Gruenberg (incumbent)	3,253	53.92%
Republican	Don Hadley	2,745	45.50%
Write-ins	Write-ins	35	0.58%
Total votes		6,033	100.00%

=== District 17 ===
2014 Alaska's House district 17 election
Party	Candidate	Votes	%
Democratic	Andy Josephson (incumbent)	4,055	93.43%
Write-ins	Write-ins	285	6.57%
Total votes		4,340	100.00%

=== District 18 ===
2014 Alaska's House district 18 election
Party	Candidate	Votes	%
Democratic	Harriet Drummond (incumbent)	3,764	67.00%
Independent	Phil Isley	1,769	31.49%
Write-ins	Write-ins	85	1.51%
Total votes		5,618	100.00%

=== District 19 ===
2014 Alaska's House district 19 election
Party	Candidate	Votes	%
Democratic	Geran Tarr (incumbent)	2,545	62.98%
Libertarian	Cean Stevens	1,461	36.15%
Write-ins	Write-ins	35	0.87%
Total votes		4,041	100.00%

=== District 20 ===
2014 Alaska's House district 20 election
Party	Candidate	Votes	%
Democratic	Les Gara (incumbent)	4,635	92.87%
Write-ins	Write-ins	356	7.13%
Total votes		4,991	100.00%

=== District 21 ===
2014 Alaska's House district 21 election
Party	Candidate	Votes	%
Democratic	Matt Claman	3,849	50.41%
Republican	Anand Dubey	3,759	49.23%
Write-ins	Write-ins	28	0.37%
Total votes		7,636	100.00%

=== District 22 ===
2014 Alaska's House district 22 election
Party	Candidate	Votes	%
Republican	Liz Vazquez	4,143	56.62%
Democratic	Marty M. McGee	3,138	42.89%
Write-ins	Write-ins	36	0.49%
Total votes		7,317	100.00%

=== District 23 ===
2014 Alaska's House district 23 election
Party	Candidate	Votes	%
Democratic	Chris Tuck (incumbent)	4,208	92.61%
Write-ins	Write-ins	336	7.39%
Total votes		4,544	100.00%

=== District 24 ===
2014 Alaska's House district 24 election
Party	Candidate	Votes	%
Republican	Craig Johnson (incumbent)	5,073	63.14%
Democratic	Michael "Mike" Fenster	2,926	36.42%
Write-ins	Write-ins	35	0.44%
Total votes		8,034	100.00%

=== District 25 ===
2014 Alaska's House district 25 election
Party	Candidate	Votes	%
Republican	Charisse Millett (incumbent)	3,655	54.37%
Democratic	Patti Higgins	3,045	45.29%
Write-ins	Write-ins	23	0.34%
Total votes		6,723	100.00%

=== District 26 ===
2014 Alaska's House district 26 election
Party	Candidate	Votes	%
Republican	Bob Lynn	4,913	66.50%
Democratic	Bill Goodell	2,436	32.97%
Write-ins	Write-ins	39	0.53%
Total votes		7,388	100.00%

=== District 27 ===
2014 Alaska's House district 27 election
Party	Candidate	Votes	%
Republican	Lance Pruitt (incumbent)	4,463	58.52%
Democratic	Matt Moore	3,138	41.15%
Write-ins	Write-ins	25	0.33%
Total votes		7,626	100.00%

=== District 28 ===
2014 Alaska's House district 28 election
Party	Candidate	Votes	%
Republican	Mike Hawker (incumbent)	6,121	62.10%
Democratic	Samuel Duff Combs	3,691	37.45%
Write-ins	Write-ins	45	0.46%
Total votes		9,857	100.00%

=== District 29 ===
2014 Alaska's House district 29 election
Party	Candidate	Votes	%
Republican	Mike Chenault (incumbent)	5,629	75.99%
Democratic	Rocky Knudsen	1,725	23.29%
Write-ins	Write-ins	54	0.73%
Total votes		7,408	100.00%

=== District 30 ===
2014 Alaska's House district 30 election
Party	Candidate	Votes	%
Republican	Kurt Olson (incumbent)	5,285	72.75%
Democratic	Shauna L. Thornton	1,940	26.70%
Write-ins	Write-ins	40	0.55%
Total votes		7,265	100.00%

=== District 31 ===
2014 Alaska's House district 31 election
Party	Candidate	Votes	%
Republican	Paul Seaton (incumbent)	6,942	97.01%
Write-ins	Write-ins	214	2.99%
Total votes		7,156	100.00%

=== District 32 ===
2014 Alaska's House district 32 election
Party	Candidate	Votes	%
Republican	Louise Stutes	3,236	55.18%
Democratic	Jerry G. McCune	2,608	44.47%
Write-ins	Write-ins	20	0.34%
Total votes		5,864	100.00%

=== District 33 ===
2014 Alaska's House district 33 election
Party	Candidate	Votes	%
Democratic	Sam Kito III (incumbent)	6,575	75.60%
Republican	Peter Dukowitz	2,077	23.88%
Write-ins	Write-ins	45	0.52%
Total votes		8,697	100.00%

=== District 34 ===
2014 Alaska's House district 34 election
Party	Candidate	Votes	%
Republican	Cathy Muñoz (incumbent)	5,132	62.20%
Democratic	George McGuan	3,090	37.45%
Write-ins	Write-ins	29	0.35%
Total votes		8,251	100.00%

=== District 35 ===
2014 Alaska's House district 35 election
Party	Candidate	Votes	%
Democratic	Jonathan Kreiss-Tomkins (incumbent)	4,630	59.03%
Republican	Steven A. Samuelson	3,189	40.66%
Write-ins	Write-ins	24	0.31%
Total votes		7,843	100.00%

=== District 36 ===
2014 Alaska's House district 36 election
Party	Candidate	Votes	%
Independent	Dan Ortiz	3,530	50.59%
Republican	Chere L. Klein	3,426	49.10%
Write-ins	Write-ins	22	0.32%
Total votes		6,978	100.00%

=== District 37 ===
2014 Alaska's House district 37 election
Party	Candidate	Votes	%
Democratic	Bryce Edgmon (incumbent)	4,173	97.36%
Write-ins	Write-ins	113	2.64%
Total votes		4,286	100.00%

=== District 38 ===
2014 Alaska's House district 38 election
Party	Candidate	Votes	%
Democratic	Bob Herron (incumbent)	4,683	96.98%
Write-ins	Write-ins	146	3.02%
Total votes		4,829	100.00%

=== District 39 ===
2014 Alaska's House district 39 election
Party	Candidate	Votes	%
Democratic	Neal Foster (incumbent)	5,277	97.61%
Write-ins	Write-ins	129	2.39%
Total votes		5,406	100.00%

=== District 40 ===
2014 Alaska's House district 40 election
Party	Candidate	Votes	%
Democratic	Benjamin Nageak (incumbent)	3,982	97.07%
Write-ins	Write-ins	120	2.93%
Total votes		4,102	100.00%

== See also ==
- 2014 Alaska Senate election
