= 30th Alaska State Legislature =

Term of state legislature in Alaska, US

←	29th State Legislature	31st State Legislature	→

Overview
- Legislative body: Alaska Legislature
- Jurisdiction: Alaska, United States
- Meeting place: Alaska State Capitol
- Term: 2017–2019

Alaska Senate
- Members: 20 Senators
- Senate President: Pete Kelly (R)
- Majority Leader: Peter Micciche (R)
- Minority Leader: Berta Gardner (D)
- Party control: Republican

Alaska House of Representatives
- Members: 40 Representatives
- Speaker of the House: Bryce Edgmon (D)
- Majority Leader: Chris Tuck (D)
- Minority Leader: Charisse Millett (R)
- Party control: Multipartisan coalition

The 30th Alaska State Legislature was the meeting of the Alaska Legislature, beginning January 17, 2017.

In the Senate and House elections, neither party gained a seat in the Senate and, leaving a 14–6 majority and maintaining its 35–25 control of the House.

== Senate ==
Based on the results of the 2016 elections, the Alaska Senate is composed of 6 Democrats and 14 Republicans.

== Senate members ==
Senate President: Pete Kelly (D–A Fairbanks)
Majority Leader: Peter Micciche (R–O Soldotna)
Minority Leader: Berta Gardner (D–I Anchorage)

Alaska State Senate 30th Alaska Legislature, 2017–2018
District	Name	Party	Residence	Assumed office	Next election
A	Pete Kelly	Republican	Fairbanks	2013	2018
B	John Coghill	Republican	North Pole	2009	2020
C	Click Bishop	Republican	Fairbanks	2013	2018
D	David Wilson	Republican	Wasilla	2017	2020
E	Mike Dunleavy	Republican ^{b}	Wasilla	2013	2018
F	Shelley Hughes	Republican	Palmer	2017	2020
G	Anna MacKinnon	Republican	Eagle River	2013	2018
H	Bill Wielechowski	Democratic	Anchorage	2007	2020
I	Berta Gardner	Democratic	Anchorage	2013	2018
J	Tom Begich	Democratic	Anchorage	2017	2020
K	Mia Costello	Republican	Anchorage	2015	2018
L	Natasha von Imhof	Republican	Anchorage	2016	2020
M	Kevin Meyer	Republican	Anchorage	2009	2018
N	Cathy Giessel	Republican	Anchorage	2011	2018
O	Peter Micciche	Republican	Soldotna	2013	2018
P	Gary Stevens	Republican	Kodiak	2003	2020
Q	Dennis Egan	Democratic	Juneau	2009	2018
R	Bert Stedman	Republican	Sitka	2003	2020
S	Lyman Hoffman	Democratic^{a}	Bethel	1995	2018
T	Donny Olson	Democratic	Golovin	2001	2020

== House members ==
Based on the results of the 2016 elections, the Alaska House of Representatives was composed of 21 Republicans, 17 Democrats and 2 independents. The Democrats and the independents both gained one seat. The Democrats, two independents and three Republicans caucus together giving the Democratic Party 22-18 majority.

Speaker: Bryce Edgmon (D-37 Dillingham)
Majority Leader: Chris Tuck (D-23 Anchorage)
Minority Leader: Charisse Millett (R-25 Anchorage)

Alaska State House of Representatives 30th Alaska Legislature, 2017–2018
District	Name	Party	Residence	Assumed office
1	Scott Kawasaki	Dem	Fairbanks	2007
2	Steve Thompson	Rep	Fairbanks	2011
3	Tammie Wilson	Rep	North Pole	2009
4	David Guttenberg	Dem	Fairbanks	2003
5	Adam Wool	Dem	Fairbanks	2015
6	Dave Talerico	Rep	Healy	2015
7	Colleen Sullivan-Leonard	Rep	Wasilla	2017
8	Mark Neuman	Rep	Big Lake	2005
9	George Rauscher	Rep	Palmer	2017
10	David Eastman	Rep	Wasilla	2017
11	DeLena Johnson	Rep	Palmer	2017
12	Cathy Tilton	Rep	Wasilla	2015
13	Dan Saddler	Rep	Eagle River	2011
14	Lora Reinbold	Rep	Eagle River	2013
15	Gabrielle LeDoux	Rep-Coalition	Anchorage	2013
16	Ivy Spohnholz	Dem	Anchorage	2016↑
17	Andy Josephson	Dem	Anchorage	2013
18	Harriet Drummond	Dem	Anchorage	2013
19	Geran Tarr	Dem	Anchorage	2013
20	Les Gara	Dem	Anchorage	2003
21	Matt Claman	Dem	Anchorage	2015
22	Jason Grenn	Ind	Anchorage	2017
23	Chris Tuck	Dem	Anchorage	2009
24	Chuck Kopp	Rep	Anchorage	2017
25	Charisse Millett	Rep	Anchorage	2009
26	Chris Birch	Rep	Anchorage	2017
27	Lance Pruitt	Rep	Anchorage	2011
28	Jennifer Johnston	Rep	Anchorage	2017
29	Mike Chenault	Rep	Nikiski	2001
30	Gary Knopp	Rep	Soldotna	2017
31	Paul Seaton	Rep-Coalition	Homer	2003
32	Louise Stutes	Rep-Coalition	Kodiak	2015
33	Sam Kito III	Dem	Juneau	2014
34	Justin Parish	Dem	Juneau	2017
35	Jonathan Kreiss-Tomkins	Dem	Sitka	2013
36	Dan Ortiz	Ind	Ketchikan	2015
37	Bryce Edgmon	Dem	Dillingham	2007
38	Zach Fansler	Dem	Bethel	2017
39	Neal Foster	Dem	Nome	2009
40	Dean Westlake	Dem	Kotzebue	2017

- ↑ Member was originally appointed.

== See also ==
- List of Alaska State Legislatures
- 29th Alaska State Legislature, the legislature preceding this one
- 31st Alaska State Legislature, the legislature following this one
- List of governors of Alaska
- List of speakers of the Alaska House of Representatives
- Alaska Legislature
- Alaska Senate
- Alaska State Senate election, 2016
- {AKLeg.gov}
