= 2018 Alaska House of Representatives election =

- November 6, 2018

All 40 seats in the Alaska House of Representatives
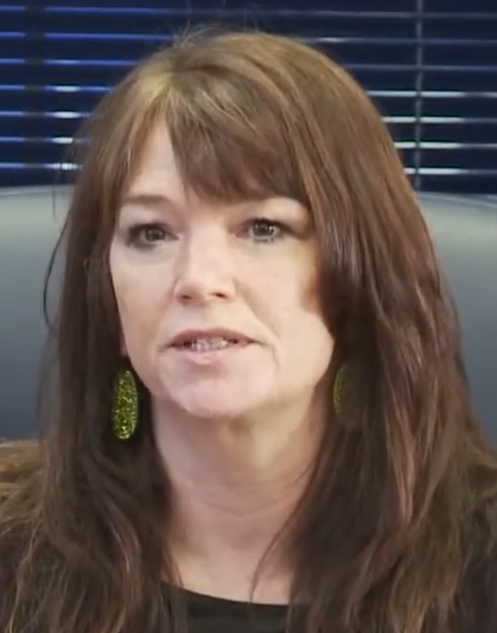

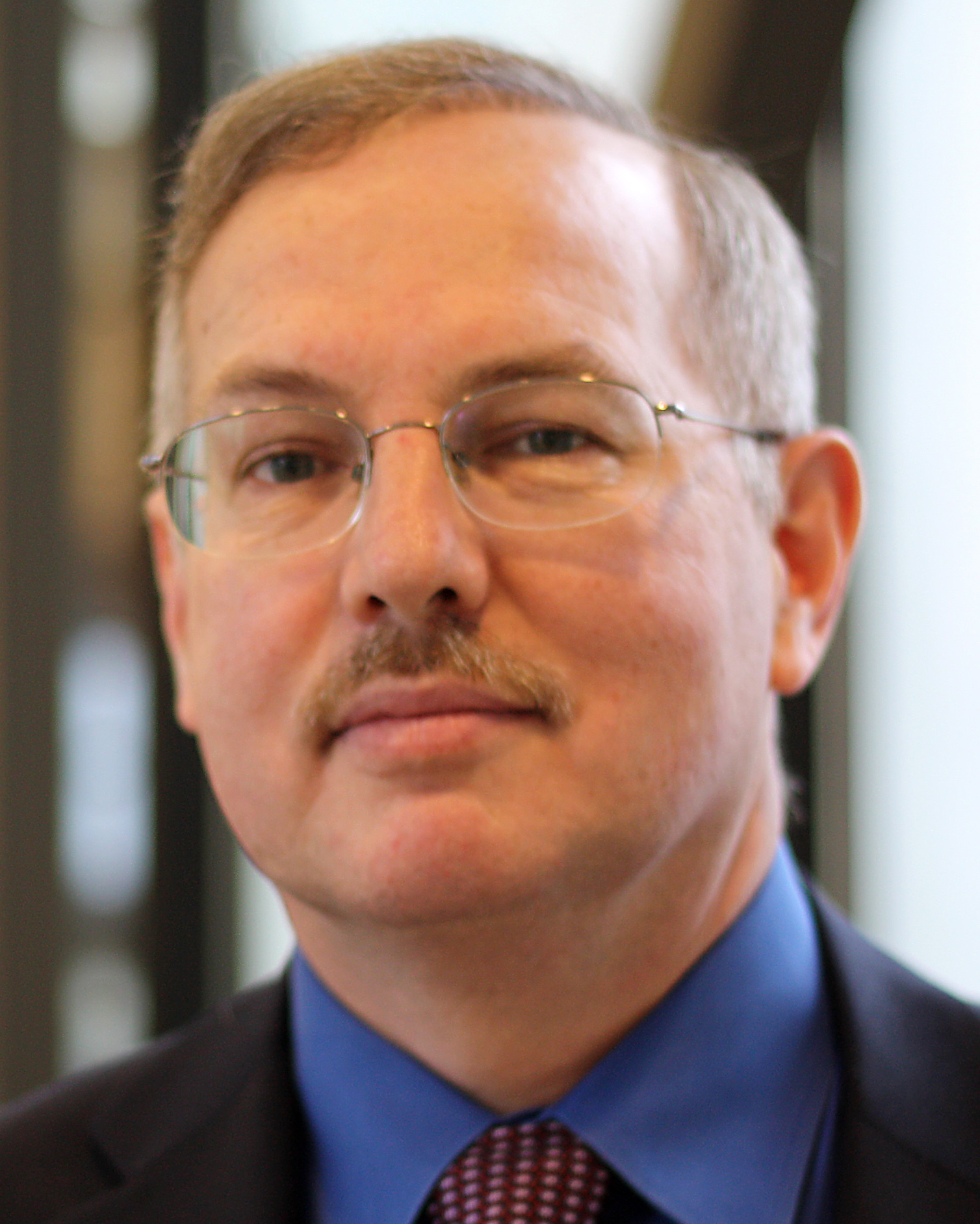

| | Majority party | Minority party | Third party |
|---|---|---|---|
| Leader | Charisse Millett | Bryce Edgmon |
| Party | Republican | Democratic | Independent |
| Leader since | January 17, 2017 | January 17, 2017 |
| Leader's seat | 25th District | 37th District |
| Seats before | 21 (Note: 3 Republicans and 2 Independents joined all 17 Democrats to form a governing coalition) | 17 | 2 |
| Seats after | 23 | 16 | 1 |
| Seat change | ▲2 | ▼1 | ▼1 |
| Popular vote | 136,961 | 99,956 | 23,074 |
| Percentage | 51.60% | 37.66% | 8.69% |
| Swing | ▲0.36% | ▼1.22% | ▲2.44% |
- Results: Republican hold Republican gain Democratic hold Independent hold
Speaker before election
Bryce Edgmon
Democratic
Speaker
Bryce Edgmon
Independent

The 2018 Alaska House of Representatives election were held on Tuesday, November 6, 2018, with the primary election on August 21, 2018. Voters in the 40 districts of the Alaska House of Representatives elected their representatives. The elections coincided with the elections for other state offices, including the gubernatorial election and the state senate elections. While Republicans gained a nominal majority in the chamber, when the new House convened in 2019, Democratic members formed a coalition with independents and dissident Republicans to re-elect Bryce Edgmon as speaker.

== Overview ==
2018 Alaska House of Representatives elections General election — November 6, 2018
| Party | Votes | % | Candidates | Before | After | +/– |
|---|---|---|---|---|---|---|
| Republican | 136,961 | 51.60% | 36 | 21 | 23 | ▲2 |
| Democratic | 99,956 | 37.66% | 34 | 17 | 16 | ▼1 |
| Independent | 23,074 | 8.69% | 11 | 2 | 1 | ▼1 |
| Libertarian | 2,274 | 0.85% | 3 | 0 | 0 | Steady |
| Write-ins | 3,135 | 1.18% | — | — | — | — |

Popular vote
| Republican | 51.60% |
| Democratic | 37.66% |
| Independent | 8.69% |
| Libertarian | 0.85% |
| Write-in | 1.18% |

Seats
| Republican | 57.50% |
| Democratic | 40.00% |
| Independent | 2.50% |

== Predictions ==
| Source | Ranking | As of |
|---|---|---|
| Governing | Tossup | October 8, 2018 |

== Results ==
=== District 1 ===
2018 Alaska's House district 1 election
| Party | Candidate | Votes | % |
|---|---|---|---|
| Republican | Bart LeBon | 2,663 | 49.85% |
| Democratic | Kathryn Dodge | 2,662 | 49.83% |
| Write-ins | Write-ins | 17 | 0.32% |
| Total votes | | 5,342 | 100% |
| Republican gain from Democratic | | | |

After originally being tied, a recount was ordered, which put LeBon ahead by only one vote. On December 5, Dodge appealed the result to the Alaska Supreme Court. However, on January 4, the court denied Dodge's appeal, officially making LeBon the winner.

=== District 2 ===
2018 Alaska's House district 2 election
| Party | Candidate | Votes | % |
|---|---|---|---|
| Republican | Steve Thompson (incumbent) | 2,340 | 66.14% |
| Democratic | Van Lawrence | 1,186 | 33.52% |
| Write-ins | Write-ins | 12 | 0.34% |
| Total votes | | 3,538 | 100% |
| Republican hold | | | |

=== District 3 ===
2018 Alaska's House district 3 election
| Party | Candidate | Votes | % |
|---|---|---|---|
| Republican | Tammie Wilson (incumbent) | 4,854 | 92.14% |
| Write-ins | Write-ins | 414 | 7.86% |
| Total votes | | 5,286 | 100% |
| Republican hold | | | |

=== District 4 ===
2018 Alaska's House district 4 election
| Party | Candidate | Votes | % |
|---|---|---|---|
| Democratic | Grier Hopkins | 4,356 | 51.74% |
| Republican | Jim Sackett | 3,650 | 43.35% |
| Independent | Tim Lankin | 395 | 4.69% |
| Write-ins | Write-ins | 18 | 0.21% |
| Total votes | | 8,419 | 100% |
| Democratic hold | | | |

=== District 5 ===
2018 Alaska's House district 5 election
| Party | Candidate | Votes | % |
|---|---|---|---|
| Democratic | Adam Wool (incumbent) | 3,484 | 53.02% |
| Republican | Kevin McKinley | 3,057 | 46.52% |
| Write-ins | Write-ins | 30 | 0.46% |
| Total votes | | 6,571 | 100% |
| Democratic hold | | | |

=== District 6 ===
2018 Alaska's House district 6 election
| Party | Candidate | Votes | % |
|---|---|---|---|
| Republican | Dave Talerico (incumbent) | 4,001 | 59.29% |
| Democratic | Ed Alexander | 2,722 | 40.34% |
| Write-ins | Write-ins | 25 | 0.59% |
| Total votes | | 6,748 | 100% |
| Republican hold | | | |

=== District 7 ===
2018 Alaska's House district 7 election
| Party | Candidate | Votes | % |
|---|---|---|---|
| Republican | Colleen Sullivan-Leonard (incumbent) | 5,705 | 95.23% |
| Write-ins | Write-ins | 286 | 4.77% |
| Total votes | | 5,991 | 100% |
| Republican hold | | | |

=== District 8 ===
2018 Alaska's House district 8 election
| Party | Candidate | Votes | % |
|---|---|---|---|
| Republican | Mark Neuman (incumbent) | 5,126 | 72.29% |
| Democratic | James Chesbro | 1,184 | 16.7% |
| Libertarian | Mark Fish | 767 | 10.82% |
| Write-ins | Write-ins | 14 | 0.2% |
| Total votes | | 7,091 | 100% |
| Republican hold | | | |

=== District 9 ===
2018 Alaska's House district 9 election
| Party | Candidate | Votes | % |
|---|---|---|---|
| Republican | George Rauscher (incumbent) | 5,209 | 67.49% |
| Democratic | Bill Johnson | 1,962 | 25.42% |
| Independent | James Squyres | 515 | 6.67% |
| Write-ins | Write-ins | 32 | 0.41% |
| Total votes | | 7,718 | 100% |
| Republican hold | | | |

=== District 10 ===
2018 Alaska's House district 10 election
| Party | Candidate | Votes | % |
|---|---|---|---|
| Republican | David Eastman (incumbent) | 4,524 | 57.36% |
| Democratic | Patricia Faye-Brazel | 1,731 | 21.95% |
| Independent | Doyle Holmes | 1,616 | 20.49% |
| Write-ins | Write-ins | 16 | 0.2% |
| Total votes | | 7,887 | 100% |
| Republican hold | | | |

=== District 11 ===
2018 Alaska's House district 11 election
| Party | Candidate | Votes | % |
|---|---|---|---|
| Republican | DeLena Johnson (incumbent) | 5,739 | 71.76% |
| Democratic | Eileen Patterson | 2,217 | 27.72% |
| Write-ins | Write-ins | 42 | 0.39% |
| Total votes | | 7,998 | 100% |
| Republican hold | | | |

=== District 12 ===
2018 Alaska's House district 12 election
| Party | Candidate | Votes | % |
|---|---|---|---|
| Republican | Cathy Tilton (incumbent) | 6,099 | 75.14% |
| Democratic | Stephany Jeffers | 1,993 | 24.55% |
| Write-ins | Write-ins | 25 | 0.31% |
| Total votes | | 8,117 | 100% |
| Republican hold | | | |

=== District 13 ===
2018 Alaska's House district 13 election
| Party | Candidate | Votes | % |
|---|---|---|---|
| Republican | Nancy Dahlstrom | 3,328 | 70.96% |
| Democratic | Danyelle Kimp | 1,346 | 28.7% |
| Write-ins | Write-ins | 16 | 0.34% |
| Total votes | | 4,690 | 100% |
| Republican hold | | | |

On December 5, Governor Mike Dunleavy named Dahlstrom the new Commissioner of the Alaska Department of Corrections. 15 days later, Dunleavy appointed former lieutenant governor candidate Sharon Jackson to fill Dahlstrom's seat.

=== District 14 ===
2018 Alaska's House district 14 election
| Party | Candidate | Votes | % |
|---|---|---|---|
| Republican | Kelly Merrick | 5,485 | 65.57% |
| Independent | Joe Hackenmueller (Note: Filed as an independent candidate but also received the Democratic nomination in the primary.) | 2,814 | 33.64% |
| Write-ins | Write-ins | 66 | 0.45% |
| Total votes | | 8,365 | 100% |
| Republican hold | | | |

=== District 15 ===
2018 Alaska's House district 15 election
| Party | Candidate | Votes | % |
|---|---|---|---|
| Republican | Gabrielle LeDoux (incumbent) | 1,380 | 41.64% |
| Democratic | Lyn Franks | 1,139 | 34.37% |
| Write-ins | Write-ins | 795 | 23.99% |
| Total votes | | 3,314 | 100% |
| Republican hold | | | |

=== District 16 ===
2018 Alaska's House district 16 election
| Party | Candidate | Votes | % |
|---|---|---|---|
| Democratic | Ivy Spohnholz (incumbent) | 3,249 | 55.11% |
| Republican | Stanley Wright | 2,618 | 44.41% |
| Write-ins | Write-ins | 28 | 0.47% |
| Total votes | | 5,895 | 100% |
| Democratic hold | | | |

=== District 17 ===
2018 Alaska's House district 17 election
| Party | Candidate | Votes | % |
|---|---|---|---|
| Democratic | Andy Josephson (incumbent) | 3,171 | 59.47% |
| Republican | Marcus Sanders | 2,148 | 40.29% |
| Write-ins | Write-ins | 13 | 0.24% |
| Total votes | | 5,332 | 100% |
| Democratic hold | | | |

=== District 18 ===
2018 Alaska's House district 18 election
| Party | Candidate | Votes | % |
|---|---|---|---|
| Democratic | Harriet Drummond (incumbent) | 3,771 | 64.72% |
| Republican | Anthony Lekanoff | 2,034 | 34.91% |
| Write-ins | Write-ins | 22 | 0.38% |
| Total votes | | 5,827 | 100% |
| Democratic hold | | | |

=== District 19 ===
2018 Alaska's House district 19 election
| Party | Candidate | Votes | % |
|---|---|---|---|
| Democratic | Geran Tarr (incumbent) | 2,531 | 66.82% |
| Libertarian | Cean Stevens | 1,211 | 31.97% |
| Write-ins | Write-ins | 46 | 6.02% |
| Total votes | | 3,788 | 100% |
| Democratic hold | | | |

=== District 20 ===
2018 Alaska's House district 20 election
| Party | Candidate | Votes | % |
|---|---|---|---|
| Democratic | Zack Fields | 3,738 | 65.33% |
| Republican | Ceezar Martinson | 1,662 | 29.05% |
| Libertarian | Warren West | 296 | 5.17% |
| Write-ins | Write-ins | 26 | 0.45% |
| Total votes | | 5,722 | 100% |
| Democratic hold | | | |

=== District 21 ===
2018 Alaska's House district 21 election
| Party | Candidate | Votes | % |
|---|---|---|---|
| Democratic | Matt Claman (incumbent) | 4,058 | 54.55% |
| Republican | Marilyn Stewart | 3,364 | 45.22% |
| Write-ins | Write-ins | 17 | 0.23% |
| Total votes | | 7,439 | 100% |
| Democratic hold | | | |

=== District 22 ===
2018 Alaska's House district 22 election
| Party | Candidate | Votes | % |
|---|---|---|---|
| Republican | Sara Rasmussen | 3,478 | 47.14% |
| Independent | Jason Grenn (incumbent) | 3,031 | 41.08% |
| Democratic | Dustin Darden | 860 | 11.66% |
| Write-ins | Write-ins | 9 | 0.12% |
| Total votes | | 7,378 | 100% |
| Republican gain from Independent | | | |

=== District 23 ===
2018 Alaska's House district 23 election
| Party | Candidate | Votes | % |
|---|---|---|---|
| Democratic | Chris Tuck (incumbent) | 2,973 | 53.13% |
| Republican | Connie Dougherty | 2,605 | 46.55% |
| Write-ins | Write-ins | 18 | 0.32% |
| Total votes | | 5,596 | 100% |
| Democratic hold | | | |

=== District 24 ===
2018 Alaska's House district 24 election
| Party | Candidate | Votes | % |
|---|---|---|---|
| Republican | Chuck Kopp (incumbent) | 4,933 | 60.25% |
| Democratic | Sue Levi | 3,224 | 39.37% |
| Write-ins | Write-ins | 31 | 0.41% |
| Total votes | | 8,188 | 100% |
| Republican hold | | | |

=== District 25 ===
2018 Alaska's House district 25 election
| Party | Candidate | Votes | % |
|---|---|---|---|
| Republican | Josh Revak | 3,637 | 51.9% |
| Democratic | Pat Higgins | 3,356 | 47.89% |
| Write-ins | Write-ins | 15 | 0.21% |
| Total votes | | 7,008 | 100% |
| Republican hold | | | |

=== District 26 ===
2018 Alaska's House district 26 election
| Party | Candidate | Votes | % |
|---|---|---|---|
| Republican | Laddie Shaw | 4,826 | 62.31% |
| Democratic | Anita Thorne | 2,886 | 37.26% |
| Write-ins | Write-ins | 33 | 0.43% |
| Total votes | | 7,745 | 100% |
| Republican hold | | | |

=== District 27 ===
2018 Alaska's House district 27 election
| Party | Candidate | Votes | % |
|---|---|---|---|
| Republican | Lance Pruitt (incumbent) | 3,867 | 50.89% |
| Democratic | Liz Snyder | 3,686 | 48.51% |
| Write-ins | Write-ins | 45 | 0.41% |
| Total votes | | 7,598 | 100% |
| Republican hold | | | |

=== District 28 ===
2018 Alaska's House district 28 election
| Party | Candidate | Votes | % |
|---|---|---|---|
| Republican | Jennifer Johnston (incumbent) | 5,557 | 54.43% |
| Democratic | Amber Lee | 4,628 | 45.33% |
| Write-ins | Write-ins | 24 | 0.24% |
| Total votes | | 10,209 | 100% |
| Republican hold | | | |

=== District 29 ===
2018 Alaska's House district 29 election
| Party | Candidate | Votes | % |
|---|---|---|---|
| Republican | Ben Carpenter | 5,550 | 68.78% |
| Democratic | Amber Lee | 2,487 | 30.82% |
| Write-ins | Write-ins | 32 | 0.4% |
| Total votes | | 8,069 | 100% |
| Republican hold | | | |

=== District 30 ===
2018 Alaska's House district 30 election
| Party | Candidate | Votes | % |
|---|---|---|---|
| Republican | Gary Knopp (incumbent) | 6,187 | 93.83% |
| Write-ins | Write-ins | 407 | 6.17% |
| Total votes | | 6,594 | 100% |
| Republican hold | | | |

=== District 31 ===
2018 Alaska's House district 31 election
| Party | Candidate | Votes | % |
|---|---|---|---|
| Republican | Sarah Vance | 5,243 | 54.76% |
| Independent | Paul Seaton (incumbent) (Note: Elected as a Republican in 2002 and in every election until 2016, Seaton caucused with the Democrats in the 30th legislature. Facing a competitive Republican primary, Seaton instead filed to run for reelection as an independent and ran in the Democratic primary, winning the nomination.) | 4,236 | 44.26% |
| Write-ins | Write-ins | 91 | 0.95% |
| Total votes | | 9,570 | 100% |
| Republican hold | | | |

=== District 32 ===
2018 Alaska's House district 32 election
| Party | Candidate | Votes | % |
|---|---|---|---|
| Republican | Louise Stutes (incumbent) | 3,261 | 53.11% |
| Democratic | Dennis Harris | 2,072 | 33.75% |
| Independent | Sandra Katelnikoff-Lester | 767 | 12.49% |
| Write-ins | Write-ins | 40 | 0.65% |
| Total votes | | 6,140 | 100% |
| Republican hold | | | |

=== District 33 ===
2018 Alaska's House district 33 election
| Party | Candidate | Votes | % |
|---|---|---|---|
| Democratic | Sara Hannan | 5,073 | 56.54% |
| Independent | Chris Dimond | 3,855 | 42.96% |
| Write-ins | Write-ins | 45 | 0.5% |
| Total votes | | 8,973 | 100% |
| Democratic hold | | | |

=== District 34 ===
2018 Alaska's House district 34 election
| Party | Candidate | Votes | % |
|---|---|---|---|
| Democratic | Andi Story | 4,650 | 53.0% |
| Republican | Jerry Nankervis | 4,110 | 46.85% |
| Write-ins | Write-ins | 13 | 0.15% |
| Total votes | | 8,773 | 100% |
| Democratic hold | | | |

=== District 35 ===
2018 Alaska's House district 35 election
| Party | Candidate | Votes | % |
|---|---|---|---|
| Democratic | Jonathan Kreiss-Tomkins (incumbent) | 4,480 | 56.86% |
| Republican | Richard Wein | 3,367 | 42.73% |
| Write-ins | Write-ins | 32 | 0.40% |
| Total votes | | 7,879 | 100% |
| Democratic hold | | | |

=== District 36 ===
2018 Alaska's House district 36 election
| Party | Candidate | Votes | % |
|---|---|---|---|
| Independent | Daniel Ortiz (incumbent) | 4,256 | 59.77% |
| Republican | Robert W. Siversten | 2,793 | 39.22% |
| Write-ins | Write-ins | 72 | 1.01% |
| Total votes | | 7,121 | 100% |
| Independent hold | | | |

=== District 37 ===
2018 Alaska's House district 37 election
| Party | Candidate | Votes | % |
|---|---|---|---|
| Democratic | Bryce Edgmon (incumbent) | 2,911 | 64.52% |
| Republican | William W. Weatherby | 1,588 | 35.2% |
| Write-ins | Write-ins | 13 | 0.29% |
| Total votes | | 4,512 | 100% |
| Democratic hold | | | |

=== District 38 ===
2018 Alaska's House district 38 election
| Party | Candidate | Votes | % |
|---|---|---|---|
| Democratic | Tiffany Zulkosky (incumbent) | 2,843 | 55.64% |
| Republican | Darren Deacon | 2,252 | 44.07% |
| Write-ins | Write-ins | 15 | 0.29% |
| Total votes | | 5,110 | 100% |
| Democratic hold | | | |

=== District 39 ===
2018 Alaska's House district 39 election
| Party | Candidate | Votes | % |
|---|---|---|---|
| Democratic | Neal Foster (incumbent) | 4,963 | 95.92% |
| Write-ins | Write-ins | 211 | 4.08% |
| Total votes | | 5,174 | 100% |
| Democratic hold | | | |

=== District 40 ===
2018 Alaska's House district 40 election
| Party | Candidate | Votes | % |
|---|---|---|---|
| Democratic | John Lincoln (incumbent) | 2,404 | 59.77% |
| Independent | Patrick Savok | 878 | 21.83% |
| Independent | Leanna Mack | 711 | 17.68% |
| Write-ins | Write-ins | 29 | 0.72% |
| Total votes | | 4,022 | 100% |
| Democratic hold | | | |

== See also ==
- 2018 Alaska State Senate election
