= 32nd Alaska State Legislature =

Term of state legislature in Alaska, US

←	31st Alaska State Legislature	33rd Alaska State Legislature	→

Overview
- Legislative body: Alaska Legislature
- Jurisdiction: Alaska, United States
- Meeting place: Alaska State Capitol
- Term: January 19, 2021 – January 17, 2023

Alaska Senate
- Members: 20 Senators
- Senate President: Peter Micciche (R)
- Majority Leader: Shelley Hughes (R)
- Minority Leader: Tom Begich (D)
- Party control: Republican

Alaska House of Representatives
- Members: 40 Representatives
- Speaker of the House: Louise Stutes (R-C)
- Majority Leader: Chris Tuck (D-C)
- Minority Leader: Cathy Tilton (R)
- Party control: Multipartisan coalition

The 32nd Alaska State Legislature represented the legislative branch of Alaska's state government from January 19, 2021 to January 17, 2023. Its initial 60-person membership was set by the 2020 Alaska elections. The Alaska Senate was led by a 14-member majority that included 13 Republicans and one Democratic member.

== Senate ==
Alaska State Senate 32nd Alaska Legislature, 2021–22
District	Name	Party	Residence	Assumed office	Next election^{a}
A	Scott Kawasaki	Dem	Fairbanks	2019	2022
B	Robert Myers	Rep	North Pole	2021	2024
C	Click Bishop	Rep	Fairbanks	2013	2024
D	David Wilson	Rep	Wasilla	2017	2024
E	Mike Shower	Rep	Wasilla	2019↑	2022
F	Shelley Hughes	Rep	Palmer	2017	2024
G	Lora Reinbold	Rep	Eagle River	2018	2022
H	Bill Wielechowski	Dem	Anchorage	2007	2024
I	Elvi Gray-Jackson	Dem	Anchorage	2019	2022
J	Tom Begich	Dem	Anchorage	2017	2024
K	Mia Costello	Rep	Anchorage	2015	2022
L	Natasha von Imhof	Rep	Anchorage	2017	2024
M	Josh Revak	Rep	Anchorage	2019↑	2024
N	Roger Holland	Rep	Anchorage	2021	2024
O	Peter Micciche	Rep	Soldotna	2013	2022
P	Gary Stevens	Rep	Kodiak	2003↑	2024
Q	Jesse Kiehl	Dem	Juneau	2019	2022
R	Bert Stedman	Rep	Sitka	2003↑	2024
S	Lyman Hoffman	Dem	Bethel	1995	2024
T	Donny Olson	Dem	Golovin	2001	2024

↑: Senator was originally appointed
^a : Terms listed as up for election in 2024 are subject to truncation by proclamation of the Alaska Redistricting Board.

== House ==
Alaska House of Representatives 32nd Alaska Legislature, 2021–22
District	Name	Party	Residence	Assumed office
1	Bart LeBon	Rep	Fairbanks	2019
2	Steve Thompson	Rep	Fairbanks	2011
3	Mike Prax	Rep	North Pole	2019↑
4	Grier Hopkins	Dem	Fairbanks	2019
5	Adam Wool	Dem	Fairbanks	2015
6	Mike Cronk	Rep	Tok	2021
7	Christopher Kurka	Rep	Wasilla	2021
8	Kevin McCabe	Rep	Big Lake	2021
9	George Rauscher	Rep	Sutton	2017
10	David Eastman	Rep	Wasilla	2017
11	DeLena Johnson	Rep	Palmer	2017
12	Cathy Tilton	Rep	Wasilla	2015
13	Ken McCarty	Rep	Eagle River	2021
14	Kelly Merrick	Rep	Eagle River	2019
15	David Nelson	Rep	Anchorage	2021
16	Ivy Spohnholz	Dem	Anchorage	2016↑
17	Andy Josephson	Dem	Anchorage	2013
18	Harriet Drummond	Dem	Anchorage	2013
19	Geran Tarr	Dem	Anchorage	2013
20	Zack Fields	Dem	Anchorage	2019
21	Matt Claman	Dem	Anchorage	2015
22	Sara Rasmussen	Rep	Anchorage	2019
23	Chris Tuck	Dem	Anchorage	2009
24	Tom McKay	Rep	Anchorage	2021
25	Calvin Schrage	Ind	Anchorage	2021
26	Laddie Shaw	Rep	Anchorage	2019
27	Liz Snyder	Dem	Anchorage	2021
28	James Kaufman	Rep	Anchorage	2021
29	Ben Carpenter	Rep	Nikiski	2019
30	Ron Gillham	Rep	Kenai	2021
31	Sarah Vance	Rep	Homer	2019
32	Louise Stutes	Rep	Kodiak	2015
33	Sara Hannan	Dem	Juneau	2019
34	Andi Story	Dem	Juneau	2019
35	Jonathan Kreiss-Tomkins	Dem	Sitka	2013
36	Dan Ortiz	Ind	Ketchikan	2015
37	Bryce Edgmon	Dem	Dillingham	2007
38	Tiffany Zulkosky	Dem	Bethel	2018↑
39	Neal Foster	Dem	Nome	2009↑
40	Josiah Patkotak	Ind	Utqiagvik	2021

↑: Representative was originally appointed

=== Composition ===
↓
18	1	2	4	15
Republican	R	R	Ind.	Democratic

Affiliation	Party (Shading indicates majority caucus)						Total	
Affiliation	Republican			Democratic		Ind	Total	Vacant
End of 28th Legislature	26			4	10	0	40	0
Begin 29th Legislature (2015)	23			4	12	1	40	0
End of 29th (2016)	1	22		4	12	1	40	0
30th Legislature	18		3	17		2	40	0
Begin 31st Legislature	15		8	15		2	40	0
End 31st	16	1	5	15		2	39	1
Begin 32nd Legislature	20		1	15		4	40	0
February 15, 2021	19		2	15		4	40	0
February 16, 2021	18	1	2	15		4	40	0
February 17, 2021	18	1	2	1	14	4	40	0
March 19, 2021	18	1	2	15		4	40	0
Latest voting share	45%	2.5%	52.5%					

== See also ==
- List of Alaska State Legislatures
- 31st Alaska State Legislature, the legislature preceding this one
- 33rd Alaska State Legislature, the legislature following this one
- List of governors of Alaska
- List of speakers of the Alaska House of Representatives
- Alaska Legislature
- Alaska Senate
- Alaska State Senate election, 2020
- {AKLeg.gov}
