= Mike Hawker =

Mike Hawker may refer to:

- Mike Hawker (politician)
- Mike Hawker (songwriter)
- Michael Hawker, rugby union player
