= 2018 Alaska elections =

- November 6, 2018
- Turnout: 49.73% ▼

A general election was held in the state of Alaska on November 6, 2018. Primary elections were held on August 21, 2018.

Alaska voters elected the governor, lieutenant governor, and parts of the Alaska Legislature, as well as their sole member of the U.S. House of Representatives representing the at-large district.

== Federal offices ==
=== United States House of Representatives ===
2018 Alaska's at-large congressional district election
Party	Candidate	Votes	%	±%
Republican	Don Young (incumbent)	149,779	53.08%	+2.76
Independent	Alyse Galvin	131,199	46.50%	+10.48
Write-in		1,188	0.42%	+0.02
Total votes		282,166	100.00%	
Republican hold				

== State offices ==
=== Governor ===
2018 Alaska gubernatorial election
Party	Candidate	Votes	%	±%
Republican	Mike Dunleavy	145,631	51.44%	+5.56
Democratic	Mark Begich	125,739	44.41%	–3.69
Independent	Bill Walker (incumbent; withdrawn)	5,757	2.03%	–46.07
Libertarian	William Toien	5,402	1.91%	–1.30
Write-in		605	0.21%	–0.11
Total votes		283,134	100.00%	
Republican gain from Independent				

=== State legislature ===
==== Alaska Senate ====
Alaska Senate
Party	Leader	Before	After	Change
Republican	Peter Micciche	14	13	▼1
Democratic	Berta Gardner	6	7	▲1
Total		20	20	

==== Alaska House of Representatives ====
In the Alaska House of Representatives, a coalition of Democrats, independents, and defective Republicans control the chamber. Despite the Republicans gaining a majority of seats in these elections, the coalition retained their control when six Republicans joined the Democratic caucus.

Alaska House of Representatives
Party	Leader	Before	After	Change
Coalition	Bryce Edgmon	22 (Note: Consists of 17 Democrats, 3 Republicans, and 2 Independents.)	25 (Note: Consists of 16 Democrats, 8 Republicans, and 1 Independent.)	▲3
Republican	Charisse Millett	18	15	▼3
Total		40	40	

== Ballot measures ==
=== Measure 1 ===
The Salmon Habitat Protections and Permits Initiative, or simply the Alaska Ballot Measure 1, was designed to establish new requirements and a new process for permit applications, permit application reviews, and the granting of permits for any projects or activities affecting bodies of water related to the activity of anadromous fishes such as salmon and steelhead.

Results by state house district Yes: 50–60%; 60–70%; No: 50–60%; 60–70%; 70–80%

Ballot Measure 1
Choice	Votes	%
For	103,836	37.68
Against	171,711	62.32
Total	275,547	100.00
Source: Alaska Division of Elections
