= 2014 Alaska elections =

- November 4, 2014

A general election was held in the state of Alaska on November 4, 2014. Primary elections were held on August 19, 2014.

Several statewide offices as well as a U.S. Senate seat and a U.S. House seat were up for election.

== Federal offices ==
=== United States Senate ===
Incumbent Democratic senator Mark Begich was defeated by Republican Dan Sullivan.

2014 United States Senate election in Alaska
Party	Candidate	Votes	%
Republican	Dan Sullivan	135,445	47.96%
Democratic	Mark Begich (incumbent)	129,431	45.83%
Libertarian	Mark Fish	10,512	3.72%
Independent	Ted Gianoutsos	5,636	2.00%
Write-in		1,376	0.49%
Total votes		282,400	100%
Republican gain from Democratic			

=== United States House of Representatives ===
Incumbent Republican Congressman Don Young won re-election to a twenty-second term in office.

2014 Alaska's at-large congressional district election
Party	Candidate	Votes	%
Republican	Don Young (incumbent)	142,572	50.96%
Democratic	Forrest Dunbar	114,602	40.97%
Libertarian	Jim McDermott	21,290	7.61%
Write-in		1,277	0.46%
Total votes		279,741	100%

== State offices ==
=== Governor ===
Incumbent Republican Sean Parnell was defeated by Bill Walker, former Republican mayor of Valdez who ran as an independent candidate.

2014 Alaska gubernatorial election
Party	Candidate	Votes	%
Independent	Bill Walker	134,658	48.10%
Republican	Sean Parnell (incumbent)	128,435	45.88%
Libertarian	Carolyn Clift	8,985	3.21%
Constitution	J. R. Myers	6,987	2.49%
Write-in		893	0.32%
Total votes		279,958	100%
Independent gain from Republican			

=== State judiciary ===
One statewide judicial seat was up for retention: Alaska Supreme Court Justice Craig Stowers who was appointed by Governor Sean Parnell in 2009.

Results by state house district Yes: 50–60%; 60–70%; 70–80%; No: 50–60%

Justice Stowers retention, 2014
Choice	Votes	%
For	146,829	62.92
Against	86,534	37.08
Total	233,363	100.00

=== State legislature ===
==== Alaska House of Representatives ====
Alaska House of Representatives
Party	Before	After	Change
Republican	26	23	▼3
Democratic	14	16	▲2
Independent	0	1	▲1
Total	40	40	

==== Alaska Senate ====
Alaska Senate
Party	Before	After	Change
Republican	13	14	▲1
Democratic	7	6	▼1
Total	20	20	

== Ballot measures ==
Four statewide ballot measures appeared on the ballot in Alaska: one in August and three in November.

=== Measure 1 ===
The Alaska Oil Tax Cuts Veto Referendum sought to repeal a bill previously passed by the state legislature that granted tax breaks to oil companies.

Results by state house district Yes: 50–60%; 60–70%; 70–80%; No: 50–60%; 60–70%

Ballot Measure 1
Choice	Votes	%
For	89,608	47.30
Against	99,855	52.70
Total	189,463	100.00
Source: Alaska Division of Elections

=== Measure 2 ===
The Alaska Marijuana Legalization Measure sought to legalize marijuana for people aged 21 and over.

Ballot Measure 2
Choice	Votes	%
For	149,021	53.23
Against	130,924	46.77
Total	279,945	100.00
Source: Alaska Division of Elections

=== Measure 3 ===
The Alaska Minimum Wage Increase Measure sought to increase the state minimum wage from $7.75 to $9.75 and continue adjusting it for inflation in the future.

Results by state house district Yes: 50–60%; 60–70%; 70–80%; 80–90%

Ballot Measure 3
Choice	Votes	%
For	194,654	69.35
Against	86,040	30.65
Total	280,694	100.00
Source: Alaska Division of Elections

=== Measure 4 ===
The Alaska Bristol Bay Mining Ban Question would prohibit mining projects if harmful to wild salmon in fisheries reserves.

Results by state house district Yes: 50–60%; 60–70%; 70–80%

Ballot Measure 4
Choice	Votes	%
For	180,490	65.94
Against	93,212	34.06
Total	273,702	100.00
Source: Alaska Division of Elections
