= Mel Gillis =

American politician

Member of the Alaska House of Representatives from the 25th district
- In office December 2, 2019 – January 18, 2021
- Preceded by: Josh Revak
- Succeeded by: Calvin Schrage

Personal details
- Born: Bias Melvin Gillis; August 2, 1943 (age 83) Kilgore, Texas, U.S.
- Party: Republican
- Spouse: Anne (m. 1970)
- Education: Kilgore College

Bias Melvin Gillis (born August 2, 1943) is a former Republican member of the Alaska House of Representatives from the 25th district which covers neighborhoods in southeast Anchorage. He was appointed in 2019, replacing Josh Revak who was appointed to the Alaska Senate.

Gillis grew up in Texas, moved to Alaska in 1965, and worked for the Bureau of Indian Affairs. He later joined the National Guard and worked in the construction industry. He then became a hunting guide before applying for the vacate house seat.
