= 2020 Alaska elections =

- November 3, 2020
- Turnout: 60.67% ▲

Alaska state elections in 2020 were held on Tuesday, November 3, 2020. Aside from its party-run Democratic presidential primary held on April 10 (not including the Republican Party presidential primary which was cancelled by the state party), its primary elections were held on August 18, 2020.

In addition to the U.S. presidential race, Alaska voters elected the Class II U.S. Senator from Alaska, its at-large seat to the House of Representatives, 1 of 5 seats on the Alaska Supreme Court, 1 of 3 seats on the Alaska Court of Appeals, all of the seats of the Alaska House of Representatives, and 11 of 20 seats in the Alaska Senate. There were also two ballot measures which were voted on.

To vote by mail, registered Alaska voters had to request a ballot by October 24, 2020.

== Federal offices ==
=== President of the United States ===
Alaska has 3 electoral votes in the Electoral College.

2020 United States presidential election in Alaska
Party	Candidate	Votes	%	±%
Republican	Donald Trump (incumbent)	189,951	52.83	+1.55
Democratic	Joe Biden	153,778	42.77	+6.22
Libertarian	Jo Jorgensen	8,897	2.47	–3.41
Green	Jesse Ventura	2,673	0.74	–1.06
Constitution	Don Blankenship	1,127	0.31	–0.90
Independent	Brock Pierce	825	0.23	N/A
Alliance	Rocky De La Fuente	318	0.09	–0.30
Write-in		1,961	0.55	–2.34
Majority		36,173	10.06	–4.67
Total votes		359,530	100.00	
Republican win				

=== United States Class II Senate Seat ===
2020 United States Senate election in Alaska
Party	Candidate	Votes	%	±%
Republican	Dan Sullivan (incumbent)	191,112	53.90	+5.94
Independent	Al Gross	146,068	41.19	–4.64
Independence	John Howe	16,806	4.74	N/A
Write-in		601	0.17	–0.32
Majority		45,044	12.70	+10.57
Total votes		354,587	100.00	
Republican hold				

=== United States House of Representatives ===
2020 Alaska's at-large congressional district election
Party	Candidate	Votes	%	±%
Republican	Don Young (incumbent)	192,126	54.40	+1.32
Independent	Alyse Galvin	159,856	45.26	–1.24
Write-in		1,183	0.33	–0.09
Majority		32,270	9.14	+2.56
Total votes		353,165	100.00	
Republican hold				

== State offices ==
=== State judiciary ===
==== State Supreme Court ====
Incumbent Susan M. Carney was retained for a 10-year term in the state Supreme Court. She was appointed by Governor Bill Walker in 2016.

Results by state house district Yes: 50–60%; 60–70%; 70–80%; No: 50–60%

Justice Carney retention, 2020
Choice	Votes	%
For	200,598	63.03
Against	117,660	36.97
Total	318,258	100.00
Source: Alaska Division of Elections

==== Court of Appeals ====
Incumbent Tracey Wollenberg was retained for her seat in the state Court of Appeals. She was appointed by Bill Walker in 2017.

Results by state house district Yes: 50–60%; 60–70%; 70–80%; No: 50–60%

Judge Wollenberg retention, 2020
Choice	Votes	%
For	203,012	64.82
Against	110,177	35.18
Total	313,189	100.00
Source: Alaska Division of Elections

=== State legislature ===
All 40 seats of the Alaska House of Representatives and 11 of 20 seats of the Alaska Senate were up for election. The outcome of this election could affect partisan balance during post-census congressional redistricting.

==== State senate ====
Before the election the composition of the Alaska Senate was:

Party	# of seats
Majority caucus	14
Republican	13
Democratic	1
Minority caucus	6
Democratic	6
Total	20 (Note: Including 1 vacancy)

The composition of the Alaska Senate remained the same after the election. Two Republicans lost reelection.

==== House of Representatives ====
Before the election the composition of the Alaska State House was:

Party	# of seats
Majority caucus	23
Democratic	15
Republican	5
Independent	2
Minority caucus	16
Republican	16
Non-caucusing (Republican)	1
Total	40 (Note: Including 1 vacancy)

After the election the composition of the Alaska State House was:

Party	# of seats
Majority caucus	22
Democratic	15
Republican	4
Independent	2
Minority caucus	18
Republican	18
Non-caucusing (Republican)	1
Total	40 (Note: Including 1 vacancy)

== Ballot measures ==
=== Measure 1 ===
The North Slope Oil Production Tax Increase Initiative would increase taxation on production of oil in the North Slope in fields which have already produced at least 400 million barrels of oil and produced at least 40,000 barrels in the last year.

==== Polling ====
Poll source	Date(s) administered	Sample size (Note: Key: A – all adults RV – registered voters LV – likely voters V – unclear)	Margin of error	For Ballot Measure 1	Against Ballot Measure 1	Undecided
Alaska Survey Research	September 26 – October 4, 2020	696 (LV)	–	36%	40%	24%

==== Results ====
Results by state house district Yes: 50–60%; 60–70%; No: 50–60%; 60–70%; 70–80%

Ballot Measure 1
Choice	Votes	%
For	145,392	42.14
Against	199,667	57.86
Total	345,059	100.00
Source: Alaska Division of Elections

=== Measure 2 ===
The Top-Four Ranked-Choice Voting and Campaign Finance Laws Initiative would mandate the following changes to the state's election policies: increasing disclosure requirements for "dark money" political contributions of greater than $2000 which themselves are derived from donations to the donors, replacing all partisan primaries with one open primary ballot (and allowing the top four vote-getters to proceed to the general election) and implementing ranked-choice voting in all general elections.

==== Polling ====
Poll source	Date(s) administered	Sample size	Margin of error	For Ballot Measure 2	Against Ballot Measure 2	Undecided
Alaska Survey Research	September 26 – October 4, 2020	696 (LV)	–	51%	30%	19%
Mercury Analytics/Claster Consulting /Alaskans for Better Elections (Note: This poll's sponsor, Alaskans for Better Elections, endorsed the measure prior to the poll's sampling period)	September 22–27, 2020	803 (LV)	± 3.5%	59%	17%	24%

==== Results ====
Ballot Measure 2
Choice	Votes	%
For	174,032	50.55
Against	170,251	49.45
Total	344,283	100.00
Source: Alaska Division of Elections

== See also ==
- Bilingual elections requirement for Alaska (per Voting Rights Act Amendments of 2006)

== Notes ==
Partisan clients
