= Berta Gardner =

American politician (born 1954)

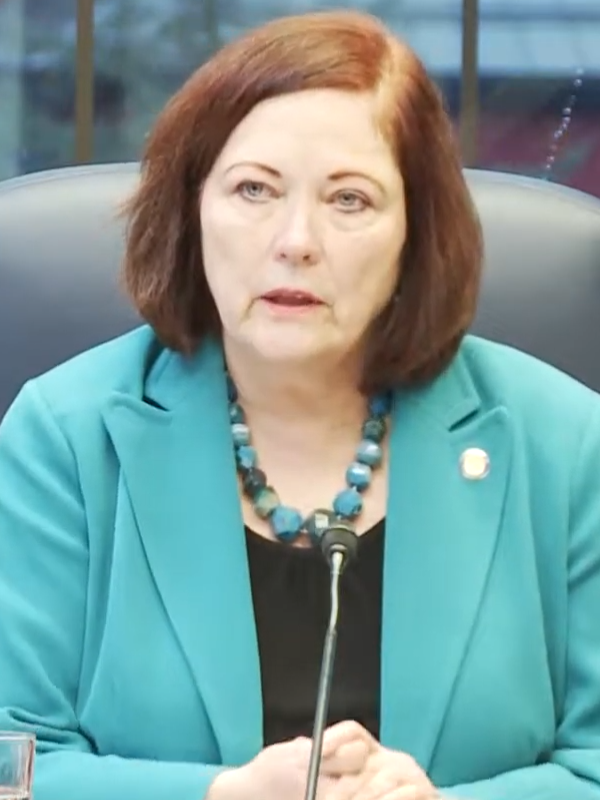
- Gardner in 2017

Minority Leader of the Alaska Senate
- In office January 17, 2015 – January 15, 2019
- Preceded by: Hollis French
- Succeeded by: Tom Begich

Member of the Alaska Senate from the I district
- In office January 15, 2013 – January 15, 2019
- Preceded by: Johnny Ellis
- Succeeded by: Elvi Gray-Jackson

Member of the Alaska House of Representatives from the 24th district
- In office January 17, 2005 – January 15, 2013
- Preceded by: Cheryll Heinze
- Succeeded by: Charisse Millett

Personal details
- Born: April 12, 1954 (age 72) Salt Lake City, Utah, U.S.
- Party: Democratic
- Spouse: Michael
- Children: 3
- Education: University of California, Riverside (BS)

Alberta Gardner (born April 12, 1954) is an American politician in the U.S. state of Alaska. She served as a Democratic member of the Alaska Legislature for fourteen years, from 2005 to 2019. Serving in both houses, the House and Senate, she represented midtown Anchorage. She was the Senate's minority leader for the last four years of her tenure.

Alaska Senate
Preceded by Hollis French	Minority Leader of the Alaska Senate; 2015–2019	Succeeded by Tom Begich
