= Sara Rasmussen =

American politician (born 1990)

Member of the Alaska House of Representatives from the 22nd District
- In office January 16, 2019 – January 2023
- Preceded by: Jason Grenn
- Succeeded by: Stanley Wright

Personal details
- Born: 1990 (age 35–36) Anchorage, Alaska, U.S.
- Party: Republican
- Spouse: Alex Rasmussen
- Children: 3

Sara Rasmussen (born 1990) is an American politician from Alaska. A Republican, she was a member of the Alaska House of Representatives, representing District 22.

== Early life and career ==
Rasmussen has a real estate background. She also served on the Sand Lake Community Council.

== Political career ==
Rasmussen defeated incumbent Jason Grenn in the 2018 election.

Sara served two terms in the Alaska House of Representatives from 2019–2023, where she sat on key committees including House Finance, Resources, Labor and Commerce, Transportation, and Energy.

Honorary titles
Preceded by Jonathan Kreiss-Tomkins	Youngest member of the Alaska House of Representatives; 2019–	Succeeded by Current
