= Liz Vazquez =

American politician

Liz Vasquez

Member of the Alaska House of Representatives from the 22nd District
- In office January 20, 2015 – January 17, 2017
- Preceded by: Mia Costello
- Succeeded by: Jason Grenn

Personal details
- Born: New York City, New York, U.S.
- Party: Republican
- Spouse: Mark R. Davis
- Children: 1
- Education: Cornell University (J.D.); Alaska Pacific University (M.B.A.); University at Albany (B.A.)
- Occupation: politician, attorney, judge

Elizabeth Vazquez is an American politician from Alaska. A Republican, she was a member of the Alaska House of Representatives, serving from 2015 until 2017, after she lost her bid for reelection to Jason Grenn. She was elected to the House seat vacated by Mia Costello in 2014, when Costello was elected to the Alaska State Senate.

Vazquez represented West Anchorage in the House of Representatives. She was an unsuccessful candidate for the Senate seat held by Hollis French in 2012 and for the Anchorage Assembly in 2010. She previously served as Alaska's assistant attorney general, worked for the United States Department of the Treasury, and served as an administrative law judge. She has two master's degrees in business administration and a juris doctor.

== Personal life ==
Vazquez was born in New York City. She is of Puerto Rican descent and speaks English as her second language. She spent time growing up in both New York City and Puerto Rico before moving to Alaska in 1983. She is married with one daughter.

== Electoral history ==
Nonpartisan primary
Party	Candidate	Votes	%
Democratic	Matt Claman (incumbent)	4,036	60.1
Republican	Thomas McKay (withdrew)	1,393	20.7
Republican	Liz Vazquez	1,287	19.2
Total votes		6,716	100.0

2024 Alaska Senate General election
Party	Candidate	Votes	%
Democratic	Matt Claman (incumbent)	9,924	55.24
Republican	Liz Vazquez	7,989	44.47
Write-in		53	0.3
Total votes		17,966	100.0
Democratic hold			
Coalition hold			
