= Lora Reinbold =

American politician (born 1964)

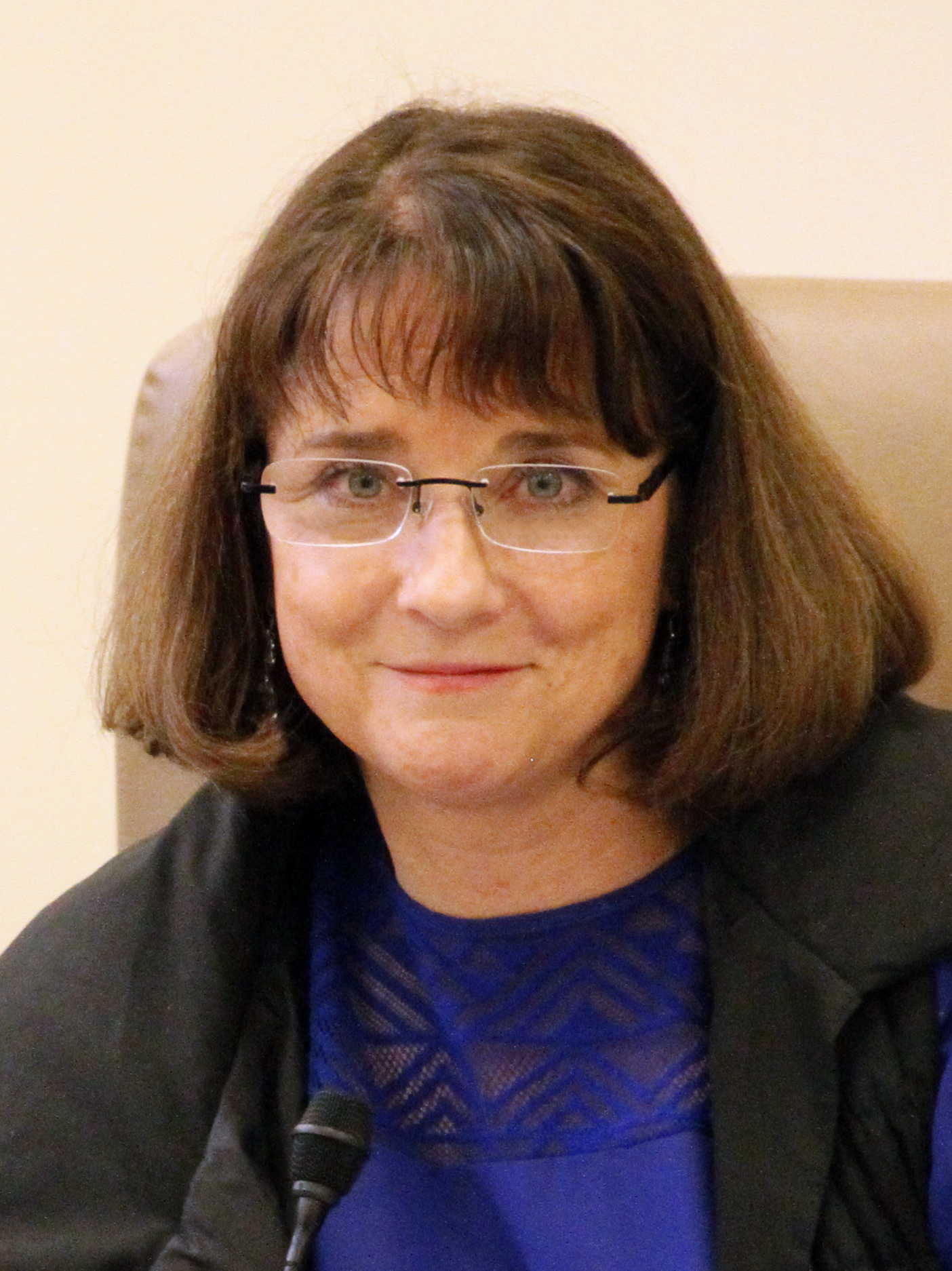
- Reinbold in 2019

Member of the Alaska Senate from the G district
- In office January 15, 2019 – January 17, 2023
- Preceded by: Anna MacKinnon
- Succeeded by: Cathy Giessel (Redistricting)

Member of the Alaska House of Representatives
- In office January 15, 2013 – January 15, 2019
- Preceded by: Anna Fairclough
- Succeeded by: Kelly Merrick
- Constituency: 26th (2013–2015); 14th (2015–2019)

Personal details
- Born: April 30, 1964 (age 62) Fairbanks, Alaska, U.S.
- Party: Republican
- Spouse: Eric Reinbold
- Children: 2
- Education: University of Alaska, Anchorage; Oral Roberts University (BS)
- Website: Official website

Lora H. Reinbold (born April 30, 1964) is an American politician who was a member of the Alaska Senate. She was a member of the Alaska House from 2013 to 2019, representing District 26. In 2018, Reinbold was elected to the Alaska State Senate representing the G district. She served in the State Senate from 2019 until retiring in 2023. From 2015 to the end of her tenure, Reinbold was the only member of the Alaska State Legislature unaffiliated with a caucus organization, as she was ejected from the Republican-led majority caucus in March 2015.

== Early life ==
Lora H. Reinbold was born in Fairbanks, Alaska on April 30, 1964. Her family moved from Clear to Anchorage when she was about five years old. She graduated from East Anchorage High School in 1982. Reinbold earned her BS in business administration from Oral Roberts University in 1987. She also attended the University of Alaska Anchorage in 1985 and 2001.

== Career ==
=== Health care ===
Reinbold worked as an operations manager at Medical Park Family Care. She also worked as an office manager at NME Hospitals (now Tenet Healthcare), a district manager for Bristol Myers Squibb, and a salesperson for Johnson & Johnson/Centecor Pharmaceuticals.

=== Legislature ===
On March 13, 2015, Reinbold voted against an operating budget put forward by the House majority caucus, in violation of caucus rules. She argued that the draft budget did not make steep enough cuts to the University of Alaska system and was, in effect, not conservative enough. On March 16, the Republican leadership of the state House (Speaker Mike Chenault, Craig Johnson, and Charisse Millett) removed Reinbold from the majority caucus for her vote and stripped her of most of her committee assignments. Her office staff was also cut from four to one.

On April 27, 2015, Reinbold voted against the operating budget again. The dissenters left the majority caucus short of the three-fourths majority needed to approve tapping Alaska's budget reserve to cover a $3.2 million deficit.

=== COVID-19 ===
==== COVID-19 diagnosis ====
On October 12, 2021, Reinbold posted on her Facebook page that she had tested positive for COVID-19.

==== Alaska Airlines ban ====
In November 2020, Reinbold refused to resume wearing a mask after eating during a flight. An Alaska Airlines policy, as well as a federal regulation, required passengers to wear masks except while eating or drinking. She wrote on social media, "Mask bullies in full force on Alaskans Airlines- all because a scaredy cat Karen whined loudly and was a Tattle tail when I took my dumb worthless suffocating mask off, a bit longer than she wanted, for my food and drink." The airline's policy followed the Centers for Disease Control's recommendations. In April 2021, Alaska Airlines banned Reinbold from its flights, citing "her continued refusal to comply with employee instruction regarding the current mask policy."

In April 2021, shortly after the ban, Reinbold traveled to Juneau overland through Canada and then by marine ferry. In September 2021, Reinbold said she could not reach Juneau because the only other air route from Anchorage to Juneau (a Delta flight that connected in Seattle) is seasonal and discontinued that month; Alaska Airlines is the only carrier that makes the route year-round. She sought permission to be excused from attending the legislative session. In April 2023, Reinbold filed a lawsuit against Alaska Airlines and its employees citing a medical condition prevented her from following the mask requirement. Her lawsuit was dismissed in February 2024. The United States Court of Appeals for the Ninth Circuit upheld the dismissal in June 2026.

==== Promotion of COVID-19 disinformation and opposition to COVID-19 health measures ====
Reinbold has frequently posted COVID-19 misinformation on Facebook, where she promoted the use of hydroxychloroquine and ivermectin and expresses vehement opposition to face-covering and vaccine mandates. In November 2020, Reinbold said that she did not believe clinical evidence in support of masks' effectiveness at preventing the spread of COVID-19. She disagreed with Governor Mike Dunleavy, who wrote, "It is lamentable that the good citizens of Eagle River and Chugiak are deprived of meaningful representation by the actions of the person holding the office of Senator." He continued, "I will not continue to subject the public resources of the State of Alaska to the mockery of a charade, disguised as public purpose." Reinbold has criticized Dunleavy for issuing pandemic-related disaster declarations during a period when the legislature was not in session, and has protested health restrictions imposed by local governments, airlines and the legislature, including mask requirements.

Reinbold has also had combative exchanges with Alaska's health commissioner. As Senate Judiciary Committee chair, she held hearings highlighting testimony from witnesses who questioned masks' usefulness and the consequences of government emergency orders. Though the committee had no COVID-19-related legislation before it, the pandemic became a major focus in hearings.

Despite the recommendations of Alaska health officials who have said that wearing masks and following measures like social distancing help slow the spread of COVID-19, Reinbold has accused Dunleavy's administration of being "wild" about what she termed "these experimental" COVID-19 vaccines and "bragging over 100,000 Alaskans have gotten them", and characterized the administration as seeking disaster declarations in order to get mass vaccination clinics.

==== Removal of committee chairmanship and Capitol ban ====
On March 8, 2021, Reinbold left a Senate subcommittee meeting after the chair told her that she was required to wear a mask. The next day, Capitol security escorted her out of a House Health and Social Services Committee meeting because she refused to wear a mask. She was banned from most of the Capitol until she follows the COVID-19 rules.

On April 19, 2021, members of the Alaska Senate removed Reinbold as chair of the Senate Judiciary Committee by a 17–1 vote.

=== Elections ===
2012 redistricting combined the Eagle River Valley and Southfork portions of former District 32 (represented by Republican Mike Hawker) and a portion of former District 17 (represented by Republican Anna Fairclough), creating a new District 26. Anna Fairclough, the new district's only incumbent resident, chose to run instead for a newly configured Senate seat, leaving the new District 26 seat open. Reinbold won the three-way August 28 Republican primary with 1,610 votes (46.15%), and won the November 6 general election with 6,903 votes (72.53%) against Democratic nominee Roberta Goughnour.

== Personal life ==
Reinbold is married to Eric Reinbold. They have two children.

== Notes ==
1.These claims were made despite the fact that COVID-19 vaccines are safe and effective, and no steps were skipped during the clinical trials.
