= Josh Revak =

American politician

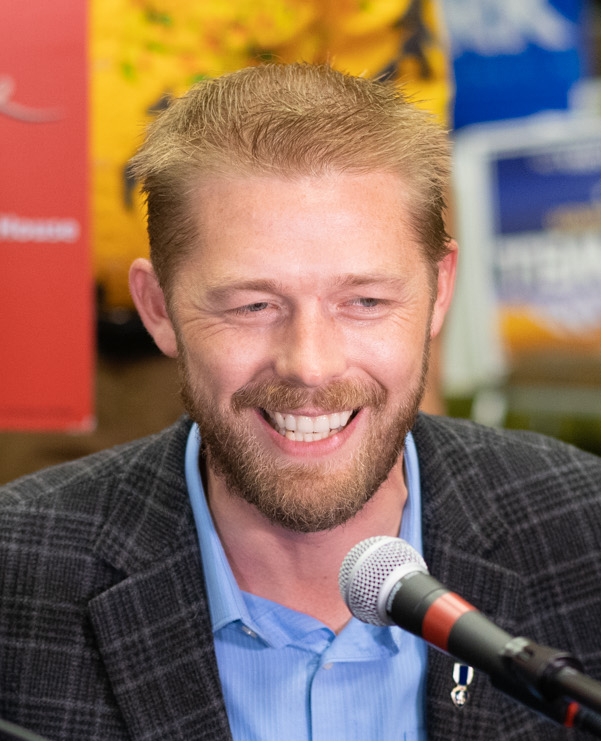

Member of the Alaska Senate from the M district
- In office November 2, 2019 – January 17, 2023
- Appointed by: Mike Dunleavy
- Preceded by: Chris Birch
- Succeeded by: James Kaufman (District M)

Member of the Alaska House of Representatives from the 25th district
- In office January 15, 2019 – November 2, 2019
- Preceded by: Charisse Millett
- Succeeded by: Mel Gillis

Personal details
- Born: Joshua Carl Revak; January 21, 1981 (age 45) Two Harbors, Minnesota, U.S.
- Party: Republican
- Education: Alaska Pacific University (MBA)

Military service
- Allegiance: United States
- Branch/service: United States Army
- Years of service: 2001–2008
- Battles/wars: Iraq War

Joshua Carl Revak (born January 21, 1981) is an American politician who served as a member of the Alaska Senate since November 2, 2019, from January 17, 2023. Originally elected to the Alaska House of Representatives in 2018, Revak was appointed to the Senate to replace Chris Birch, whom he replaced in the House, when Birch died suddenly in August 2019.

== Early life ==
Revak was born and raised on a farm in Minnesota. He enlisted in the United States Army shortly after the September 11 attacks. After being severely wounded by a mortar attack in Iraq, Revak was honorably discharged in 2008 and returned to Minnesota.

== Career ==
In 2009, Revak moved to Alaska, where he worked in the office of Congressman Don Young, serving as his military and veterans affairs liaison and political advisor. During this time, he earned a Master of Business Administration from Alaska Pacific University. In 2018, Revak was elected to serve in the Alaska House of Representatives to represent the 25th district. After the death of incumbent Chris Birch in 2019, Revak was nominated by Governor Mike Dunleavy to fill his vacant seat in the Alaska Senate.
