= Jason Grenn =

American politician (born 1981)

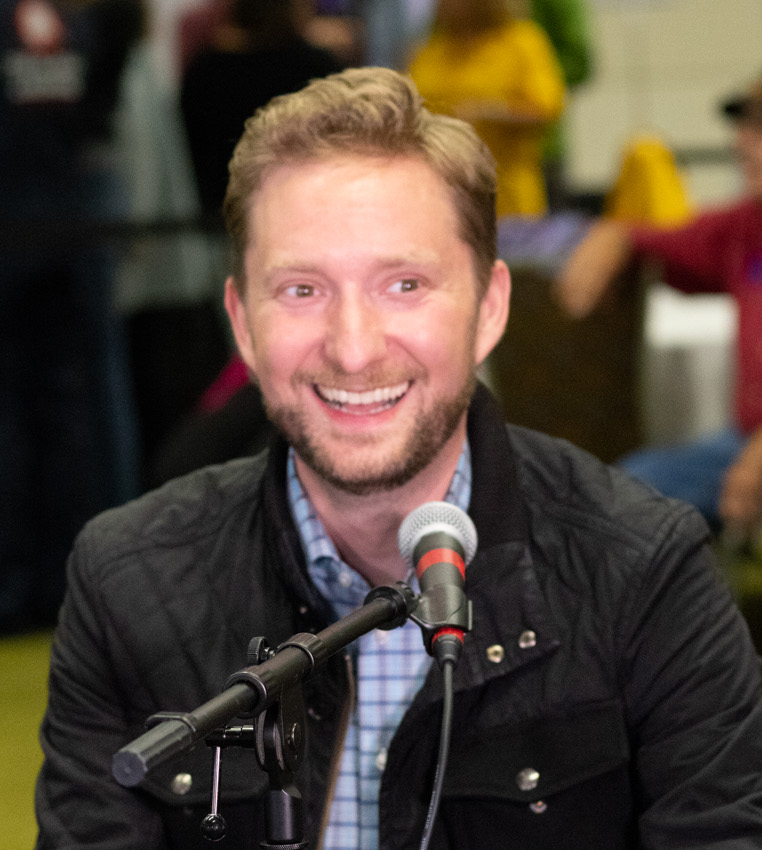
- Jason Grenn in August 2018

Member of the Alaska House of Representatives from the 22nd District
- In office January 17, 2017 – January 16, 2019
- Preceded by: Liz Vazquez
- Succeeded by: Sara Rasmussen

Personal details
- Born: 1981 (age 44–45) Anchorage, Alaska
- Party: Independent
- Children: 3
- Education: Northwest Nazarene University
- Occupation: Non-profit manager / Communications Director

Jason S. Grenn (born 1981) is an American politician from Alaska. Grenn served as an independent member of the Alaska House of Representatives from the 22nd district, which covers the Sand Lake-area neighborhoods in Anchorage, Alaska. He beat incumbent Liz Vazquez in the 2016 general election and was defeated by Sara Rasmussen in 2018.

== Political career ==
In Grenn's 2016 campaign, he has said his main objective was to help solve an Alaskan fiscal crisis; a bill said to do that failed to pass in the 2015-16 legislature. While in office, Grenn was able to pass a major legislative ethics bill (HB44) and championed economic development innovations for Alaska. He also received the 2018 "Friend of Education" award from the Anchorage Education Association and received a "Legislative Recognition" award from the Alaska Tourism Industry Association. Grenn identifies as a social liberal and fiscal conservative. After his loss to Republican Sara Rasmussen, Grenn stayed in politics as the Executive Director of Alaskans for Better Elections, a group supporting the reforms of 2020 Alaska Measure 2. Measure 2 narrowly passed in November 2020 and Alaskans for Better Elections converted into a voter education group to ensure that the reforms of Measure 2 were implemented well.

== Electoral history ==
=== 2016 ===
Alaska's House district 22 election, 2016
Party	Candidate	Votes	%
Independent	Jason Grenn	3,561	46.33%
Republican	Liz Vazquez (incumbent)	3,375	43.91%
Independence	Dustin Darden	730	9.50%
Write-ins	Write-ins	20	0.26%
Total votes		7,686	100%

=== 2018 ===
Alaska's House district 22 election, 2018
Party	Candidate	Votes	%
Republican	Sara Rasmussen	3,478	47.14%
Independent	Jason Grenn (incumbent)	3,031	41.08%
Democratic	Dustin Darden	860	11.66%
Write-ins	Write-ins	9	0.12%
Total votes		7,378	100%
Republican gain from Independent			

== Personal life ==
A lifelong resident of Anchorage, he graduated from Dimond High School in 1999 and from Northwest Nazarene University in 2003.
