= Jennifer Johnston (politician) =

American politician

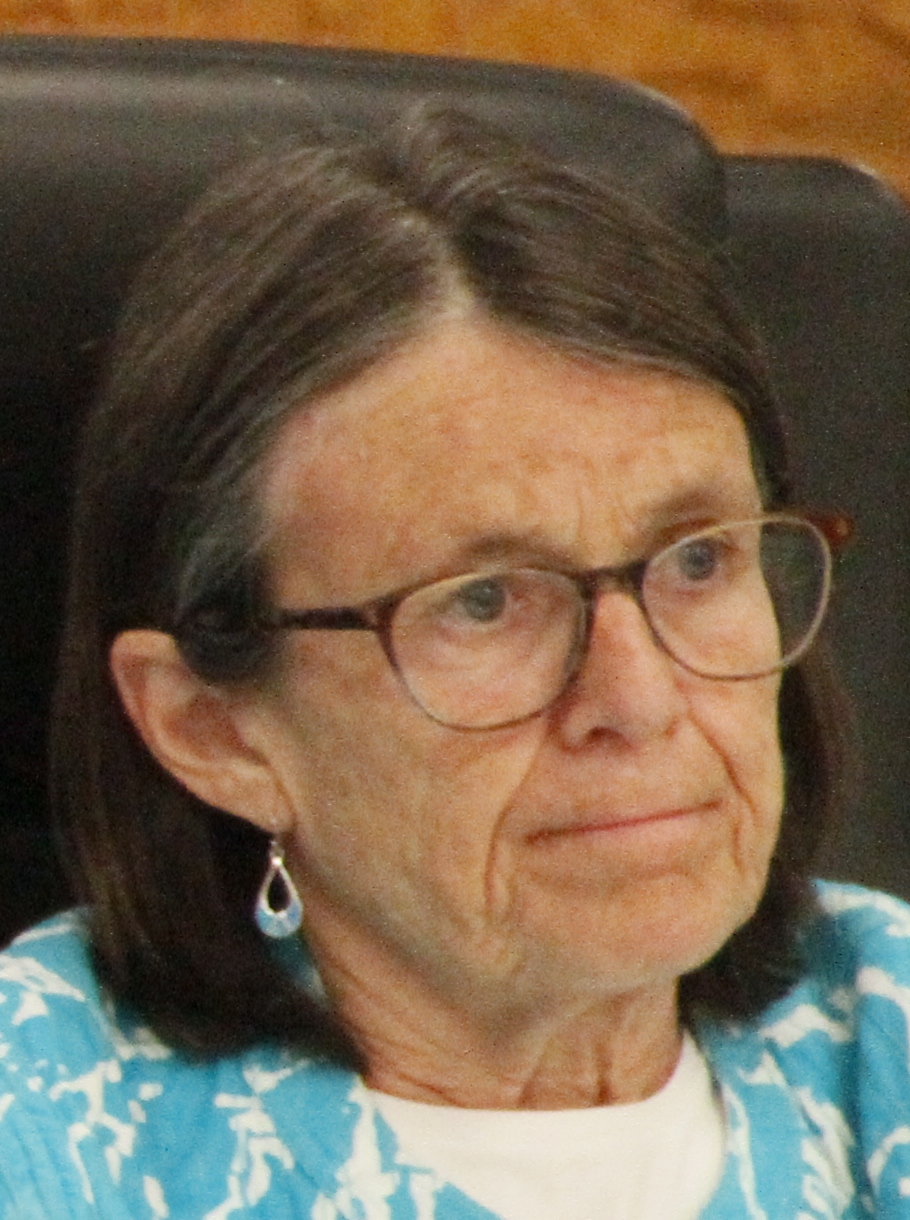

Member of the Alaska House of Representatives from the 28th district
- In office January 9, 2017 – January 11, 2021
- Preceded by: Mike Hawker
- Succeeded by: James D. Kaufman

Personal details
- Born: July 16, 1954 (age 72) Danville, Vermont, U.S.
- Party: Republican

Jennifer B. Johnston (born July 16, 1954) is an American politician from Alaska. Johnston was a Republican member of the Alaska House of Representatives and represented the 28th District. She moved to Alaska in 1976, and was a small business owner, and outdoor educator. She ran for the Republican nomination in the House but lost in the 2020 primary .

== Political career ==
Johnston served three terms in the Anchorage Assembly. In 2016 she ran for the Alaska House of Representatives to replace retiring Representative Mike Hawker. In the Republican primary, she defeated Ross Beiling. In the general election, she defeated Democrat Shirley Coté.

== Personal life ==
She was born in Danville, Vermont northeast of Montpelier. She is married to Allan Johnston and they have three children.
