= Mike Hawker (politician) =

American politician (born 1956)

Member of the Alaska House of Representatives from the 28th district
- In office January 20, 2003 – 2017
- Preceded by: Con Bunde
- Succeeded by: Jennifer Johnston

Personal details
- Born: June 25, 1956 (age 70) Manchester, Iowa, U.S.
- Party: Republican
- Spouse: Carol Carlson
- Education: University of Northern Iowa
- Occupation: Certified Public Accountant (Retired)

Mike Hawker (born June 25, 1956) is a former Republican member of the Alaska House of Representatives, representing the 28th District from 2003 to 2017. He served as Chair of the Legislative Council and the Legislative Budget & Audit Committee. He is former Co-chair of the Finance Committee and Ways and Means Committees. Mike Hawker is also a retired Certified Public Accountant and an Accounting and Management Consultant.

== Personal life ==
Mr. Hawker was born and raised in Manchester, Iowa, graduating from West Delaware High School. He received a Bachelor of Arts in Accounting and Humanities, and his public accountant certification from the University of Northern Iowa in 1979.

Representative Hawker has a wife: Carol Carlson, the daughter of John Carlson, who was mayor of the Fairbanks North Star Borough from 1968 to 1982.
