= Sam Kito III =

American politician

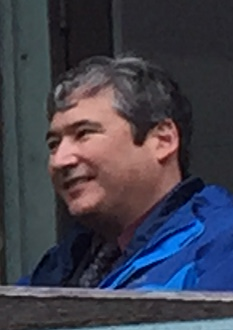

Member of the Alaska House of Representatives from the 33rd District
- In office January 20, 2015 – January 15, 2019
- Preceded by: redistricted
- Succeeded by: Sara Hannan

Member of the Alaska House of Representatives from the 32nd District
- In office February 26, 2014 – January 20, 2015
- Preceded by: Beth Kerttula
- Succeeded by: redistricted

Personal details
- Born: 1964 (age 61–62) Anchorage, Alaska
- Party: Democratic
- Education: University of Alaska (B.S., 1988)
- Occupation: Civil engineer, politician

Sam Kito III (born 1964) is an American politician from Alaska. A Democrat, he served in the Alaska House of Representatives as a representative from Juneau from 2014 to 2019.

A lobbyist and civil engineer by trade, Kito was appointed to serve out the term of Beth Kerttula in House District 32 after she resigned in early 2014. Governor Sean Parnell selected him in February from among three nominees forwarded by the Tongass Democrats, passing over Juneau Assemblyman Jesse Kiehl and Juneau School District budget committeewoman Catherine Reardon. He was sworn in on February 26, 2014 and joined the Democratic-led minority caucus.

After being appointed, Kito ran for election to a full term in House District 33 (due to redistricting) and won in a landslide over Republican Peter Dukowitz. When the legislature eliminated per diem payments for legislators who lived within 50 miles of the state capital of Juneau, he concluded that on a small legislative salary it would be very difficult to pay for his daughter's college tuition and did not run for re-election. His compensation would have been cut from $82,488 to $50,400.

== Personal life ==
Kito was born in Anchorage and lives in Juneau. He is of Tlingit and Japanese heritage. He has a daughter. Gabi. His father, Saburo Kito, Jr., is a long time lobbyist. He is named for his grandfather, Saburo (Sam) Kito, Sr, who was a resident of Petersburg and was interned in a U.S. government camp 15 miles east of Jerome, Idaho during World War II.
