= Dave Talerico =

American politician

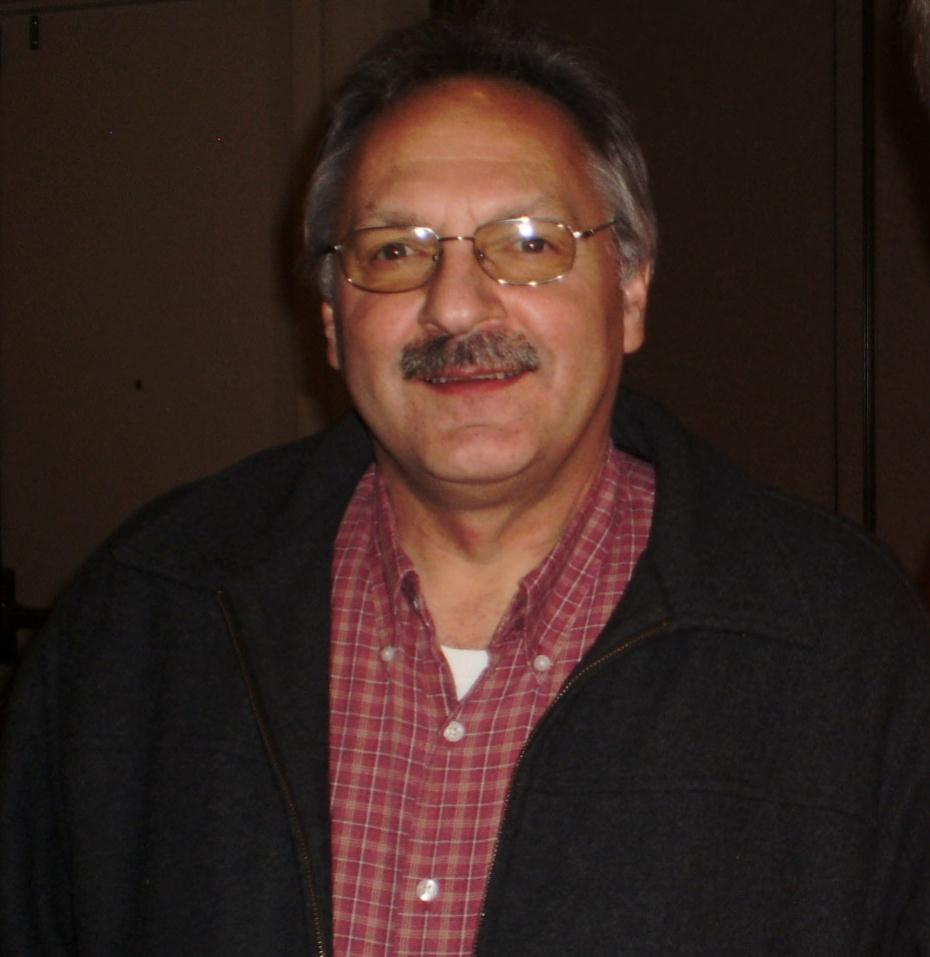

Member of the Alaska House of Representatives from the 6th District
- In office January 20, 2015 – January 19, 2021
- Preceded by: redistricted
- Succeeded by: Mike Cronk

Member of the Borough Assembly of the Denali Borough, Alaska
- In office 2013–2014

Mayor of the Denali Borough, Alaska
- In office 2002–2012
- Succeeded by: Clay Walker

Personal details
- Born: February 23, 1956 (age 70)
- Party: Republican
- Occupation: politician, miner

David M. Talerico (born February 23, 1956) is an American politician from Alaska. A Republican, he served in the Alaska House of Representatives from 2015 to 2021. He represented House District 6, a vast district in The Bush that encompasses the Denali Borough and other unincorporated areas. He is the longest-serving mayor of the Denali Borough, in office from 2002 to 2012, and briefly served on the Borough Assembly again from 2013 to 2014, when he was elected to the House of Representatives. He is a longtime resident of Healy.

Talerico previously ran unsuccessfully for a House seat against David Guttenberg, a Democrat from Fairbanks. He worked for Republican Representative Doug Isaacson as a legislative staffer from 2012 to 2013. He is a miner by trade and was the director of human resources and safety at the Usibelli Coal Mine at the time of his election to the House of Representatives in 2014.
