= Harriet Drummond =

American politician

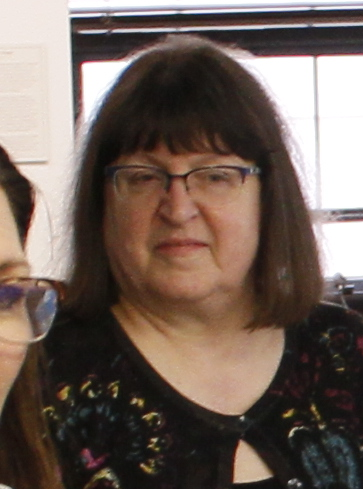

Member of the Alaska House of Representatives from the 18th district
- Incumbent
- Assumed office January 18, 2013
- Preceded by: Bill Stoltze

Personal details
- Party: Democratic
- Spouse: Elstun Lauesen (m. 2004; died 2026)
- Relations: Juanita Helms (sister-in-law)
- Education: Cornell University
- Profession: Graphic designer
- Website: harrietdrummond.com

Harriet A. Drummond (born 1952) is an American politician and a Democratic member of the Alaska House of Representatives since January 18, 2013 who has represented District 16. She ran to represent District 17 in the Alaska legislature and lost to Zack Fields, by 752 votes.

== Education ==
Drummond earned her BS from Cornell University.

== Elections ==
- 2012 With Republican Representative Bill Stoltze redistricted to District 11, Drummond won the District 16 August 28, 2012 Primary with 1,280 votes (88.58%), and won the three-way November 6, 2012 General election with 3,434 votes (56.45%) against Republican nominee Jimmy Crawford and Independent Phil Isley, who had run in the 2010 election.
