= Chris Tuck =

American politician (born 1966)

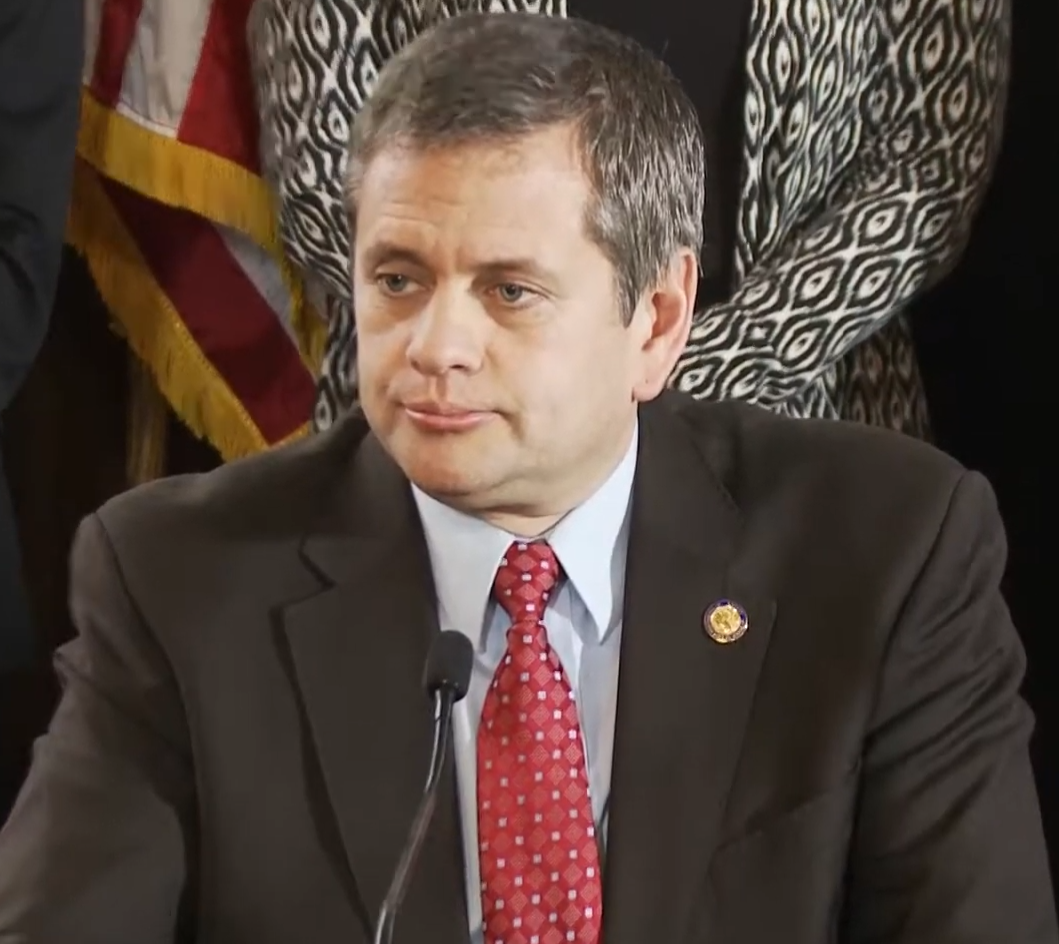
- Tuck in 2017

Majority Leader of the Alaska House of Representatives
- In office February 15, 2021 – January 19, 2023
- Preceded by: Steve M. Thompson
- Succeeded by: Dan Saddler
- In office January 20, 2017 – January 15, 2019
- Preceded by: Charisse Millett
- Succeeded by: Steve M. Thompson

Member of the Alaska House of Representatives from the 23rd district 29th district (2009–2015)
- In office January 3, 2009 – January 19, 2023
- Preceded by: Ralph Samuels
- Succeeded by: Jamie Allard (redistricting)

Personal details
- Born: July 9, 1966 (age 60) Taft, California, U.S.
- Party: Democratic
- Education: Arizona State University, Tempe

Chris Tuck (born July 9, 1966) is an American politician from the state of Alaska. A member of the Democratic Party, he previously served member of the Alaska House of Representatives, representing the 23rd and 29th Districts in Anchorage from 2008 to 2023. He was the Majority Leader of the Alaska Independent Democratic Coalition. Previously, Tuck served on the Anchorage School Board. Tuck had run unsuccessfully for the State House in 2004 and 2006 before winning election in 2008.

In June 2023, Tuck announced that he would run for mayor of Anchorage in the 2024 election, he would later lose the election finishing 4th with 7.90% of the vote.

Alaska House of Representatives
Preceded by Charisse Millett	Majority Leader of the Alaska House of Representatives; 2017–2019	Succeeded by Steve M. Thompson
Preceded by Steve M. Thompson	Majority Leader of the Alaska House of Representatives; 2021–2023	Succeeded by Dan Saddler
