= Steve M. Thompson =

American politician (born 1944)

Steve Thompson
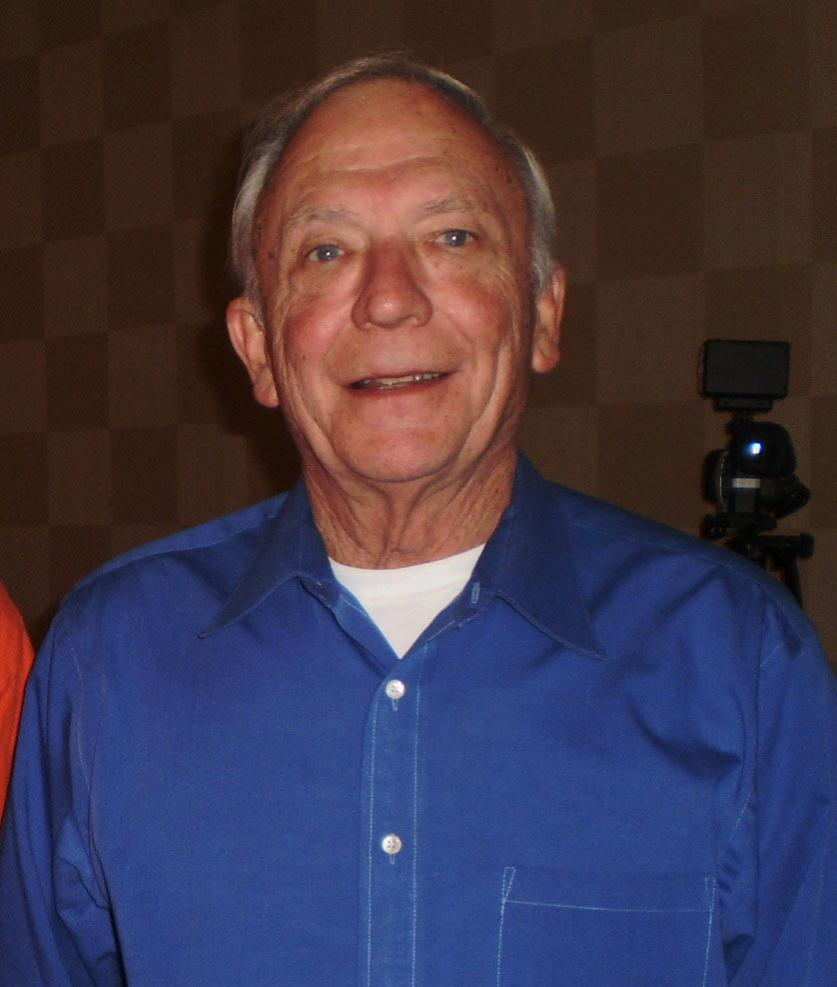
- Thompson in 2010

Majority Leader of the Alaska House of Representatives
- In office January 15, 2019 – January 19, 2021
- Preceded by: Chris Tuck
- Succeeded by: Chris Tuck

Member of the Alaska House of Representatives from the 2nd district
- Incumbent
- Assumed office January 17, 2011
- Preceded by: Jay Ramras

47th Mayor of Fairbanks
- In office 2001–2007
- Preceded by: James C. Hayes
- Succeeded by: Terry Strle

Personal details
- Born: October 27, 1944 (age 81) Cottage Grove, Oregon, U.S.
- Party: Republican
- Spouse(s): Janel Thompson (deceased 2006); Kathleen Thompson (2009–present)
- Education: Southern Oregon University

Military service
- Allegiance: United States
- Branch/service: United States Army
- Years of service: 1965–1967
- Rank: Sergeant

Stephen Max Thompson (born October 27, 1944) is a retired businessman and Republican politician from the US state of Alaska. He has been a member of the Alaska House of Representatives from District 2 in Fairbanks since 2011. He previously served as mayor of Fairbanks from 2001 to 2007.

== Early life ==
Steve Thompson was born in Cottage Grove, Oregon. He attended Southern Oregon College from 1963 to 1965 before joining the U.S. Army, where he attained the rank of sergeant. His last duty station was at Fort Wainwright, adjacent to Fairbanks, Alaska. After being discharged from the Army, he remained in Fairbanks and went to work for a local business, M & O Auto Parts. Thompson eventually became the president and CEO of M & O, selling it to the Schuck's Auto Supply chain in 1999.

== Political career ==
Thompson, retired from business, ran for the position of mayor of Fairbanks in 2001. The seat was open, as the incumbent, James C. Hayes, was term-limited. At the time, Thompson was manager of the Fairbanks lodge of the Benevolent and Protective Order of Elks. He defeated five other challengers, including two incumbent members of the city council, Scott Kawasaki and Charlie Rex.

Thompson was unopposed for re-election in 2004. In 2007, himself term-limited, Thompson ran for and won a seat on the city council. He resigned shortly thereafter, citing problems related to the illness and death of his wife, Janel.

Thompson ran for another open seat, this time in the Alaska House of Representatives, in 2010. The incumbent, Jay Ramras, ran unsuccessfully for lieutenant governor. In the primary, he defeated Vivian Stiver, a downtown Fairbanks merchant and city council member who ran unsuccessfully in 2007 to replace him as mayor, and 92-year-old Urban Rahoi, the owner of a large mobile home park immediately outside of Fairbanks city limits and a perennial candidate who first ran for a House seat from Fairbanks in 1962, running almost continuously for most of the period between the early 1970s and early 1990s. In the general election, he defeated John S. Brown, who had also unsuccessfully challenged Ramras in 2008.

Thompson has served 5 consecutive terms since 2010 and is currently running for his 6th term in the Alaska House of Representatives.

== Personal life ==
Thompson's first wife, Janel, died of cancer. The Fairbanks North Star Borough named parkland adjacent to the Chena River after her. Thompson married his second wife, Kathleen, in 2009. He has 5 children: Todd, Scott, Natalie, Aaron, and Max. Todd, an employee of the Fairbanks North Star Borough, was heavily involved in the political battle in Fairbanks over eliminating emissions testing during the time his father served as mayor.

Alaska House of Representatives
Preceded by Chris Tuck	Majority Leader of the Alaska House of Representatives; 2019–present	Incumbent
