= Geran Tarr =

American politician

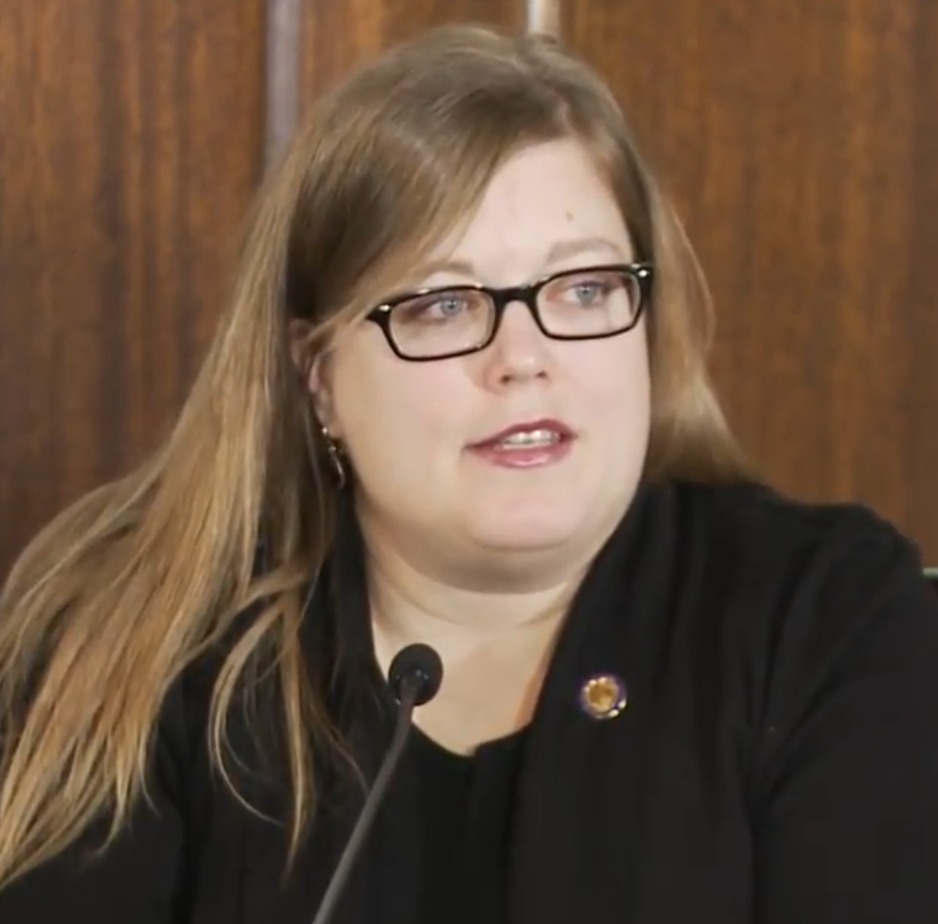
- Tarr in 2017

Member of the Alaska House of Representatives from the 19th district
- In office January 18, 2013 – January 17, 2023
- Preceded by: Anna Fairclough
- Succeeded by: Genevieve Mina

Personal details
- Born: Akron, Ohio, U.S.
- Party: Democratic
- Education: Ohio University (BS); University of Alaska Anchorage (MPA)

Geran Tarr (born in Akron, Ohio) is an American politician who served as a Democratic member of the Alaska House of Representatives for the 17th district from 2013 to 2023.

== Early life and education ==
Tarr was born in Akron, Ohio. She earned her BS in from Ohio University Ohio in botany, environmental studies, and women's studies. She then went on to earn her master's degree at the University of Alaska Anchorage in public administration with a policy analysis focus.

== Elections ==
- 2012 When Republican Representative Anna Fairclough ran for the District M senate seat and left the District 17 seat open, Tarr won the August 28, 2012 Democratic Primary with 600 votes (55.56%), and won the November 6, 2012 General election with 2,416 votes (60.31%) against Republican nominee Cean Stevens.
