= Charisse Millett =

American politician (born 1964)

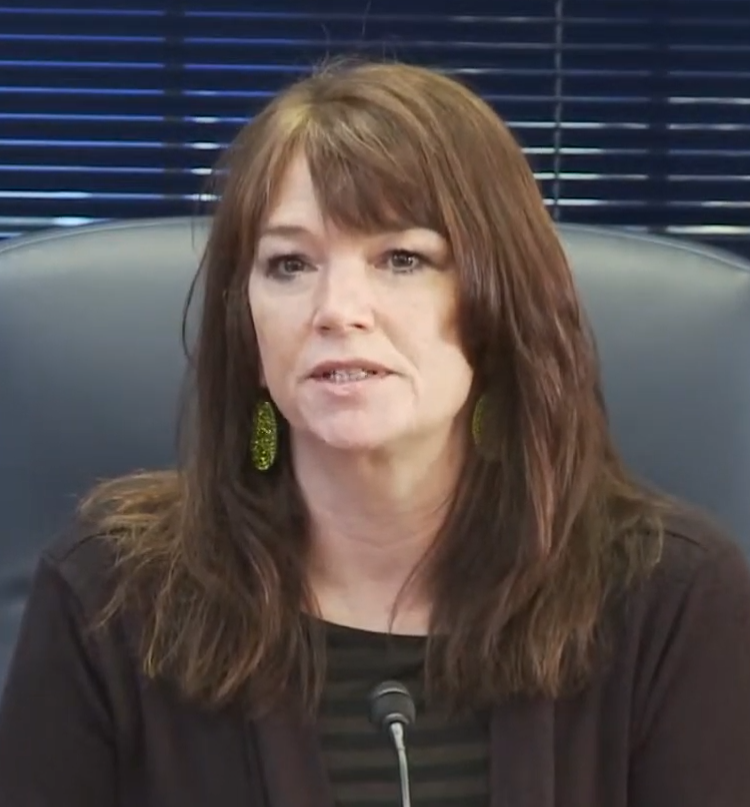

Minority Leader of the Alaska House of Representatives
- In office January 17, 2017 – January 15, 2019
- Preceded by: Chris Tuck
- Succeeded by: Lance Pruitt

Member of the Alaska House of Representatives from the 30th district
- In office January 19, 2009 – January 15, 2019
- Preceded by: Kevin Meyer
- Succeeded by: Josh Revak

Personal details
- Born: February 11, 1964 (age 62) Juneau, Alaska, U.S.
- Party: Republican
- Education: University of Alaska, Anchorage

Charisse Millett (born February 11, 1964) is a Republican former member of the Alaska House of Representatives, representing the 25th District from 2009 to 2019. In the 29th Legislature, from 2015 to 2016, she was the House Majority Leader. In the 30th Legislature, she served the House Minority Leader. She has also served as co-chair of the Energy Special Committee, and is a member of the Community & Regional Affairs Committee, Rules Committee, Fisheries Special Committee, and Armed Services Committee. She also serves on the Administration, Health & Social Services, and Transportation & Public Facilities Finance Subcommittees, for the 26th Legislature. Charisse Millett was a former Alaska State Legislative aide from 2005 to 2007 before being elected into office. In 2018, she was defeated in the Republican primary by Josh Revak.

== Personal life ==
Millett has three children and two grandchildren. She graduated from the Dimond High School in 1981, and attended the University of Alaska, Anchorage from 1981 to 1983.

== See also ==
- List of Native American politicians
- Native American women in politics

Alaska House of Representatives
Preceded by Chris Tuck	Minority Leader of the Alaska House of Representatives; 2017–2019	Succeeded by Lance Pruitt
