= Matt Claman =

American politician

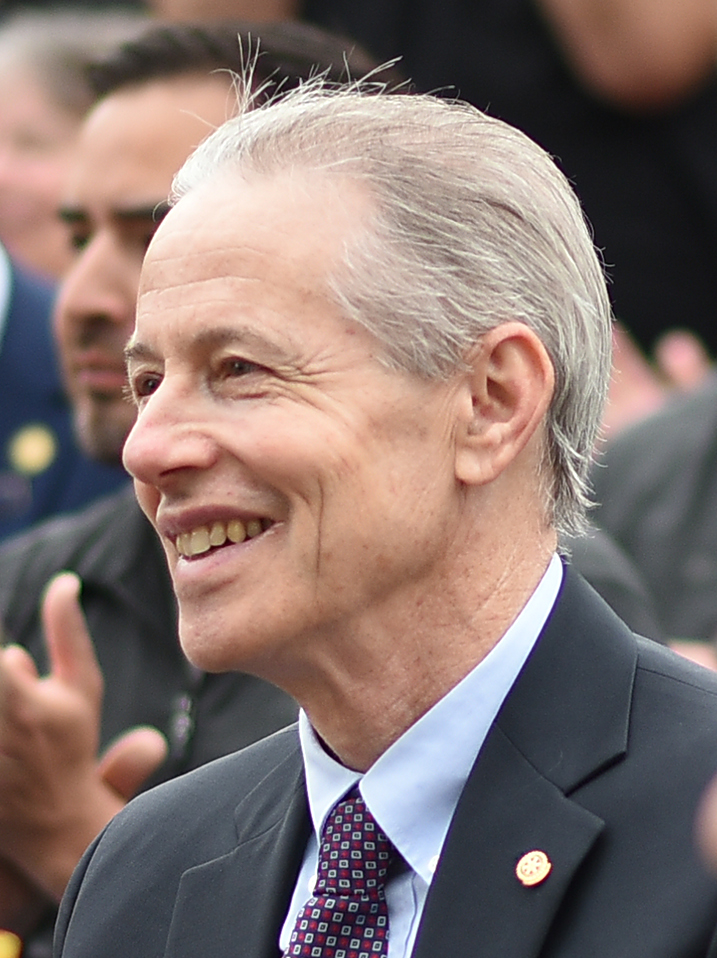
- Claman at Suzanne LaFrance's mayoral inauguration, July 2024

Member of the Alaska Senate
- Incumbent
- Assumed office January 17, 2023
- Preceded by: Mia Costello
- Constituency: H district

Member of the Alaska House of Representatives
- In office January 20, 2015 – January 2023
- Preceded by: Lindsey Holmes
- Succeeded by: Jennie Armstrong (16th district, redistricted)
- Constituency: 21st district

Mayor of Anchorage
- Acting
- In office January 3, 2009 – July 1, 2009
- Preceded by: Mark Begich
- Succeeded by: Dan Sullivan

Member of the Anchorage Assembly from Seat D
- In office April 2007 – April 2010
- Preceded by: Pamela Jennings
- Succeeded by: Ernie Hall

Personal details
- Born: 1959 (age 66–67)
- Party: Democratic
- Spouse: Lisa Rieger
- Children: 2
- Education: Colorado College (BA); University of Texas, Austin (JD)

Matthew W. Claman (born 1959) is an American politician and attorney serving as a member of the Alaska Senate since 2023, representing West Anchorage. He previously served as a member of the Alaska House of Representatives from 2015 until 2023; the acting mayor of Anchorage in 2009 (after Mark Begich resigned to be a member of the United States Senate), and a member of the Anchorage Assembly from 2007 until 2010.

== Background ==
Claman grew up in Dallas. After earning a Bachelor of Arts degree in history from Colorado College in Colorado Springs. He moved to Alaska in 1980 and worked as a prep cook at a mining camp. He went to Austin and received a Juris Doctor degree from the University of Texas School of Law. Then he began practicing law in Alaska.

== Career ==
Claman is a trial and appellate attorney with Lane Powell, a regional law firm, and is past president of the Alaska Bar Association. Claman served on the Anchorage Assembly beginning in 2007 and became its chair in 2008. He became the acting mayor of Anchorage in 2009 when then-Mayor Mark Begich was elected Alaska's United States Senator in the 2008 general election. As acting mayor during the 2008 financial crisis, he led efforts to reduce the municipal budget by $20 million, approximately 5%, and negotiated concessions to achieve a balanced budget. Claman ran for mayor in 2009 as the incumbent, but lost badly, coming in 5th place earning just 5.71% of the vote.

Claman was elected to the Alaska House of Representatives in 2014, and joined the Democratic minority. During his first term, he sat on the Judiciary Committee, the Transportation Committee, and the Energy Committee. He says he hopes to fix Alaska's financial challenges. In 2016, he was re-elected to the State House and joined a 22-member Alaska House majority coalition of 17 Democrats, three Republicans, and two independents. His peers selected him to chair the House Judiciary Committee, where he previously served as a committee member. He is the vice chair of the Rules Committee and a member of the Legislative Council, Energy Committee, Transportation Committee, and Criminal Justice Commission. He introduced legislation to hold a statewide vote amending the Constitution of Alaska to limit the legislative session to 90 days.

In response to reports about incidents of inappropriate conduct between undercover police officials and alleged sex workers revealing a legal loophole (not only in Alaska but in all states) allowing police officers to engage in sex acts with prostitution suspects prior to their arrest, Claman introduced legislation (Alaska HB 112) prohibiting such conduct. In 2022, he was elected to the Alaska Senate in a race against Republican incumbent Mia Costello.

On November 10, 2025 Claman announced his candidacy for the 2026 Alaska gubernatorial election.

On June 27th, 2026, he withdrew his candidacy from the election.

== Personal life ==
Claman and Lisa Rieger, who works for Cook Inlet Tribal Council are married. CITC is a large successful non-profit corporation. They have two children and Claman is a licensed EMT and professional wilderness guide.

== Electoral history ==
Nonpartisan primary
Party	Candidate	Votes	%
Democratic	Matt Claman (incumbent)	4,036	60.1
Republican	Thomas McKay (withdrew)	1,393	20.7
Republican	Liz Vazquez	1,287	19.2
Total votes		6,716	100.0

2024 Alaska Senate General election
Party	Candidate	Votes	%
Democratic	Matt Claman (incumbent)	9,924	55.24
Republican	Liz Vazquez	7,989	44.47
Write-in		53	0.3
Total votes		17,966	100.0
Democratic hold			
Coalition hold			

Political offices
Preceded by Mark Begich	Mayor of Anchorage; Acting; 2009	Succeeded by Dan Sullivan
