= Assembly of the City and Borough of Juneau, Alaska =

The Assembly of the City and Borough of Juneau, Alaska is the governing body and legislative branch of the City and Borough of Juneau, the local government of Juneau, Alaska, United States. As Juneau is a unified municipality, its corporate limits encompass the historic town of Juneau (or present-day downtown), suburbs both urban and rural, as well as thousands of square miles of wilderness.

The Assembly is headed by the mayor of Juneau. The assembly consists of nine members, which includes the mayor, elected in rotating tranches to three-year terms. Elections are held on the first Tuesday of every October.

== Districts ==
The City and Borough of Juneau operates under a council–manager form of government. The mayor is the titular head of the city, is the presiding officer (or chair) of the Assembly, and is one of three members of that body elected areawide (or at-large). The remaining six members are elected by district: two districts have been defined by the Assembly, as of its last redistricting in 2003:

- District 1 precincts
  - Douglas
  - Juneau No. 1
  - Juneau No. 2
  - Juneau No. 3
  - Juneau Airport
  - Lemon Creek
  - North Douglas
- District 2 precincts
  - Auke Bay
  - Lynn Canal
  - Mendenhall Valley No. 1
  - Mendenhall Valley No. 2
  - Mendenhall Valley No. 3
  - Mendenhall Valley No. 4

The 2nd Assembly District is nearly identical to the state's 31st Election District, represented in the Alaska House of Representatives by Cathy Muñoz, except that the 31st District includes the Juneau Airport precinct. The 1st Assembly District is mostly identical to the 32nd Election District represented by Sam Kito III, except for the aforementioned inclusion of Juneau Airport, in addition to the inclusion of communities outside of the CBJ: Gustavus, Kupreanof, Petersburg, Skagway and Tenakee Springs. Excepting these communities, the areawide "district" (or CBJ boundaries as a whole) are identical to Senate District P represented by Dennis Egan.

== Members ==
| Election year | Mayor | Areawide members | District 1 members | District 2 members |
|---|---|---|---|---|
| 1970 | Joseph McLean | Hunt Gruening; Robert Loescher | Greg Machyowski; George Rogers; Robert Savikko | Virginia Kline; Bill Matheny; Mike Miller |
| 1971 | Joseph McLean | Hunt Gruening; Robert Loescher | Fred Baxter^{[a]} George Rogers; Robert Savikko^{[b]} | Virginia Kline; Bill Matheny; Robert Thomas^{[c]} |
| 1972 | Joseph McLean | C. E. Jacobsen; Robert Loescher | Phil Chitwood; George Rogers^{[d]} Bill Walley | James Duncan; Virginia Kline; Bill Matheny |
| 1973 | William A. Macomber^{[e]} | C. E. Jacobsen; W. D. Overstreet | Phil Chitwood; Jeffrey Morrison; Bill Walley | James Duncan; Virginia Kline; Donald Madsen |
| 1974 | William A. Macomber^{[e]} | C. E. Jacobsen; W. D. Overstreet | Phil Chitwood; Jeffrey Morrison; Mike Thomas^{[f]} | Harry Aase; Virginia Kline; Donald Madsen |
| 1975 | Virginia Kline | David Freer; W. D. Overstreet | Phil Chitwood; Jeffrey Morrison; Mike Thomas^{[f]} | Harry Aase; Donald Madsen; Lenard Sevdy^{[g]} |
| 1976 | W. D. Overstreet | Roger Allington; David Freer | Dave Fremming; John Jensen; Jeffrey Morrison | Harry Aase; Burt Finley; James Wakefield |
| 1977 | W. D. Overstreet | Roger Allington; David Freer | John Jensen; Jeffrey Morrison; Ray Paddock, Jr. | Harry Aase; Burt Finley; James Wakefield |
| 1978 | W. D. Overstreet | Roger Allington; Ernest Polley | John Jensen; Jeffrey Morrison; Ray Paddock, Jr. | Harry Aase; James Wakefield; Charles Wells |
| 1979 | W. D. Overstreet | Fred Baxter; Ernest Polley^{[h]} | Dianne Bergstrom; Alexander Hoke; John Jensen | Harry Aase; James Wakefield; Charles Wells |
| 1980 | W. D. Overstreet | Fred Baxter; Ernest Polley^{[h]} | Dianne Bergstrom; Alexander Hoke; John Jensen | Harry Aase; James Wakefield; Charles Wells |
| 1981 | W. D. Overstreet | Fred Baxter; Ernest Polley^{[h]} | Hugh Grant; Alexander Hoke; Rich Poor | Harry Aase; Jamie Parsons; James Wakefield |
| 1982 | W. D. Overstreet | Fred Baxter; Ray Paddock, Jr. | Hugh Grant; Bill Knight; Rich Poor | Harry Aase; Kay Diebels; Jamie Parsons |
| 1983 | Fran Ulmer | Fred Baxter; Hugh Grant | Bruce Botelho; Peter Freer; Rich Poor | Kay Diebels; Ed Kalwara; Jamie Parsons |
| 1984 | Fran Ulmer | Fred Baxter; Rosalee Walker | Bruce Botelho; Peter Freer; Rich Poor | George Davidson; Kay Diebels; Jamie Parsons |
| 1985 | Ernest Polley | Fred Baxter; Rosalee Walker | Bruce Botelho; Peter Freer; Rich Poor | Errol Champion; George Davidson; Jamie Parsons |
| 1986 | Ernest Polley | Caren Robinson; Rosalee Walker | Peter Freer; Rich Poor; Clarke Young | Errol Champion; George Davidson; Jamie Parsons |
| 1987 | Ernest Polley | Caren Robinson; Rosalee Walker | McKie Campbell; Rich Poor; Clarke Young | Errol Champion; George Davidson; Jamie Parsons |
| 1988 | Bruce Botelho | Caren Robinson; Rosalee Walker | McKie Campbell; Rosie Peterson; Clarke Young | Errol Champion; George Davidson; Jamie Parsons |
| 1989 | Bruce Botelho | Caren Robinson; Rosalee Walker | McKie Campbell; Dennis Egan; Rosie Peterson | Errol Champion; George Davidson; John MacKinnon |
| 1990 | Bruce Botelho | Caren Robinson; Rosalee Walker | Dennis Egan; Kim Elton; Rosie Peterson | Errol Champion; George Davidson; John MacKinnon |
| 1991 | Jamie Parsons | Caren Robinson; Rosalee Walker | Dennis Egan; Kim Elton; Rod Swope | Errol Champion; George Davidson; John MacKinnon |
| 1992 | Jamie Parsons | Al Clough; Rosalee Walker | Dennis Egan; Kim Elton; Rod Swope | Errol Champion; George Davidson; John MacKinnon |
| 1993 | Jamie Parsons | Al Clough; Tom Garrett | Dennis Egan; Kim Elton; Rod Swope | Errol Champion; Ralph Kibby; John MacKinnon |
| 1994 | Byron Mallott^{[i]} | Al Clough; Tom Garrett | Dennis Egan^{[j]} Rosemary Hagevig; Rod Swope | Ralph Kibby; John MacKinnon; Dwight Perkins |
| 1995 | Dennis Egan | Tom Garrett; Jim Powell | Rosemary Hagevig; Cathy Muñoz; Rod Swope | Ralph Kibby; John MacKinnon; Dwight Perkins |
| 1996 | Dennis Egan | Tom Garrett; Jim Powell | Rosemary Hagevig; Cathy Muñoz; Rod Swope | Ralph Kibby; John MacKinnon; Dwight Perkins |
| 1997 | Dennis Egan | Tom Garrett; Jim Powell | Rosemary Hagevig; Ken Koelsch; Cathy Muñoz | Ralph Kibby; John MacKinnon; Dwight Perkins |
| 1998 | Dennis Egan | Tom Garrett; Jim Powell | Rosemary Hagevig; Ken Koelsch; Cathy Muñoz | Ralph Kibby; John MacKinnon; Dwight Perkins |
| 1999 | Dennis Egan | Tom Garrett; Jim Powell | Ken Koelsch; Cathy Muñoz; Frankie Pillifant | Don Etheridge; John MacKinnon; Dwight Perkins |
| 2000 | Sally Smith | Jim Powell; Marc Wheeler | Ken Koelsch; Cathy Muñoz; Frankie Pillifant | Dale Anderson; Don Etheridge; John MacKinnon |
| 2001 | Sally Smith | Jim Powell; Marc Wheeler | Jeannie Johnson; Ken Koelsch; Frankie Pillifant | Dale Anderson; Don Etheridge; Randy Wanamaker |
| 2002 | Sally Smith | Jim Powell; Marc Wheeler | Jeannie Johnson; Ken Koelsch; Merrill Sanford | Dale Anderson; Stan Ridgeway; Randy Wanamaker |
| 2003 | Bruce Botelho | Jim Powell; Marc Wheeler | Jeannie Johnson; Merrill Sanford; David G. Stone | Daniel Peterson; Stan Ridgeway; Randy Wanamaker |
| 2004 | Bruce Botelho | Johan Dybdahl; Marc Wheeler | Jeff Bush; Merrill Sanford; David G. Stone | Daniel Peterson; Stan Ridgeway; Randy Wanamaker |
| 2005 | Bruce Botelho | Bob Doll^{[m]} Johan Dybdahl | Jeff Bush; Merrill Sanford; David G. Stone | Jonathan Anderson; Daniel Peterson; Randy Wanamaker |
| 2006 | Bruce Botelho | Bob Doll^{[m]} Johan Dybdahl | Jeff Bush; Merrill Sanford; David G. Stone | Jonathan Anderson; Sara Chambers; Randy Wanamaker |
| 2007 | Bruce Botelho | Bob Doll^{[m]} Johan Dybdahl | Jeff Bush; Merrill Sanford; David G. Stone | Jonathan Anderson; Sara Chambers; Randy Wanamaker |
| 2008 | Bruce Botelho | Bob Doll^{[m]} Johan Dybdahl | Jeff Bush; Merrill Sanford; David G. Stone | Jonathan Anderson; Sara Chambers; Randy Wanamaker |
| 2009 | Bruce Botelho | Bob Doll^{[m]} Johan Dybdahl | Jeff Bush; Merrill Sanford; David G. Stone | Jonathan Anderson; Ruth Danner; Randy Wanamaker |
| 2010 | Bruce Botelho | Bob Doll^{[m]} Johan Dybdahl | Mary Becker; Merrill Sanford; David G. Stone | Jonathan Anderson^{[k]}^{[l]} Karen Crane; Ruth Danner |
| 2011 | Bruce Botelho | Johan Dybdahl; Carlton Smith | Mary Becker; Jesse Kiehl; David G. Stone | Karen Crane; Ruth Danner; Randy Wanamaker |
| 2012 | Merrill Sanford | Johan Dybdahl; Carlton Smith | Mary Becker; Loren Jones; Jesse Kiehl^{[p]} | Karen Crane; Jerry Nankervis; Randy Wanamaker |
| 2013 | Merrill Sanford | Johan Dybdahl; Carlton Smith | Mary Becker; Loren Jones; Jesse Kiehl^{[p]} | Karen Crane; Jerry Nankervis; Randy Wanamaker |
| 2014 | Merrill Sanford | Maria Gladziszewski; Kate Troll | Mary Becker; Loren Jones; Jesse Kiehl^{[p]} | Karen Crane^{[q]} Jerry Nankervis; Debbie White |
| 2015 | Greg Fisk^{[n]} / Mary Becker | Maria Gladziszewski; Kate Troll | Mary Becker; Loren Jones; Jesse Kiehl^{[p]} | Karen Crane^{[q]} Jerry Nankervis; Debbie White |
| 2016 | Ken Koelsch | Maria Gladziszewski; Kate Troll | Mary Becker; Loren Jones; Jesse Kiehl^{[p]} | Jaime Bursell; Jerry Nankervis; Debbie White |
| 2017 | Ken Koelsch | Maria Gladziszewski; Norton Gregory^{[o]} | Mary Becker; Loren Jones; Jesse Kiehl^{[p]} | Beth Weldon; Jerry Nankervis; Debbie White |
| 2018 | Ken Koelsch | Maria Gladziszewski; Norton Gregory^{[o]} | Mary Becker; Loren Jones; Jesse Kiehl^{[p]} | Beth Weldon^{[r]} Jerry Nankervis; Rob Edwardson |
| 2019 | Beth Weldon | Maria Gladziszewski; Carole Triem | Mary Becker; Loren Jones; Alicia Hughes-Skandijs | Wade Bryson; Michelle Bonnet Hale; Rob Edwardson |
| 2020 | Beth Weldon | Maria Gladziszewski; Carole Triem | Greg Smith; Loren Jones; Alicia Hughes-Skandijs | Wade Bryson; Michelle Bonnet Hale; Rob Edwardson |
| 2021 | Beth Weldon | Maria Gladziszewski; Carole Triem | Greg Smith; Loren Jones; Alicia Hughes-Skandijs | Wade Bryson; Michelle Bonnet Hale; Christine Woll |
| 2022 | Beth Weldon | Maria Gladziszewski; Carole Triem | Greg Smith; Waahlaal Giidaak Barbara Blake; Alicia Hughes-Skandijs | Wade Bryson; Michelle Bonnet Hale; Christine Woll |

=== Footnotes ===
- ^{a} Baxter resigned on April 15, 1972.
- ^{b} Savikko died on September 18, 1972.
- ^{c} Thomas resigned on June 15, 1972; James Duncan was appointed to replace him on July 6.
- ^{d} Rogers resigned on December 6, 1972; Allan Engstrom was appointed to replace him on December 12.
- ^{e} Macomber resigned on October 7, 1975.
- ^{f} Thomas resigned on August 3, 1976.
- ^{g} Sevdy resigned on December 9, 1975. Stitt was appointed to replace him on December 23.
- ^{h} Polley resigned on June 30, 1982. C. E. Jacobsen was appointed to replace him on the same day.
- ^{i} Mallott resigned. Dennis Egan was appointed to replace him on February 13, 1995.
- ^{j} Following his appointment to mayor, Cathy Muñoz was appointed to replace Egan on March 6.
- ^{k} Anderson resigned on May 23, 2011. Katherine Eldemar was appointed to replace him.
- ^{l} Eldemar resigned on June 24, 2011. Malcolm Menzies was appointed to replace her.
- ^{m} Doll resigned on June 24, 2011. Peter Freer was appointed to replace him on July 11.
- ^{n} Fisk died on November 30, 2015.
- ^{o} Gregory resigned on August 13, 2018.
- ^{p} Kiehl resigned on February 14, 2019. Alicia Hughes-Skandijs was appointed the same day to replace him.
- ^{q} Crane resigned on January 20, 2016. Jaime Bursell was appointed to replace her on February 11.
- ^{r} Weldon resigned from her district seat on July 31, 2018.

== Appointed groups ==
=== Advisory boards ===
- Americans with Disabilities Act (ADA) Committee -
- Building Code Advisory Committee
- Douglas Service Area Advisory Board
- Fisheries Development Committee
- International Relations Advisory Committee (JIRAC) -
- Juneau Commission on Aging
- Juneau Economic Development Council (JEDC) -
- Juneau Commission on Sustainability (JCOS)
- Juneau Historic Resources Advisory Committee (HRAC) -
- Juneau Human Rights Commission (JHRC) -
- Juneau International Relations Advisory Committee -
- Juneau Public Libraries Endowment Board
- Parks and Recreation Advisory Committee (PRAC) -
- Passenger Fee Proceeds Committee
- Social Services Advisory Board (SSAB)
- Wetlands Review Board (WRB)
- Utility Advisory Board
- Youth Activities Board (YAB) -

=== Appeal boards ===
- Animal Hearing Board
- Bidding Review Board
- Building Code Board of Appeals
- Personnel Board
- Sales Tax Board of Appeals

=== Enterprise and special boards ===
- Juneau International Airport Board -
- Bartlett Regional Hospital Board of Directors -
- Docks and Harbors Board -
- Eaglecrest Ski Area Board of Directors
- Planning Commission -

=== Ad hoc committees, task forces, and commissions ===
- Capital City Emergency Planning Committee
- Economic & Employment Diversification Strategy Committee
- Fluoride Study Commission
- Juneau Convention and Visitors Bureau
- Juneau Coalition for Youth -
- Performing Arts Center Commission
- West Douglas Development Working Group

=== Affiliated committees ===
- Friends of the Flag Committee
- Juneau & Douglas Fourth of July Committees
- Hank Harmon Rifle Range Inc.

== See also ==
- List of mayors of Juneau, Alaska
