= Merrill Sanford =

American politician

Mayor of Juneau, Alaska
- In office October 11, 2012 – October 20, 2015
- Preceded by: Bruce Botelho
- Succeeded by: Greg Fisk

Member of the Juneau City Assembly
- In office 2002–2010
- Preceded by: Frankie Pillifant
- Succeeded by: Jesse Kiehl

Personal details
- Born: July 17, 1947 (age 79) Bellingham, Washington
- Spouse: Patricia "Patti" Sanford (née Isaak)
- Children: 3 sons
- Education: Juneau-Douglas High School

Military service
- Branch/service: United States Marine Corps
- Years of service: 4 years

It's exciting — it's a little bit scary — to be sitting in the mayor's spot, but we'll move forward together, and hopefully as we start to debate and start to discuss issues, we'll grow as a team and we'll become a better team to serve our community, because that's what it's all about. We're not sitting here, as you all know, to glorify our own selves, but to glorify our city as the capital city, and to make us the best we can, and to help our brothers, and even sisters, in Southeast Alaska to be able to move forward also.

— Merrill Sanford on his future as mayor of Juneau

Merrill Sanford (born July 17, 1947) is an American politician who served as Mayor of Juneau, Alaska from 2012 until 2015.

== Early life ==
Merrill Sanford was born on July 17, 1947, in Bellingham, Washington. A year later, his family moved to Juneau, Alaska where he has been a resident ever since. Sanford graduated from Juneau-Douglas High School in 1966. Before getting into politics, Sanford served in the United States Marine Corps as a helicopter mechanic in the Vietnam War for four years. Sanford also worked for the Alaska National Guard for eleven years. In addition to military service, he spent two years helping to build the Trans-Alaska Pipeline System as well as thirty years as a volunteer firefighter for Capital City Fire/Rescue, from which he retired in March 2001.

== Political career ==
From 1998 to 2002, Sanford was a member of the Juneau Planning Commission, a department of the city government that develops city projects. From 2002 to 2012, Sanford served as a member of the Assembly of the City and Borough of Juneau, Alaska.

=== Mayor of Juneau ===
In 2012, Sanford ran for mayor of Juneau. The election was held on October 2, 2012. Sanford won a majority of the votes (55.26%) while Cheryl Jebe followed with 44.32%. The election had a 19.64% turnout.

Juneau mayoral election, 2012
Candidate	Votes	%
Merrill Sanford	3,334	55.26
Cheryl Jebe	2,674	44.32
write-in	25	0.41
Source: Our Campaign

Sanford ran for reelection in 2015, but he lost badly to challenger Greg Fisk. He took just 33% of the vote to 66% for Fisk.

== See also ==
- List of mayors of Juneau, Alaska
- List of people from Bellingham, Washington

Political offices
Preceded by Bruce Botelho	Mayor of Juneau; 2012–2015	Succeeded by Greg Fisk
