= Jesse Kiehl =

American politician

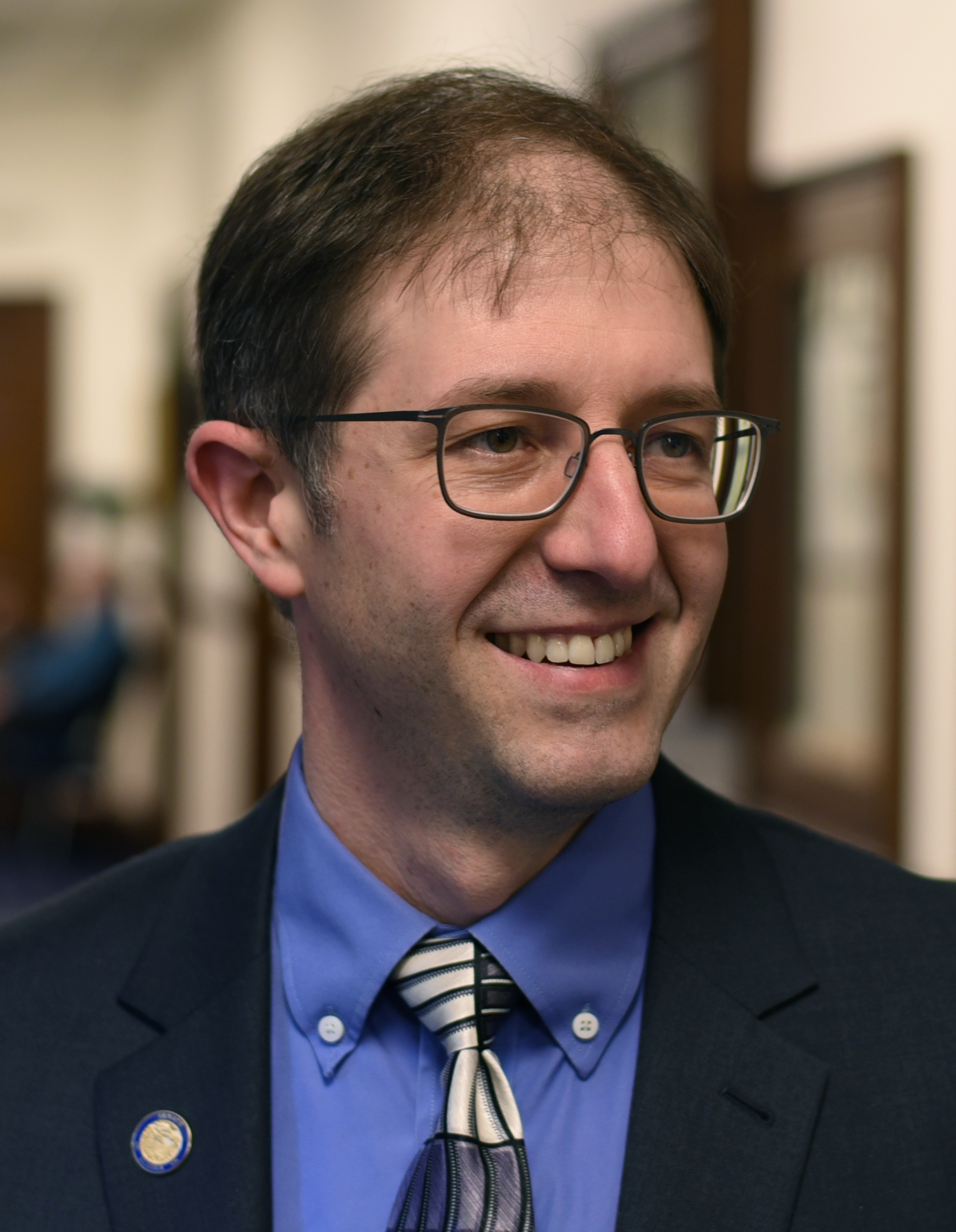
- Jesse Kiehl in a hallway of the Alaska State Capitol in May 2019

Member of the Alaska Senate
- Incumbent
- Assumed office January 15, 2019
- Preceded by: Dennis Egan
- Constituency: Q (2019-23); B (since 2023)

Assembly Member of Juneau, Alaska
- In office October 17, 2011 – January 15, 2019

Personal details
- Born: April 17, 1976 (age 50) Anchorage, Alaska, U.S.
- Party: Democratic
- Spouse: Karen Allen
- Children: 2 daughters
- Education: Whitman College; Steller Secondary School

Jesse Kiehl (born April 17, 1976) is a Democratic member of the Alaska Legislature representing the State Senate's B district and a former member of the Assembly of the City and Borough of Juneau, Alaska.

== Early life ==
Jesse Kiehl was born on April 17, 1976, in Anchorage, Alaska, and graduated from Steller Secondary School in 1994. Kiehl attended Whitman College in Walla Walla, Washington and received a Bachelor of Arts degree in 1998, with both a major in theatre and a major with honors in politics.

== Political career ==
From 2000 to 2018, Kiehl worked as staff to Juneau-area members of the Alaska State Senate. Until 2009 he worked for Kim Elton, and began working for Dennis Egan upon his appointment to replace Elton. In 2011, Kiehl ran for local office, beating Bradley Fluetsch by a large margin. He took office in October 2011. Kiehl was unopposed in his 2014 re-election campaign. In 2017 he won a third term in a three-candidate race against Chuck Collins and Loretto Jones, garnering more than 67% of the vote. He served as a member of the Assembly of the City and Borough of Juneau, Alaska until resigning to serve in the state senate in January 2019.

Kiehl also served in a Juneau-specific seat on the board of directors of the Alaska Municipal League.

Kiehl won the State Senate election on November 6, 2018, from the platform of Democratic Party. He secured sixty-two percent of the vote while his closest rival Independent Don Etheridge secured thirty-eight percent.

== Electoral history ==
2024 Nonpartisan primary
| Party | Candidate | Votes | % |
|---|---|---|---|
| Democratic | Jesse Kiehl (incumbent) | 6,256 | 100.0 |
| Total votes | | 6,256 | 100.0 |

2024 Alaska Senate general election
| Party | Candidate | Votes | % |
|---|---|---|---|
| Democratic | Jesse Kiehl (incumbent) | 15,508 | 96.51 |
| Write-in | | 561 | 3.49 |
| Total votes | | 16,069 | 100.0 |
| Democratic hold | | | |
| Coalition hold | | | |
