= Mary Becker =

American politician from Alaska

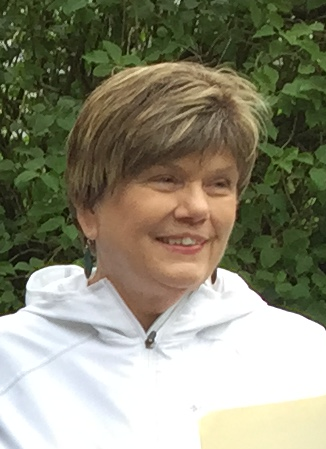

Juneau City Assembly, District 1
- In office October 5, 2010 – November 30, 2015
- Preceded by: Jeff Bush
- Succeeded by: Barbara Sheinberg
- In office March 29, 2016 – October 1, 2019
- Preceded by: Barbara Sheinberg
- Succeeded by: Greg Smith

Mayor of Juneau
- In office November 30, 2015 – March 29, 2016
- Preceded by: Greg Fisk
- Succeeded by: Ken Koelsch

Personal details
- Party: Democratic
- Spouse: Jim
- Children: 3
- Education: College of Idaho
- Profession: School teacher

Mary Becker is a former member of the City Assembly of Juneau, Alaska. She has also been Juneau's mayor and a member of Juneau's school board.

== Early years ==
Mary Becker earned a bachelor's degree from the College of Idaho. She moved to Juneau around 1966.

== Career ==
Becker worked as a school teacher from 1967 to 1997.

Becker ran for one of two open seats on the Juneau School Board in 1998. Board members Incumbents Sally Rue and Tom Wagner had decided not to run for reelection. Robert Starbard, Edith McHenry, Jan Marie Ferrell, and Stan Ridgeway were also candidates. Becker said that Juneau needed a new high school, and she advocated for reducing class sizes. She was in favor of a ballot measure to approve sale of $55.5 million in bonds in order to build a high school at Dimond Park for 1,500 students. Becker supported high-school proficiency tests as a way to the academic progress of students. The editorial board of the Juneau Empire endorsed her candidacy. Becker and Ridgeway won the election for three-year terms on the Juneau School Board.

During Becker's first term in office, she voted against adding a program to teach life skills to students with disabilities, a program to teach infant care to teenage parents, and a program to help emotionally disturbed students in a new high school being built in Dimond Park. Becker said that having those programs in just one school was sufficient.

Becker voted in favor of a new school policy making it optional for students to stand for the Pledge of Allegiance. Becker said that being seated for the Pledge of Allegiance is not respectful, although a policy requiring standing is not worth fighting in court.

In 2001, Becker voted in favor of a teacher's contract that gave current teachers a 4.5 percent raise.

Becker ran for reelection in 2001. Beck said she wanted to stay on the school board in order to be involved in the remodeling of Juneau-Douglas High School, the building of a new high school, and attaining academic standards. Becker won the election.

In January 2002, a teenager held a banner reading "Bong Hits 4 Jesus" across the street from the 2002 Winter Olympics torch relay. The teenager was a student of Juneau-Douglas High School and was across the street from the school while holding the banner. The high school suspended the student for ten days because of the banner. The teenager wanted the suspension expunged from his record, but Becker and the rest of the school board voted to uphold the suspension. The teenager filed a civil-rights lawsuit against the school principal and the school board, claiming his federal and state constitutional rights to free speech had been violated. The case, Morse v. Frederick, ended up going to the United States Supreme Court, and the Court held, 5–4, that the First Amendment does not prevent educators from suppressing, at or across the street from a school-supervised event, student speech that is reasonably viewed as promoting illegal drug use.

In 2002, Becker voted against a proposal to buy $25,000 of new equipment for Juneau-Douglas High School's auto mechanics program and to provide $10,000 to the Juneau Community Charter School to help it cover its budget shortfall.

In 2003, Becker voted for a new teachers' contract, giving a two-percent raise to teachers and eliminating 40 teachers' positions during the following two years.

After Juneau residents voted against building a new high school for 1,080 students in Dimond Park in a special election, Becker supported building a school with an 840-student capacity instead. A majority of voters approved the alternative proposal in a subsequent election.

Becker supported a new dress code for students, saying it would improve race relations and improve parental involvement in education.

Becker ran for reelection to the school board in 2004. Becker said she was running for reelection because she wanted to be involved in the building of a second high school in Juneau. She was one of three candidates for two available seats on the school board. The editorial board of the Juneau Empire endorsed the other candidates in the race. Becker won reelection to another term in office.

== Electoral results ==
=== 1998 ===
1998 Juneau School Board election
| Party | Candidate | Votes | % |
|---|---|---|---|
| Nonpartisan | Mary Becker | 4,546 | 33 |
| Nonpartisan | Stan Ridgeway | 3,283 | 29 |
| Nonpartisan | Jan Marie Ferrell | 2,655 | 19 |
| Nonpartisan | Edith McHenry | 1,798 | 13 |
| Nonpartisan | Robert Starbard | 1,691 | 12 |

=== 2001 ===
2001 Juneau School Board election
| Party | Candidate | Votes | % |
|---|---|---|---|
| Nonpartisan | Mary Becker | 3,799 | 50 |
| Nonpartisan | Stan Ridgeway | 3,591 | 47 |
| Nonpartisan | Write-in | 221 | 3 |

=== 2004 ===
2004 Juneau School Board election
| Party | Candidate | Votes | % |
|---|---|---|---|
| Nonpartisan | Mary Becker | 4,513 | 42 |
| Nonpartisan | Bill Peters | 3,594 | 33 |
| Nonpartisan | LeVonne Garvey | 2,763 | 25 |

=== 2010 ===
2010 City Assembly, District 1 election
| Party | Candidate | Votes | % |
|---|---|---|---|
| Nonpartisan | Mary Becker | 5,071 | 96 |
| Nonpartisan | Write-in | 196 | 4 |

=== 2013 ===
2013 City Assembly, District 1 election
| Party | Candidate | Votes | % |
|---|---|---|---|
| Nonpartisan | Mary Becker | | 100 |

=== 2016 ===
2016 City Assembly, District 1 election
| Party | Candidate | Votes | % |
|---|---|---|---|
| Nonpartisan | Mary Becker | 4,060 | 52 |
| Nonpartisan | Arnold Liebelt | 3,472 | 44 |
| Nonpartisan | William Quayle Jr. | 292 | 4 |
