= Bruce Botelho =

American attorney & politician (born 1948)

Bruce M. Botelho
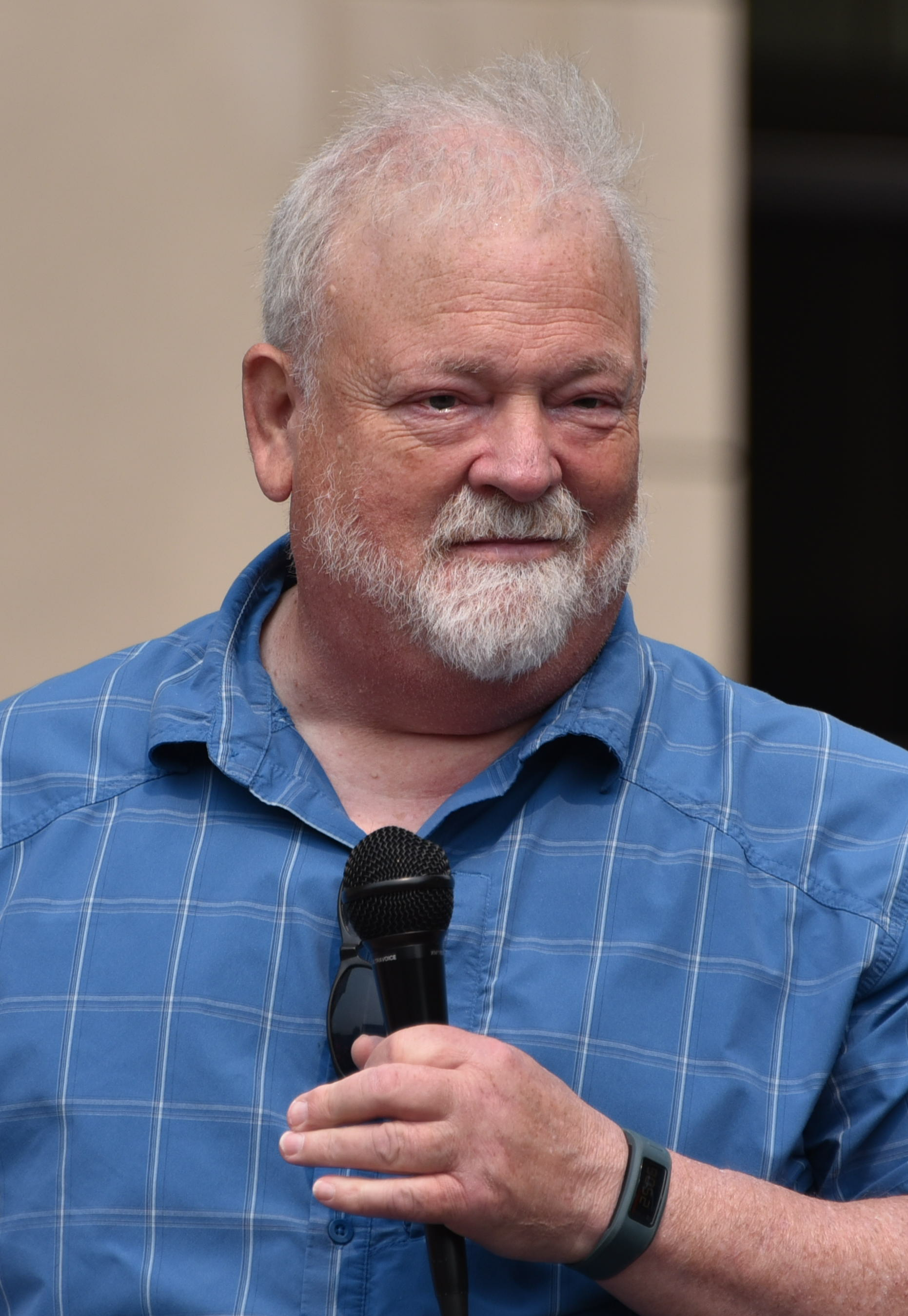
- Bruce Botelho speaking in front of the Alaska State Capitol in July 2019

Mayor of Juneau, Alaska
- In office October 27, 2003 – October 11, 2012
- Preceded by: Sally Smith
- Succeeded by: Merrill Sanford
- In office October 1988 – October 1991
- Preceded by: Ernest E. Polley
- Succeeded by: Jamie Parsons

Alaska Attorney General
- In office January 12, 1994 – December 2002
- Governor: Wally Hickel; Tony Knowles
- Preceded by: Charles E. Cole
- Succeeded by: Gregg D. Renkes

Personal details
- Born: October 6, 1948 (age 77) Juneau, Alaska, U.S.
- Party: Democratic
- Spouse: Maria De Guadalupe Alvarez
- Children: 2
- Education: Juneau-Douglas High School; Willamette University (BA); Willamette University College of Law (JD)
- Profession: lawyer

Bruce M. Botelho (born October 6, 1948) is an American attorney and politician in the U.S. state of Alaska. He served as the mayor of Juneau from 1988 to 1991 and from 2003 to 2012. Born and raised in Juneau, where his father was a top official of the Alaska Highway Patrol, Botelho has pursued concurrent careers in law and politics, largely with success. He also previously served a term as mayor from 1988 to 1991, defeating former Alaska Secretary of State Robert W. Ward in the election. He spent most of his professional career as an employee of the Alaska Department of Law. He rose to the top position in the department in 1994, when Governor Walter Hickel appointed him to be the Alaska Attorney General. Retained by Hickel's successor, Tony Knowles, Botelho served as Attorney General for nearly nine years before retiring from state service.

== Early life and education ==
Bruce M. Botelho was born in Juneau, Alaska, on October 6, 1948. He was raised in that city and in Anchorage, graduating from Juneau-Douglas High School in 1966, after which he attended school in Germany as an exchange student. He graduated from Willamette University in Salem, Oregon, with a Bachelor of Arts in German Literature in 1971. Botelho then went to law school and graduated from Willamette's School of Law with a Juris Doctor in 1976. He also earned a ZP (Germanistik), at Ruprecht Karl Universität in Heidelberg, Germany.

== Early career ==
During law school, Botelho clerked for the office of Oregon Legislative Counsel, the Oregon Law Improvement Commission and Alaska Supreme Court Justice Edmond W. Burke. Immediately following law school, in 1976 Botelho was appointed an assistant attorney general in the Alaska Department of Law, where he represented the departments of commerce and economic development and revenue. In 1978 he was promoted to section supervising attorney for the human services section which provided legal services to the departments of health and social services, labor and education. He served as counsel to the state board of education. In 1983 he was appointed deputy commissioner of the Alaska Department of Revenue, a position he held until May 1986. There he oversaw the state's tax programs, child support enforcement, permanent fund dividends, charitable gaming, and alcohol beverage control.

== Politics ==
=== Juneau Assembly and first mayoral term ===
Botelho began his political career in 1983 when he was elected to the City and Borough of Juneau Assembly. He was elected as mayor of Juneau in October 1988, defeating former Lieutenant Governor Robert W. Ward, serving until October 1991.

=== Alaska Attorney General ===
Botelho had returned to the Alaska Department of Law in mid-1987 as supervising attorney of the oil and gas section. In February 1992 he was appointed as deputy attorney general for Alaska. On January 12, 1994 he was appointed by Governor Walter J. Hickel as Attorney General and confirmed by the Alaska Legislature that May. In December 1994, Governor Hickel was succeeded by Tony Knowles, who asked Botelho to continue in office. He served until December 2002. As Attorney General, Botelho chaired the Criminal Justice Council and served as a trustee to the Alaska Permanent Fund Corporation. He also chaired the Children's Confidentiality Task Force, the state team on state-tribal relations, the Governors Conference on Youth and Justice, and co-chaired the Criminal Justice Assessment Commission. He served as chief of staff for the Governor's Task Force on Civil Justice Reform and the Governor's Subsistence Task Force. He was an initial trustee of the Alaska Children's Trust. Major accomplishments of his tenure included oil and gas tax and royalty settlements in excess of $3 billion, settlement of the Alaska mental health lands trust litigation, lifting of the blockade of the Alaska state ferry Malaspina, Alaska's participation in the national tobacco litigation, natural resource and environmental protection actions against Tyson Seafood Group and Royal Caribbean Cruise Lines, and reinvigorated antitrust enforcement including propane litigation and the Carrs-Safeway grocery and BP Amoco-Arco mergers.

=== Return to Juneau mayoralty (2003–2012) ===
In October 2003, he was elected to his second term as mayor of Juneau. Botelho was re-elected in October 2006 and again in October 2009. Botelho left office in 2012 after being term-limited. He was succeeded by Merrill Sanford. With 12 years served as mayor, Botelho is the longest-serving mayor in Juneau's history.

=== Alaska Coastal Zone Management Initiative ===
In 1978, under the leadership of Governor Jay Hammond, Alaska established its coastal zone management program to undertake land-use planning, permitting to regulate development and habitat restoration in coastal regions. Alaska’s program obtained federal recognition and funding, but was substantially weakened in the mid-2000’s and ultimately abolished in 2011. Botelho organized and led a citizen’s initiative to restore the program, collecting the requisite signatures in record time. However, opposition to the initiative from the resource extraction industry led to a decisive defeat for the initiative in the August 2012 primary election. Today, with the exception of Alaska, all 35 coastal and Great Lakes states and territories participate in the National Coastal Zone Management Program.

=== Walker transition team ===
Botelho was tapped to serve on Bill Walker's gubernatorial transition team in 2014. He served as temporary coordinator for the transition effort, serving into the first weeks of Walker's administration as the new governor appointed, removed, and retained a number of state government appointees.

Walker's running mate, Democrat Byron Mallott, is also a former mayor of Juneau.

=== Alaskans for Better Elections ===
Botelho was one of the three prime sponsors of a statewide initiative known as "Ballot Measure 2" appearing on the 2020 Alaska general election ballot. The proposition called for the implementation of open primaries, ranked choice voting and campaign finance reform. It narrowly passed, 174,032 to 170,251. Botelho, along with others, formed "Alaskans for Better Elections" to campaign for the ballot measure, and, subsequently, to promote its implementation and other election reforms. The new voting system was put to an unexpected early trial when Congressman Don Young died in March 2022 and a special primary and general election to replace him was held. Alaskans for Better Elections undertook a major educational campaign to educate the public on how the open primary and ranked choice voting would occur and continued that effort through the regular August 2022 primary and the November 2022 general election. Kelly Tshibaka and Sarah Palin, candidates who lost their respective races for U.S. Senate and U.S. House of Representatives have undertaken efforts to repeal ranked choice voting in Alaska and elsewhere.

=== Defend Our Constitution ===
Under Alaska’s constitution, Alaska voters must be asked every ten years whether a constitutional convention should be called. In late 2021, Botelho organized "Defend Our Constitution", a grass roots campaign to oppose the convention. The campaign was overseen by a bipartisan and geographically diverse executive committee of eight. Opposition coalesced around proponents’ arguments to change the judiciary, embed Alaska’s Permanent Fund dividend in the constitution, and curtail abortion rights, among others. The ballot measure was defeated in the November 2022 general election by a vote of 180,529 to 75,723.

== Other memberships and awards ==
Botelho currently chairs the Partnership, a non-profit dedicated to the construction of a new arts and culture center in Juneau. In addition, he recently completed service on the governance board of the Foraker Group and on the board of the Alaska Humanities Forum. Botelho was chair of the Tongass Futures Roundtable, served on the Alaska Rural Justice and Law Enforcement Commission, was a director of the Alaska Municipal League and president of the Alaska Conference of Mayors. He is a former trustee of the Alaska Permanent Fund Corporation, an original trustee of the Alaska Children's Trust, and former chair of the Conference of Western Attorneys General. He has been an active participant in Scouting, having served as president of the Southeast Alaska Area Council, Boy Scouts of America and in numerous other volunteer Scouting capacities. He is the recipient of the Alaska State Bar Association’s 2005 Pro Bono Award, its 2007 Jay Rabinowitz Public Service Award, and the Alaska Municipal League’s 2011 Vic Fischer Local Government Leadership Award. He was awarded an honorary doctorate of laws from the University of Alaska Southeast in May 2018.

== Personal ==
Botelho married the former Maria De Guadalupe Alvarez, known as Lupita, and they have two children, Alex and Adriana. Bruce is an accomplished international folk dancer.

Political offices
Preceded by Charles E. Cole	Alaska Attorney General; 1994–2002	Succeeded by Gregg Renkes
