= Dennis Egan =

American politician (1947–2022)

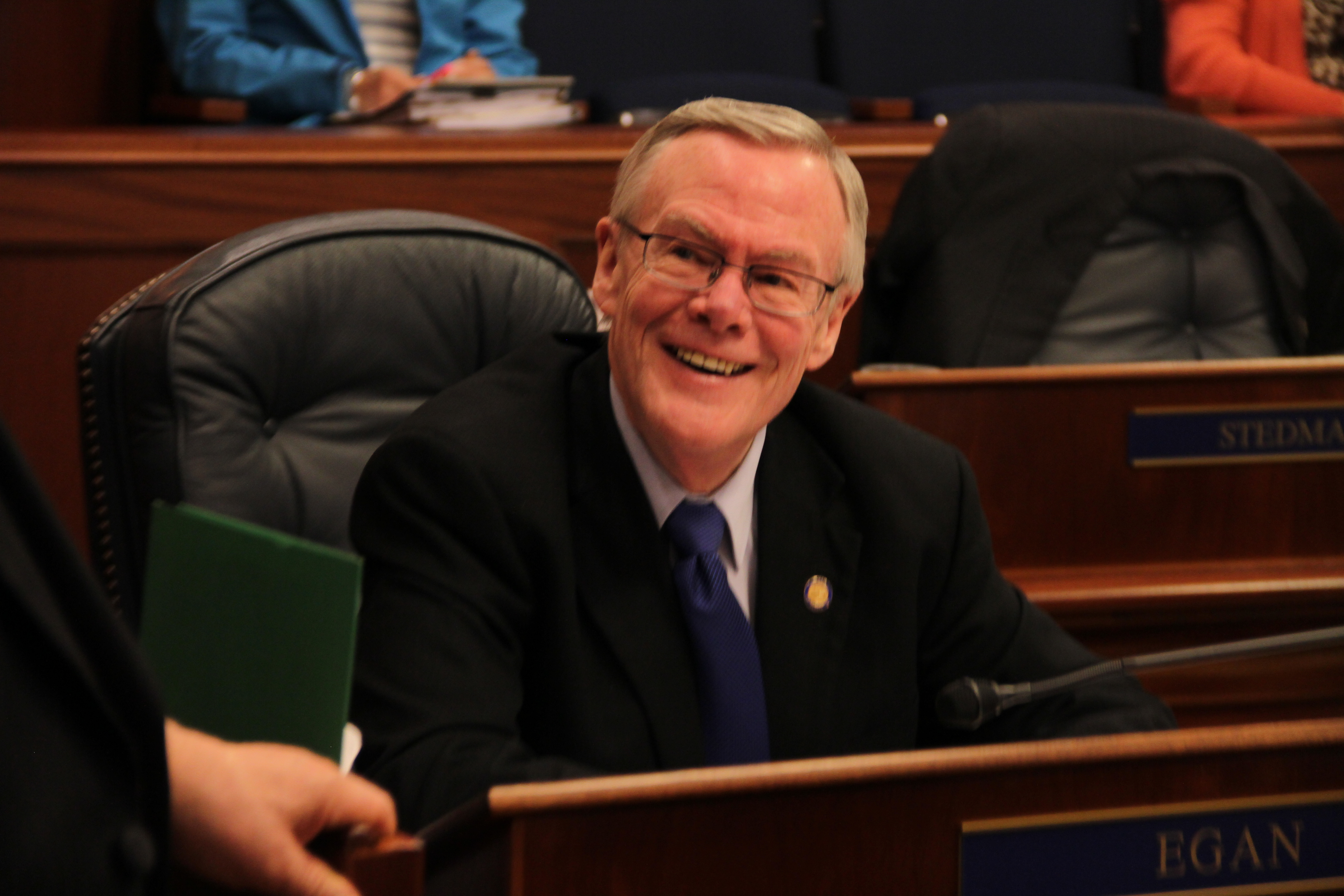
- Egan in 2013

Member of the Alaska Senate from the Q district B district (2009–2013) P district (2013–2015)
- In office April 19, 2009 – January 15, 2019
- Preceded by: Kim Elton
- Succeeded by: Jesse Kiehl

Mayor of Juneau, Alaska
- In office February 13, 1995 – October 3, 2000
- Preceded by: Byron Mallott
- Succeeded by: Sally Smith

Personal details
- Born: Dennis William Egan; March 3, 1947 Juneau, Territory of Alaska, U.S.
- Died: June 28, 2022 (aged 75) Salem, Oregon, U.S.
- Party: Democratic
- Spouse: Linda Egan (m. 1969)
- Children: 2
- Occupation: Radio broadcaster

Military service
- Allegiance: United States
- Branch/service: Army National Guard
- Years of service: 1967–1974
- Unit: 910th Engineer Company

Dennis William Egan (March 3, 1947 – June 28, 2022) was an American politician who was a member of the Alaska Senate representing Juneau from April 19, 2009, until January 15, 2019. A member of the Democratic Party, he previously served as the mayor of Juneau from February 13, 1995, to October 3, 2000, and was a member of the local assembly prior to that. Outside of politics, he was known for his work as a radio broadcaster, most notably for KINY, and was inducted to the Alaskan Broadcaster Association's Hall of Fame in 2001.

== Early life ==
Egan was born in Juneau, Territory of Alaska, on March 3, 1947. He was the son of Bill Egan, a politician active in Alaska Territory who would go on to service as the state's first and fourth governor, and Neva Egan (née Desdia Neva McKittrick), who served as First Lady of Alaska during her husband's time as governor. He lived in Washington, D.C. while his father lobbied for full Alaskan statehood. At the age of eleven he appeared on I've Got a Secret when Alaska entered the Union in 1959.

During high school and after broadcast engineer training, he worked at KINY in the 1960s. In 1967, Egan graduated from radio operation engineering school. He then served in the Alaska Army National Guard 910th Engineer Company from 1967 to 1974. He worked on the construction of the Trans-Alaska Pipeline System as an employee of Caterpillar Inc. He later worked in various positions for the State of Alaska government. In 1980, he began to host Problem Corner, a Juneau-area call-in show on KINY. He would continue to host the show until January 2010. He also was the manager of Alaska-Juneau Communications, Inc., which owns the Juneau-area radio stations KINY and KSUP. During his time in radio, he was the Alaska Broadcaster Association's Broadcaster of the Year in 1990, and selected for the association's Hall of Fame in 2001.

== Local politics ==
Dennis's first attempt at politics happened in the 1980s, when he ran a primary election bid for a seat in the Alaska House of Representatives; he lost to Bruce Botelho.

On the suggestion of friends, Egan ran for the Assembly of the City and Borough of Juneau in 1989. He won and served nearly two full three-year terms in the Assembly from October 3, 1989, to February 13, 1995.

Egan was deputy mayor of Juneau in 1995. He was appointed mayor when Byron Mallott resigned in order to become executive director of the Alaska Permanent Fund Corporation; Mallott had believed he could do both jobs, but his plans drew criticism anyway, and he resigned as mayor. Dennis Egan won reelection in 1995 and 1997. The 1997 race was a landslide victory for Egan. His opponent, Cory Mann, was a "newcomer to politics", according to the Juneau Empire, and had not filed for election until October 2, five days before the filing deadline to run for office.

An effective mayor, Egan helped mediation efforts to end an August 1997 Alaska Native Brotherhood boycott of the 51st Golden North Salmon Derby (1997 Golden North Salmon Derby Boycott). Bob Tkacz of the Anchorage Press had an unfavorable view of the Empire's support of the Derby and Egan's efforts to end the boycott. In September 1997 Egan helped keep 200 United States Forest Service jobs from being moved from Juneau to Ketchikan.

Egan declined to run for re-election in 2000. He was succeeded by Sally Smith who defeated former mayor Jamie Parsons by 220 votes.

== Alaska Senate ==
In April 2009, Kim Elton resigned his seat in the Alaska Senate to accept presidential appointment as Director of Alaska Affairs at the U.S. Department of the Interior. Governor Sarah Palin chose to appoint Tim Grussendorf, Chief of Staff to Senator Lyman Hoffman, to the seat over State Representative Beth Kerttula who was the preferred choice of local Democratic Party.

In April 2009, Egan was appointed to the Alaska Senate by Governor Sarah Palin to replace Kim Elton, who resigned in March 2009. Subsequently, the Democratic caucus in the Senate refused to confirm Grussendorf and subsequently two other Palin nominees. Egan was ultimately appointed as a compromise candidate and confirmed by the Senate Democrats with support from Beth Kerttula, Cathy Muñoz, Bruce Botelho, and the Juneau Democrats.

In the 2010 election, Egan ran against token write-in opposition, winning a full term with 96% of the vote. In the 2014 general election, he defeated Republican Tom Williams, winning 72% of the vote.

=== Caucuses ===
Egan joined the Republican-led Senate majority in the 28th Senate, from 2013 to 2014, earning the chairmanship of the Transportation Committee. He continued to vote with Democrats on several major bills, including Governor Sean Parnell's oil tax initiative in 2013, and was not invited to an organizational meeting for the majority caucus after the 2014 election. In the 29th Senate, which began in 2015, he was a member of the Democratic minority caucus.

== Personal life and death ==
Egan was married to Linda and together they had two daughters. He died at an assisted living facility in Salem, Oregon, on June 28, 2022, at the age of 75.

== Electoral history ==
Juneau, Alaska, regular election, 1989 (District 1)
Candidate	Votes	Percentage
Dennis Egan	3990	57.0%
Joe Geldhof	2095	29.9%
Lee Stoops	868	12.4%
Write-in	47	0.7%
Juneau, Alaska, regular election, 1992 (District 1)
Dennis Egan	5193	62.7%
Sandy Harbanuk	3063	37.0%
Write-in	22	0.3%

Juneau, Alaska, regular election, 1995 (Mayor)
Candidate	Votes	Percentage
Dennis Egan	5620	57.53%
Chuck Keen	2123	21.73%
Mark Farmer	1847	18.91%
Write-in	179	1.83%
Juneau, Alaska, regular election, 1997 (Mayor)
Dennis Egan	5432	78.1%
Cory Mann	1392	20.0%
Write-in	129	1.9%
