= Kim Elton =

American politician

Kim S. Elton

Member of the Alaska Senate from the B district
- In office January 19, 1999 – March 2, 2009
- Preceded by: Jim Duncan
- Succeeded by: Dennis Egan

Member of the Alaska House of Representatives from the 3rd district
- In office January 16, 1995 – January 18, 1999
- Preceded by: Fran Ulmer
- Succeeded by: Beth Kerttula

Member of the Juneau Assembly from District 1
- In office October 1990 – October 1994
- Preceded by: McKie Campbell
- Succeeded by: Rosemary Hagevig

Personal details
- Born: April 9, 1948 (age 78) Havre, Montana
- Party: Democratic
- Spouse: Marylou
- Education: Saint Olaf College, University of Alaska Fairbanks
- Profession: Journalist

Kim Steven Elton (born April 9, 1948) is a journalist, commercial fisherman, government official and Democratic politician in the U.S. state of Alaska. Elton represented Juneau in the Alaska House of Representatives for two terms, from 1995 to 1999. In 1998, he was elected to the Alaska Senate, serving until his resignation in early 2009 to accept appointment as director of Alaska Affairs at the U.S. Department of the Interior by President Barack Obama. Prior to holding elected office, Elton was executive director of the Alaska Seafood Marketing Institute and a salmon troller engaged in commercial fishing.

== Early life ==
Kim Steven Elton was born in Havre, Montana on April 9, 1948. He moved to Alaska with his family in 1961 and graduated from Juneau-Douglas High School in 1966. He attended St. Olaf College from 1966 to 1968. After serving in the United States Army from 1969 to 1971 in the Vietnam War and receiving an honorable discharge, Elton returned to college at the University of Alaska Fairbanks from 1972 to 1974.

== Professional life ==
Elton began his career as a journalist. He was the editor of the Juneau Empire from 1976 to 1978. He also worked for the Fairbanks Daily News-Miner and was engaged in commercial fishing. Elton served in a number of staff positions in state government: he was a staff assistant to the Legislative Ethics Committee, an assistant state ombudsman, director of policy for Lieutenant Governor Terry Miller, and as executive director of the Alaska Seafood Marketing Institute.

== Political career ==
Elton entered electoral politics when he ran for and won a seat on the Assembly of the City and Borough of Juneau, Alaska in 1990. He championed a charter amendment approved by voters in 1991 establishing term limits for Assembly members. He left the Assembly in 1994 to run for an open seat in the Alaska House of Representatives, which incumbent Fran Ulmer had given up to successfully run for lieutenant governor.

From 1995 to 1999, Elton represented the 3rd District, which encompasses the portion of Juneau on the mainland from Thane to Juneau International Airport, in addition to Douglas Island. During his second term in the House, Elton moved from downtown Juneau to Point Louisa, at mile 15 of the Glacier Highway, located in the Mendenhall Valley-centered 4th District represented by Republican Bill Hudson. Due to a long-standing quirk of Alaska law, Elton was able to complete his term without having to resign, but was unable to run for reelection to his seat. Elton contemplated running for the Assembly again until Jim Duncan, who served six terms in the House followed by three terms in the Senate, retired from the Legislature to challenge Alaska's at-large member of the U.S. House, Don Young. Elton instead filed to replace Duncan in the Senate.

In 1998, he was elected to the Senate, defeating Don Abel Jr., the owner of a Juneau hardware business established by his father, who served for fourteen years as a regent of the University of Alaska. In 2002, Elton won reelection against Cathy Muñoz. Muñoz, whose family came to Juneau from Wrangell in 1928, became the fourth generation in her family to hold elected office in Southeast Alaska when she was appointed to replace Dennis Egan (who was appointed Juneau's mayor) on the Juneau Assembly in 1995. Muñoz would herself later move from downtown Juneau to out on the Glacier Highway, and was elected to the House from the 4th District in 2008. In 2006, Elton again won reelection against Herman "Mac" Meiners Jr. by an approximately two-to-one margin, similar to what he had won his two House elections by.

=== Electoral history ===
1994 Alaska House of Representatives election (District 3)
| Party | Candidate | Votes | % | ±% |
|---|---|---|---|---|
| Democratic | Kim Elton | 5,186 | 65.4 | |
| Republican | Jack Cadigan | 2,711 | 34.2 | |

1996 Alaska House of Representatives election (District 3)
| Party | Candidate | Votes | % | ±% |
|---|---|---|---|---|
| Democratic | Kim Elton | 4,732 | 64.0 | |
| Republican | Ann House | 2,634 | 35.7 | |

1998 Alaska Senate election (District B)
| Party | Candidate | Votes | % | ±% |
|---|---|---|---|---|
| Democratic | Kim Elton | 7,710 | 54.70 | |
| Republican | Don Abel | 6,341 | 44.99 | |

2002 Alaska Senate election (District B)
| Party | Candidate | Votes | % | ±% |
|---|---|---|---|---|
| Democratic | Kim Elton | 7,987 | 51.26 | |
| Republican | Cathy Muñoz | 7,570 | 48.58 | |

2006 Alaska Senate election (District B)
| Party | Candidate | Votes | % | ±% |
|---|---|---|---|---|
| Democratic | Kim Elton | 8,679 | 64.51 | |
| Republican | Herman Meiners | 4,742 | 35.25 | |
