= Herman Tripp =

American politician (1859–1939)

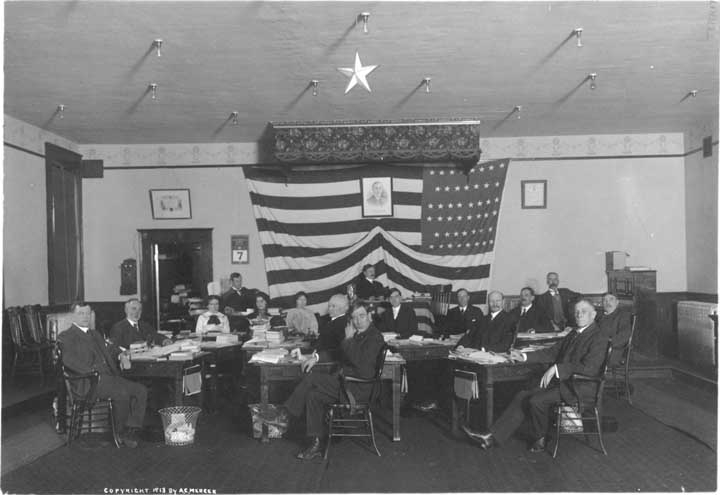
First Alaska Territorial Senate, 1913; Tripp is second from left.

Herman Tilden Tripp (August 6, 1859 – July 5, 1939) was an Alaskan politician, including mayor of Juneau, Alaska from 1906 to 1907. He was also a Republican member of the First Alaska Territorial Senate from 1913 to 1914, and a member of the Fifth Alaska Territorial House of Representatives, from 1921 to 1922. For both terms, he represented Juneau.
