= Greg Fisk =

American politician

Mayor of Juneau
- In office October 20, 2015 – November 30, 2015
- Preceded by: Merrill Sanford
- Succeeded by: Mary Becker

Personal details
- Born: September 26, 1945
- Died: November 30, 2015 (aged 70) Juneau, Alaska, U.S.
- Children: Ian
- Education: Indiana University, Bloomington

Stephen Gregory Fisk (September 26, 1945 – November 30, 2015) was the 13th mayor of the unified City and Borough of Juneau, Alaska, the state capital of Alaska, United States. Prior to his election, Fisk had worked as a fisheries consultant. He died at home just over a month into his term of office after being elected over incumbent Merrill Sanford by a wide margin.

== Education ==
Greg Fisk graduated from West Anchorage High School in Anchorage, Alaska, in 1963. Fisk went on to attend Indiana University, where he received a B.A. in Geography in 1971.

== Business career ==
Fisk was the founder and owner of SeaFisk Consulting & Management, LLC., a Juneau-based company which provides consulting services for fisheries, and the Alaskan seafood industry.

SeaFisk has not been limited to consultations involving seafood. In 2012, SeaFisk collaborated with the Juneau Economic Development Council over a proposed downtown public shuttle, known as the Circulator.

When Greg Fisk's son, Ian, graduated from the University of Oregon, they traveled to Ensenada, Mexico and bought a fishing vessel from the Mexican government. They sailed the vessel to Seattle, where they refurbished it. Both Fisks remained involved in the fishing industry.

== Political career ==
Prior to 2015, Fisk had never run for elected office, and was largely unknown in the politics of Alaska. However, Fisk was involved for many years in issues related to fishing, a large industry in Alaska. Fisk served as chairman of a City and Borough of Juneau task force that sought to bring 175 National Oceanic and Atmospheric Administration jobs to Juneau from Seattle.

=== Elected mayor ===
In 2015, Greg Fisk filed paperwork to run for mayor of Juneau on the last day available to file, challenging Merrill Sanford, a first-term mayor who had been running unopposed for re-election. Fisk was widely seen as having run an aggressive campaign, while Sanford's campaign was notably lower in profile. On October 6, 2015, Fisk was elected mayor of Juneau, winning a substantial majority of votes. Unofficial vote totals gave Fisk a 2-1 vote margin over Sanford.

Fisk, a resident of the Starr Hill neighborhood, was the first mayor of Juneau in more than 20 years (since Jamie Parsons, who left office in 1994) not to live on Douglas Island.

Juneau mayoral election, 2015
Candidate	Votes	%
(I) Merrill Sanford	1,910	32.8%
* Greg Fisk	3,830	65.9%
Write-in	24	<1%
Disqualified/other	51	<1%
Source: City and Borough of Juneau Clerk's Office; Key: I = Incumbent * = Winner (5,815 ballots returned)

== Political positions ==
During the 2015 Juneau mayoral race, Fisk stated that he supported raising the minimum wage. Fisk voted to legalize recreational use of marijuana in Alaska. Fisk also supported enacting a ban on discrimination against the LGBT community in housing and other public accommodation, and stated that he believes human activity is contributing to global warming.

== Death ==
Fisk was found dead by his son, Ian, at his home on Kennedy Street on November 30, 2015. The following day, his body was sent to Anchorage for an autopsy, and a preliminary autopsy found that his injuries were consistent with those resulting from a fall and that Fisk died from natural causes.

Political offices
Preceded by Merrill Sanford	Mayor of Juneau; 2015	Succeeded by Mary Becker
