= Valerie Davidson =

American politician

- Nurr'araaluk Amillamarnan
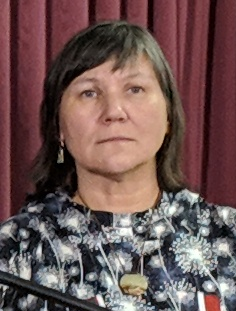
- Davidson in 2018

President of Alaska Native Tribal Health Consortium
- In office March 9, 2021 – May 7, 2024
- Preceded by: Andy Teuber
- Succeeded by: Natasha Singh

President of Alaska Pacific University
- In office April 25, 2020 – March 9, 2021
- Preceded by: Bob Onders
- Succeeded by: Bob Onders (interim)

13th Lieutenant Governor of Alaska
- In office October 16, 2018 – December 3, 2018
- Governor: Bill Walker
- Preceded by: Byron Mallott
- Succeeded by: Kevin Meyer

Commissioner of the Alaska Department of Health and Social Services
- In office December 1, 2014 – October 16, 2018
- Governor: Bill Walker
- Preceded by: William Streur
- Succeeded by: Jay Butler

Personal details
- Born: May 19, 1967 (age 59) Bethel, Alaska, U.S.
- Party: Democratic
- Education: University of Alaska Southeast (BA); University of New Mexico (JD)

Valerie Nurr'araaluk Davidson (Note: Nurr'araaluk is part of Davidson's Yup'ik name. Her full Yup'ik name is Nurr'araaluk Amillamarnan. Nurr'araaluk is also shortened to Nurrii.) (born May 19, 1967) is an American politician who briefly served as the 13th lieutenant governor of Alaska, from October to December 2018. She was sworn in after Byron Mallott's abrupt resignation from the post on October 16, 2018. In April 2020, Davidson became the 12th president of Alaska Pacific University, the first woman to serve as the university's president. She took a leave of absence from Alaska Pacific University to become interim president of the Alaska Native Tribal Health Consortium in March 2021. Her presidency of the Consortium became permanent in June of the same year and she resigned from Alaska Pacific University at that time. Davidson later became CEO of the Consortium as well. She left the Consortium in May 2024.

== Early and personal life ==
Davidson was born in Bethel, Alaska. Her mother is Yup'ik, and her father is originally from Port Orchard, Washington. She grew up both in Bethel and the nearby Aniak. Davidson is an enrolled tribal member of the Orutsararmiut Native Council.

In 1992, Davidson graduated from University of Alaska Southeast with a Bachelor of Education. Davidson also holds a degree in law from the University of New Mexico, obtained in 1998. After she graduated, she worked as a lawyer for the Alaska Native Tribal Health Consortium.

== Career ==
Davidson has previously served as Senior Director of Legal and Intergovernmental Affairs for the Alaska Native Tribal Health Consortium, and as Chair of the Tribal Technical Advisory Group to the Centers for Medicare and Medicaid Services for ten years. Part of her work there included getting veterans in rural areas access to healthcare through tribal clinics, and creating rural dental clinic programs employing mid-level dental professionals to improve access to dental care.

In December 2014, Davidson was appointed Commissioner of the Alaska Department of Health and Social Services. During her tenure there, she worked on Alaska's Medicaid expansion alongside Governor Walker.

On October 16, 2018, Davidson was sworn in as lieutenant governor after an emergency cabinet meeting in the wake of Byron Mallott's resignation. She is Alaska’s first female Alaska Native lieutenant governor. Upon being sworn in, she briefly became the running mate of incumbent Governor Bill Walker in his 2018 re-election campaign before he dropped out of the race on October 19.

In April 2020, Davidson became the 12th president of Alaska Pacific University. She was the first woman to serve as president of the university.

On March 12, 2021, Davidson was named interim president of the Alaska Native Tribal Health Consortium. She took a leave of absence from Alaska Pacific University at that time. Davidson's presidency of the Consortium became permanent on June 14, 2021 and she resigned from the presidency of Alaska Pacific University. Three years later, on May 7, 2024 the Alaska Native Tribal Health Consortium unexpectedly announced that Davidson had left her positions as president and CEO. No explanation was given.

== See also ==
- List of minority governors and lieutenant governors in the United States

== Notes ==
Political offices
Preceded by Byron Mallott	Lieutenant Governor of Alaska; 2018	Succeeded by Kevin Meyer
