= Sally Smith (politician) =

American politician

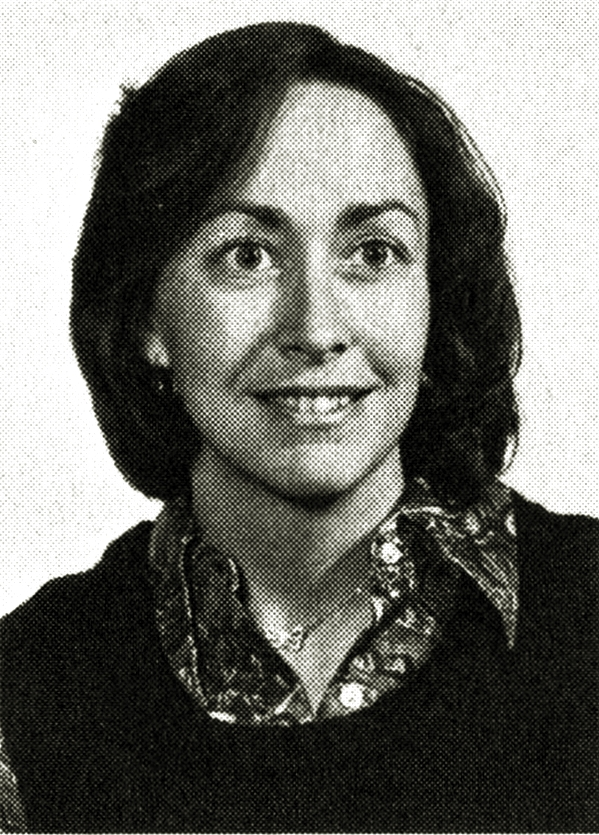

11th Mayor of Juneau
- In office October 16, 2000 – October 27, 2003
- Preceded by: Dennis Egan
- Succeeded by: Bruce Botelho

Member of the Alaska House of Representatives from the 20th district
- In office January 10, 1977 – January 16, 1983

Personal details
- Born: Sarah J. Smith; January 23, 1945 (age 81) Pekin, Illinois, U.S.
- Party: Democratic
- Education: University of Illinois at Urbana–Champaign
- Profession: Government official, politician

Sarah J. Smith (born January 23, 1945) is an American politician. She was a member of the Alaska Legislature in the 1970s and 1980s, and the mayor of Juneau, Alaska, from 2000 to 2003. She later worked as a field representative for United States Senator Mark Begich.

== Early life and education ==
Smith was born in Pekin, Illinois on January 23, 1945. She graduated from Pekin Community High School in 1963, then attended the University of Illinois at Urbana–Champaign, where she graduated with a bachelor of science in education in 1967.

== Career ==
Smith moved to Fairbanks, Alaska in 1969. Before entering politics, she worked a variety of jobs, including as a hotel desk clerk, office manager for the Tundra Times, and an expeditor for construction company H. W. Blackstock. From 1971 to 1974, she also held various positions in Alaska state government, including in the office of governor William A. Egan and in the Department of Community and Regional Affairs.

Smith worked for the Fairbanks-based nonprofit Northern Alaska Environmental Center.

=== Politics ===
Smith served three terms in the Alaska House of Representatives from 1977 to 1983 as a Democrat representing the 20th District, a six-member district (which was without designated seats and elected at-large) covering the Fairbanks North Star Borough and several outlying areas, including Fort Greely.

Following her service in the legislature, in which she traveled to Juneau (the state's capital) for legislative sessions, Smith moved to Juneau permanently in 1984, and worked for the state's Department of Administration (under the Division of Retirement and Benefits) and Department of Revenue.

==== 2000 regular election ====
She ran for the office of mayor of Juneau in the general election held on October 3, 2000. She raised $15,434 for her campaign. Her narrow win over Jamie Parsons was partly attributed to fellow candidate Mark Farmer's withdrawal from the race.

Candidate	Votes
Mark Farmer	435
Jamie Parsons	5,129
Sally Smith	5,349
Patty Zimmerman	523
Write-in	80

==== Mayor of Juneau ====
As mayor, Smith opposed moving the seat of the state government out of Juneau. In 2002, she appointed a task force to submit a bid to host the 2006 Arctic Winter Games; the bid was unsuccessful, losing to the one from Kenai Peninsula Borough, Alaska. Smith was a co-chairwoman of the organizing committee for the portion of the 2002 Winter Olympics torch relay that would run through Juneau on January 24, 2002, an event which was overshadowed by the unfurling of a banner by students at Juneau-Douglas High School reading "Bong Hits 4 Jesus", which ultimately resulted in the U.S. Supreme Court case Morse v. Frederick.

==== 2003 regular election ====
Smith initially intended to seek reelection in 2003, but later opted out of the race, instead endorsing Bruce Botelho, who would be elected mayor.

== Personal life ==
Smith lived near Lawson Creek on Douglas Island, in a small neighborhood between Douglas and West Juneau, during her time as mayor.
