= Charlie Cole (lawyer) =

American lawyer

Charles Cole

Attorney General of Alaska
- In office December 8, 1990 – January 1994
- Governor: Wally Hickel
- Preceded by: Douglas Baily
- Succeeded by: Bruce M. Botelho

Personal details
- Born: October 10, 1927 (age 98) Yakima, Washington
- Party: Republican
- Education: Stanford University Law School
- Occupation: Attorney at Law

Charles E. Cole (born October 10, 1927) was the Attorney General of Alaska from December 1990 until January 1994.

== Early career ==
Cole came to Alaska in 1954, and commenced his personal law practice in 1957.

Cole was inducted to the Alaska Interior Baseball Hall of Fame in 2011.

== Attorney General ==
Cole served as Attorney General of Alaska during the second governorship of Wally Hickel. He was honored by the Alaska Bar Association for his service for the state as Attorney General in 2011.
