= List of mayors of Juneau, Alaska =

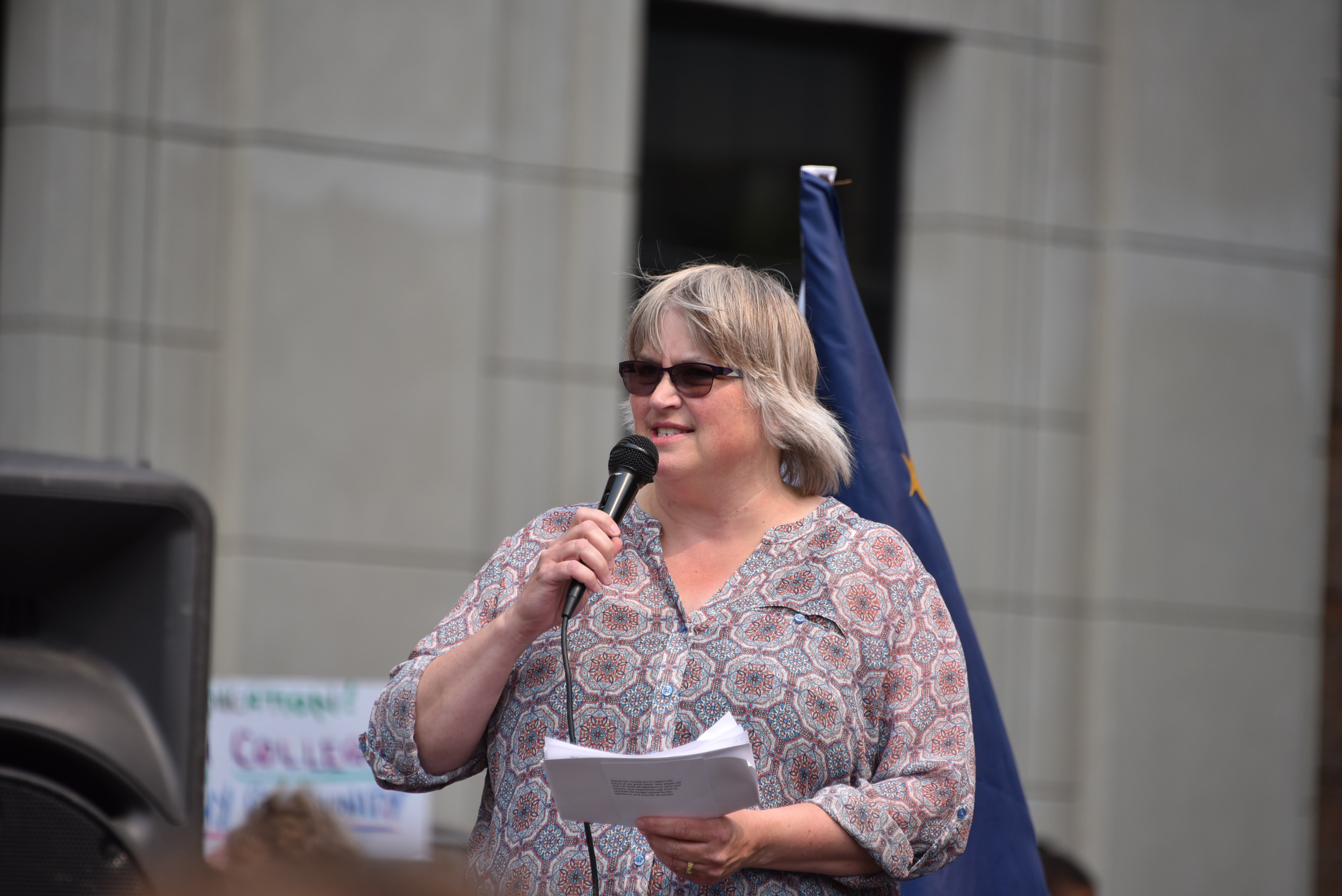
Incumbent mayor Beth Weldon speaks in front of the Alaska State Capitol in July 2019.

Juneau, Alaska, presently incorporated as a unified home rule municipality called the City and Borough of Juneau, was designated the capital of Alaska on June 6, 1900. The organic act passed by the U.S. Congress which established Juneau as the capital also allowed Alaskan communities to incorporate for the first time. Sitka and Nome both established "provisional governments" prior to this; Juneau did not follow suit, but did provide limited public services prior to incorporation, such as fire protection and school instruction.

Following the passage of the organic act, Juneau's incorporation petition was certified and the first election of officials occurred on June 29, 1900. Douglas, located a short distance southwest of Juneau across Gastineau Channel, followed suit by incorporating on March 29, 1902. Twenty-eight individuals served as the mayor of Juneau, Alaska, including three acting mayors, while another twenty-five individuals served as mayor of Douglas, Alaska.

The Greater Juneau Borough was incorporated in October 1963, established by an act of the state legislature earlier that year (Chapter 52, Session Laws of Alaska 1963) which required the most populous election districts in the state to incorporate as boroughs by January 1, 1964. The borough, the first to incorporate as a first-class borough, encompassed the two incorporated cities, several surrounding suburbs and smaller settlements on both sides of Gastineau Channel and along Lynn Canal, plus thousands of square miles of surrounding wilderness. Several years after the borough's incorporation, the legislature passed a bill allowing for boroughs and cities to unify (or merge). Several years after that, Juneau, Douglas and the borough unified to form the current municipality, which incorporated on July 1, 1970. As of the office's last election in 2018, sixteen people have served as mayor of Juneau under this government.

== Mayors of the City of Juneau, Alaska (1900–1970) ==
Juneau was incorporated on June 29, 1900, and was a home rule city prior to unification.

| No. | Image | Name (birth–death) | Took office | Left office |
|---|---|---|---|---|
| Acting | | John F. Malony (1857–1919) | 1900 | 1900 |
| 1 | | Arthur K. Delaney (1841–1905) | 1900 | 1901 |
| 2 | | George Forrest (c. 1870–[?]) | 1901 | 1902 |
| 3 | | Ohlin H. Adsit (1855–1909) | 1902 | 1904 |
| (2) | | George Forrest (c. 1870–[?]) | 1904 | 1905 |
| 4 | | John F. Malony (1857–1919) | 1905 | 1906 |
| 5 | | Herman Tripp (1859–1939) | 1906 | 1907 |
| (2) | | George Forrest (c. 1870–[?]) | 1907 | 1908 |
| 6 | | Emery Valentine (1858–1930) | 1908 | 1912 |
| 7 | | Harry Bishop (c. 1869–1920) | 1912 | 1913 |
| 8 | | Charles Carter (1870–1961) | 1913 | 1914 |
| 9 | | John Reck (1865–c. 1950) | 1914 | 1916 |
| 10 | | Benjamin D. Stewart (1878–1976) | 1916 | 1917 |
| (6) | | Emery Valentine (1858–1930) | 1917 | 1919 |
| 11 | | J. Latimer Gray | 1919 | 1920 |
| 12 | | R. E. Robertson (1885–1961) | 1920 | 1923 |
| 13 | | Isadore Goldstein (1883–1959) | 1923 | 1925 |
| 14 | | J. J. Connors (1876–1951) | 1925 | 1927 |
| 15 | | Thomas Judson (1882–1938) | 1927 | 1933 |
| (13) | | Isadore Goldstein (1883–1959) | 1933 | 1937 |
| (15) | | Thomas Judson (1882–1938) | 1937 | 1938 |
| 16 | | Harry Lucas (1890–1949) | 1938 | 1944 |
| 17 | | A. B. Hayes | 1944 | 1945 |
| 18 | | Ernest Parsons | 1945 | 1946 |
| 19 | | Waino Hendrickson (1896–1983) | 1946 | 1953 |
| 20 | | Bert McDowell (1904–c. 1975) | 1953 | 1955 |
| 21 | | M. L. "Molly" MacSpadden (1903–1961) | 1955 | 1959 |
| 22 | | Lauris Parker (1918–2003) | 1959 | 1961 |
| Acting | | J. Wayne Johnson | 1961 | 1961 |
| Acting | | A. W. Boddy (c. 1909–1987) | 1961 | 1961 |
| (22) | | Lauris Parker (1918–2003) | 1961 | 1967 |
| 23 | | Timothy O'Day | 1967 | 1967 |
| 24 | | Joseph George | 1967 | 1969 |
| 25 | | Joseph McLean (1917–2012) | 1969 | 1970 |

== Mayors of the City of Douglas, Alaska (1902–1970) ==
Douglas was incorporated on March 29, 1902, and was also a home rule city prior to unification.

| No. | Image | Name (birth–death) | Took office | Left office |
|---|---|---|---|---|
| 1 | | Charles Hopp | 1902 | 1903 |
| 2 | | Frank Bach | 1903 | 1904 |
| (1) | | Charles Hopp | 1904 | 1905 |
| 3 | | William Stubbins | 1905 | 1907 |
| 4 | | M. S. Hudson | 1907 | 1908 |
| 5 | | M. J. O'Connor | 1908 | 1912 |
| (3) | | William Stubbins | 1912 | 1913 |
| (5) | | M. J. O'Connor | 1913 | 1915 |
| 6 | | Peter Johnson | 1915 | 1916 |
| (5) | | M. J. O'Connor | 1916 | 1917 |
| 7 | | Elmer Smith | 1917 | 1920 |
| 8 | | F. A. J. Gallwas | 1920 | 1921 |
| 9 | | James Cristae | 1921 | 1923 |
| (8) | | F. A. J. Gallwas | 1923 | 1925 |
| 10 | | J. O. Kirkham | 1925 | 1926 |
| 11 | | Neis Anderson | 1926 | 1928? |
| 12 | | J. R. Guerin | 1928 | 1929 |
| 13 | | L. W. Kilburn | 1929 | 1932 |
| 14 | | John Feusi | 1932 | 1933 |
| 15 | | Guy Smith | 1933 | 1934 |
| 16 | | Albert Goetz | 1934 | 1937 |
| (13) | | L. W. Kilburn | 1937 | 1941 |
| 17 | | Robert Bonner, Jr. | 1941 | 1942 |
| 18 | | Erwin Hachmeister | 1942 | 1943 |
| 19 | | Elton Engstrom (1905–1963) | 1943 | 1944 |
| 20 | | James Parsons | 1944 | 1945 |
| 21 | | Marcus Jensen (1908–2001) | 1945 | 1947 |
| 22 | | Mike Pusich (1896–1953) | 1947 | 1953 |
| 23 | | William Boehl (1914–2000) | 1953 | 1961 |
| (21) | | Marcus Jensen (1908–2001) | 1961 | 1964 |
| 24 | | Guy Russo (1921–2006) | 1964 | 1969 |
| 25 | | Robert Savikko (1927–1972) | 1969 | 1970 |

== Mayors of the Greater Juneau Borough, Alaska (1963–1970) ==
| No. | Image | Name (birth–death) | Took office | Left office |
|---|---|---|---|---|
| 1 | | Claude Millsap, Jr. (1920–) | 1963 | 1967 |
| 2 | | Myrton R. Charney (1931–2013) | 1967 | 1970 |

== Mayors of the City and Borough of Juneau, Alaska (1970–present) ==
| No. | Image | Name (birth–death) | Took office | Left office |
|---|---|---|---|---|
| 1 | | Joseph McLean (1917–2012) | 1970 | 1973 |
| 2 | | William A. Macomber | 1973 | October 7, 1975 |
| 3 | | Virginia Kline | October 7, 1975 | 1976 |
| 4 | | William D. "Bill" Overstreet (1926–2013) | 1976 | 1983 |
| 5 | | Fran Ulmer (1947–) | 1983 | 1985 |
| 6 | | Ernest Polley (c. 1937–1997) | October 14, 1985 | October 10, 1988 |
| 7 | | Bruce Botelho (1948–) | October 10, 1988 | October 14, 1991 |
| 8 | | Jamie Parsons (1941–2015) | October 14, 1991 | October 10, 1994 |
| 9 | | Byron Mallott (1943–2020) | October 10, 1994 | February 13, 1995 |
| 10 | | Dennis Egan (1947–2022) | February 13, 1995 | October 9, 2000 |
| 11 | | Sally Smith (1945–) | October 9, 2000 | October 20, 2003 |
| (7) | | Bruce Botelho (1948–) | October 20, 2003 | October 11, 2012 |
| 12 | | Merrill Sanford (1947–) | October 11, 2012 | October 20, 2015 |
| 13 | | Greg Fisk (1945–2015) | October 20, 2015 | November 30, 2015 |
| 14 | | Mary Becker (acting) | November 30, 2015 | March 28, 2016 |
| 15 | | Ken Koelsch (c. 1945–) | March 28, 2016 | October 15, 2018 |
| 16 | | Beth Weldon (1965–) | October 15, 2018 | incumbent |
