= Jamie Parsons =

American civil servant, politician and businessman

Mayor of Juneau, Alaska
- In office October 1991 – October 4, 1994
- Deputy: Dennis Egan
- Preceded by: Bruce Botelho
- Succeeded by: Byron Mallott

Personal details
- Born: James McClary Parsons; 1941 Sherbrooke, Quebec
- Died: December 26, 2015 (aged 74) Mercer Island, Washington
- Spouse: Mary Beth Parsons

James McClary Parsons (1941 – December 26, 2015) was an American civil servant, politician and businessman who served as the Mayor of Juneau, Alaska, from 1991 until 1994. Parsons originally moved to Juneau in 1972 to become the city's first Director of Parks and Recreation. He served on the Assembly of the City and Borough of Juneau, Alaska, during the 1980s before being elected mayor in 1991. Parsons declined to seek re-election for a second term, Instead, Parsons devoted his attention to the defeat of a 1994 statewide ballot initiative, which would have moved the Alaskan state capital from Juneau to Wasilla. He has been widely credited with the rejection of the proposal by voters.

== Biography ==
In 1972, Parsons moved to Juneau from Kent, Washington, to become the first Director of Parks and Recreation. He then worked for the city as a civil servant in various roles throughout the 1970s. Parsons then served on the Assembly of the City and Borough of Juneau, from 1981 until 1989.

Parsons was elected Mayor of Juneau on October 2, 1991, with 64% of the vote.

Parsons also spearheaded a campaign to form an informal committee to improve the quality of life in Juneau. The committee, which became known as the Alaska Committee, was created in 1994. He later served as its chairman.

He declined to seek a second term in 1994. Instead, Parsons focused on the defeat of a 1994 ballot initiative, which would have moved the state capital from Juneau to Wasilla, in Southcentral Alaska. Parsons campaigned statewide against the initiative. He traveled throughout Southeast Alaska to encourage the high voter turnout needed to defeat the measure. Parsons has been credited with defeating the proposed move to Wasilla, which voters rejected by a margin of 116,277 (54.7%) to 96,398 (45.3%). According to Christopher Clark, who worked for Parsons as his Anchorage field coordinator against the 1994 initiative, "He helped organize it. He'd go out door-to-door. He'd give speeches. He'd talk to editorial board meetings. He’d go to newspaper interviews. And it all worked. Jamie was with me in Anchorage on the night of the election returns and we were jubilant. We once again had dodged a bullet and managed to keep the capital here in Juneau and Jamie deserves a lot of the credit for that."

Parsons proposed an idea to televise live coverage of the Alaska Legislature, similar to C-SPAN. His proposal developed into "Gavel to Gavel Alaska," which originally aired on KTOO-TV.

Parsons also served as the CEO of the Juneau Chamber of Commerce from 2001 to 2003. He departed in Chamber in 2003 after his wife, a retired elementary school teacher, accepted a two-year teaching position at the Cairo American College.

In 2000, Parsons attempted to reclaim his former job as Mayor of Juneau. On October 3, 2000, Parsons was narrowly defeated in the general election by Sally Smith by just 209 votes. Smith received 4,820 votes, while Parsons garnered 4,611 votes.

Jamie Parsons battled multiple myeloma, a form of cancer, for more than 10 years, following a diagnosis in 2005. He died from the disease at his home in Mercer Island, Washington, where he had been undergoing treatment, on December 26, 2015, at the age of 74. He was survived by his wife, Mary Beth Parsons, and three children, Rob, Sara and Andrew. His memorial service was scheduled to be held at Centennial Hall in Juneau on July 16, 2016.

Political offices
Preceded by Bruce Botelho	Mayor of Juneau; 1991–1994	Succeeded by Byron Mallott
