= Byron Mallott =

American politician (1943–2020)

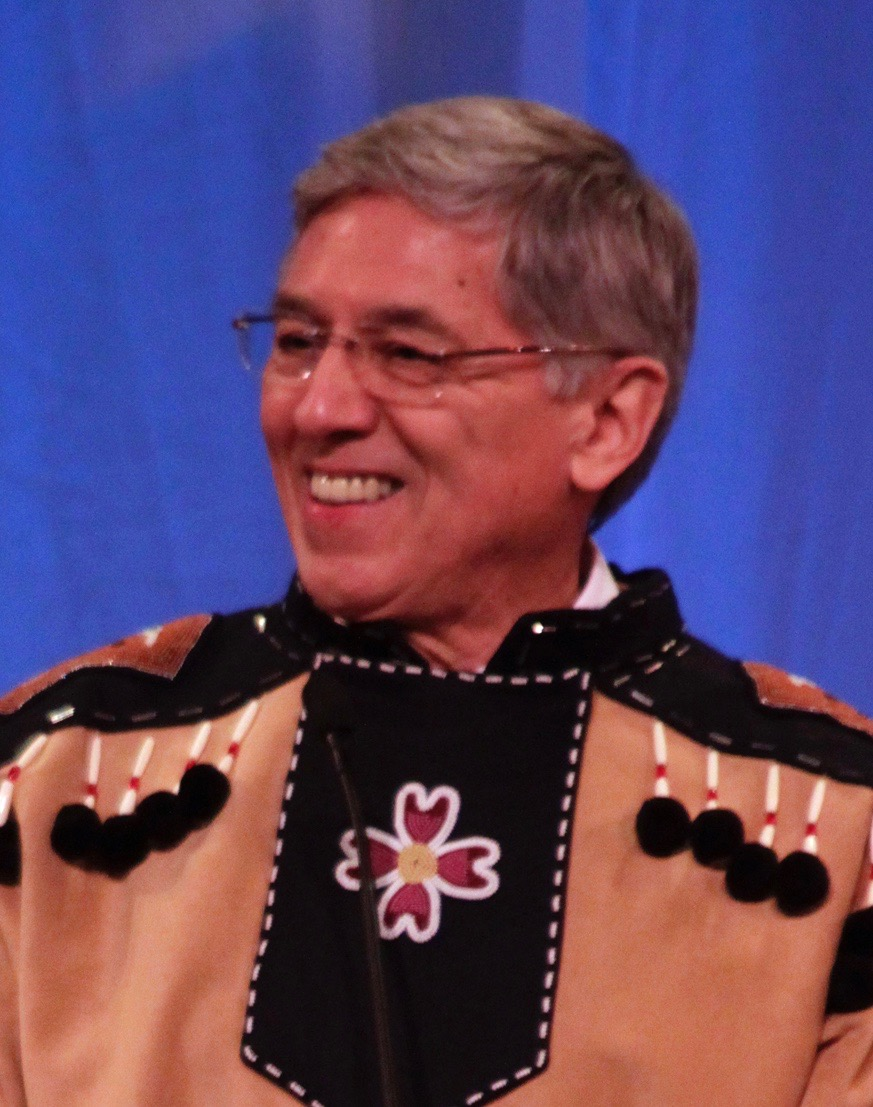
- Mallott in 2014

12th Lieutenant Governor of Alaska
- In office December 1, 2014 – October 16, 2018
- Governor: Bill Walker
- Preceded by: Mead Treadwell
- Succeeded by: Valerie Davidson

Mayor of Juneau
- In office October 4, 1994 – February 13, 1995
- Preceded by: Jamie Parsons
- Succeeded by: Dennis Egan

Commissioner of the Alaska Department of Community and Regional Affairs
- In office 1972–1974
- Governor: Bill Egan
- Preceded by: Position established
- Succeeded by: Lee McAnerney

Mayor of Yakutat
- In office 1965–1966
- Preceded by: Jay Mallot
- Succeeded by: Jerry Nelson

Personal details
- Born: Byron Ivar Mallott; April 6, 1943 Yakutat, Territory of Alaska, U.S.
- Died: May 8, 2020 (aged 77) Anchorage, Alaska, U.S.
- Citizenship: American; Yakutat Tlingit Tribe
- Party: Democratic
- Other political affiliations: Independent (2014–2018)
- Spouse: Antoinette Mallott
- Children: 5
- Education: Western Washington University (attended)

Byron Ivar Mallott (April 6, 1943 – May 8, 2020) was an American politician, elder, tribal activist, and business executive from the state of Alaska. Mallott was an Alaska Native leader of Tlingit heritage and the leader of the Kwaash Ké Kwaan clan. He was the 12th lieutenant governor of Alaska from December 2014 until his resignation on October 16, 2018. He also previously served as the mayor of Yakutat, the mayor of Juneau, the president of the Alaska Federation of Natives and the executive director of the Alaska Permanent Fund.

Mallott was the Democratic nominee for Governor of Alaska in 2014, until he agreed to merge his campaign with that of independent candidate Bill Walker and become Walker's running mate. Walker and Mallott won the election and were sworn in on December 1, 2014. In 2018, Mallott abruptly resigned after it was discovered he made inappropriate overtures to a woman.

== Early life and education ==
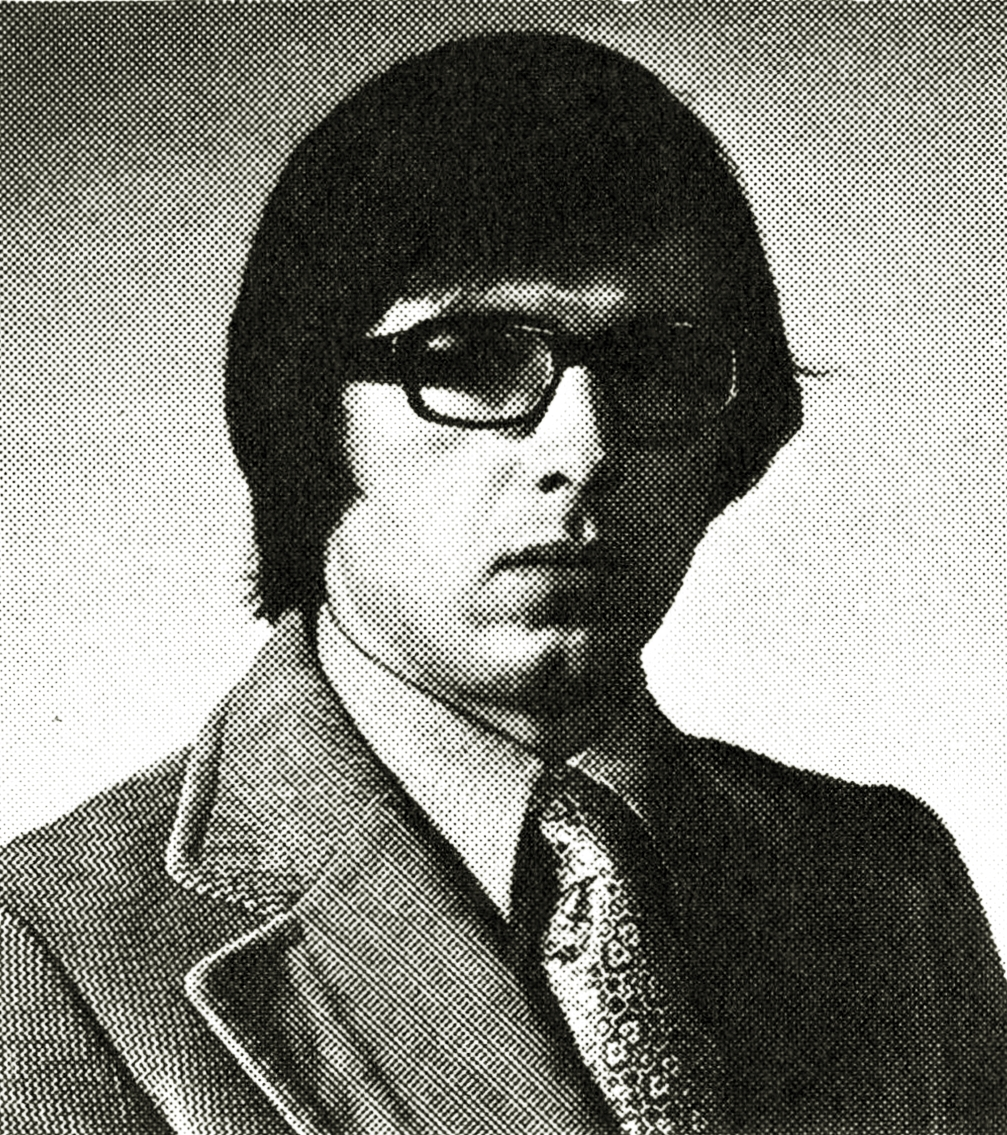
Mallott as DCRA commissioner in 1973

Mallott was born on April 6, 1943, in Yakutat in the Territory of Alaska, to Jay B. Mallott and Emma M. Brown. Mallott was an Alaskan Native of the Tlingit tribe. His Tlingit name was Dux̱ da neiḵ, K'oo del ta', which means "'a person who would lead us into the future'". Mallott's father established a general store in a spare room of the family home in 1946. Mallott spent most of his childhood living in Yakutat.

At age 13, Mallott began attending Pius X Mission, a Catholic boarding school located in Skagway, Alaska. He graduated from Sheldon Jackson High School and studied for several years at Western Washington State College in Bellingham, Washington.

== Career ==
Mallott's political career began in 1965 when his father, who served as Yakutat's mayor for the vast majority of the position's existence, died. He left college and returned to Yakutat, running to replace him, and won the election. He left office before the expiration of his term, taking a job in the office of Governor Bill Egan towards the end of Egan's first governorship. His job in the governor's office was focused on local government affairs, one of the few constitutionally mandated executive functions in Alaska. Mallott was the first Commissioner of the Department of Community and Regional Affairs.

After Egan was defeated for re-election by Walter Hickel in 1966, Mallott returned to Yakutat and served on the city council.

In 1968, Mallott received the Democratic nomination for the 5th district in the Alaska House of Representatives. In the general election he was narrowly defeated by Henry E. Reeves by twenty-three votes. Mallott posted the $250 for a recount, but the vote total remained the same. In 1969, Senator Mike Gravel appointed him to serve as a special assistant.

Mallott became chairman of Alaska's Reapportionment Board. On September 5, 1980, he resigned from the board for personal reasons.

In 1982, Mallott was appointed to the board of trustees of the Alaska Permanent Fund Corporation by Governor Jay Hammond to replace Elmer Rasmuson. In 1985, he was selected to serve as the chairman of the permanent fund; he later served as its executive director from 1995 to 2000.

=== Mayor of Juneau ===
Incumbent mayor Jamie Parsons declined to seek re-election in 1994 after one term in office. On August 16, 1994, Mallott announced that he would run in Juneau's mayoral election. He was elected mayor of Juneau in that municipality's 1994 general election. He resigned from office after he was selected to serve as the executive director of the Alaska Permanent Fund Corporation. Mallott faced harsh criticism when he initially announced that he could handle serving in both positions, leading to changing his mind and resigning the mayoral position. Mallott was succeeded as mayor by deputy mayor Dennis Egan.

=== Lieutenant Governor of Alaska ===
==== 2014 election ====
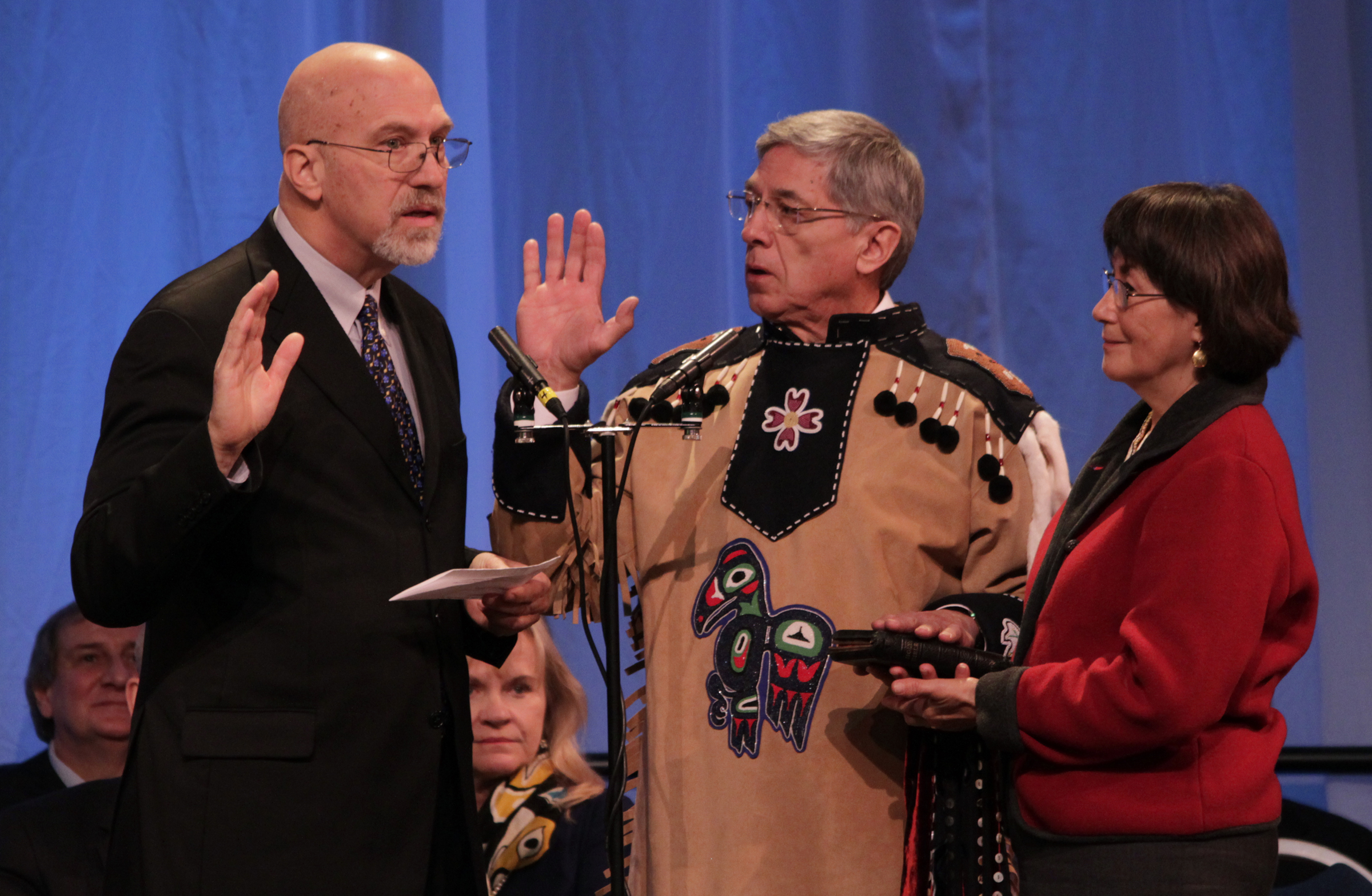
Mallott being sworn in as lieutenant governor of Alaska in 2014

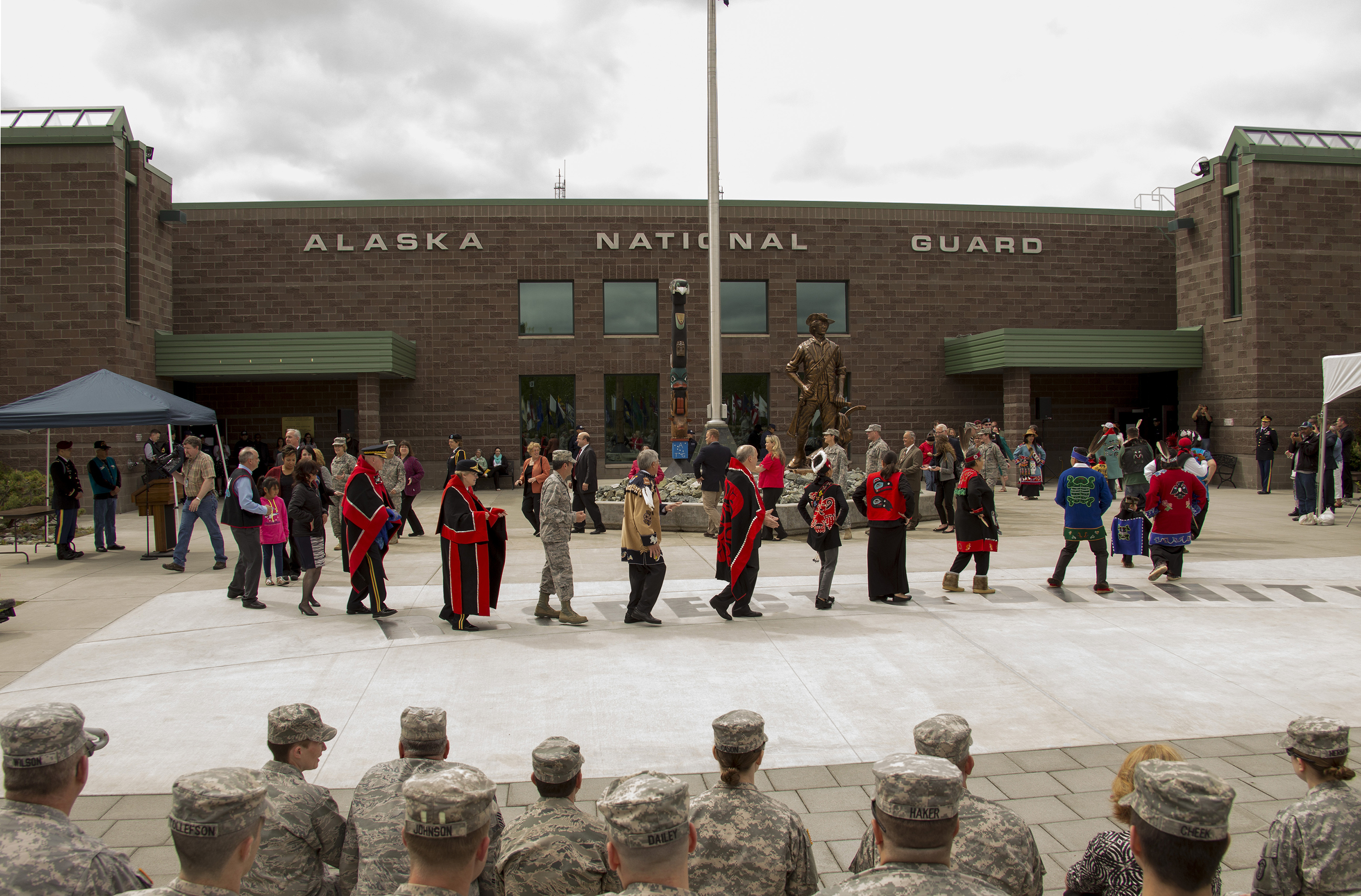
Alaska National Guard receives new commanding general

Mallott announced on September 2, 2013 that he was running for the Democratic nomination for governor of Alaska in the 2014 election. He won the Democratic gubernatorial primary with 80% of the vote on August 19, 2014.

Independent candidate Bill Walker and Mallott merged their campaigns on September 2 to appear on the November ballot as one independent campaign, which the Alaska Democratic Party endorsed. On this ticket, Walker ran for governor with Mallott as his running mate. Both candidates' respective prior running mates withdrew. They won the election on November 4, 2014, as there was a recount due to a close election result.

==== 2018 election ====
In 2017, Walker and Mallott registered to run for re-election on an independent ticket. Despite running for reelection as an independent, Mallott maintained his Democratic Party registration. Walker and Mallott faced a Republican ticket headed by state senator Mike Dunleavy and a Democratic ticket headed by former senator Mark Begich. Mallott resigned from office on October 16, and Walker—after briefly continuing his campaign with newly appointed Lieutenant Governor Valerie Davidson as his running mate–suspended his campaign on October 19.

==== Tenure ====
Mallott signed state marijuana regulations into effect in January 2016. In 2016, Raven Radio reported that Mallott had logged 280,000 Alaska Air Miles in the first two years of his tenure as lieutenant governor.

Mallott resigned his post as lieutenant governor on October 16, 2018, citing "inappropriate comments" that he had made to a woman whom Governor Walker refused to name. He was succeeded as lieutenant governor by Valerie Davidson, the former commissioner of the Alaska Department of Health and Social Services.

== Business career ==
In 1972, Mallott became a member of the newly formed Sealaska Corporation and was elected director. He served as chairman of the board from 1976 to 1983. In 1982, he was selected to serve as the CEO and kept his position until retirement on July 1, 1992. He also established a permanent fund for Sealaska shareholders. The fund had grown to a net worth of $100 million by the late 1990s. Mallott served on the board of Sealaska until 2014.

Mallott was also a founding director of the Alaska Commercial Fisheries and Agriculture Bank. He was also a director of the Seattle branch board of directors of the Federal Reserve Bank of San Francisco, and he served on the board of directors of the Federal Reserve Bank of San Francisco. He served as a director of Alaska Air Group and on the board of the National Alliance of Business.

Mallott was a clan leader of the KwaashKiKwaan clan of the Raven tribe of Yakutat. He served as President of the Alaska Federation of Natives (AFN) and received a "Citizen of the Year" award from AFN. Mallott served as president and CEO of the First Alaskans Foundation.

Mallott was appointed by Governor Tony Knowles as a co-chair of the Alaska Commission on Rural Governance and Empowerment. He also chaired the Nature Conservancy of Alaska and served as a director of the Alaska Public Radio Network.

== Personal life and death ==
Mallott was married to Antoinette (Toni) Mallott, a retired schoolteacher who spent most of her career teaching elementary grades in the Juneau School District. They had five children. The Mallotts lived in the West Juneau neighborhood of Juneau, located on Douglas Island near downtown Juneau.

Mallott suffered a heart attack at his home in Juneau on May 7, 2020, and was flown by a medical charter to Anchorage, where he died the following day at the age of 77.

== Electoral history ==
1968 Alaskan House of Representatives 5th district election
Party	Candidate	Votes	%	±%
Republican	Henry E. Reeves	696	50.84%	
Democratic	Byron Mallott	673	49.16%	
Total votes		1,269	100.00%	

1994 Juneau mayoral election
Party	Candidate	Votes	%	±%
Nonpartisan	Byron Mallott	7,968	76.46%	
Nonpartisan	Genji League	1,223	11.74%	
Nonpartisan	Alan Wicks	1,141	10.95%	
Nonpartisan	Write-ins	89	0.85%	
Total votes		10,421	100.00%	

2014 Alaska Democratic–Libertarian–Independence gubernatorial primary
Party	Candidate	Votes	%	±%
Democratic	Byron Mallott	42,327	66.89%	
Democratic	Phil Stoddard	10,514	16.62%	
Libertarian	Carolyn Clift	10,436	16.49%	
Total votes		63,277	100.00%	

2014 Alaska lieutenant gubernatorial election
Party	Candidate	Votes	%	±%
Independent	Byron Mallott	134,658	48.10%	+48.10%
Republican	Dan Sullivan	128,435	45.88%	−13.18%
Libertarian	Andrew C. Lee	8,985	3.21%	+2.16%
Constitution	Maria Rensel	6,987	2.50%	+2.50%
Independent	Write-ins	893	0.32%	−0.04%
Total votes		279,958	100.00%	

2018 Alaska lieutenant gubernatorial election
Party	Candidate	Votes	%	±%
Republican	Kevin Meyer	145,631	51.44%	+5.56%
Democratic	Debra L. Call	125,739	44.41%	−3.69%
Independent	Byron Mallott (incumbent)	5,757	2.03%	−46.07%
Libertarian	Carolyn F. Clift	5,402	2.03%	−1.30%
Independent	Write-ins	605	0.21%	−0.11%
Total votes		283,134	100.00%	

== See also ==
- List of minority governors and lieutenant governors in the United States

Political offices
Preceded by Jamie Parsons	Mayor of Juneau; 1994–1995	Succeeded by Dennis Egan
Preceded by Mead Treadwell	Lieutenant Governor of Alaska; 2014–2018	Succeeded by Valerie Davidson
Party political offices
Preceded by Ethan Berkowitz	Democratic nominee for Governor of Alaska; Withdrew; 2014	Succeeded by Bill Walker; Endorsed
