= Alaska State Capitol =

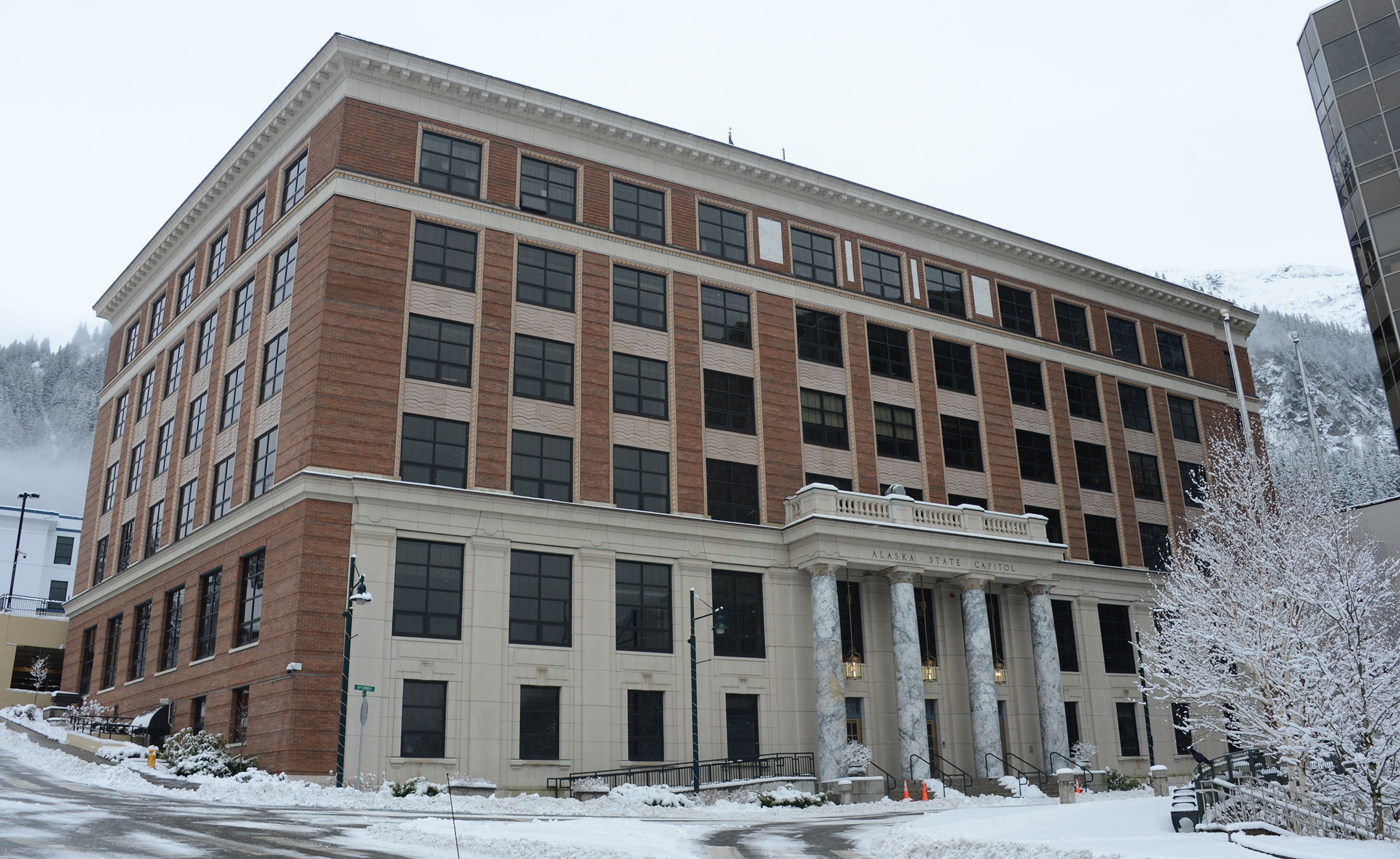

General information
- Architectural style: Neoclassical Architecture
- Location: Juneau, Alaska, U.S.
- Coordinates: 58°18′7.9″N 134°24′37.7″W
- Construction started: September 18, 1929; 97 years ago
- Completed: February 2, 1931; 95 years ago
- Inaugurated: February 14, 1931; 95 years ago

The Alaska State Capitol is the building that hosts the Alaska Legislature and the offices of the Governor of Alaska and Lieutenant Governor of Alaska. Located in the state's capital, Juneau, the building was opened on February 14, 1931, as a federal building. After Alaska gained statehood in 1959, the building became home to the Alaska Legislature and has retained the function ever since.

== History ==
Upon the purchase of Russian America, Sitka, Alaska became the Territory Capital in 1867. After the capital was moved to Juneau, the Legislature met in rented rooms around the city.

Construction for a capitol building was partly funded by the United States Congress, but they refused to give more funding. Local citizens managed to pay the rest of the cost for land, which was then given to the government. Construction on the building began on September 18, 1929, and it ended on February 2, 1931. The building, originally named the Federal and Territorial Building, was dedicated on February 14, 1931. It hosted federal services until 1959, when the Alaska Statehood Act granted Alaska permission to settle in the building.

There have been efforts made to relocate the capital away from Juneau. These began as early as 1960, where a proposal to move the government to the Cook Inlet area failed. The most recent attempt was in 2002.

== Architecture and interior ==
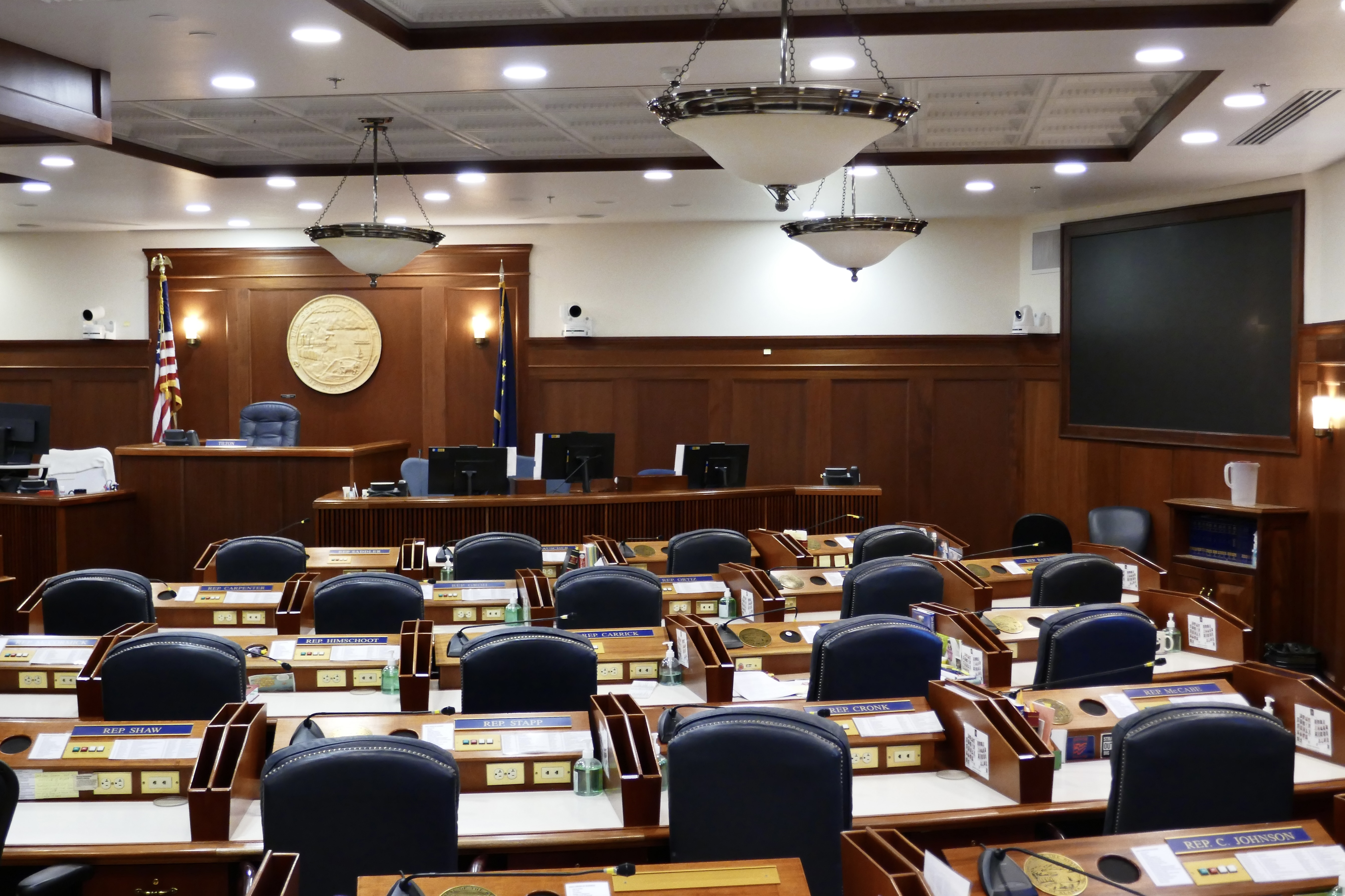
The chamber of the House of Representatives

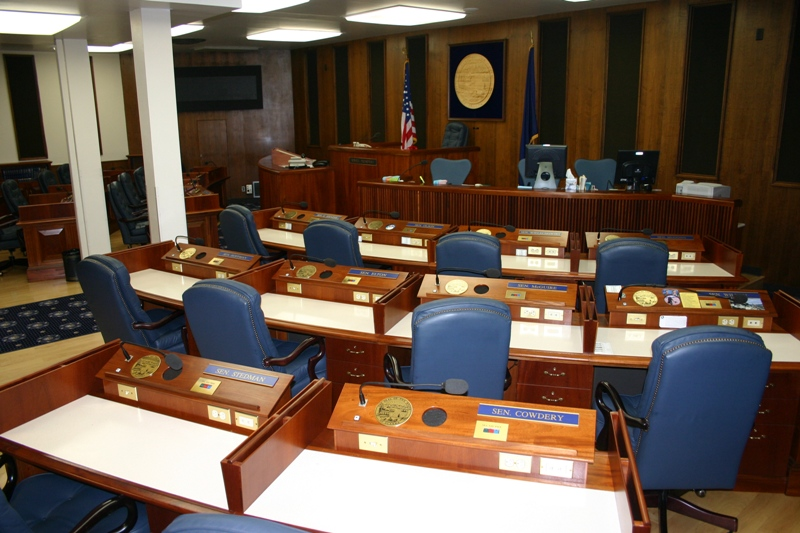
The Senate chamber

The building is six stories high and made from brick-faced reinforced concrete, with a facade of Indiana limestone on the first two floors. The portico has four columns made of Tokeen marble from Prince of Wales Island, which is also used for interior trim. Because it lacks the large landscaped grounds of most state capitols, it could appear to be simply an office building. It is one of only eleven state capitols (along with those of Florida, Hawaii, Louisiana, New Mexico, New York, North Dakota, Ohio, Oregon, Tennessee and Virginia) that do not feature a dome.

Outside the building is a replica of the Liberty Bell, of the type given to all states and territories by the federal government in 1950 to help raise support for savings bond drives.

The lobby features clay murals titled Harvest of the Land and Harvest of the Sea, representing hunting and fishing, as well as a bust of Alaska Native activist Elizabeth Peratrovich. Offices and committee rooms fill the ground and first floors.

The second floor houses the chambers of the Alaska Senate and Alaska House of Representatives, as well as committee rooms. The walls feature the work of early Juneau photographers Lloyd Winter and Percy Pond, and busts of the first two U.S. senators from Alaska, Bob Bartlett and Ernest Gruening.

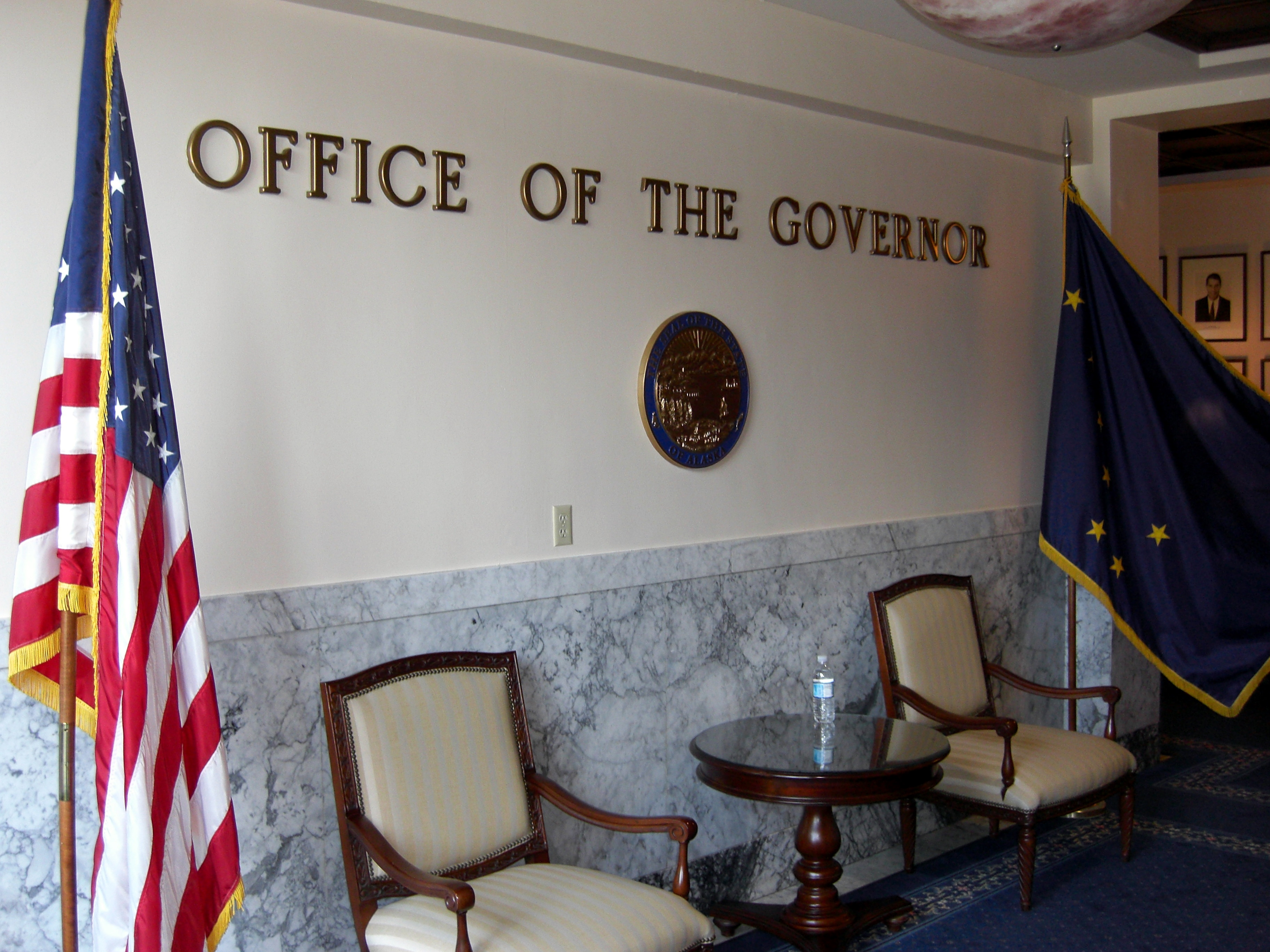
Governor of Alaska's office

The Alaska Governor and Lieutenant Governor's offices are located on the third floor. The executive office doors are made of black birch, with hand carvings depicting Alaskan industry. The "Hall of Governors" features portraits of governors and lieutenant governors of Alaska from the District of Alaska era to the present.

More legislative offices and committee rooms occupy the fourth floor. The fifth floor holds legislative finance committees.

Many areas of the building have been restored to their original 1930s appearance, especially on the second and fifth floors—the latter originally had federal courtrooms.

In 2012, the State of Alaska undertook a 4-year, $33 million project to provide seismic upgrades to the building as well as further restore the building to its original appearance. A statue of William H. Seward was erected in 2017 in front of the Capitol to commemorate the 1867 Alaska Purchase.

== Gallery ==
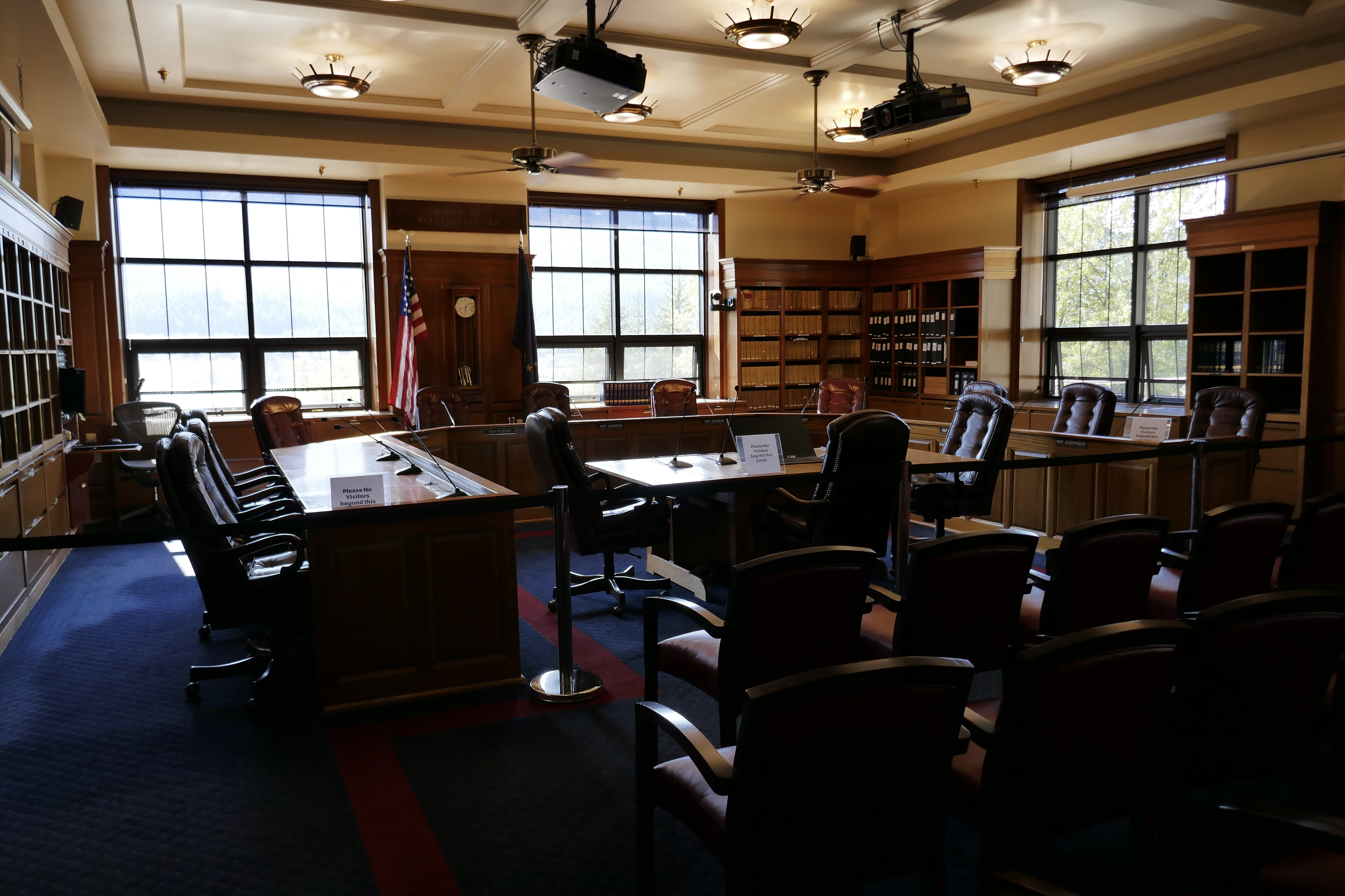
House Finance Committee room in the Alaska State Capitol

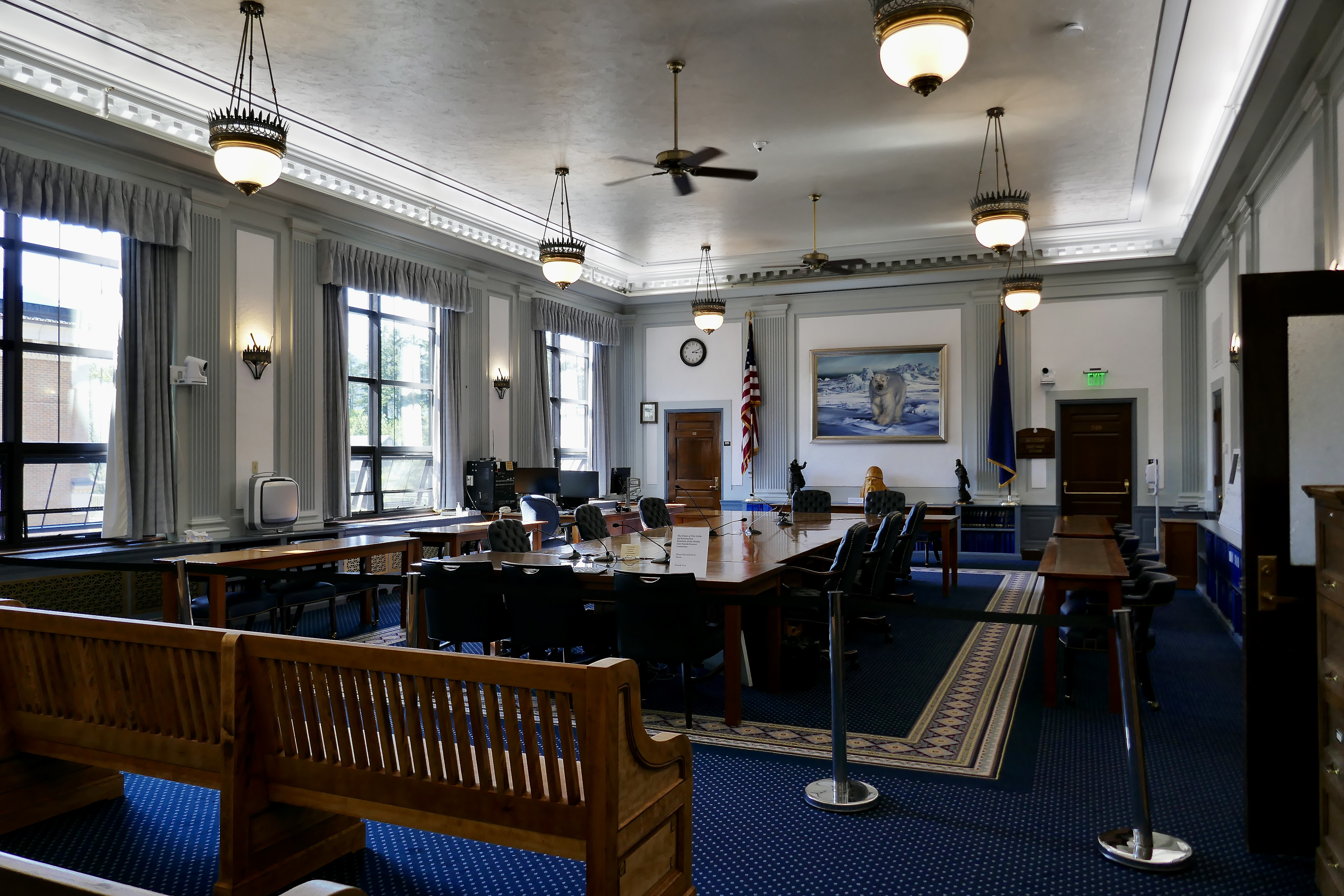
Senate Finance Committee room in the Alaska State Capitol

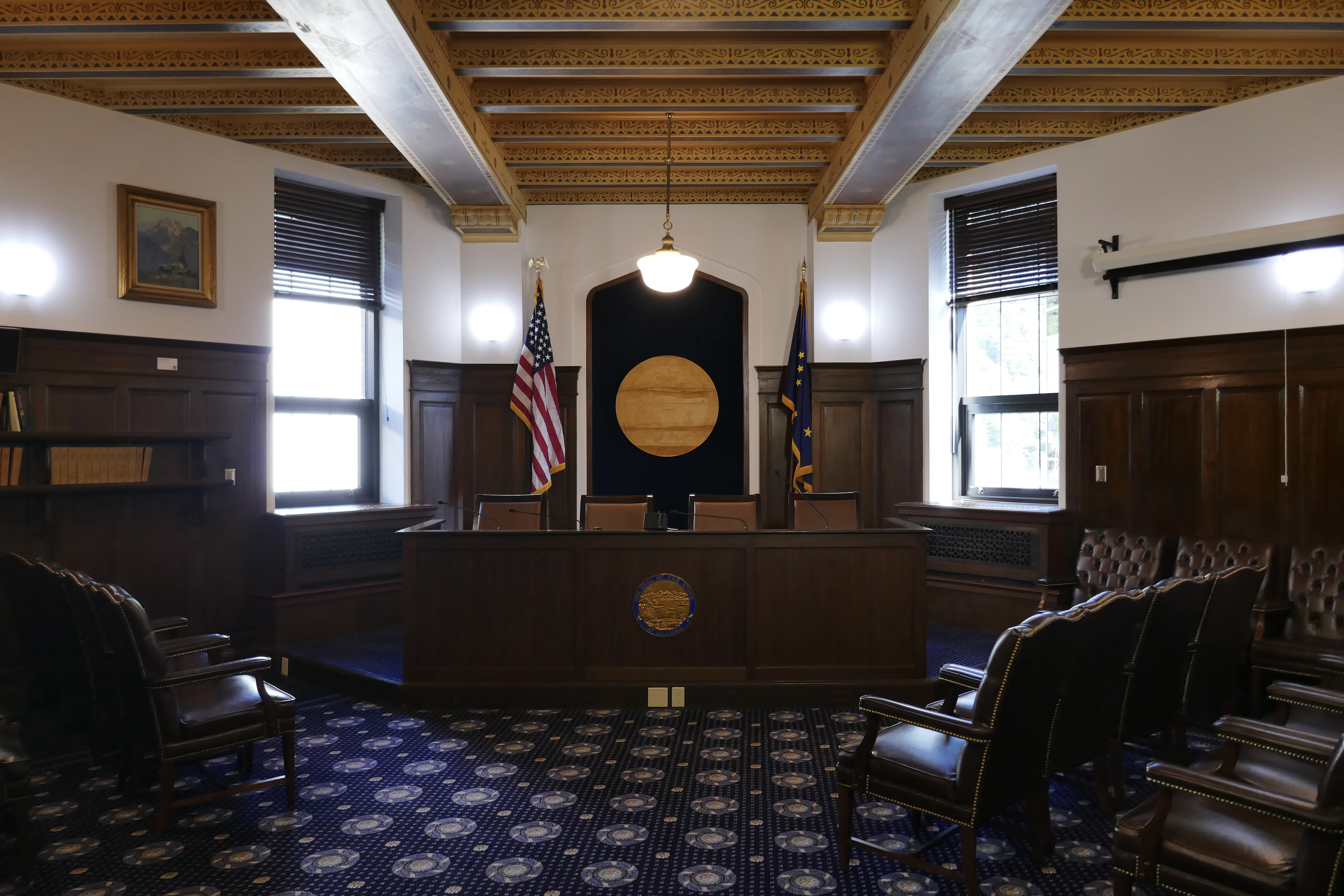
Speaker's Chambers in the Alaska State Capitol

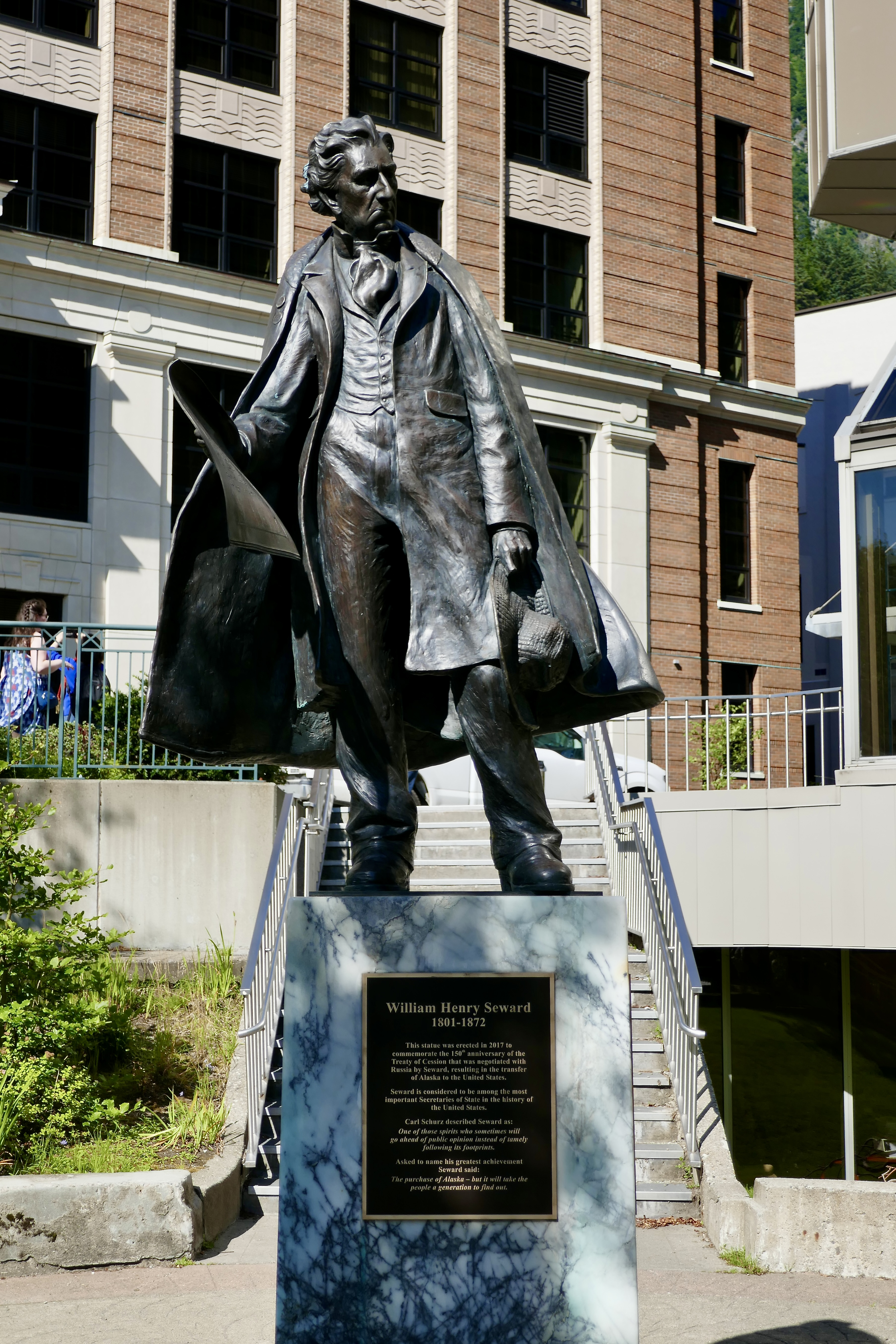
Statue of William H. Seward before the Alaska State Capitol

== See also ==
- List of Alaska State Legislatures
- List of state and territorial capitols in the United States
