= Juneau-Douglas High School =

Public high school in Juneau, Alaska, United States

Coordinates: 58.3052°N 134.4298°W

Juneau-Douglas High School: Yadaa.at Kalé

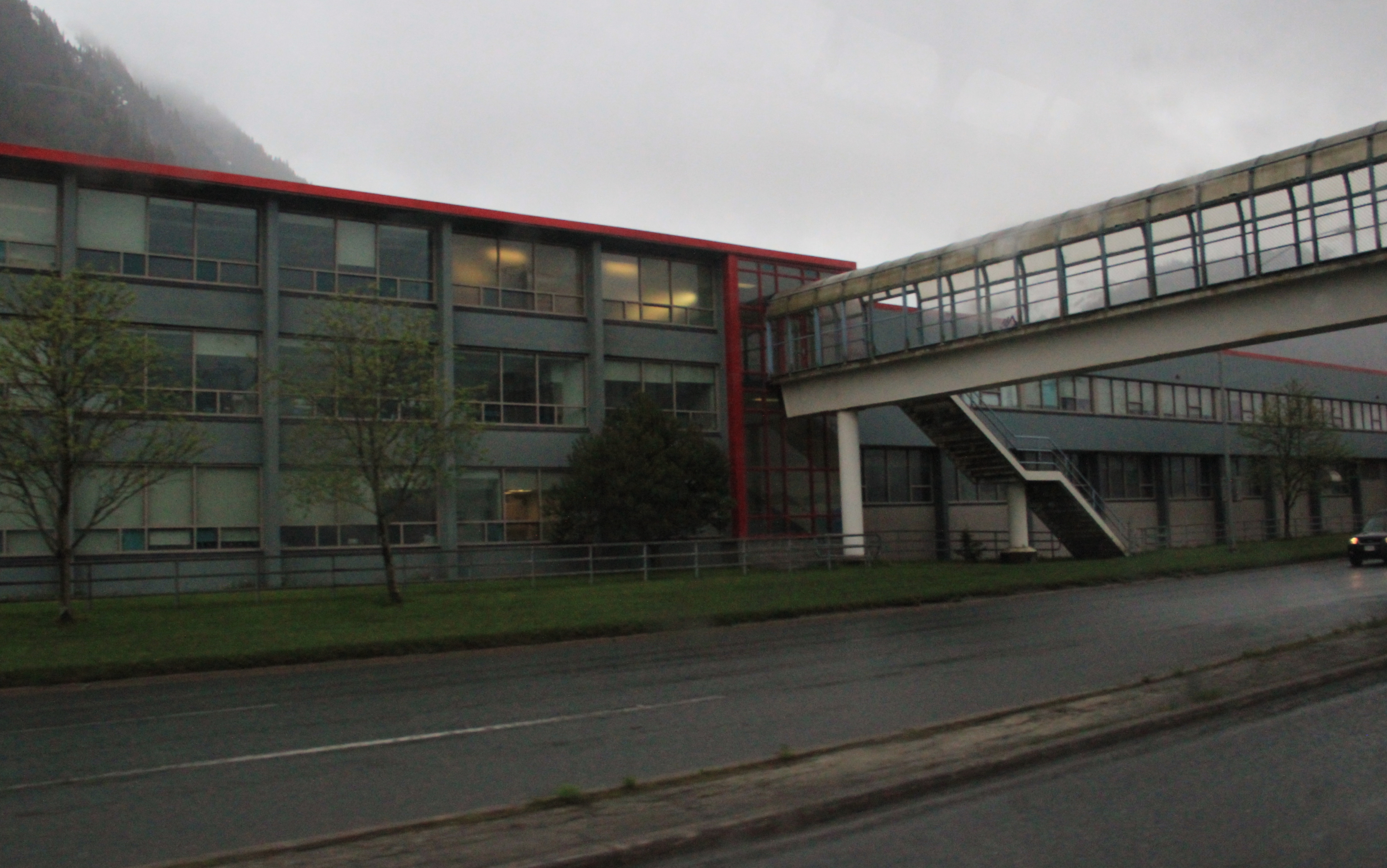
- Juneau-Douglas High School viewed from Alaska Route 7

Location
- 1639 Glacier Ave; Juneau, Alaska 99801; United States

Information
- Type: Public Secondary school
- Established: 1905 (121 years ago)
- Status: Open
- CEEB code: 020055
- Principal: Paula Casperson
- Teaching staff: 51.95 (on an FTE basis)
- Grades: 9–12
- Gender: Co-Ed
- Enrollment: 1,018 (2024–2025)
- Student to teacher ratio: 19.60
- Colors: Crimson & black
- Mascot: Bear
- Nickname: Crimson Bears
- Website: jdhs.juneauschools.org

Juneau-Douglas High School: Yadaa.at Kalé (abbreviated JDHS and named Juneau-Douglas High School through 2019) is one of two high schools in Juneau, Alaska. It is one of two high schools for the Juneau School District, the other being Yaaḵoosgé Daakahídi Alternative High School. As of the 2021–2022 school year, the school's principal is Paula Casperson.

In 2019, the phrase "Yadaa.at Kalé" was appended to the school's name to honor the original Tlingit heritage of Juneau. The phrase means "beautifully adorned face" in the Tlingit language, and refers to the name of the mountain which faces the school.

== History and symbols ==
The mascot of Juneau-Douglas High School is a fiercely roaring bear; the school's teams compete as the Crimson Bears.

JDHS has undergone extensive renovations, most notably to its main hall.

In 2003, the Áakʼw Kootéeyaa was installed in the school.

== Athletics ==
The Crimson Bears have seen success and won championships across several sports, including being the state champions in baseball two years in a row in 2002 and 2003, the state champions in boys' cross-country two years in a row in 2004 and 2005, the state softball champions during the 2004–2005 and 2009–2010 seasons, the 2004–2005 boys' track and field state champions, the 2004–2005 boys' swim and diving state champions and the girls' state champions the following year, and the state football champions in the 2005–2006 and 2007–2008 seasons. The Crimson Bears finished second overall in the high school state soccer championship in the 2005–2006 season. In 2008, the Crimson Bears won state titles in baseball, softball, and boys' soccer.

In the '06 summer season, the tennis team enjoyed victory in Fairbanks in an Alaska-wide tournament. In 2008 the Bears baseball, softball, and boys' soccer programs all won state titles. In 2010 both baseball and boys' soccer won state championships, and the boys' soccer team repeated in 2011 for a second straight state championship. The women's basketball team beat Wasilla to become the state champions in 2010. JDHS women's basketball lost to Wasilla the next year, in 2011, in the state championship game. In 2016, the JDHS boys varsity beat Dimond High School for the state title. JDHS Girls Varsity Soccer won the state title for the 2017–2018 school year, and the JDHS Cross Country team won the state championship for the 2018–2019 season.

In November 2017, the Juneau School District voted to merge JDHS's football team with Thunder Mountain High School's, citing travel costs and declining roster numbers. In February 2018, students from both schools voted on a nickname for the newly merged team, with "Thunder Bears" winning. In March, the nickname caused controversy when an alternate definition of the term was discovered to be a slur for someone "usually of Native American descent" who drank too much alcohol. On March 10, the school board voted 5–4 to reject the nickname, ordering the committee to pick a new one. The merged football team ultimately entered the 2018–2019 season without a mascot. In January 2019, the students choose the "Juneau Huskies" as the new mascot for the merged team.

JDHS's girls' soccer team won three consecutive state championships, in 2018, 2019, and 2021, where the 2020 season was canceled due to the COVID-19 pandemic.

== U.S. Supreme Court case ==
A sign displayed across the street from the school in 2002 kicked off a five-year dispute that reached the U.S. Supreme Court in the case of Morse v. Frederick. Student Joseph Fredrick and some friends displayed a joking sign on the sidewalk across the street from the school reading "BONG HiTS 4 JESUS" during the 2002 Winter Olympics torch relay when television cameras were present, and he was given a five-day disciplinary suspension by principal Deborah Morse for the sign being a violation of the school's anti-drug-use policy. Morse then doubled the length of the suspension after Frederick objected to the penalty and claimed it violated his right to free speech. Frederick filed suit, and different levels of court review produced different rulings about the validity of his claim of First Amendment protection. Ultimately, the Supreme Court sided with the school principal, saying that although the incident had occurred outside of the school campus and had not substantially disrupted educational activities, it had happened during an event in which the school had authorized the participation of the student body, and the sign could be interpreted as promoting the use of illegal drugs.

== Notable alumni ==
- Chad Bentz (1999), Major League Baseball pitcher
- Carlos Boozer (1999), professional basketball player, Olympic gold medalist and member of the Naismith Memorial Basketball Hall of Fame
- Douglas J. Eboch (1986), writer of the basis story for the 2002 film Sweet Home Alabama
- Hilary Lindh, former downhill skier for the United States Ski Team and Olympic silver medalist
