= 2020 Alaska House of Representatives election =

- November 3, 2020

All 40 seats in the Alaska House of Representatives 21 seats needed for a majority
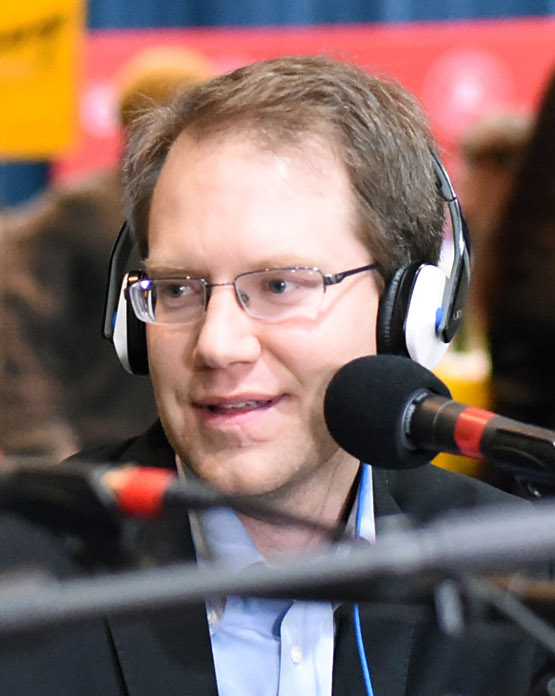

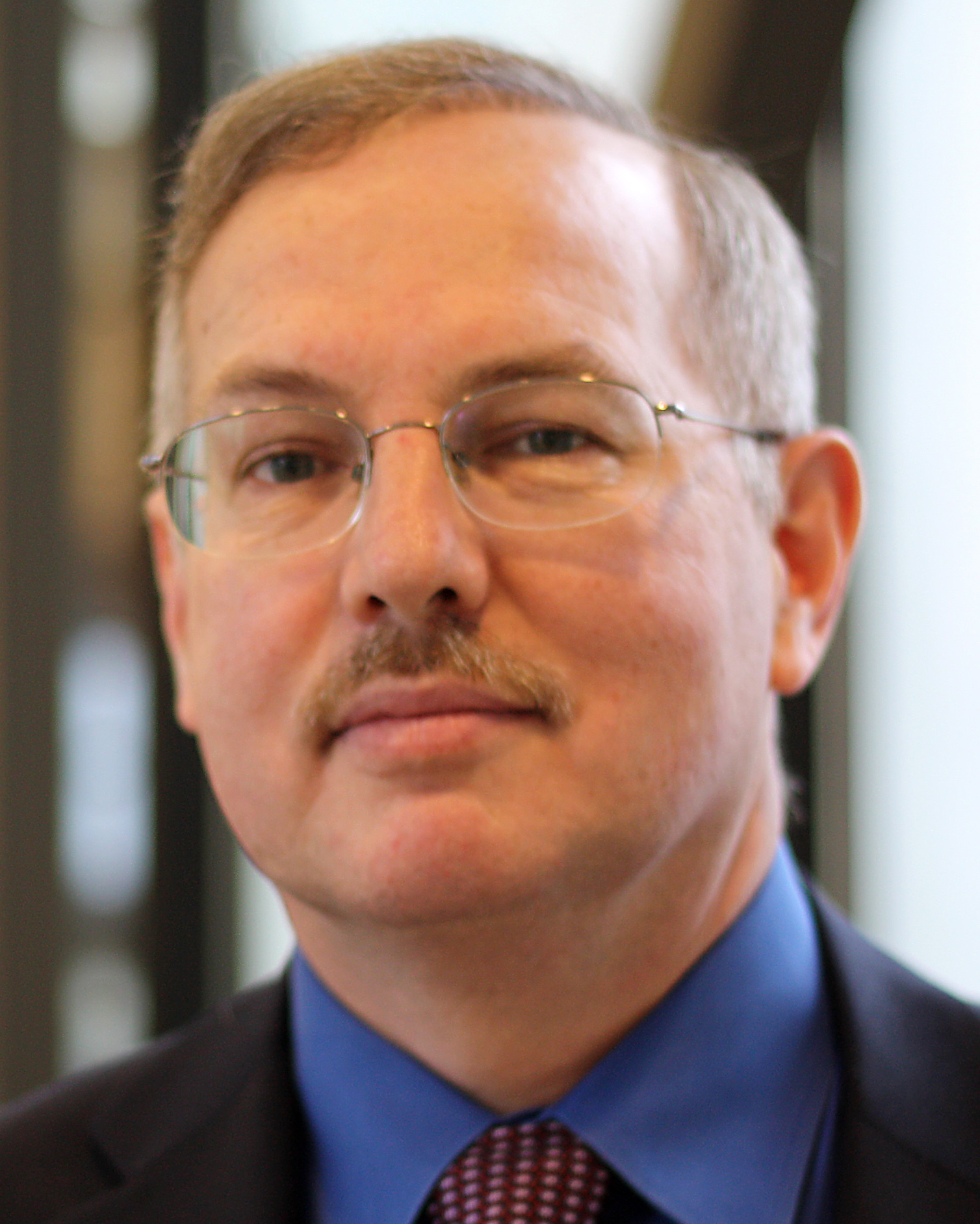

	Majority party	Minority party	Third party
Leader	Lance Pruitt (lost re-election)	Bryce Edgmon (Note: Edgmon, an independent former Democrat, was elected speaker under a Democratic-led coalition.)
Party	Republican	Democratic	Independent
Leader since	February 14, 2019	February 14, 2019
Leader's seat	27th District	37th District
Last election	23 seats	16 seats	1 seat
Seats before	23 (Note: Six Republicans joined all Democrats and independents to form a governing coalition)	15	2
Seats after	21 (Note: Four Republicans joined all Democrats and independents to form a governing coalition)	15	4
Seat change	▼2	Steady	▲2
Popular vote	149,728	100,080	45,887
Percentage	48.31%	32.29%	14.80%
Swing	▼3.29%	▼5.37%	▲6.11%
- Results: Republican hold Republican gain Democratic hold Democratic gain Independent hold Independent gain Coalition Republican hold

Speaker before election
Bryce Edgmon
Independent
Elected Speaker
Louise Stutes
Republican

The 2020 Alaska House of Representatives election was held on Tuesday, November 3, 2020, with the primary election on August 18, 2020. Voters in the 40 districts of the Alaska House of Representatives elected their representatives, in conjunction with state senate elections and the biennial United States elections for federal offices.

== Background ==
After the state House elections in 2018, Republicans gained a small majority in the chamber. When the House convened to commence its regular session in January 2019, a power struggle resulted in a lengthy delay in organizing itself. Eventually, all 15 Democratic members formed a coalition with the two independents including Bryce Edgmon (elected as a Democrat) and eight dissident Republicans to re-elect Edgmon as speaker, a total of 25 members. In May and July 2019, Republicans Gabrielle LeDoux (District 15) and Tammie Wilson (District 3) left the coalition dropping its members to 23.

== Predictions ==
Source	Ranking	As of
The Cook Political Report	Lean R (flip)	October 21, 2020

== Overview ==
2020 Alaska House of Representatives elections General election — November 3, 2020
Party	Votes	%	Candidates	Before	After	+/–
Republican	149,728	48.31%	31	23	21	▼2
Democratic	100,080	32.29%	26	15	15	Steady
Independent	45,887	14.80%	15	2	4	▲2
Write-ins	5,130	1.66%	—	—	—	—
Alaska Independence	2,002	0.65%	2	0	0	Steady
Other	1,522	0.49%	1	0	0	Steady
Libertarian	477	0.15%	1	0	0	Steady

Popular vote
Republican	48.31%
Democratic	32.29%
Independent	14.80%
Write-in	1.66%
Alaska Independence	0.65%
Others	0.64%

Seats
Republican	52.5%
Democratic	37.5%
Independent	10.0%

== Results ==
District	Incumbent	Party	Elected representative	Party
1st	Bart LeBon	Rep (Note: Part of the Majority Coalition with Democrats and Independents.)	Bart LeBon	Rep
2nd	Steve Thompson	Rep	Steve Thompson	Rep
3rd	Mike Prax	Rep	Mike Prax (Note: Unopposed in the general election.)	Rep
4th	Grier Hopkins	Dem	Grier Hopkins	Dem
5th	Adam Wool	Dem	Adam Wool	Dem
6th	Dave Talerico	Rep	Mike Cronk	Rep
7th	Colleen Sullivan-Leonard	Rep	Christopher Kurka	Rep
8th	Mark Neuman	Rep	Kevin McCabe	Rep
9th	George Rauscher	Rep	George Rauscher	Rep
10th	David Eastman	Rep	David Eastman	Rep
11th	DeLena Johnson	Rep	DeLena Johnson	Rep
12th	Cathy Tilton	Rep	Cathy Tilton	Rep
13th	Sharon Jackson	Rep	Ken McCarty	Rep
14th	Kelly Merrick	Rep	Kelly Merrick	Rep
15th	Gabrielle LeDoux	Rep (Note: Not a member of any caucus.)	David Nelson	Rep
16th	Ivy Spohnholz	Dem	Ivy Spohnholz	Dem
17th	Andy Josephson	Dem	Andy Josephson	Dem
18th	Harriet Drummond	Dem	Harriet Drummond	Dem
19th	Geran Tarr	Dem	Geran Tarr	Dem
20th	Zack Fields	Dem	Zack Fields	Dem
21st	Matt Claman	Dem	Matt Claman	Dem
22nd	Sara Rasmussen	Rep	Sara Rasmussen	Rep
23rd	Chris Tuck	Dem	Chris Tuck	Dem
24th	Chuck Kopp	Rep	Tom McKay	Rep
25th	Mel Gillis	Rep	Calvin Schrage	Ind
26th	Laddie Shaw	Rep	Laddie Shaw	Rep
27th	Lance Pruitt	Rep	Liz Snyder	Dem
28th	Jennifer Johnston	Rep	James Kaufman	Rep
29th	Ben Carpenter	Rep	Ben Carpenter	Rep
30th	Vacant (Note: Gary Knopp (Coalition Republican) died July 31, 2020.)		Ron Gillham	Rep
31st	Sarah Vance	Rep	Sarah Vance	Rep
32nd	Louise Stutes	Rep	Louise Stutes	Rep
33rd	Sara Hannan	Dem	Sara Hannan	Dem
34th	Andi Story	Dem	Andi Story	Dem
35th	Jonathan Kreiss-Tomkins	Dem	Jonathan Kreiss-Tomkins	Dem
36th	Dan Ortiz	Ind	Dan Ortiz	Ind
37th	Bryce Edgmon	Ind	Bryce Edgmon	Ind
38th	Tiffany Zulkosky	Dem	Tiffany Zulkosky	Dem
39th	Neal Foster	Dem	Neal Foster	Dem
40th	John Lincoln	Dem	Josiah Patkotak	Ind

== Close races ==
Seats where the margin of victory was under 10%:

1. District 27, 0.2% gain
2. District 15, 1.9%
3. District 40, 3.6% gain
4. District 28, 3.7%
5. District 25, 4.5% gain
6. District 23, 4.7%
7. District 5, 5.76%
8. District 4, 8.17%
9. District 31, 8.6%

== Retiring incumbents ==
Three incumbent Representatives (two Republicans and one Democrat) chose not to seek reelection.

1. Dave Talerico (R), District 6
2. Colleen Sullivan-Leonard (R), District 7
3. John Lincoln (D), District 40

== Incumbents defeated ==
=== In primary election ===
Six incumbent Representatives (all Republicans) were defeated in the August 18 primaries.

1. Sharon Jackson (R), District 13
2. Jennifer Johnston (Coalition R), District 28
3. Gary Knopp (Coalition R), District 30 (Note: Rep. Knopp died on July 30, prior to the primary, but remained on the ballot where he was defeated posthumously.)
4. Chuck Kopp (Coalition R), District 24
5. Gabrielle LeDoux (R), District 15
6. Mark Neuman (R), District 8

=== In general election ===
Two incumbents (both Republicans) sought reelection but were defeated in the general election.

1. Mel Gillis (R), District 25
2. Lance Pruitt (R), District 27

== Detailed results ==
=== District 1 ===
AD primary

Democratic and Independence primary
Party	Candidate	Votes	%
Democratic	Christopher Quist	702	50.3
Democratic	Bennie Colbert	694	49.7
Total votes		1,396	100.0

General election

2020 Alaska House of Representatives election, 1st district
Party	Candidate	Votes	%
Coalition Republican	Bart LeBon (incumbent)	3,769	55.30
Democratic	Christopher Quist	3,027	44.42
Write-in	Write-ins	19	0.28
Total votes		6,815	100.0
Republican hold			

=== District 2 ===
Republican primary

Republican primary
Party	Candidate	Votes	%
Coalition Republican	Steve Thompson (incumbent)	452	52.3
Republican	David Selle	413	47.7
Total votes		865	100.0

General election

2020 Alaska House of Representatives election, 2nd district
Party	Candidate	Votes	%
Coalition Republican	Steve Thompson (incumbent)	3,631	69.57
Democratic	Jeremiah Youmans	1,565	29.99
Write-in	Write-ins	23	0.44
Total votes		5,219	100.0
Republican hold			

=== District 3 ===
2020 Alaska House of Representatives election, 3rd district
Party	Candidate	Votes	%
Republican	Mike Prax (incumbent)	7,001	96.50
Write-in	Write-ins	254	3.50
Total votes		7,255	100.0
Republican hold			

=== District 4 ===
2020 Alaska House of Representatives election, 4th district
Party	Candidate	Votes	%
Democratic	Grier Hopkins (incumbent)	5,478	53.98
Republican	Keith Kurber	4,649	45.81
Write-in	Write-ins	21	0.21
Total votes		10,148	100.00
Democratic hold			

=== District 5 ===
AD primary

Democratic and Independence primary
Party	Candidate	Votes	%
Democratic	Adam Wool (incumbent)	1,204	64.2
Democratic	Taryn Hughes	672	35.8
Total votes		1,876	100.0

General election

2020 Alaska House of Representatives election, 5th district
Party	Candidate	Votes	%
Democratic	Adam Wool (incumbent)	4,341	52.79
Republican	Kevin McKinley	3,867	47.03
Write-in	Write-ins	15	0.18
Total votes		8,223	100.0
Democratic hold			

=== District 6 ===
Republican primary

Republican primary
Party	Candidate	Votes	%
Republican	Mike Cronk	1,337	64.9
Republican	Julie Morris	471	22.8
Republican	Ryan Smith	253	12.3
Total votes		2,061	100.0

General election

2020 Alaska House of Representatives election, 6th district
Party	Candidate	Votes	%
Republican	Mike Cronk	4,861	55.80
Democratic	Julia Hnilicka	2,626	30.15
Independent	Elijah Verhagen	644	7.39
Independent	Vernon Carlson	418	4.80
Independent	Deborah Riley	141	1.62
Write-in	Write-ins	21	0.24
Total votes		8,711	100.0
Republican hold			

=== District 7 ===
Republican primary

Republican primary
Party	Candidate	Votes	%
Republican	Christopher Kurka	1,723	69.3%
Republican	Lynn Gattis	762	30.7%
Total votes		2,485	100.00%

General election

2020 Alaska House of Representatives election, 7th district
Party	Candidate	Votes	%
Republican	Christopher Kurka	6,449	73.77
Independent	Jamin Burton	2,252	25.76
Write-in	Write-ins	41	0.47
Total votes		8,742	100.0
Republican hold			

=== District 8 ===
Republican primary

Republican primary
Party	Candidate	Votes	%
Republican	Kevin McCabe	1,798	64.3%
Republican	Mark Neuman (incumbent)	999	35.7%
Total votes		2,797	100.00%

General election

2020 Alaska House of Representatives election, 8th district
Party	Candidate	Votes	%
Republican	Kevin McCabe	7,533	81.44
Democratic	Alma Hartley	1,683	18.19
Write-in	Write-ins	34	0.37
Total votes		9,250	100.0
Republican hold			

=== District 9 ===
Republican primary

Republican primary
Party	Candidate	Votes	%
Republican	George Rauscher (incumbent)	1,689	60.9
Republican	LD Howard	1,082	39.1
Total votes		2,771	100.0

General election

2020 Alaska House of Representatives election, 9th district
Party	Candidate	Votes	%
Republican	George Rauscher (incumbent)	7,496	71.92
Democratic	Bill Johnson	2,870	27.54
Write-in	Write-ins	57	0.55
Total votes		10,423	100.0
Republican hold			

=== District 10 ===
Republican primary

Republican primary
Party	Candidate	Votes	%
Republican	David Eastman (incumbent)	1,589	52.8
Republican	Jesse Sumner	1,420	47.2
Total votes		3,009	100.0

General election

2020 Alaska House of Representatives election, 10th district
Party	Candidate	Votes	%
Republican	David Eastman (incumbent)	7,659	73.70
Democratic	Monica Stein-Olson	2,693	25.91
Write-in	Write-ins	40	0.38
Total votes		10,392	100.0
Republican hold			

=== District 11 ===
Republican primary

Republican primary
Party	Candidate	Votes	%
Republican	DeLena Johnson (incumbent)	1,858	77.2%
Republican	Alex Fetta	550	22.8%
Total votes		2,408	100.00%

General election

2020 Alaska House of Representatives election, 11th district
Party	Candidate	Votes	%
Republican	DeLena Johnson (incumbent)	7,383	74.09
Democratic	Andrea Hackbarth	2,553	25.62
Write-in	Write-ins	29	0.29
Total votes		9,965	100.0
Republican hold			

=== District 12 ===
2020 Alaska House of Representatives election, 12th district
Party	Candidate	Votes	%
Republican	Cathy Tilton (incumbent)	8,881	95.63
Write-in	Write-ins	406	4.37
Total votes		9,287	100.0
Republican hold			

=== District 13 ===
Republican primary

Republican primary
Party	Candidate	Votes	%
Republican	Ken McCarty	722	55.7
Republican	Sharon Jackson (incumbent)	573	44.3
Total votes		1,295	100.0

General election

2020 Alaska House of Representatives election, 13th district
Party	Candidate	Votes	%
Republican	Ken McCarty	4,730	67.57
Democratic	James Canitz Sr.	2,250	32.14
Write-in	Write-ins	20	0.29
Total votes		7,000	100.0
Republican hold			

=== District 14 ===
Democratic nominee Bruce Batten withdrew on August 31.

2020 Alaska House of Representatives election, 14th district
Party	Candidate	Votes	%
Republican	Kelly Merrick (incumbent)	7,602	71.77
Independent	Mike Risinger	2,960	27.95
Write-in	Write-ins	30	0.28
Total votes		10,592	100.0
Republican hold			

=== District 15 ===
Republican primary
Polling

Poll source	Date(s) administered	Sample size (Note: Key: A – all adults RV – registered voters LV – likely voters V – unclear)	Margin of error	Gabrielle LeDoux	David Nelson	Undecided
Remington Research Group/Alaska Free Market Coalition	August 11–13, 2020	121 (RV)	–	19%	49%	32%

Results

Republican primary
Party	Candidate	Votes	%
Republican	David Nelson	628	67.3
Republican	Gabrielle LeDoux (incumbent)	305	32.7
Total votes		933	100.0

AD primary

Democratic and Independence primary
Party	Candidate	Votes	%
Democratic	Lyn Franks	433	63.2
Democratic	Patrick McCormack	131	19.1
Democratic	Rick Phillips	121	17.7
Total votes		685	100.0

General election

2020 Alaska House of Representatives election, 15th district
Party	Candidate	Votes	%
Republican	David Nelson	2,541	50.82
Democratic	Lyn Franks	2,446	48.92
Write-in	Write-ins	13	0.26
Total votes		5,000	
Republican hold			

=== District 16 ===
Republican primary

Republican primary
Party	Candidate	Votes	%
Republican	Paul Bauer	667	58.3%
Republican	David Walker	477	41.7%
Total votes		1,144	100.00%

General election

2020 Alaska House of Representatives election, 16th district
Party	Candidate	Votes	%
Democratic	Ivy Spohnholz (incumbent)	4,010	53.1
Republican	Paul Bauer	3,061	40.5
Libertarian	Scott Kohlhaas	477	6.3
Write-in	Write-ins	11	0.2
Total votes		7,559	100.0
Democratic hold			

=== District 17 ===
2020 Alaska House of Representatives election, 17th district
Party	Candidate	Votes	%
Democratic	Andy Josephson (incumbent)	4,923	91.4
Write-in	Write-ins	463	8.9
Total votes		5,386	100.0
Democratic hold			

=== District 18 ===
2020 Alaska House of Representatives election, 18th district
Party	Candidate	Votes	%
Democratic	Harriet Drummond (incumbent)	5,233	90.8
Write-in	Write-ins	529	9.2
Total votes		5,762	100.0
Democratic hold			

=== District 19 ===
2020 Alaska House of Representatives election, 19th district
Party	Candidate	Votes	%
Democratic	Geran Tarr (incumbent)	3,854	92.5
Write-in	Write-ins	311	7.5
Total votes		4,165	100.0
Democratic hold			

=== District 20 ===
2020 Alaska House of Representatives election, 20th district
Party	Candidate	Votes	%
Democratic	Zack Fields (incumbent)	5,195	91.8
Write-in	Write-ins	467	8.2
Total votes		5,662	
Democratic hold			

=== District 21 ===
2020 Alaska House of Representatives election, 21st district
Party	Candidate	Votes	%
Democratic	Matt Claman (incumbent)	5,495	61.4
Republican	Lynette Largent	3,435	38.4
Write-in	Write-ins	25	0.3
Total votes		8,955	100.0
Democratic hold			

=== District 22 ===
AD primary

Democratic and Independence primary
Party	Candidate	Votes	%
Independence	David Nees	919	63.4
Independence	Dustin Darden	530	36.6
Total votes		1,449	100.0

General election

2020 Alaska House of Representatives election, 22nd district
Party	Candidate	Votes	%
Republican	Sara Rasmussen (incumbent)	4,921	54.8
Independent	Stephen Trimble	2,679	29.8
Independence	David Nees	1,356	15.1
Write-in	Write-ins	26	0.3
Total votes		8,982	100.0
Republican hold			

=== District 23 ===
AD primary

Democratic and Independence primary
Party	Candidate	Votes	%
Democratic	Chris Tuck (incumbent)	1,155	85.0%
Independence	Timothy Huit	204	15.0%
Total votes		1,359	100.00%

Republican primary

Republican primary
Party	Candidate	Votes	%
Republican	Kathy Henslee	632	50.2%
Republican	Connie Dougherty	628	49.8%
Total votes		1,260	100.00%

General election

2020 Alaska House of Representatives election, 23rd district
Party	Candidate	Votes	%
Democratic	Chris Tuck (incumbent)	3,444	47.8
Republican	Kathy Henslee	2,990	43.1
Independence	Timothy Huit	646	9.0
Write-in	Write-ins	10	0.1
Total votes		7,201	100.0
Democratic hold			

=== District 24 ===
Republican primary

Republican primary
Party	Candidate	Votes	%
Republican	Tom McKay	1,737	60.8
Coalition Republican	Chuck Kopp (incumbent)	1,121	39.2
Total votes		2,858	100.0

General election

2020 Alaska House of Representatives election, 24th district
Party	Candidate	Votes	%
Republican	Tom McKay	5,605	56.3
Democratic	Sue Levi	4,323	43.4
Write-in	Write-ins	30	0.3
Total votes		9,958	100.0
Republican hold			

=== District 25 ===
Republican primary

Republican primary
Party	Candidate	Votes	%
Republican	Mel Gillis (incumbent)	1,279	81.2
Republican	Benjamin Rodriguez	296	18.8
Total votes		1,575	100.0

AD primary

Democratic and Independence primary
Party	Candidate	Votes	%
Independent	Calvin Schrage	1,068	61.4
Democratic	Janice Park	672	38.6
Total votes		1,740	100.0

General election

2020 Alaska House of Representatives election, 25th district
Party	Candidate	Votes	%
Independent	Calvin Schrage (Note: Candidate running as an independent with the Democratic Party nomination.)	4,584	52.2
Republican	Mel Gillis (incumbent)	4,191	47.7
Write-in	Write-ins	12	0.1
Total votes		8,787	100.0
Independent gain from Republican			

=== District 26 ===
2020 Alaska House of Representatives election, 26th district
Party	Candidate	Votes	%
Republican	Laddie Shaw (incumbent)	6,934	92.8
Write-in	Write-ins	540	7.2
Total votes		7,474	100.0
Republican hold			

=== District 27 ===
2020 Alaska House of Representatives election, 27th district
Party	Candidate	Votes	%
Democratic	Liz Snyder	4,574	50.0
Republican	Lance Pruitt (incumbent)	4,563	49.8
Write-in	Write-ins	17	0.2
Total votes		9,154	100.0
Democratic gain from Republican			

=== District 28 ===
Republican primary

Republican primary
Party	Candidate	Votes	%
Republican	James Kaufman	2,443	66.3%
Coalition Republican	Jennifer Johnston (incumbent)	1,242	33.7%
Total votes		3,685	100.00%

General election
Democratic nominee Adam Lees withdrew on August 31, replaced by independent Anchorage Assemblywoman Suzanne LaFrance.

2020 Alaska House of Representatives election, 28th district
Party	Candidate	Votes	%
Republican	James Kaufman	6,143	49.8
Independent	Suzanne LaFrance	5,690	46.1
Independent	Benjamin Fletcher	493	3.9
Write-in	Write-ins	14	0.1
Total votes		12,340	100.0
Republican hold			

=== District 29 ===
2020 Alaska House of Representatives election, 29th district
Party	Candidate	Votes	%
Republican	Ben Carpenter (incumbent)	6,548	65.2
Independent	Paul Dale	3,481	34.6
Write-in	Write-ins	18	0.2
Total votes		10,047	100.0
Republican hold			

=== District 30 ===
Republican primary

Republican primary
Party	Candidate	Votes	%
Republican	Ron Gillham	1,611	59.0
Republican	Kelly Wolf	655	24.0
Coalition Republican	Gary Knopp (incumbent) (Note: Died July 30)	463	17.0
Total votes		2,729	100.0

General election

2020 Alaska House of Representatives election, 30th district
Party	Candidate	Votes	%
Republican	Ron Gillham	5,749	62.4
Independent	James Baisden	3,327	36.1
Write-in	Write-ins	139	1.5
Total votes		9,215	100.0
Republican hold			

=== District 31 ===
2020 Alaska House of Representatives election, 31st district
Party	Candidate	Votes	%
Republican	Sarah Vance (incumbent)	6,468	54.2
Independent	Kelly Cooper	5,434	45.6
Write-in	Write-ins	23	0.2
Total votes		11,925	100.0
Republican hold			

=== District 32 ===
2020 Alaska House of Representatives election, 32nd district
Party	Candidate	Votes	%
Coalition Republican	Louise Stutes (incumbent)	6,663	96.0
Write-in	Write-ins	280	4.0
Total votes		6,943	100.0
Republican hold			

=== District 33 ===
2020 Alaska House of Representatives election, 33rd district
Party	Candidate	Votes	%
Democratic	Sara Hannan (incumbent)	8,403	94.8
Write-in	Write-ins	463	5.2
Total votes		8,866	100.0
Democratic hold			

=== District 34 ===
2020 Alaska House of Representatives election, 34th district
Party	Candidate	Votes	%
Democratic	Andi Story (incumbent)	6,284	62.0
Independent	Edward King	3,805	37.5
Write-in	Write-ins	48	0.5
Total votes		10,137	100.0
Democratic hold			

=== District 35 ===
Republican primary

Republican primary
Party	Candidate	Votes	%
Republican	Kenny Skaflestad	592	53.4%
Republican	Arthur Martin	517	46.6%
Total votes		1,109	100.00%

General election

2020 Alaska House of Representatives election, 35th district
Party	Candidate	Votes	%
Democratic	Jonathan Kreiss-Tomkins (incumbent)	5,677	58.7
Republican	Kenny Skaflestad	3,971	41.0
Write-in	Write-ins	32	0.3
Total votes		9,680	100.0
Democratic hold			

=== District 36 ===
2020 Alaska House of Representatives election, 36th district
Party	Candidate	Votes	%
Independent	Dan Ortiz (incumbent)	5,409	60.3
Republican	Leslie Becker	3,514	39.2
Write-in	Write-ins	47	0.5
Total votes		8,970	100.0
Independent hold			

=== District 37 ===
2020 Alaska House of Representatives election, 37th district
Party	Candidate	Votes	%
Independent	Bryce Edgmon (incumbent)	2,538	95.7
Write-in	Write-ins	114	4.3
Total votes		2,652	100.0
Independent hold			

=== District 38 ===
2020 Alaska House of Representatives election, 38th district
Party	Candidate	Votes	%
Democratic	Tiffany Zulkosky (incumbent)	2,232	59.1
Veteran's Party	Willy Keppel	1,522	40.3
Write-in	Write-ins	24	0.6
Total votes		3,778	100.0
Democratic hold			

=== District 39 ===
AD primary

Democratic and Independence primary
Party	Candidate	Votes	%
Democratic	Neal Foster (incumbent)	1,063	52.4
Democratic	Tyler Ivanoff	966	47.6
Total votes		2,029	100.0

General election

2020 Alaska House of Representatives election, 39th district
Party	Candidate	Votes	%
Democratic	Neal Foster (incumbent)	3,038	63.2
Write-in	Write-ins	913	19.0
Republican	Dan Holmes	855	17.8
Total votes		4,806	100.0
Democratic hold			

=== District 40 ===
2020 Alaska House of Representatives election, 40th district
Party	Candidate	Votes	%
Independent	Josiah "Aullaqsruaq" Patkotak	2,011	51.7
Democratic	Elizabeth Ferguson	1,863	47.9
Write-in	Write-ins	14	0.4
Total votes		3,888	100.0
Independent gain from Democratic			

== See also ==
- 2020 Alaska elections
