= Alaska Senate district L =

Alaskan legislative district

Alaska's L State Senate district
Senator
Kelly Merrick; R–Eagle River
since 2023
- Population: 36,237

Alaska Senate district L is one of 20 districts of the Alaska Senate. It has been represented by Republican Kelly Merrick since 2023. District L is located in Anchorage and encompasses the entirety of Alaska's 23rd House of Representatives district and 24th House of Representatives district, including Chugiak and Eagle River.

== Election results (2022 boundaries) ==
=== 2024 ===
Nonpartisan primary
Party	Candidate	Votes	%
Coalition Republican	Kelly Merrick (incumbent)	2,332	33.9
Republican	Jared Goecker	2,247	32.7
Democratic	Lee Hammermeister	1,003	14.6
Republican	Ken McCarty (withdrew)	779	11.3
Republican	Sharon Jackson (withdrew)	513	7.5
Total votes		6,874	100.0

After the primary, McCarty withdrew from the race and endorsed Goecker. This would normally mean that Jackson, the fifth-place finisher, would move up, but she also withdrew and endorsed Goecker.

General election
Party	Candidate	First choice			Round 1			Round 2	
Party	Candidate	Votes	%	Transfer	Votes	%	Transfer	Votes	%
Coalition Republican	Kelly Merrick	9,050	46.32%	+42	9,092	46.48%	+800	9,892	55.48%
Republican	Jared Goecker	7,685	39.33%	+13	7,698	39.36%	+241	7,939	44.52%
Democratic	Lee Hammermeister	2,754	14.09%	+16	2,770	14.16%	-2,770	Eliminated	
Write-in		51	0.26%	-51	Eliminated				
Total votes		19,540			19,560			17,831	
Blank or inactive ballots					780		+1,729	2,509	
Republican hold									
Coalition hold									

=== 2022 ===
Nonpartisan primary
Party	Candidate	Votes	%
Republican	Kelly Merrick	5,324	53.1
Republican	Ken McCarty	2,872	28.7
Republican	Joe Wright (withdrew)	1,132	11.3
Republican	Clayton Trotter (withdrew)	691	6.9
Total votes		10,019	100.00

General election
Party	Candidate	Votes	%
Republican	Kelly Merrick	8,497	57.9
Republican	Ken McCarty	6,024	41.0
Write-in	Write-ins	156	1.1
Total votes		14,677	100.0
Republican hold			

== Election results (2013 boundaries) ==
Map of District L of the Alaska Senate from 2013 to 2022

=== 2020 ===
Republican primary
Party	Candidate	Votes	%
Republican	Natasha von Imhof (incumbent)	2,162	53.5
Republican	Stephen Duplantis	1,882	46.5
Total votes		4,044	100.0

Democratic primary
Party	Candidate	Votes	%
Democratic	Roselynn Cacy	2,856	100.0
Total votes		2,856	100.0

General election
Party	Candidate	Votes	%
Republican	Natasha von Imhof (incumbent)	10,203	59.7
Democratic	Roselynn Cacy	6,706	39.3
Write-in	Write-ins	169	1.0
Total votes		17,078	100.0
Republican hold			

=== 2016 ===
Republican primary
Party	Candidate	Votes	%
Republican	Natasha von Imhof	1,671	47.32
Republican	Craig Johnson	1,066	30.19
Republican	Jeff Landfield	794	22.49
Total votes		3,531	100

Democratic primary
Party	Candidate	Votes	%
Democratic	Forrest J. McDonald	930	63.39
Democratic	Roselynn Cacy	537	36.61
Total votes		1,467	100

General election
Party	Candidate	Votes	%
Republican	Natasha von Imhof	7,645	51.81
Democratic	Forrest J. McDonald	5,971	40.46
Independent	Tom Johnson	1,088	7.37
Write-ins	Write-ins	53	0.36
Total votes		14,757	100
Republican hold			

== Election results (2012 boundaries) ==
Map of District L of the Alaska Senate from 2012 to 2013

=== 2012 ===
Republican primary
Party	Candidate	Votes	%
Republican	Kevin Meyer (incumbent)	3,110	100.0
Total votes		3,110	100

Democratic primary
Party	Candidate	Votes	%
Democratic	Jacob Hale	1,506	100.0
Total votes		1,506	100

General election
Party	Candidate	Votes	%
Republican	Kevin Meyer (incumbent)	10,304	72.41
Democratic	Jacob Hale	3,894	27.36
Write-ins	Write-ins	32	0.22
Total votes		14,230	100
Republican hold			
