= 2024 Alaska Senate election =

2024 Alaska Senate elections
- November 5, 2024

10 of 20 seats in the Alaska Senate 11 seats needed for a majority
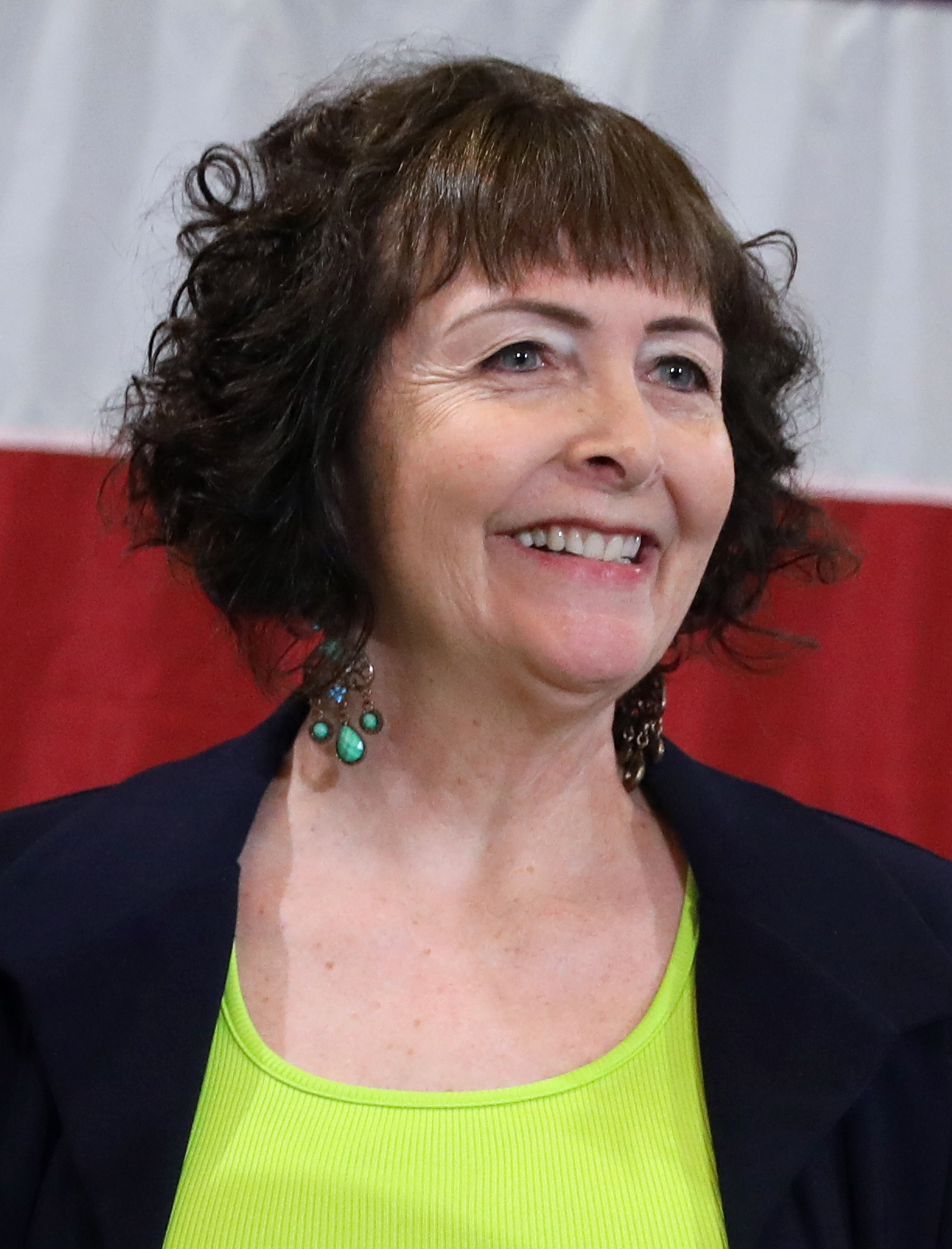

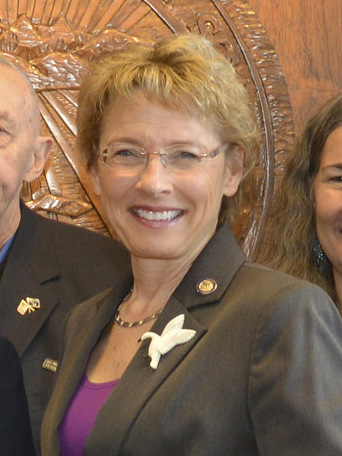

	Majority party	Minority party	Third party
Leader	Shelley Hughes	Cathy Giessel (Note: Giessel, a Republican, was selected as majority leader under a Democratic-led coalition)	—
Party	Republican	Democratic	Independent
Leader since	January 19, 2021	January 17, 2023	—
Leader's seat	M–Palmer	E–Anchorage	—
Last election	11 seats, 63.76%	8 seats, 27.55%	0 seats, 3.61%
Seats before	11	9 (Note: All Democrats and eight Republicans formed a governing coalition)	0
Seats won	5	5	0
Seats after	11	9	0
Seat change	Steady	Steady	Steady
Popular vote	82,669	52,654	10,531
Percentage	55.79%	35.53%	7.11%
- Democratic coalition hold Republican coalition hold Minority Republican caucus gain No election
Senate President before election
Gary Stevens
Republican (coalition)
Elected Senate President
Gary Stevens
Republican (coalition)

The 2024 Alaska Senate elections took place on November 5, 2024, with the primary elections being held on August 20, 2024. State senators serve four-year terms in the Alaska State Senate, with half of the seats up for election every two years. Senators are elected by instant-runoff voting.

== Background ==
Republicans maintained control of the state senate from the 2012 election until the 2022 midterms, after which a coalition government between 8 of the 11 Republicans and all 9 Democrats was formed. The 3 remaining Republicans did not join the coalition; none of their seats are up for election. Some majority-coalition Republicans faced conservative opponents who vowed not to join the caucus, such as Jesse Bjorkman and Kelly Merrick, who face challenges from State Representatives Ben Carpenter and Ken McCarty respectively. David Wilson also faces a conservative challenger in Mat-Su Assemblymember Robert Yundt for joining the majority caucus.

Bjorkman and Merrick ultimately prevailed after ranked-choice votes were tabulated, while Yundt defeated Wilson outright. In the open R District held by coalition Republican Click Bishop, non-coalition Republican state representative Mike Cronk won. The bipartisan coalition thus lost two seats but held its supermajority.

== Predictions ==
Source	Ranking	As of
Sabato's Crystal Ball	Lean Coal.	October 23, 2024

== Overview ==
=== Primary elections ===
2024 Alaska Senate election Primary election – August 20, 2024
Party	Votes	%	Candidates	Advancing to general	Seats contesting
Republican	26,810	51.06	16	12	7
Democratic	20,988	39.97	8	8	8
Undeclared	4,056	7.72	2	2	2
Independence	653	1.24	2	1	1
Totals	52,507	100.00	28	23	—

=== General election ===
2024 Alaska Senate elections General election – November 5, 2024
Party	Round 1		Max Round		Candidates	Before	After	±
Party	Votes	%	Votes	%	Candidates	Before	After	±
Republican	81,386	53.59%	82,669	55.79%	12	11	11	Steady
Democratic	57,492	37.86%	52,654	35.53%	8	9	9	Steady
Undeclared	10,531	6.93%	10,531	7.11%	2	0	0	Steady
Independence	1,157	0.76%	1,157	0.78%	1	0	0	Steady
Write-ins	1,302	0.86%	1,169	0.79%	—	0	0	Steady
Totals	151,868	100.00%	148,180	100.00%	23	20	20	—

Party	Leader	Before	After	Change
Democratic	Gary Stevens	9	9	Steady
Republican	Gary Stevens	8	5	Steady
Republican	Shelley Hughes	3	6	Steady
Total		20	20	Steady

== Summary of results ==
District	Incumbent	Party	Elected Senator	Party
B	Jesse Kiehl	Dem	Jesse Kiehl	Dem
D	Jesse Bjorkman	Rep	Jesse Bjorkman	Rep
F	James D. Kaufman	Rep	James D. Kaufman (Note: After the election Sen. Kaufman left the majority coalition to caucus with the minority Republicans.)	Rep
H	Matt Claman	Dem	Matt Claman	Dem
J	Forrest Dunbar	Dem	Forrest Dunbar	Dem
L	Kelly Merrick	Rep	Kelly Merrick	Rep
N	David Wilson	Rep	Robert Yundt	Rep
P	Scott Kawasaki	Dem	Scott Kawasaki	Dem
R	Click Bishop†	Rep	Mike Cronk	Rep
T	Donny Olson	Dem	Donny Olson	Dem

== Retirements ==
1. R District: Click Bishop is retiring.

== Detailed results ==
- Source for general election first-choice votes
- Source for primary results
- Certified candidate list

=== District B ===
Nonpartisan primary
Party	Candidate	Votes	%
Democratic	Jesse Kiehl (incumbent)	6,256	100.0
Total votes		6,256	100.0

General election
Party	Candidate	Votes	%
Democratic	Jesse Kiehl (incumbent)	15,508	96.51
Write-in		561	3.49
Total votes		16,069	100.0
Democratic hold			
Coalition hold			

=== District D ===
Nonpartisan primary
Party	Candidate	Votes	%
Coalition Republican	Jesse Bjorkman (incumbent)	2,924	44.3
Republican	Ben Carpenter	2,660	40.3
Democratic	Tina Wegener	845	12.8
Independence	Andy Cizek (withdrew)	172	2.6
Total votes		6,601	100.0

General election
Party	Candidate	First choice			Round 1			Round 2	
Party	Candidate	Votes	%	Transfer	Votes	%	Transfer	Votes	%
Coalition Republican	Jesse Bjorkman	9,234	47.82%	+23	9,257	47.92%	+545	9,802	54.71%
Republican	Ben Carpenter	7,848	40.64%	+17	7,865	40.71%	+249	8,114	45.29%
Democratic	Tina Wegener	2,182	11.3%	+14	2,196	11.37%	-2,196	Eliminated	
Write-in		47	0.24%	-47	Eliminated				
Total votes		19,311			19,318			17,916	
Blank or inactive ballots					820		+1,402	2,222	
Republican hold									
Coalition hold									

=== District F ===
Nonpartisan primary
Party	Candidate	Votes	%
Democratic	Janice Park	2,737	48.8
Coalition Republican	James D. Kaufman (incumbent)	2,563	45.7
Republican	Harold Borbridge	307	5.5
Total votes		5,607	100.0

General election
Party	Candidate	First choice			Round 1			Round 2	
Party	Candidate	Votes	%	Transfer	Votes	%	Transfer	Votes	%
Coalition Republican	James D. Kaufman	8,147	47.9%	+33	8,180	48.1%	+498	8,678	52.8%
Democratic	Janice Park	7,646	45.0%	+11	7,657	45.0%	+87	7,744	47.2%
Republican	Harold Borbridge	1,178	6.9%	+6	1,184	7.0%	-	Eliminated	
Write-in		35	0.21%	-	Eliminated				
Total votes		17,006			17,021			16,422	
Blank or inactive ballots					946		+599	1,545	
Republican hold									
Coalition hold									

=== District H ===
Nonpartisan primary
Party	Candidate	Votes	%
Democratic	Matt Claman (incumbent)	4,036	60.1
Republican	Thomas McKay (withdrew)	1,393	20.7
Republican	Liz Vazquez	1,287	19.2
Total votes		6,716	100.0

General election
Party	Candidate	Votes	%
Democratic	Matt Claman (incumbent)	9,924	55.24
Republican	Liz Vazquez	7,989	44.47
Write-in		53	0.3
Total votes		17,966	100.0
Democratic hold			
Coalition hold			

=== District J ===
Nonpartisan primary
Party	Candidate	Votes	%
Democratic	Forrest Dunbar (incumbent)	2,253	72.3
Independent	Cheronda Smith (Note: Listed on the ballot as "Undeclared")	863	27.7
Total votes		3,116	100.0

General election
Party	Candidate	Votes	%
Democratic	Forrest Dunbar (incumbent)	7,292	69.83
Independent	Cheronda Smith	3,022	28.94
Write-in		129	1.24
Total votes		10,443	100.0
Democratic hold			
Coalition hold			

=== District L ===
Nonpartisan primary
Party	Candidate	Votes	%
Coalition Republican	Kelly Merrick (incumbent)	2,332	33.9
Republican	Jared Goecker	2,247	32.7
Democratic	Lee Hammermeister	1,003	14.6
Republican	Ken McCarty (withdrew)	779	11.3
Republican	Sharon Jackson (withdrew)	513	7.5
Total votes		6,874	100.0

After the primary, McCarty withdrew from the race and endorsed Goecker. This would normally mean that Jackson, the fifth place finisher, would move up, but she also withdrew and endorsed Goecker.

General election
Party	Candidate	First choice			Round 1			Round 2	
Party	Candidate	Votes	%	Transfer	Votes	%	Transfer	Votes	%
Coalition Republican	Kelly Merrick	9,050	46.3%	+42	9,092	46.5%	+800	9,892	55.5%
Republican	Jared Goecker	7,685	39.3%	+13	7,698	39.4%	+241	7,939	44.5%
Democratic	Lee Hammermeister	2,754	14.1%	+16	2,770	14.2%	-2,770	Eliminated	
Write-in		51	0.3%	-51	Eliminated				
Total votes		19,540			19,560			17,831	
Blank or inactive ballots					780		+1,729	2,509	
Republican hold									
Coalition hold									

=== District N ===
Nonpartisan primary
Party	Candidate	Votes	%
Coalition Republican	David Wilson (incumbent)	1,724	41.4
Republican	Robert Yundt	1,360	32.7
Republican	Stephen Wright	1,080	25.9
Total votes		4,164	100.0

General election
Party	Candidate	Votes	%
Republican	Robert Yundt	8,163	52.69
Coalition Republican	David S. Wilson (incumbent)	4,525	29.21
Republican	Stephen Wright	2,619	16.9
Write-in		186	1.2
Total votes		15,493	100.0
Republican hold			
Minority Caucus gain from Coalition			

=== District P ===
Nonpartisan primary
Party	Candidate	Votes	%
Republican	Leslie Hajdukovich	1,764	51.35
Democratic	Scott Kawasaki (incumbent)	1,671	48.65
Total votes		3,435	100.0

General election
Party	Candidate	Votes	%
Democratic	Scott Kawasaki (incumbent)	5,913	51.39
Republican	Leslie Hajdukovich	5,561	48.33
Write-in		32	0.28
Total votes		11,506	100.0
Democratic hold			
Coalition hold			

=== District R ===
Nonpartisan primary
Party	Candidate	Votes	%
Republican	Mike Cronk	3,305	43.8
Independent	Savannah Fletcher	3,193	42.3
Republican	James Squyres (withdrew)	572	7.6
Independence	Robert Williams	481	6.4
Total votes		7,551	100.0

General election
Party	Candidate	Votes	%
Republican	Mike Cronk	9,387	51.84
Independent	Savannah Fletcher	7,509	41.47
Independence	Robert Williams	1,157	6.39
Write-in		56	0.31
Total votes		18,109	100.0
Republican hold			
Minority Caucus gain from Coalition			

=== District T ===
Nonpartisan primary
Party	Candidate	Votes	%
Democratic	Donny Olson (incumbent)	2,187	100

General election
Party	Candidate	Votes	%
Democratic	Donny Olson (incumbent)	6,273	97.63
Write-in		152	2.37
Total votes		6,425	100.0
Democratic hold			
Coalition hold			

== See also ==
- List of Alaska State Legislatures
