= Alaska Senate district N =

Alaskan legislative district

Alaska's N State Senate district
Senator
David S. Wilson; R–Wasilla
since 2023
- Population: 37,592

Alaska Senate district N is one of 20 districts of the Alaska Senate. It has been represented by Republican David S. Wilson since 2023. Wilson previously represented District D from 2017−2023. District N is located in the Mat-Su Valley and encompasses the entirety of Alaska's 27th House of Representatives district and 28th House of Representatives district, including Wasilla, Meadow Lakes, Tanaina, and Lakes.

== Election results (2022 boundaries) ==
=== 2024 ===
Nonpartisan primary
Party	Candidate	Votes	%
Coalition Republican	David Wilson (incumbent)	1,724	41.4
Republican	Robert Yundt	1,360	32.7
Republican	Stephen Wright	1,080	25.9
Total votes		4,164	100.0

General election
Party	Candidate	Votes	%
Republican	Robert Yundt	8,163	52.69
Coalition Republican	David S. Wilson (incumbent)	4,525	29.21
Republican	Stephen Wright	2,619	16.9
Write-in		186	1.2
Total votes		15,493	100.0
Republican hold			
Minority Caucus gain from Coalition			

=== 2022 ===
Nonpartisan primary
Party	Candidate	Votes	%
Republican	David Wilson (incumbent)	3,585	46.4
Republican	Steven Wright	2,123	27.5
Republican	Scott Clayton	2,025	26.2
Total votes		7,733	100.00

General election
Party	Candidate	First choice			Round 1			Round 2	
Party	Candidate	Votes	%	Transfer	Votes	%	Transfer	Votes	%
Republican	David Wilson (incumbent)	5,133	44.46	+37	5,170	44.83	+954	6,124	58.69
Republican	Steven Wright	3,347	28.99	+38	3,385	29.35	+926	4,311	41.31
Republican	Scott Clayton	2,923	25.32	+54	2,977	25.82	-2,977	Eliminated	
Write-in		141	1.22	-141	Eliminated				
Total votes		11,544			11,532			10,435	
Blank or inactive ballots					2,244		+1,097	3,341	
Republican hold									

== Election results (2013 boundaries) ==
Map of District N of the Alaska Senate from 2013 to 2022

=== 2020 ===
Republican primary
Party	Candidate	Votes	%
Republican	Roger Holland	3,686	64.2
Republican	Cathy Giessel (incumbent)	2,055	35.8
Total votes		5,741	100.0

Democratic primary
Party	Candidate	Votes	%
Democratic	Carl Johnson	2,247	54.1
Democratic	Lynette Moreno Hinz	1,907	45.9
Total votes		4,154	100.0

General election
Party	Candidate	Votes	%
Republican	Roger Holland	10,501	49.7
Democratic	Carl Johnson	9,648	45.6
Independent	Carolyn "Care" Clift	959	4.5
Write-in	Write-ins	40	0.2
Total votes		21,148	100.0
Republican hold			

=== 2016 ===
Republican primary
Party	Candidate	Votes	%
Republican	Cathy Giessel (incumbent)	3,649	100.0
Total votes		3,649	100

General election
Party	Candidate	Votes	%
Republican	Cathy Giessel (incumbent)	9,570	51.90
Independent	Vince Beltrami	8,772	47.57
Write-ins	Write-ins	98	0.53
Total votes		18,440	100
Republican hold			

=== 2014 ===
Republican primary
Party	Candidate	Votes	%
Republican	Cathy Giessel (incumbent)	6,904	100.0
Total votes		6,904	100

Democratic primary
Party	Candidate	Votes	%
Democratic	Harry Crawford	3,982	100.0
Total votes		3,982	100

General election
Party	Candidate	Votes	%
Republican	Cathy Giessel (incumbent)	9,657	54.70
Democratic	Harry Crawford	7,938	44.97
Write-ins	Write-ins	58	0.33
Total votes		17,653	100
Republican hold			

== Election results (2012 boundaries) ==
Map of District N of the Alaska Senate from 2012 to 2013

=== 2012 ===
Republican primary
Party	Candidate	Votes	%
Republican	Cathy Giessel (incumbent)	3,964	67.85
Republican	Joe Arness	1,878	32.15
Total votes		5,842	100

General election
Party	Candidate	Votes	%
Republican	Cathy Giessel (incumbent)	10,405	58.80
Independent	Ron Devon	7,202	40.70
Write-ins	Write-ins	88	0.50
Total votes		17,695	100
Republican hold			
