= Alaska Senate district F =

Alaskan legislative district

Alaska's F State Senate district
Senator
James D. Kaufman; R–Anchorage
since 2023
- Population: 36,320

Alaska Senate district F is one of twenty districts of the Alaska Senate. It has been represented by Republican James D. Kaufman since 2023. District F is located in Anchorage and encompasses the entirety of Alaska's 11th House of Representatives district and 12th House of Representatives district, including Far North Bicentennial Park.

== Election results (2022 boundaries) ==
=== 2024 ===
Nonpartisan primary
Party	Candidate	Votes	%
Democratic	Janice Park	2,737	48.8
Coalition Republican	James D. Kaufman (incumbent)	2,563	45.7
Republican	Harold Borbridge	307	5.5
Total votes		5,607	100.0

General election
Party	Candidate	First choice			Round 1			Round 2	
Party	Candidate	Votes	%	Transfer	Votes	%	Transfer	Votes	%
Coalition Republican	James D. Kaufman	8,147	47.91%	+33	8,180	48.06%	+498	8,678	52.84%
Democratic	Janice Park	7,646	44.96%	+11	7,657	44.99%	+87	7,744	47.16%
Republican	Harold Borbridge	1,178	6.93%	+6	1,184	6.96%	-	Eliminated	
Write-in		35	0.21%	-	Eliminated				
Total votes		17,006			17,021			16,422	
Blank or inactive ballots					946		+599	1,545	
Republican hold									
Coalition hold									

=== 2022 ===
Nonpartisan primary
Party	Candidate	Votes	%
Republican	James D. Kaufman	5,453	54.2
Democratic	Janice Park	4,612	45.8
Total votes		10,065	100.00

General election
Party	Candidate	Votes	%
Republican	James D. Kaufman	7,795	54.5
Democratic	Janice Park	6,476	45.3
Write-in	Write-ins	29	0.2
Total votes		14,300	100.0
Republican hold			

== Election results (2013 boundaries) ==
Map of District F of the Alaska Senate from 2013 to 2022

=== 2020 ===
Republican primary
Party	Candidate	Votes	%
Republican	Shelley Hughes (incumbent)	4,759	100.0
Total votes		4,759	100.0

Democratic primary
Party	Candidate	Votes	%
Independent	Stephany Jeffers	1,992	100.0
Total votes		1,992	100.0

Jeffers withdrew prior to the general election, and was replaced by Jim Cooper.

General election
Party	Candidate	Votes	%
Republican	Shelley Hughes (incumbent)	14,751	71.3
Democratic	Jim Cooper	4,904	23.7
Libertarian	Gavin Christiansen	998	4.8
Write-in	Write-ins	29	0.1
Total votes		20,682	100.0
Republican hold			

=== 2016 ===
Republican primary
Party	Candidate	Votes	%
Republican	Shelley Hughes	2,186	48.09
Republican	Adam Crum	1,885	41.47
Republican	Steve St. Clair	475	10.45
Total votes		4,546	100

Democratic primary
Party	Candidate	Votes	%
Democratic	Sam Laudert-Rodgers	849	100.0
Total votes		849	100

Laudert-Rodgers withdrew prior to the general election.

General election
Party	Candidate	Votes	%
Republican	Shelley Hughes	12,284	71.73
Independent	Tim Hale	4,750	27.74
Write-ins	Write-ins	92	0.54
Total votes		17,126	100
Republican hold			

=== 2014 ===
Republican primary
Party	Candidate	Votes	%
Republican	Bill Stoltze	5,529	71.22
Republican	DeLena Johnson	2,234	28.78
Total votes		7,763	100

Democratic primary
Party	Candidate	Votes	%
Democratic	Patricia Chesbro	2,148	100.0
Total votes		2,148	100

General election
Party	Candidate	Votes	%
Republican	Bill Stoltze	11,338	73.08
Democratic	Patricia R. Chesbro	4,117	26.54
Write-ins	Write-ins	59	0.38
Total votes		15,514	100
Republican hold			

== Election results (2012 boundaries) ==
Map of District F of the Alaska Senate from 2012 to 2013

=== 2012 ===
Republican primary
Party	Candidate	Votes	%
Republican	Fred Dyson (incumbent)	3,352	100.0
Total votes		3,352	100

Democratic primary
Party	Candidate	Votes	%
Democratic	Martin Lindeke	859	100.0
Total votes		859	100

General election
Party	Candidate	Votes	%
Republican	Fred Dyson (incumbent)	9,954	75.15
Democratic	Martin Lindeke	3,238	24.45
Write-ins	Write-ins	53	0.40
Total votes		13,245	100
Republican hold			
