= Senator Huggins =

Senator Huggins may refer to:

- Charlie Huggins (born 1947), Alaska State Senate
- Waymond C. Huggins (1927–2016), Georgia State Senate
