= James Kaufman =

James Kaufman may refer to:

- James C. Kaufman, American psychologist
- James D. Kaufman, American politician
