= Lance Pruitt =

American politician

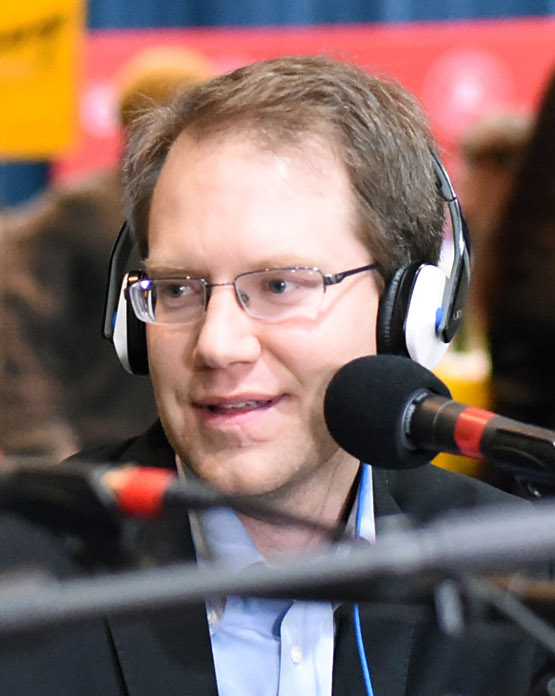

Minority Leader of the Alaska House of Representatives
- In office February 14, 2019 – January 18, 2021
- Preceded by: Charisse Millett
- Succeeded by: Cathy Tilton

Member of the Alaska House of Representatives from the 27th district
- In office January 18, 2011 – January 18, 2021
- Preceded by: Harry Crawford
- Succeeded by: Liz Snyder

Personal details
- Born: Lance David Pruitt; August 18, 1981 (age 44) Anchorage, Alaska, U.S.
- Party: Republican
- Spouse: Mary Spinella
- Children: 2
- Education: University of Alaska, Anchorage (BA); Kaplan University (MBA)
- Website: Official website

Lance David Pruitt (born August 18, 1981) was a Republican member of the Alaska House of Representatives from the 27th district which covers East Anchorage. He was elected in 2010 and left office in 2021 following his election loss in 2020.

== Early life and career ==
Born and raised in Anchorage, Pruitt graduated from Heritage High School in 1999, thereafter spending the next four years at the University of Alaska Anchorage gaining a BA in History. Afterwards Pruitt began work in logistical management, including becoming Service Manager at FedEx Ground, and alongside his work as a state representative Pruitt is now also General Manager of Sears Logistics and the owner of small business Good 4 You Vending. Furthering his study, he attended Kaplan University from 2007 to 2009 and graduated with an MBA in administration. He has also been a NANA slope worker and a member of the Alaska Chamber of Commerce.

== Politics ==
Pruitt ran for the state house's 21st district being vacated by Democrat Harry Crawford. Running unopposed, Pruitt gained the Republican nomination in August 2010. In the November election, he defeated Democratic nominee Barbara Norton 54% to 43%. (The Libertarian nominee and write-ins received the remainder of the vote.)

After being elected, Pruitt became co-chair of the house's Energy Special Committee; he also served as vice-chair of the education and transportation committees and as a member of the Legislative Outdoor Heritage Caucus. In the 2011 mid-term Alaska Business Report Card—a grading system run by several Alaska business coalitions judging state officials on how favorable they are to the business community—Pruitt received an A.

In his first term, Pruitt was the youngest member of the House. He was also the first person under age 30 to serve in the Alaska Legislature since Mary Kapsner reached her 30th birthday while in office in 2003. In 2014 he was named an Aspen Institute Rodel Fellow. As House Minority Leader, Pruitt spearheaded the removal of David Eastman from his committee positions due to Republican infighting.

Pruitt ran for reelection in 2020 and lost to Democratic challenger Liz Snyder by 13 votes. The Alaska Supreme Court struck down his challenges to the result.

In 2021, the Alaska Public Offices Commission levied a $20,000 fine against Pruitt for campaign finance violations committed from 2016 to 2020.

== Personal life ==
Pruitt is married to Mary Ann and has two children and currently resides in East Anchorage. He is a member of the National Rifle Association of America, which also endorsed his run for the house. Alongside his activities Pruitt has also been a soccer coach, and helped for both the Alaska Airmen's Association and the Resource Development Council.

Alaska House of Representatives
Preceded by Charisse Millett	Minority Leader of the Alaska House of Representatives; 2019–2021	Succeeded by Cathy Tilton
