= 2009 Anchorage mayoral election =

- April 7, 2009 (first round); May 5, 2009 (runoff)
- Turnout: 29.67% (first round); 22.35% (runoff)
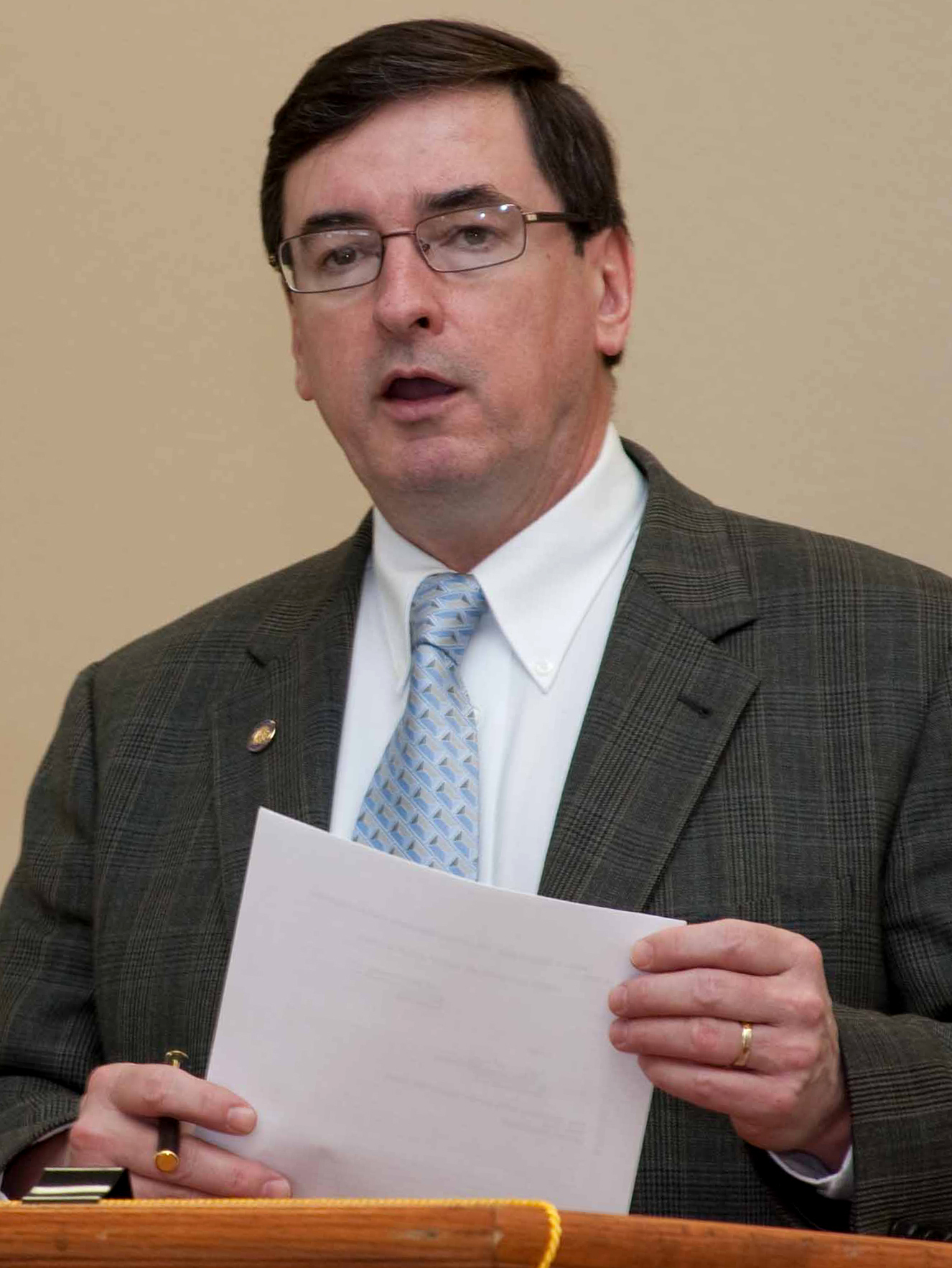

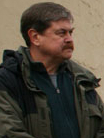

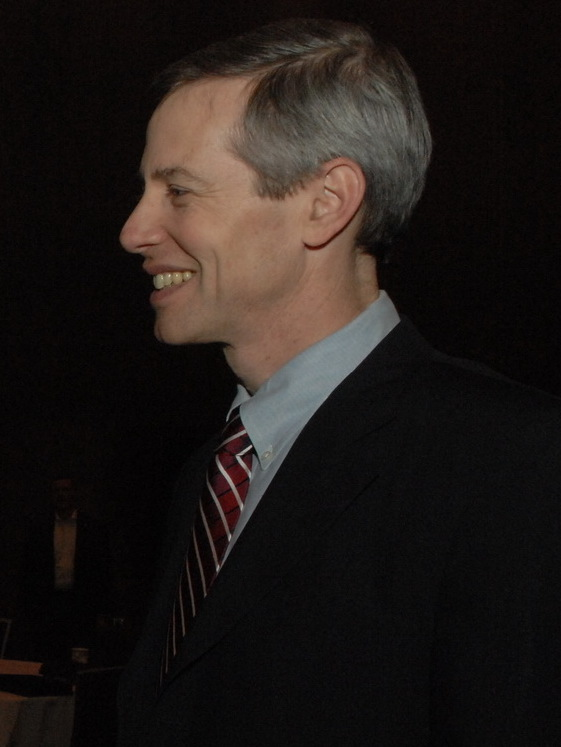
Candidate	Dan Sullivan	Eric Croft	Sheila Selkregg
First-round vote	25,262	11,432	9,473
First-round percentage	43.38%	19.63%	16.27%
Second-round vote	31,194	28,812
Second-round percentage	56.71%	43.29%
Candidate	Walt Monegan	Matt Claman
First-round vote	5,063	3,325
First-round percentage	8.69%	5.71%
Runoff results by precinct:
Sullivan:
50–60%
60–70%
70–80%
Tie:
50–60%
Croft:
50–60%
60–70%
70–80%
>90%
Mayor before election
Matt Claman (acting)
Democratic
Elected mayor
Dan Sullivan
Republican

The 2009 Anchorage mayoral election was held on April 7 and May 5, 2009, to elect the mayor of Anchorage, Alaska. Incumbent Mayor Mark Begich had been elected Alaska's junior U.S. Senator in November 2008. Since no candidate reached a 45% plurality needed to win outright, the top-two candidates advanced to a runoff. Fifteen candidates competed, with former State Rep. Eric Croft and former Anchorage Assemblyman Dan Sullivan proceeding to the runoff election, which Sullivan won with 57% of the vote.

== Candidates ==
- Matt Claman - former Anchorage Assembly chairman, acting Mayor since January 2009
- Eric Croft - former Democratic State Representative and 2006 gubernatorial candidate
- Merica Hlatcu
- Paul Honeman
- Phil Isley
- Paul Kendall
- Jacob Seth Kern
- Dominic Lee
- Bob Lupo
- Walt Monegan - former Anchorage police chief and former Public Safety Commissioner
- Billy Ray Powers
- Sheila Selkregg - Anchorage Assemblywoman
- Larry Shooshanian
- Dan Sullivan - former Anchorage Assemblyman
- Richard Wanda

== Results ==
=== First round ===
2009 Anchorage mayoral election (first round)
Party	Candidate	Votes	%
Nonpartisan	Dan Sullivan	25,262	43.38
Nonpartisan	Eric Croft	11,432	19.63
Nonpartisan	Sheila Selkregg	9,473	16.27
Nonpartisan	Walt Monegan	5,063	8.69
Nonpartisan	Matt Claman	3,325	5.71
Nonpartisan	Paul Honeman	2,636	4.53
Nonpartisan	Paul Kendall	146	0.25
Nonpartisan	Dominic Lee	144	0.25
Nonpartisan	Billy Ray Powers	133	0.23
Nonpartisan	Phil Isley	122	0.21
Nonpartisan	Jacob Seth Kern	85	0.15
Nonpartisan	Bob Lupo	83	0.14
Nonpartisan	Larry Shooshanian	59	0.10
Nonpartisan	Richard Wanda	52	0.09
Nonpartisan	Merica Hlatcu	48	0.08
Nonpartisan	Write-ins	170	0.29
Turnout		58,233	29.67

=== Runoff ===
2009 Anchorage mayoral election runoff
Party	Candidate	Votes	%	±%
Nonpartisan	Dan Sullivan	31,194	56.71	+13.33
Nonpartisan	Eric Croft	23,812	43.29	+23.96
Turnout		55,006	22.35	
