= Lynn Gattis =

American politician (born 1957)

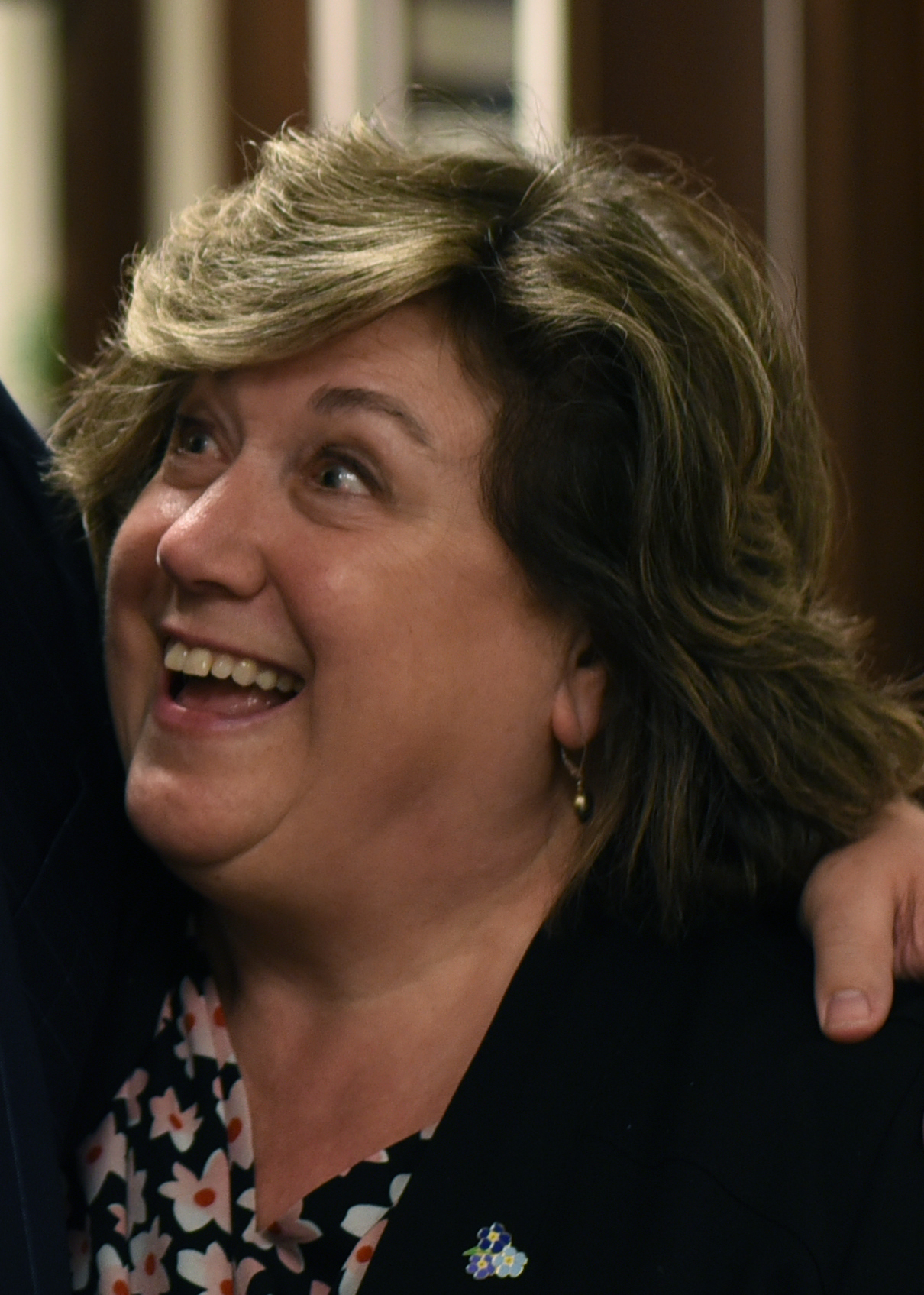

Member of the Alaska House of Representatives from the 9th district
- In office January 18, 2013 – January 16, 2017
- Succeeded by: Colleen Sullivan-Leonard

Personal details
- Born: Arcata, California, U.S.
- Party: Republican
- Education: University of Alaska Anchorage
- Website: lynngattis.com

Lynn Gattis (born 1957 in Arcata, California northwest of Redding) is an American politician. She served as a Republican member of the Alaska House of Representatives from January 2013 to January 2017 and has represented Districts 9 and 7.

== Education ==
Gattis attended the University of Alaska Anchorage.

== Elections ==
- 2012 With Democratic Representative Scott Kawasaki redistricted to District 4, Gattis won the District 9 August 28, 2012 Republican primary with 1,224 votes (61.35%), and won the November 6, 2012 general election with 4,759 votes (72.63%) against Democratic nominee Blake Merrifield.
- 2014 Gattis was unopposed in her primary, and won the general election against independent candidate Verne Rupright with 65% of the vote.
- 2016 With Charlie Huggins retiring from the state senate, Gattis ran for his seat and was defeated 52-47% by Dave Wilson, who at the time was on the city council of Wasilla.
