= Liz Snyder =

American politician (born 1980)

Member of the Alaska House of Representatives from the 27th District
- In office January 20, 2021 – January 17, 2023
- Preceded by: Lance Pruitt
- Succeeded by: David Eastman

Personal details
- Born: October 1980 (age 45)
- Party: Democratic
- Spouse: Sam Snyder
- Children: 2
- Education: University of Florida (PhD); Emory University (MPH); University of Florida (BS)
- Occupation: Politician; University Professor

Elizabeth (Liz) Snyder (née Hodges; born October 1980) is an American Democratic politician. She was elected to the Alaska House of Representatives in the 2020 election to represent the 27th district, defeating Minority Leader of the House Lance Pruitt. She didn't run for re-election in 2022.

== Personal life ==
She is married to Sam Snyder. They are living in East Anchorage with their two sons.

== Electoral history ==
Alaska Democratic, Libertarian, and Independence Primary for Alaska House of Representatives District 27, 2018
Party	Candidate	Votes	%
Democratic	Liz Snyder	1,142	100.00
Total votes		1,142	100.00

Alaska House of Representatives District 27 Election, 2018
Party	Candidate	Votes	%
Republican	Lance Pruitt	3,867	50.9
Democratic	Liz Snyder	3,686	48.5
Write-in		45	0.6
Total votes		7,598	100.00
Republican hold			

Alaska Democratic, Libertarian, and Independence Primary for Alaska House of Representatives District 27, 2020
Party	Candidate	Votes	%
Democratic	Liz Snyder	1,904	100.00
Total votes		1,904	100.00

Alaska House of Representatives District 27 Election, 2020
Party	Candidate	Votes	%
Democratic	Liz Snyder	4,574	50.0
Republican	Lance Pruitt	4,563	49.8
Write-in		17	0.2
Total votes		9,154	100.00
Democratic gain from Republican			
