= Forrest Dunbar =

American politician (born 1984)

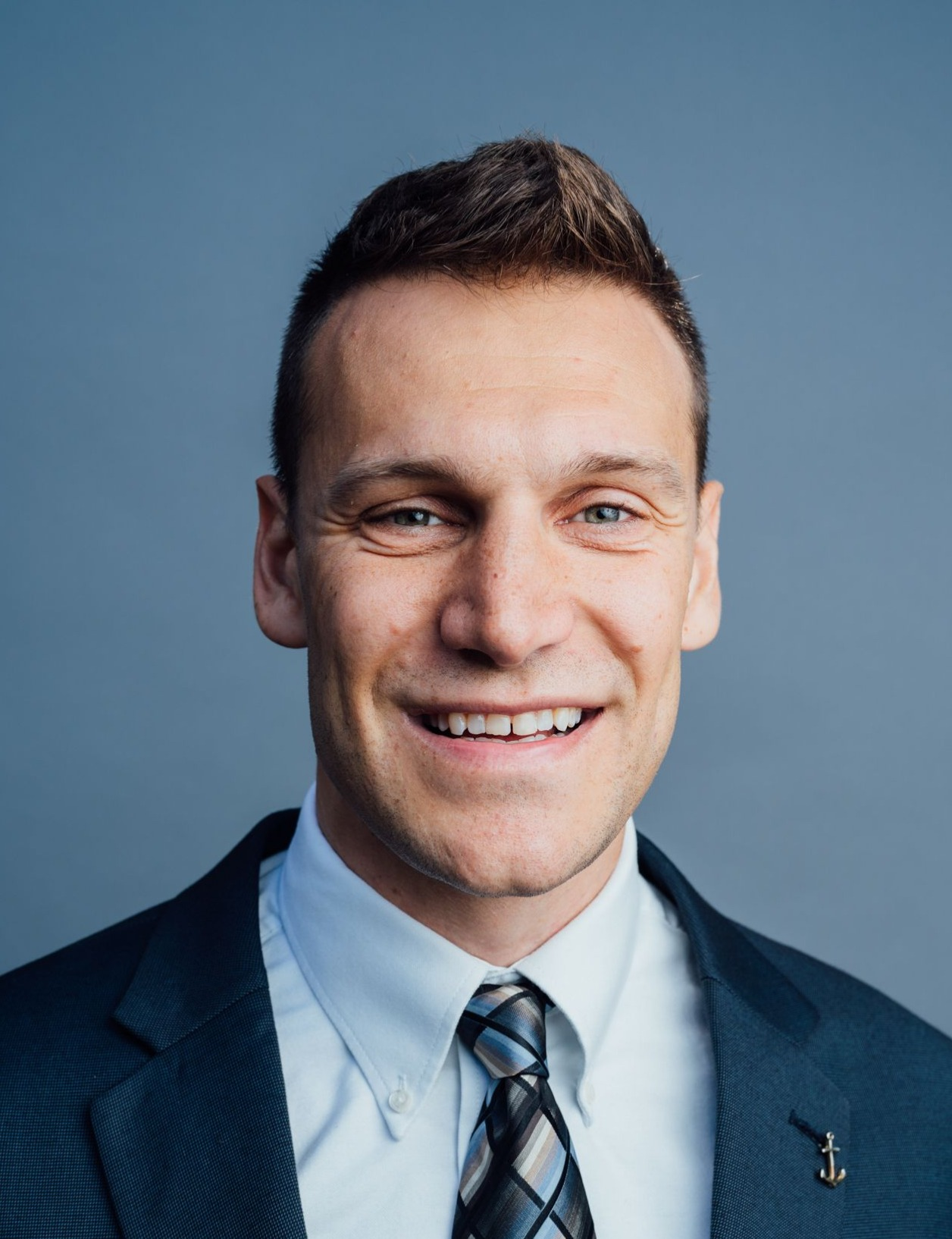

Member of the Alaska Senate from the J district
- Incumbent
- Assumed office January 17, 2023
- Preceded by: Constituency established

Member of the Anchorage Assembly from the 5th district
- In office July 1, 2016 – January 17, 2023
- Preceded by: Paul Honeman
- Succeeded by: Joey Sweet

Personal details
- Born: September 19, 1984 (age 42) Eagle, Alaska, U.S.
- Party: Democratic
- Spouse: Tasha Boyer (m. 2024)
- Education: American University (BA); Harvard University (MPP); Yale University (JD)

Military service
- Branch/service: United States Army
- Years of service: 2013–present
- Rank: Major
- Unit: Alaska Army National Guard

Forrest Dunbar (born September 19, 1984) is an American politician, attorney, and military officer. He is a member of the Alaska Senate, representing East Anchorage District J since 2023. A member of the Democratic Party, he previously served on the Anchorage Assembly from 2016 to 2023. He is a major and Judge Advocate in the Alaska Army National Guard.

== Early life and education ==
Forrest Dunbar grew up in Eagle, Alaska, on the Yukon River, and in Cordova, Alaska, on Prince William Sound. His parents moved to Fairbanks to attend the University of Alaska Fairbanks in the late 1970s. His father Roger worked for the Alaska Department of Fish & Game as a fisheries technician, while his mother, Miriam, was a special education aide and librarian.

Forrest Dunbar attended American University in Washington, D.C., where he earned a Bachelor of Arts in Economics and International Service and won a Harry S. Truman Scholarship. He received a dual MPP/JD from the Harvard Kennedy School in Cambridge, Massachusetts and Yale Law School in New Haven, Connecticut. He was a Peace Corps volunteer who served in Kazakhstan, and an officer and Judge Advocate in the Alaska Army National Guard.

== Political career ==
Dunbar began his political career as an intern for officeholders including Governor Frank Murkowski and U.S. House delegate Madeleine Bordallo. While an intern in Washington, D.C., he participated in peace marches opposing the Iraq War; he credits them as being a significant inspiration for him to enter civil service. Before being involved in electoral politics, Dunbar was a volunteer with the Peace Corps in Kazakhstan.

=== 2014 congressional campaign ===
In 2014, Dunbar launched a campaign for the U.S. House of Representatives running against Republican incumbent Don Young, who had represented Alaska's at-large congressional district for 41 years and was running for his 21st full term. Dunbar easily won the nomination in the primary; Libertarian candidate Jim McDermott also advanced to the general election. Dunbar received 41% of the vote in the general election, losing to Young by 10 percentage points in the closest race for the seat since 2008.

=== Anchorage Assembly ===
Dunbar was first elected to the Anchorage Assembly in 2016, defeating Terre Gales with 61.6% of the vote in the fifth district, representing the eastern portion of the city. Dunbar has been re-elected twice, in 2019 unopposed, and in 2022 with 55.4% of the vote against Stephanie Taylor. At the time of his retirement, he was the second-longest serving incumbent member of the assembly behind Pete Petersen, who has served since 2014 in the same district. Dunbar says he focuses his efforts on "jobs, quality of life, and public safety," as well as expanding the Anchorage Police Department and increasing the city's snow removal budget.

He has worked to increase funding in his district to improve the city's infrastructure, beginning projects for upgrades to roads and drainage, improvements to Russian Jack Springs Park, and increased attention on traffic calming. Twice he has been the assembly chair overseeing new budgets and the city's response to the 2018 earthquake.

=== 2021 mayoral campaign ===
Dunbar announced his candidacy for mayor of Anchorage in September 2019, to succeed term limited mayor Ethan Berkowitz. The landscape of the election changed when Berkowitz resigned in October 2020, although the race remained open, as acting mayor Austin Quinn-Davidson chose not to run for a full term. In a wide-ranging field of candidates, Dunbar's campaign raised the most money and he was endorsed by several local labor unions; he became the front-runner in the race. Many expected there would be a runoff election between Dunbar and a much more conservative candidate. No candidate received 45% of the vote in the first round of the election on April 6, 2021. Dunbar advanced to a runoff against retired Air Force pilot Dave Bronson which was held on May 11. The runoff election was close; Bronson claimed victory with about 1,000 votes out of nearly 90,000 votes cast. After ten days of counting Dunbar conceded the race to Bronson.

=== Alaska Senate ===
After the redistricting cycle brought upon by the release of the 2020 United States census, an independent redistricting commission approved new legislative maps for the Alaska Legislature, in which a district for the Alaska Senate was created, covering most of east Anchorage and Mountain View. State representative Ivy Spohnholz's announced that she would not run for the seat and Dunbar was the first to file for the 2022 election in the district. He faced Republican Andrew Satterfield and Democratic state representative Geran Tarr in the general election. He narrowly won the first round with 50% of the vote, avoiding an instant runoff by winning the election outright.

Dunbar and the 33rd Alaska State Legislature were seated on January 17, 2023. He caucuses with the bipartisan majority coalition, consisting of nine Democrats and eight Republicans.

Dunbar was reelected in 2024, and the bipartisan coalition retained control of the Senate, albeit with a reduced majority.

Dunbar was deployed to Poland as part of his service with the Alaska National Guard in the summer of 2025, but was able to obtain a federal waiver to attend an August 2nd special session called by Governor Mike Dunleavy. Dunbar's attendance enabled the Legislature to override Governor Dunleavy's veto of $50 million in education funding.

== Electoral history ==
Nonpartisan primary
Party	Candidate	Votes	%
Democratic	Forrest Dunbar (incumbent)	2,253	72.3
Independent	Cheronda Smith	863	27.7
Total votes		3,116	100.0

2024 Alaska Senate General election
Party	Candidate	Votes	%
Democratic	Forrest Dunbar (incumbent)	7,292	69.83
Independent	Cheronda Smith	3,022	28.94
Write-in		129	1.24
Total votes		10,443	100.0
Democratic hold			
Coalition hold			

== Personal life ==
Dunbar has a sister and considers his late grandmother, a Holocaust survivor, to be among his greatest role models. His great-grandfather died in the Holocaust. Dunbar practices Judaism and says that his career is guided by following the principle of tikkun olam. He lives in Anchorage and in July 2024, he and Tasha Boyer, a consultant, married.
