= Dan Sullivan (Anchorage mayor) =

American politician

Dan A. Sullivan
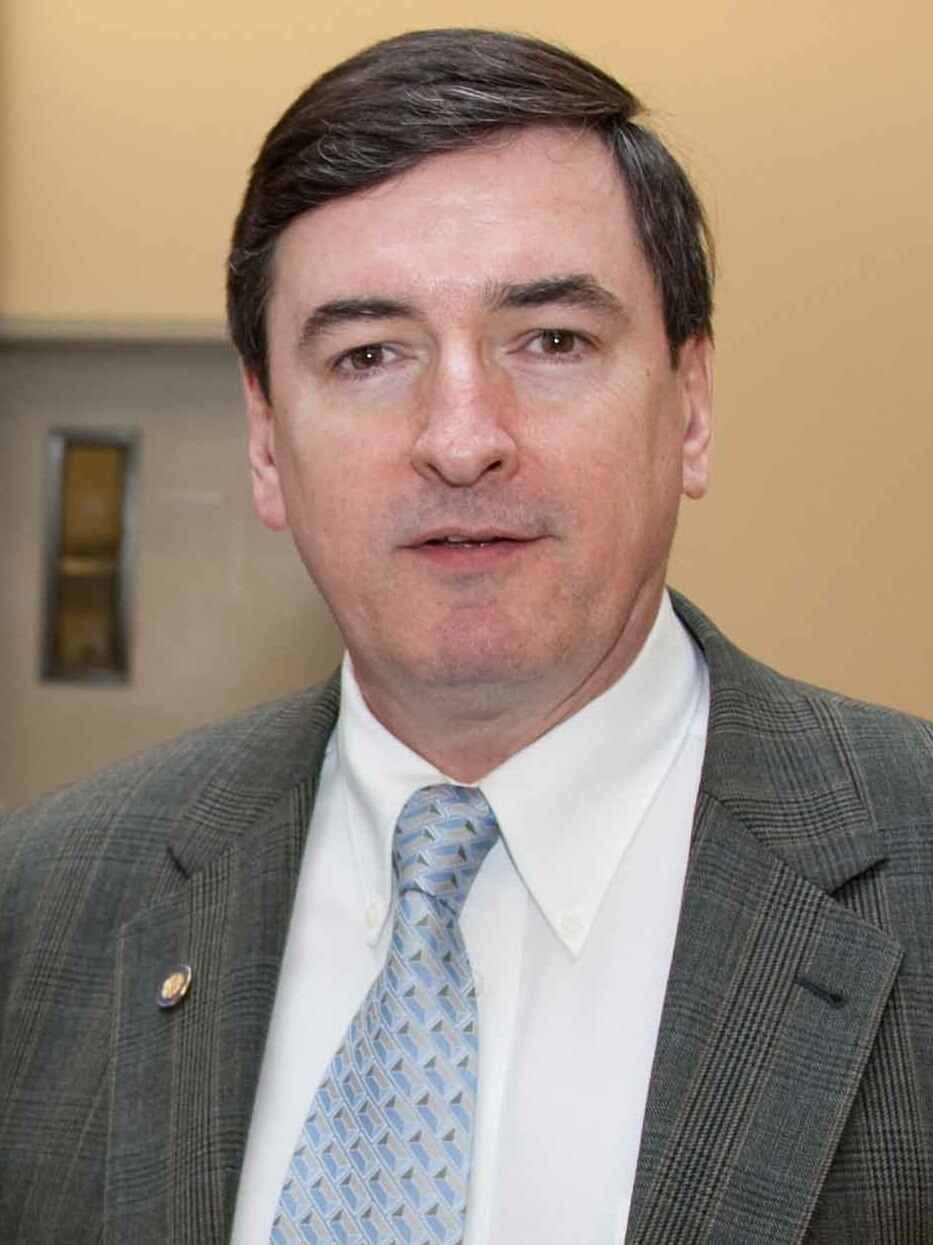
- Sullivan in 2010

Mayor of Anchorage
- In office July 1, 2009 – July 1, 2015
- Preceded by: Mark Begich
- Succeeded by: Ethan Berkowitz

Member of the Anchorage Assembly from Seat E
- In office April 1999 – April 2008
- Preceded by: Joe Murdy
- Succeeded by: Harriet Drummond

Personal details
- Born: Daniel Albert Sullivan; June 16, 1951 (age 75) Fairbanks, Alaska, U.S.
- Party: Republican (1986–present)
- Spouse: Lynnette
- Relations: Colleen Sullivan-Leonard (sister); Susan Sullivan (sister-in-law)
- Children: 1
- Parent: George M. Sullivan (father)
- Education: University of Oregon (BA)

Daniel Albert Sullivan (born June 16, 1951) is an American businessman and politician who served as the mayor of Anchorage from 2009 to 2015 and on the Anchorage Assembly from 1999 to 2008. The son of Anchorage's longest-serving mayor, George M. Sullivan, he was the Republican nominee for lieutenant governor of Alaska in the 2014 election but he and incumbent Governor Sean Parnell were defeated by the ticket of Independent Bill Walker and Democrat Byron Mallott.

== Early life and education ==
Sullivan was born the third of seven sons, and nine children overall, of George Murray and Margaret Mary (née Eagan) Sullivan. His parents were from the Alaskan communities of Valdez and Fairbanks, respectively. The Sullivan family came to Anchorage from Fairbanks in 1958 and 1959, when George Sullivan was hired as a regional executive for Consolidated Freightways. Dan Sullivan graduated from the University of Oregon with a bachelor's degree in political science.

== Career ==
In the mid-1990s, he was the executive director of the Arctic Winter Games, which were held in 1996 in the northern Anchorage communities of Chugiak and Eagle River.

=== Anchorage Assembly ===
In 1999, Sullivan was elected to the first of three consecutive terms on the Anchorage Assembly. During his time on the Assembly, he sponsored an ordinance requiring lobbyists to disclose their affiliations when petitioning city government, which was largely in response to the lobbying efforts conducted within the municipal government by Tom Anderson, who concurrently served in the Alaska House of Representatives. In 2005, he voted against an Anchorage Water and Wastewater Utility rate increase and in 2006 he challenged a city ordinance limiting the size and style of signs.

Sullivan, along with business partners, opened a bar and restaurant in downtown Anchorage in 2006 called McGinley's Pub. Located on G Street on the ground floor of an office building catering mostly to corporate and legal tenants, McGinley's sits due south across the alley from Anchorage's City Hall building, which houses the mayor's office.

=== Mayor of Anchorage ===
In 2007, Sullivan announced his candidacy for mayor of Anchorage. He received the endorsement of then U.S. Senator Ted Stevens. Sullivan campaigned on a platform of reducing city spending and crime, and confronting what he termed "an energy crisis" as the result of dwindling natural gas reserves in Cook Inlet.

Sullivan gained the plurality of votes in the April 7, 2009 general election, in which a record 15 candidates appeared on the ballot, but failed to reach 45 percent, triggering a May 5 runoff against Eric Croft, who had come in second with 19.61% of the vote.

Sales taxes became the major issue in the runoff campaign between Sullivan and Croft, with Croft charging that Sullivan wanted to replace property taxes with a sales tax. Sullivan won the May 5 runoff election with 57.3% of the vote to Croft's 42.7%.

Sullivan was sworn in as mayor on July 1, 2009, succeeding acting mayor Matt Claman. He announced that his administration will introduce a celebration called "All Americans Week."

Mayor Sullivan gained nationwide attention for vetoing Assembly legislation which would have included municipal protections against discrimination based on sexual orientation. Additionally, he passed an ordinance that banned sitting on public sidewalks at certain times and vetoed an attempt by the assembly to repeal it.

Sullivan was re-elected to a second three-year term in April 2012, defeating Assemblyman and former Anchorage Police Department spokesman Paul Honeman. Sullivan announced that Anchorage would submit a bid to host the 2026 Winter Olympic Games, and proposed the redevelopment of an industrial area near Downtown Anchorage known as Ship Creek.

In 2013 he filed papers to run for the office of Lieutenant Governor of Alaska to succeed Mead Treadwell, who was running for the U.S. Senate seat of former Anchorage Mayor Mark Begich. Mayor Sullivan ran unopposed in the Republican primary for that party's Lieutenant Governor nomination, while Treadwell lost his Senate primary to the other Dan Sullivan seeking statewide office in the 2014 Alaskan elections.

Sullivan is a third-generation Alaskan mayor. His paternal grandmother, Viola (née Murray) Sullivan, was mayor of Valdez in the 1930s.

=== 2016 U.S. Senate race ===
On June 1, 2016, Sullivan announced he would be a candidate in the Republican primary for the U.S. Senate seat currently held by Lisa Murkowski. If elected, he would have served alongside Alaska's current junior senator, Dan Sullivan (no relation). However, Sullivan dropped out of the race two weeks later on June 16, 2016. He did not provide a clear explanation of why he withdrew from the race. Erica Martinson, the Washington, D.C., reporter for the Anchorage Daily News said the decision "remains a bit of a mystery".

== See also ==
- 2009 Anchorage mayoral election
- List of mayors of Anchorage, Alaska

Political offices
Preceded by Matt Claman	Mayor of Anchorage; July 1, 2009 – July 1, 2015	Succeeded by Ethan Berkowitz
Preceded by Joe Murdy	Member of the Anchorage Assembly from Seat E April 1999 – April 2008	Succeeded by Harriet Drummond
Party political offices
Preceded by Mead Treadwell	Republican nominee for Lieutenant Governor of Alaska; 2014	Succeeded by Kevin Meyer
