= 2010 Alaska elections =

- November 2, 2010

A general election was held in Alaska on Tuesday, November 2, 2010. The primary elections to select the partisan nominees were held on August 24, 2010.

Two months after the November 2010 elections, incumbent Lisa Murkowski was certified as the winner of the United States Senate race. She ran as a write-in candidate after losing the Republican Party primary to Joe Miller.

== Federal ==
=== United States Senate ===
2010 United States Senate election in Alaska
Party	Candidate	Votes	%
Republican	Lisa Murkowski (incumbent, write-in)	101,091	39.49%
Republican	Joe Miller	90,839	35.49%
Democratic	Scott McAdams	60,045	23.46%
Libertarian	David Haase	1,459	0.57%
Independent	Timothy Carter	927	0.36%
Independent	Ted Gianoutsos	458	0.18%
Write-in	Others	1,143	0.45%
Total votes		255,962	100%

=== United States House of Representatives ===
Alaska's at-large congressional district election, 2010
Party	Candidate	Votes	%
Republican	Don Young (incumbent)	175,384	68.96%
Democratic	Harry Crawford	77,606	30.51%
Write-in		1,345	0.53%
Total votes		254,335	100%

== State ==
=== Governor ===
2010 Alaska gubernatorial election
Party	Candidate	Votes	%
Republican	Sean Parnell (incumbent)	151,318	59.06%
Democratic	Ethan Berkowitz	96,519	37.68%
Independence	Don Wright	4,775	1.86%
Libertarian	Billy Toien	2,682	1.05%
Write-in		898	0.35%
Total votes		256,192	100%

=== State judiciary ===
Two statewide judicial positions were up for retention in 2010.

==== State Supreme Court ====
One justice on the Alaska Supreme Court was up for retention: Justice Dana Fabe who was appointed by Governor Tony Knowles in 1996.

Results by state house district Yes: 50–60%; 60–70%; 70–80%; No: 50–60%; 60–70%

Justice Fabe retention, 2010
Choice	Votes	%
For	126,885	54.36
Against	106,524	45.64
Total	233,409	100.00

==== Court of Appeals ====
One judge on the Alaska Court of Appeals was up for retention: Judge David Mannheimer who was appointed by Governor Steve Cowper in 1990.

Results by state house district Yes: 50–60%; 60–70%; 70–80%; No: 50–60%

Judge Mannheimer retention, 2010
Choice	Votes	%
For	132,048	61.63
Against	82,223	38.37
Total	214,271	100.00

=== State legislature ===
==== State Senate ====
Alaska Senate
Party	Before	After	Change
Republican	10	10	Steady
Democratic	10	10	Steady
Total	20	20	

==== State House of Representatives ====
Alaska House of Representatives
Party	Before	After	Change
Republican	21	24	▲3
Democratic	18	16	▼2
Vacant	1	0	▼1
Total	40	40	

== Ballot measures ==
Five statewide ballot measures appeared on the ballot in 2010: two in August and three in November.

=== Measure 1 (August) ===
The Ban on Use of Public Funds for Campaigns, Lobbying, and Contractor Restrictions Initiative would prohibit the use of public funds for political campaigns and lobbying and prohibit political contributions from government contractors and their families.

Results by state house district No: 50–60%; 60–70%; 70–80%

Ballot Measure 1 (August)
Choice	Votes	%
For	62,909	39.22
Against	97,478	60.78
Total	160,387	100.00
Source: Alaska Division of Elections

=== Measure 2 ===
The Parental Notification of Abortion Initiative would forbid minors from getting an abortion without a doctor informing at least one parent.

Results by state house district Yes: 50–60%; 60–70%; 70–80%; No: 50–60%; 60–70%

Ballot Measure 2
Choice	Votes	%
For	90,259	56.06
Against	70,746	43.94
Total	161,005	100.00
Source: Alaska Division of Elections

=== Measure 1 (November) ===
The Increase Size of State Legislature Amendment would add four more representatives and two more senators to the Alaska State Legislature.

Results by state house district Yes: 50–60%; No: 50–60%; 60–70%; 70–80%

Ballot Measure 1 (November)
Choice	Votes	%
For	99,490	40.24
Against	147,744	59.76
Total	247,234	100.00
Source: Alaska Division of Elections

=== Bonding Proposition A ===
The Revenue Bonds for Veterans' Mortgage Program Measure would allow the state to guarantee up to $600 million in revenue bonds issued by the Alaska Housing Finance Corporation to purchase residential mortgages for qualifying veterans.

Results by state house district Yes: 50–60%; 60–70%; 70–80%

Bonding Proposition A
Choice	Votes	%
For	152,629	61.98
Against	93,624	38.02
Total	246,253	100.00
Source: Alaska Division of Elections

=== Bonding Proposition B ===
The Library, Education, and Research Facilities Bond Measure would issue $397.2 million in general obligation bonds to fund library, education, and educational research facilities.

Results by state house district Yes: 50–60%; 60–70%; 70–80%; No: 50–60%

Bonding Proposition B
Choice	Votes	%
For	147,980	59.38
Against	101,246	40.62
Total	249,226	100.00
Source: Alaska Division of Elections
