= George M. Sullivan =

American politician

George Sullivan
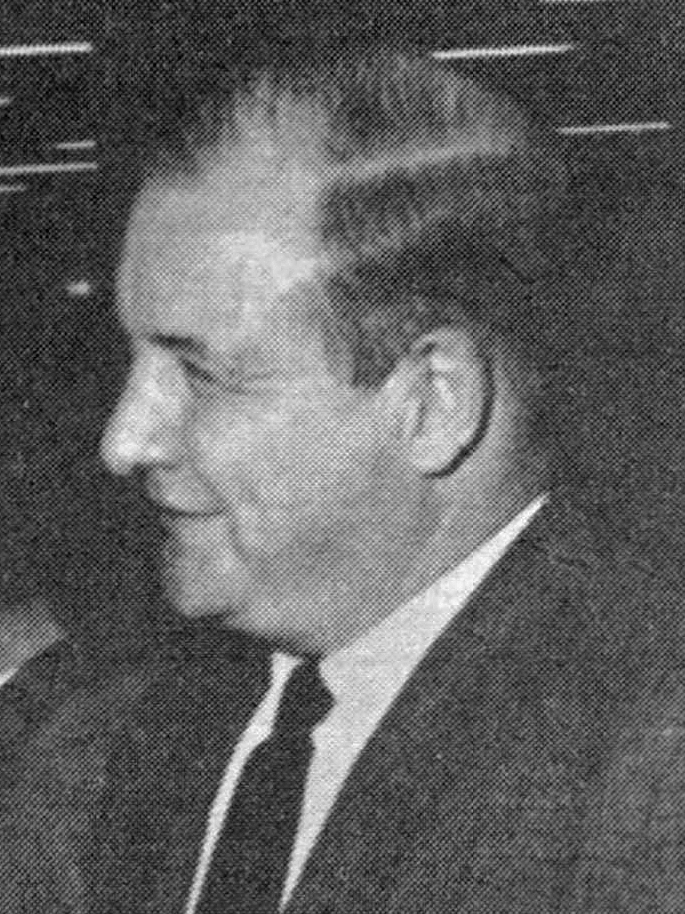
- Sullivan in 1969

1st Mayor of the Municipality of Anchorage
- In office September 16, 1975 – December 31, 1981
- Preceded by: Office established
- Succeeded by: Tony Knowles

26th Mayor of the City of Anchorage
- In office October 9, 1967 – September 16, 1975
- Preceded by: Elmer E. Rasmuson
- Succeeded by: Office abolished Himself as Mayor of the Municipality of Anchorage

Member of the Anchorage City Council
- In office 1965–1967

Member of the Alaska House of Representatives from the 8th district
- In office January 27, 1964 – January 25, 1965
- Appointed by: William A. Egan
- Preceded by: William H. Sanders
- Succeeded by: Multi-member district

Member of the Fairbanks City Council
- In office 1955–1959

Personal details
- Born: George Murray Sullivan; March 31, 1922 Portland, Oregon, U.S.
- Died: September 23, 2009 (aged 87) Anchorage, Alaska, U.S.
- Party: Republican
- Spouse: Margaret Eagan Sullivan
- Children: 9, including Dan and Colleen

Military service
- Branch/service: United States Army
- Battles/wars: World War II

George Murray Sullivan (March 31, 1922 – September 23, 2009) was an American politician who served as the 26th mayor of the City of Anchorage from 1967 to 1975 and the 1st mayor of the Municipality of Anchorage from 1975 to 1981.

== Early life ==
His father was Harvey Sullivan, a U.S. District Marshal who had followed the Chilkoot Trail in 1898 to join the Klondike Gold Rush.

Sullivan was born in Portland, Oregon and raised in Valdez, Alaska, then the location of the federal court for the Third Judicial District of the Territory of Alaska. His mother was elected mayor in 1934. During the summer of 1937, he lied about his age in order to obtain a job at the Kennecott Mines; he was only 15, and the minimum age was 16.

After graduating from Valdez High School, Sullivan went on to join the United States Army during World War II and served in the Aleutian Islands.

== Career ==
After the war, he lived in Nenana and worked as a deputy marshal. In 1952, the family moved to Fairbanks, where Sullivan was employed as the manager of a freight company. He was elected to the city council and became active in the Republican Party. In 1959, the family moved to Anchorage, having been transferred there by the freight company. Sullivan would continue to play a role in the Fairbanks community for years to come. He is listed as one of the original incorporators of Mt. McKinley Bank, founded in 1965.

In 1964, Sullivan was appointed to the Alaska House of Representatives to fill a vacancy created by the appointment of Representative William H. Sanders to the Alaska Superior Court. In 1965 he was elected to the Anchorage City Council, and in 1967, he was elected mayor of Anchorage.

In 1975, the Greater Anchorage Area Borough unified with the City of Anchorage and several smaller cities to become the Municipality of Anchorage. Sullivan, the city mayor, defeated Jack Roderick, the borough mayor to become mayor of the new city government. Sullivan fulfilled the maximum two terms mandated by the municipal charter, handing over the reins to Tony Knowles on January 1, 1982.

In 1976, he vetoed an anti-discrimination bill extending protection to sexual orientation. This became a campaign issue in the 1978 mayoral race, where he successfully defended his seat against challenger Dave Rose. In 1979, he invited Pope John Paul II to visit Anchorage. On February 26, 1981, the pope visited the city.

Toward the end of the 1970s, he proposed what he called "Project 80s", a campaign of beautification and preservation of historic sites. After his lengthy tenure as mayor, Sullivan served as the senior vice president of Western Airlines.

== Legacy ==
The Sullivan Arena in Anchorage, constructed in 1983 as a part of Project 80s, was named in his honor.

Margaret Eagan Sullivan Park, located at the northern end of Spenard Road where it crosses Chester Creek, was named for Sullivan's wife.

Marc Marlow, an Anchorage electrical contractor turned real estate developer, began an ambitious urban renewal project in the northeastern corner of downtown Anchorage. The centerpiece of the project was the rebuilding of the McKinley Tower, constructed in the early 1950s and abandoned in 1984. Adjacent to that building, Marlow constructed an assisted living facility and named it the George M. Sullivan House.

== Personal life ==
He married Margaret Eagan Sullivan, the youngest daughter of Daniel and Isabelle Eagan of Fairbanks. Together, they had nine children, including Anchorage Mayor Dan Sullivan, and daughter Colleen Sullivan-Leonard, who served two terms in the Alaska House, 2017 through 2021. Sullivan died from complications from lung cancer on September 23, 2009. He was preceded in death by his wife, Margaret, and their son, Harvey (1996), and followed by their sons, Michael (2018) and George, Jr.(2020).

Preceded by Elmer E. Rasmuson	Mayor of Anchorage; 1967–1981	Succeeded by Tony Knowles
