= Colleen Sullivan-Leonard =

American politician (born 1959)

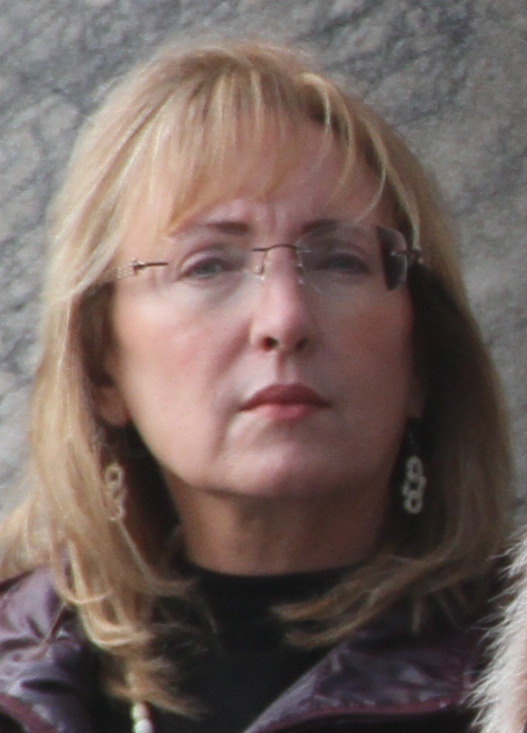

Member of the Alaska House of Representatives from the 7th District
- In office January 17, 2017 – January 19, 2021
- Preceded by: Lynn Gattis
- Succeeded by: Christopher Kurka

Personal details
- Born: 1959 (age 66–67) Fairbanks, Alaska
- Party: Republican
- Spouse: Ted
- Relations: George Sullivan (father); Dan Sullivan (brother)

Colleen Sullivan-Leonard (born 1959) is an American politician from Alaska. A Republican, she represented District 7 in the Alaska House of Representatives.

== Political career ==
Sullivan-Leonard served on the Wasilla City Council from 2001 to 2003 and again from 2010 to 2016.

In 2016, Sullivan-Leonard successfully ran for the Alaska House of Representatives, succeeding Lynn Gattis. She defeated Brandon Montano in the 2016 Republican primary and Democrat Sherie Olson in the general election. In 2020, Sullivan-Leonard declined to run for a third term to be closer to home for work and family. She presently serves on the Wasilla City Council as of 2022.
