= Natasha von Imhof =

American politician (born 1970)

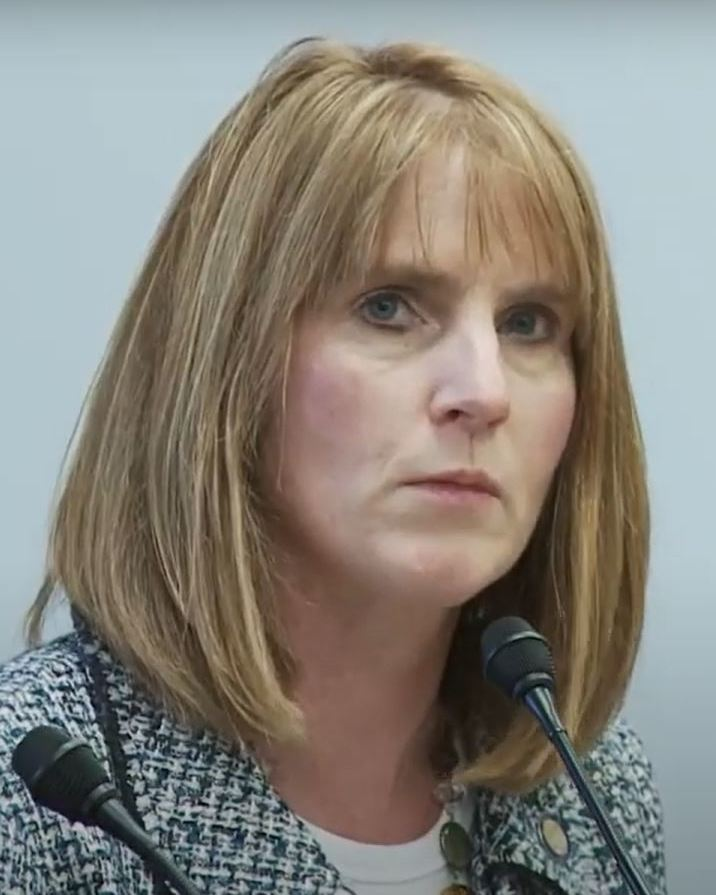

Member of the Alaska Senate from the L district
- In office January 23, 2017 – January 17, 2023
- Preceded by: Lesil McGuire

Personal details
- Born: Natasha Ann Rasmuson Anchorage, Alaska, U.S.
- Party: Republican
- Education: Harvard College (BS); University of Washington (MBA)
- Profession: Financial analyst
- Website: natashaforalaskastatesenate.com

Natasha Ann von Imhof (née Rasmuson; born June 1970) is an American politician and was a Republican member of the Alaska Senate. She represented District L from January 23, 2017 to January 17, 2023. Ms. Von Imhof served on the Anchorage School Board from 2012-2015. From 2017-2023, she served South Anchorage as a state senator in Juneau, serving on the Finance (Co-chair 2019-2020), Health and Social Service, Resource Committees, Legislative Council, and Legislative Budget and Audit Committees (Chair 2021-2022).
