= Robert Yundt =

American politician

Member of the Alaska Senate
- Incumbent
- Assumed office January 21, 2025
- Preceded by: David S. Wilson
- Constituency: N

Mat-Su Borough Assemblyman for the 4th district
- In office November 17, 2020 – September 10, 2024
- Preceded by: Ted Leonard
- Succeeded by: Maxwell Sumner

Personal details
- Born: Wasilla, Alaska, U.S.
- Party: Republican

Robert Yundt is an American politician who is a member of the Alaska Senate representing District N. He previously served on the Mat-Su Borough Assembly representing the 4th district from 2020 to 2024.

== Early life and Mat-Su Borough Assembly ==
Robert Yundt was born in Wasilla, Alaska, where he has lived his entire life. After graduating from Wasilla High School, he ran two real estate businesses. In 2020, Yundt was elected to the Mat-Su Borough Assembly representing the 4th district. He was reelected in 2023 and resigned on September 5, 2024, after moving out of the district. Maxwell Sumner was appointed to succeed Yundt.

== Electoral history ==
Nonpartisan primary
Party	Candidate	Votes	%
Coalition Republican	David Wilson (incumbent)	1,724	41.4
Republican	Robert Yundt	1,360	32.7
Republican	Stephen Wright	1,080	25.9
Total votes		4,164	100.0

2024 Alaska Senate General election
Party	Candidate	Votes	%
Republican	Robert Yundt	8,163	52.69
Coalition Republican	David S. Wilson (incumbent)	4,525	29.21
Republican	Stephen Wright	2,619	16.9
Write-in		186	1.2
Total votes		15,493	100.0
Republican hold			
Minority Caucus gain from Coalition			
