= Fred Dyson =

American politician

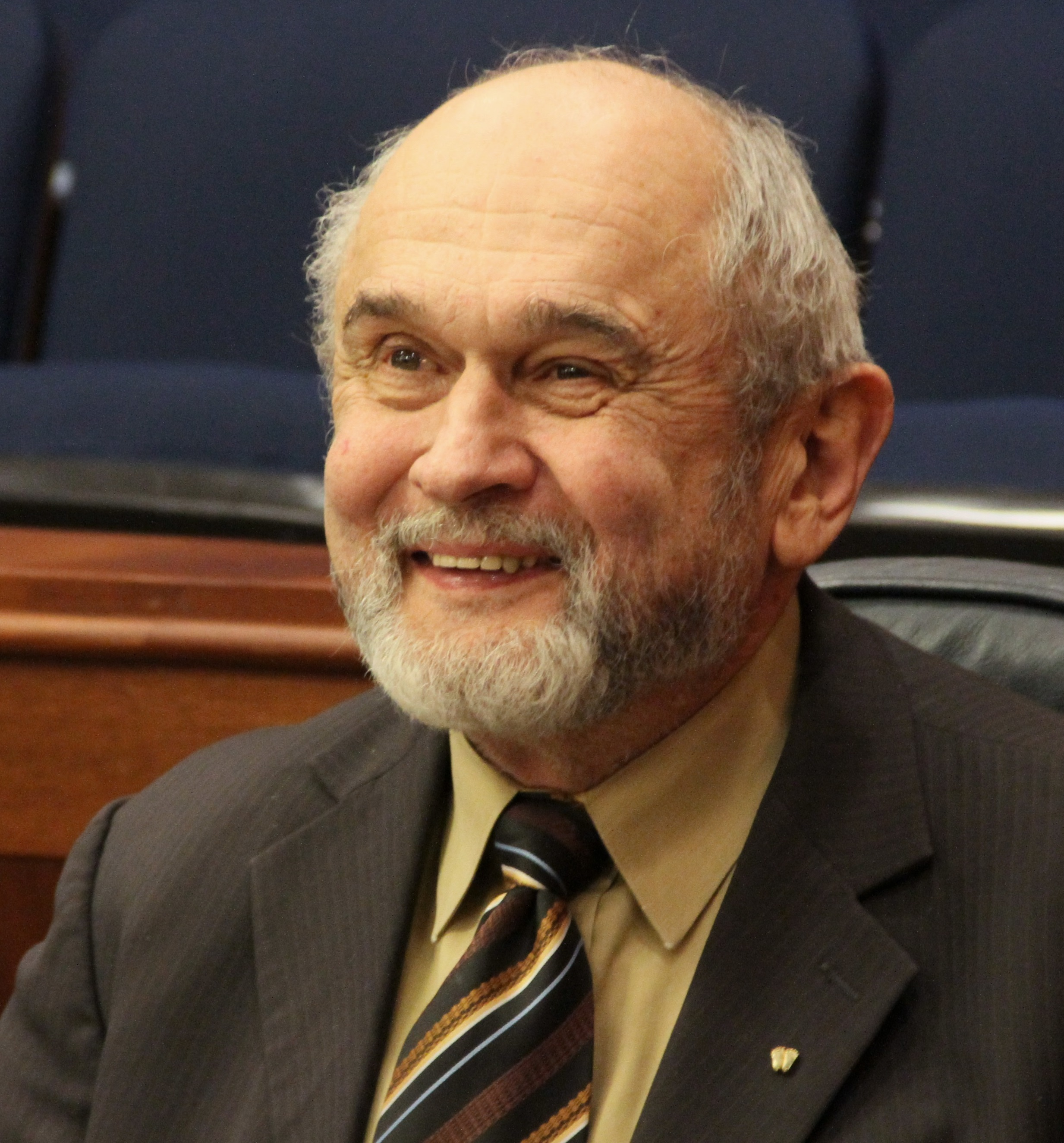

Member of the Alaska Senate from the F district
- In office January 15, 2013 – January 15, 2015
- Preceded by: redistricted
- Succeeded by: redistricted

Member of the Alaska Senate from the I district
- In office January 21, 2003 – January 15, 2013
- Preceded by: redistricted
- Succeeded by: redistricted

Member of the Alaska House of Representatives from the 11th district
- In office 1997–2002

Personal details
- Born: Frederick John Dyson; January 16, 1939 (age 87) Vancouver, Canada
- Party: Republican
- Spouse: Jane
- Children: 3
- Education: University of Washington

Frederick John Dyson (born January 16, 1939) was a Republican member of the Alaska Senate, serving since 2003. He represented District I from 2003 through 2012 until redistricting placed him in District F in 2013. District I contained the core community of Eagle River, where Dyson resides, and stretched across the northern edge of Anchorage municipal boundaries to Government Hill, also including the core area of Joint Base Elmendorf-Richardson. After being redistricted again in 2012 he declined to run for reelection in 2014 against another incumbent, Anna Fairclough.

Dyson formerly served in the Alaska House of Representatives from 1997 to 2003. Prior to that, he represented a district nearly identical to his current Senate district as a member of the Anchorage Assembly. Currently Dyson is the District 2, Seat C representative on the Anchorage Assembly, having won a first term in the general election on April 4, 2017.

Dyson is a mechanical engineer, mariner and writer by profession. He wrote a column for the Anchorage Times for many years. He and his wife have raised over a dozen foster children. In fact, his first exposure in the political arena, prior to being elected to office, was as a public advocate for foster parenting.

Dyson was born in Vancouver, British Columbia. He graduated from Highline High School in the Seattle area, and studied engineering at the University of Washington. He moved to Alaska in 1964. He and his wife Jane, a retired therapist, have been married since 1966; they have three daughters.
