= David S. Wilson =

American politician

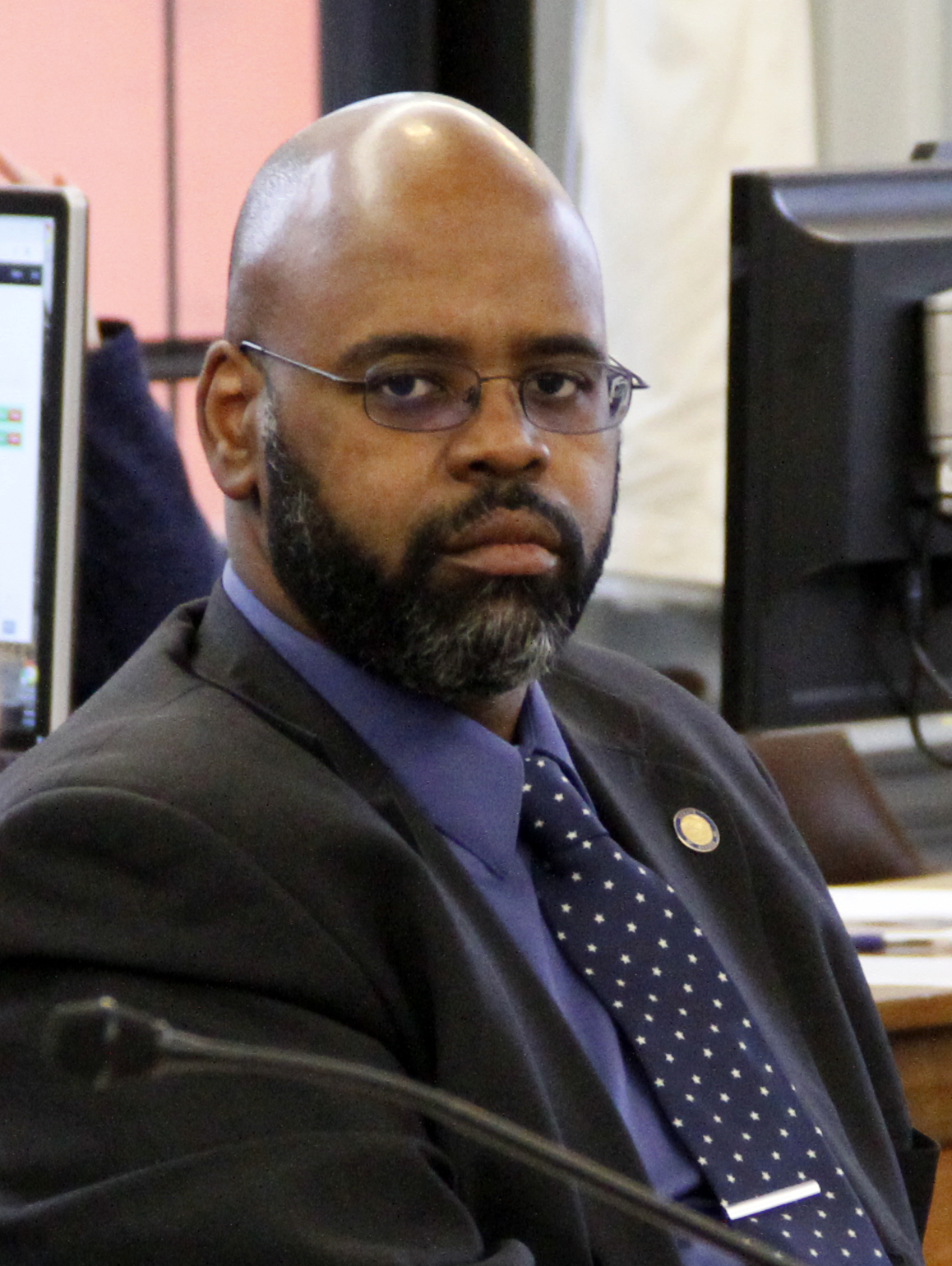
- Wilson in 2020

Member of the Alaska Senate
- In office January 17, 2017 – January 21, 2025
- Preceded by: Charlie Huggins
- Succeeded by: Robert Yundt
- Constituency: D (2017–2023); N (2023–2025)

Personal details
- Born: David Sylvester Wilson; 1981 (age 44–45) California
- Party: Republican
- Spouse: Aleta
- Education: Alaska Pacific University

David Sylvester Wilson (born 1981) is an American politician from Alaska. A Republican, Wilson represented Wasilla in the Alaska Senate from 2017 to 2025. He formerly served as a city councilman in Wasilla.

Wilson was elected to the Senate at the age of 35. He narrowly defeated Representative Lynn Gattis in the Republican primary to succeed longtime Senator Charlie Huggins, who was retiring, in August 2016. He was endorsed in his campaign by the conservative Republican Assembly but did not run with the backing of the Alaska Republican Party. He was previously an unaffiliated voter, registering with the Republican Party less than a year before his primary victory.

Upon being sworn in on January 17, 2017, Wilson became the first African American elected to the Senate from Alaska's Matanuska-Susitna Valley, Wilson is the eighth African American to serve in the Alaska Legislature. Of those eight, he is the third Republican, the second senator, the first Republican senator and the first to represent an area of Alaska outside of Anchorage or Fairbanks.

== Legislative accomplishments ==
Senator Wilson has sponsored successful legislation every year he has been in office to date. This legislation includes:

- SB 46 (2017): "An Act establishing October 25 of each year as African American Soldiers' Contribution to Building the Alaska Highway Day."
- SB 134 (2018): "An Act relating to medical assistance reimbursement for the services of licensed professional counselors; and providing for an effective date."
- SB 55 (2019): "An Act relating to judges of the court of appeals; and providing for an effective date."
- SB 25 (2019): "An Act extending the termination date of the Board of Dental Examiners; and providing for an effective date."
- SB 43 (2019): "An Act extending the termination date of the Board of Barbers and Hairdressers; extending the termination date of the Big Game Commercial Services Board; relating to a person's eligibility to hold a registered guide-outfitter license, master guide-outfitter license, class-A assistant guide license, assistant guide license, or transporter license; and providing for an effective date."
- SB 134 (2020): "An Act relating to medical assistance reimbursement for the services of licensed professional counselors; and providing for an effective date."
- SB 24 (2021): "An Act relating to holding corporate meetings by remote communication; allowing voting by remote communication at corporate meetings; making shareholder lists available electronically; relating to for-profit and nonprofit corporations; relating to business and industrial development corporations; relating to Native corporations; relating to the Alaska Banking Code; and providing for an effective date."
- SB 70 (2021): "An Act relating to opioid overdose drugs; and providing for an effective date."

== Controversies ==
On May 2, 2017, Wilson allegedly slapped Nathaniel Herz of the Alaska Dispatch News during an encounter in the Alaska State Capitol in Juneau. The event was recorded by Herz's smartphone as the reporter was questioning Wilson on his reaction to a recent article about a bill proposed by Wilson. Herz filed a police report that day.

On December 12, 2017, the Alaska Office of Special Prosecutions declined to pursue charges against Wilson for a May incident in which he allegedly slapped Anchorage Daily News reporter Nathaniel Herz. In a letter Tuesday to Juneau police, Chief Assistant Attorney General Andrew Peterson wrote that it is unlikely the state will be able to prove beyond a reasonable doubt that Wilson acted with the specific intent to harass or annoy Herz, the standard for determining harassment in the second degree.

Wilson was cleared of sexual harassment claims by a female legislative aide who claimed he placed a cell phone near her legs. He was, however, found responsible for retaliatory actions against the person who made the complaint by talking about it. Senate President Pete Kelly ordered that Wilson be given a probationary period, during which he would be restricted in travel, demonstrate he knows proper decorum and understands retaliation.

== Personal life ==
Wilson was born in California and raised in a Christian household. He attended Alaska Pacific University, earning a degree in psychology, where he met his wife, Aleta.

== Electoral history ==
Nonpartisan primary
Party	Candidate	Votes	%
Coalition Republican	David Wilson (incumbent)	1,724	41.4
Republican	Robert Yundt	1,360	32.7
Republican	Stephen Wright	1,080	25.9
Total votes		4,164	100.0

2024 Alaska Senate General election
Party	Candidate	Votes	%
Republican	Robert Yundt	8,163	52.69
Coalition Republican	David S. Wilson (incumbent)	4,525	29.21
Republican	Stephen Wright	2,619	16.9
Write-in		186	1.2
Total votes		15,493	100.0
Republican hold			
Minority Caucus gain from Coalition			

== See also ==
- Black conservatism in the United States
- List of African-American Republicans
- List of first African-American U.S. state legislators
