= Ken McCarty =

American politician (born 1958)

Member of the Alaska House of Representatives
- In office January 19, 2021 – January 17, 2023
- Preceded by: Sharon Jackson
- Succeeded by: Andy Josephson (redistricting)
- Constituency: 13th district

Personal details
- Born: Kennith Earl McCarty; 1958 (age 67–68) Eureka, California, U.S.
- Party: Republican
- Education: Biola University; Western Seminary
- Occupation: Marital therapist

Kennith Earl McCarty (born 1958) is an American Republican politician from Alaska. He represented District 13 as a Member of the Alaska House of Representatives from 2021 to 2023.

== Electoral history ==
Nonpartisan primary
Party	Candidate	Votes	%
Coalition Republican	Kelly Merrick (incumbent)	2,332	33.9
Republican	Jared Goecker	2,247	32.7
Democratic	Lee Hammermeister	1,003	14.6
Republican	Ken McCarty (withdrew)	779	11.3
Republican	Sharon Jackson (withdrew)	513	7.5
Total votes		6,874	100.0

After the primary, McCarty withdrew from the race and endorsed Goecker. This would normally mean that Jackson, the fifth-place finisher, would move up, but she also withdrew and endorsed Goecker.

2024 Alaska Senate General election
Party	Candidate	First choice			Round 1			Round 2	
Party	Candidate	Votes	%	Transfer	Votes	%	Transfer	Votes	%
Coalition Republican	Kelly Merrick	9,050	46.3%	+42	9,092	46.5%	+800	9,892	55.5%
Republican	Jared Goecker	7,685	39.3%	+13	7,698	39.4%	+241	7,939	44.5%
Democratic	Lee Hammermeister	2,754	14.1%	+16	2,770	14.2%	-2,770	Eliminated	
Write-in		51	0.3%	-51	Eliminated				
Total votes		19,540			19,560			17,831	
Blank or inactive ballots					780		+1,729	2,509	
Republican hold									
Coalition hold									
