= Kelly Merrick =

American politician (born 1975)

- Merrick's Official Headshot

Member of the Alaska Senate
- Incumbent
- Assumed office January 17, 2023
- Preceded by: Lora Reinbold (District G)
- Constituency: L

Member of the Alaska House of Representatives
- In office January 16, 2019 – January 17, 2023
- Preceded by: Lora Reinbold
- Succeeded by: Jamie Allard (District 23)
- Constituency: 14

Personal details
- Born: 1975 (age 50–51) Juneau, Alaska, U.S.
- Party: Republican
- Spouse: Joey Merrick

Kelly Merrick (née Richards; born 1975) is an American politician from Alaska. A Republican, Merrick was elected to the Alaska State Senate in 2022, representing District L in Eagle River. She was a member of the Alaska House of Representatives from 2019 to 2023. She took office as State Senator on January 17, 2023.

== Early life and career ==
Merrick worked as a staffer in the Alaska Legislature and served an aide (Secretary) to U.S. Rep. Don Young for 6 months.

== Political career ==
Merrick ran for election to the Alaska House to succeed Lora Reinbold, who ran for the Alaska Senate. Merrick defeated Jamie Allard and Eugene Harnett in a 3-way race of the Republican primary and nonpartisan Joe Hackenmueller in the general election. Rep. Merrick was censured by Republican District 14 for caucusing with the Democrats in 2021. The Alaska Republican State Central Committee also voted to censure Merrick and no longer recognizes Merrick as a Republican.

== Electoral history ==
Nonpartisan primary
Party	Candidate	Votes	%
Coalition Republican	Kelly Merrick (incumbent)	2,332	33.9
Republican	Jared Goecker	2,247	32.7
Democratic	Lee Hammermeister	1,003	14.6
Republican	Ken McCarty (withdrew)	779	11.3
Republican	Sharon Jackson (withdrew)	513	7.5
Total votes		6,874	100.0

After the primary, McCarty withdrew from the race and endorsed Goecker. This would normally mean that Jackson, the fifth place finisher, would move up, but she also withdrew and endorsed Goecker.

2024 Alaska Senate General election
Party	Candidate	First choice			Round 1			Round 2	
Party	Candidate	Votes	%	Transfer	Votes	%	Transfer	Votes	%
Coalition Republican	Kelly Merrick	9,050	46.3%	+42	9,092	46.5%	+800	9,892	55.5%
Republican	Jared Goecker	7,685	39.3%	+13	7,698	39.4%	+241	7,939	44.5%
Democratic	Lee Hammermeister	2,754	14.1%	+16	2,770	14.2%	-2,770	Eliminated	
Write-in		51	0.3%	-51	Eliminated				
Total votes		19,540			19,560			17,831	
Blank or inactive ballots					780		+1,729	2,509	
Republican hold									
Coalition hold									
