= James D. Kaufman =

American politician

Member of the Alaska Senate from the F district
- Incumbent
- Assumed office January 2023
- Preceded by: Josh Revak (District M)

Member of the Alaska House of Representatives from the 28th district
- In office January 2021 – January 2023
- Preceded by: Jennifer Johnston
- Succeeded by: Julie Coulombe (District 11)

Personal details
- Born: James Denis Kaufman; 1958 (age 67–68) Neptune, New Jersey, U.S.
- Party: Republican
- Occupation: Project manager

James Denis Kaufman (born 1958) is an American Republican politician from Anchorage, Alaska. He represents District F in South Anchorage in the Alaska Senate and previously served in the Alaska House of Representatives from 2021 to 2023. At the time of his election to the legislature in November 2000, he was retired from a career as a construction project manager in the oil industry and was active in neighborhood level politics in the Hillside area of Anchorage.

== Electoral history ==
=== District F ===
Nonpartisan primary
Party	Candidate	Votes	%
Democratic	Janice Park	2,737	48.8
Coalition Republican	James D. Kaufman (incumbent)	2,563	45.7
Republican	Harold Borbridge	307	5.5
Total votes		5,607	100.0

2024 Alaska Senate General election
Party	Candidate	First choice			Round 1			Round 2	
Party	Candidate	Votes	%	Transfer	Votes	%	Transfer	Votes	%
Coalition Republican	James D. Kaufman	8,147	47.9%	+33	8,180	48.1%	+498	8,678	52.8%
Democratic	Janice Park	7,646	45.0%	+11	7,657	45.0%	+87	7,744	47.2%
Republican	Harold Borbridge	1,178	6.9%	+6	1,184	7.0%	-	Eliminated	
Write-in		35	0.21%	-	Eliminated				
Total votes		17,006			17,021			16,422	
Blank or inactive ballots					946		+599	1,545	
Republican hold									
Coalition hold									
