= Charlie Huggins =

American politician (born 1947)

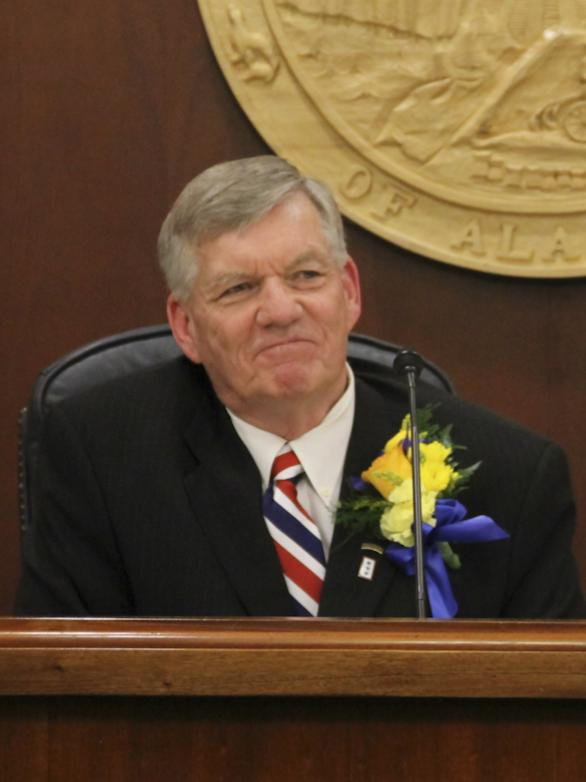
- Huggins presiding over the Alaska Senate

President of the Alaska State Senate
- In office January 15, 2013 – January 20, 2015
- Preceded by: Gary Stevens
- Succeeded by: Kevin Meyer

Member of the Alaska Senate from the D district H (2004–2013) E (2013–2015)
- In office September 24, 2004 – January 14, 2017
- Preceded by: Scott Ogan
- Succeeded by: David S. Wilson

Personal details
- Born: January 27, 1947 (age 79) High Springs, Florida, U.S.
- Party: Republican
- Spouse: Becky Huggins
- Children: Hallie; Chad; Cody
- Education: Florida State University; Webster University; CSG Western Legislative Academy
- Profession: United States Army

Charles R. Huggins (born January 27, 1947) is an American politician who was a Republican member of the Alaska Senate, representing District D. He was President of the Alaska Senate during the 28th Alaska Legislature, leading a caucus of 13 Republicans and 2 Democrats.

Huggins was appointed in 2004 to the Alaska Senate by Governor Frank Murkowski to represent District H. He represented District E following redistricting in 2012.

He filed as a candidate for governor in September 2017. On January 18, 2018, Huggins announced he would drop out of the race for governor.
