= Sharon Jackson =

American politician (born 1962)

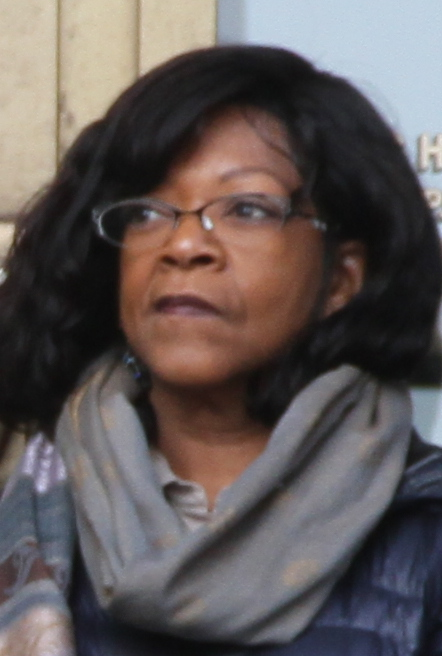

Member of the Alaska House of Representatives from the 13th district
- In office January 17, 2019 – January 19, 2021
- Preceded by: Dan Saddler
- Succeeded by: Ken McCarty

Personal details
- Born: 1962 (age 63–64) Philadelphia, Pennsylvania, U.S.
- Party: Republican
- Spouse: Jim
- Children: 1

Sharon Denise Jackson (born 1962) served on the 31st Alaska House of Representatives on behalf of House District 13 from 2019 to 2021.

== Early life ==
Jackson was born in Philadelphia, Pennsylvania. She attended high school in Pottsgrove, Pennsylvania, and Charter College in Anchorage, Alaska.

== Career ==
She served in the U.S. Army from 1982–1988. In 2015, Jackson served as the Alaska representative for the Republican National Convention. Prior to election she worked as a liaison connecting U.S. Senator Dan Sullivan to his constituents and veterans.

== Electoral history ==
Nonpartisan primary
Party	Candidate	Votes	%
Coalition Republican	Kelly Merrick (incumbent)	2,332	33.9
Republican	Jared Goecker	2,247	32.7
Democratic	Lee Hammermeister	1,003	14.6
Republican	Ken McCarty (withdrew)	779	11.3
Republican	Sharon Jackson (withdrew)	513	7.5
Total votes		6,874	100.0

After the primary, McCarty withdrew from the race and endorsed Goecker. This would normally mean that Jackson, the fifth place finisher, would move up, but she also withdrew and endorsed Goecker.

2024 Alaska Senate General election
Party	Candidate	First choice			Round 1			Round 2	
Party	Candidate	Votes	%	Transfer	Votes	%	Transfer	Votes	%
Coalition Republican	Kelly Merrick	9,050	46.3%	+42	9,092	46.5%	+800	9,892	55.5%
Republican	Jared Goecker	7,685	39.3%	+13	7,698	39.4%	+241	7,939	44.5%
Democratic	Lee Hammermeister	2,754	14.1%	+16	2,770	14.2%	-2,770	Eliminated	
Write-in		51	0.3%	-51	Eliminated				
Total votes		19,540			19,560			17,831	
Blank or inactive ballots					780		+1,729	2,509	
Republican hold									
Coalition hold									

== Personal life ==
She cites her special interests as God, family, and community service.

In 2015, she was hospitalized due to a stroke, resulting in aphasia.
