= Harry Crawford (politician) =

American politician

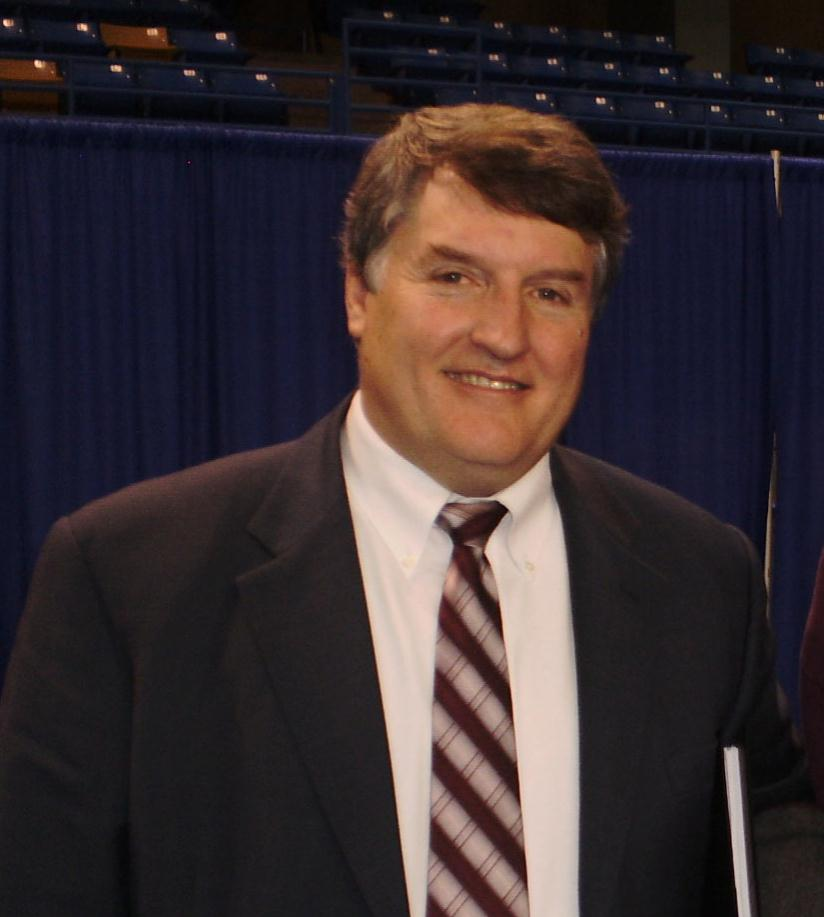

Member of the Alaska House of Representatives from the 21st district 22nd district (2001-2003)
- In office January 14, 2001 – January 17, 2011
- Preceded by: Ramona Barnes
- Succeeded by: Lance Pruitt

Personal details
- Born: April 17, 1952 (age 74) Shreveport, Louisiana, U.S.
- Party: Democratic
- Spouse: Gwen
- Occupation: Ironworker

Harry T. Crawford Jr. (born April 17, 1952) is an American Democratic politician from the U.S. state of Alaska.

A native of Shreveport, Louisiana, Crawford moved to Alaska in 1975 to help construct the Alaska Pipeline as an ironworker.

Along with Eric Croft and David Guttenberg, Crawford sponsored two successful ballot initiatives which passed by wide margins: the Alaska Replacement of U.S. Senators Initiative of 2004, which ensured voters would fill any future Senate vacancies, and the Alaska Campaign Finance Reform Initiative of 2006, which reduced the amount any individual or group could give to a candidate or a political party.

Crawford served as a member of the Alaska House of Representatives from 2001 to 2011—in District 22 from 2001 to 2003, then (after districts were renumbered in redistricting) in District 21 for eight years. In 2000, in his second attempt for the seat, he defeated incumbent Ramona Barnes, who had been the first female Speaker of the House, and was previously defeated for renomination to her House seat in 1984 before regaining it two years later.

In 2010, Crawford ran for Alaska's single at-large seat in the United States House of Representatives. He lost to Republican incumbent Don Young by a landslide. Crawford ran for the state House of Representatives in District 27 in 2016, however he was defeated by incumbent Lance Pruitt.

== See also ==
- United States House of Representatives election in Alaska, 2010
