= Elections in Alaska =

The number of elections in Alaska (Iñupiaq: Alaaskam naliġagviat) varies by year, but typically municipal elections occur every year, plus primary and general elections for federal and state offices occur during even-numbered years. Alaska has a gubernatorial election every four years. Members of the state's United States congressional delegation run for election or re-election at the times set out in the United States Constitution. Primary elections assist in choosing political parties' nominees for various positions. On a regional basis (see list of boroughs and census areas in Alaska), elections also cover municipal issues. In addition, a special election can occur at any time.

In a 2020 study, Alaska was ranked as the 15th hardest state for citizens to vote in.

In 2020, Alaskan voters approved an initiative to implement a nonpartisan blanket top-four primary with a single, open primary where candidates from all parties are listed on the ballot and the top four vote-getters advance to the general election. This system went into effect with the 2022 elections. Prior to this, registered voters in Alaska were given a choice between three primary ballots reflecting a semi-closed primary system. Specifically, Democratic, Libertarian, Alaskan Independence and Independent candidates were listed on one ballot available to all registered voters and Republican candidates were listed on a second ballot available to voters registered as Republican, Nonpartisan or Undeclared. In 2024, Alaskans voted on a measure to repeal the system and return to partisan primaries; the measure narrowly failed to pass.

== Presidential elections ==
United States presidential election results for Alaska
Year	Republican		Democratic		Third party(ies)	
Year	No.	%	No.	%	No.	%
1960	30,953	50.94%	29,809	49.06%	0	0.00%
1964	22,930	34.09%	44,329	65.91%	0	0.00%
1968	37,600	45.28%	35,411	42.65%	10,024	12.07%
1972	55,349	58.13%	32,967	34.62%	6,903	7.25%
1976	71,555	57.90%	44,058	35.65%	7,961	6.44%
1980	86,112	54.35%	41,842	26.41%	30,491	19.24%
1984	138,377	66.65%	62,007	29.87%	7,221	3.48%
1988	119,251	59.59%	72,584	36.27%	8,281	4.14%
1992	102,000	39.46%	78,294	30.29%	78,212	30.26%
1996	122,746	50.80%	80,380	33.27%	38,494	15.93%
2000	167,398	58.62%	79,004	27.67%	39,158	13.71%
2004	190,889	61.07%	111,025	35.52%	10,684	3.42%
2008	193,841	59.42%	123,594	37.89%	8,762	2.69%
2012	164,676	54.80%	122,640	40.81%	13,179	4.39%
2016	163,387	51.28%	116,454	36.55%	38,767	12.17%
2020	189,951	52.83%	153,778	42.77%	15,801	4.39%
2024	184,458	54.54%	140,026	41.41%	13,693	4.05%

Alaskans have voted in United States presidential elections since 1960. With the exception of the candidacy of Barry Goldwater in 1964, the Republican Party has carried Alaska in every presidential election.

Vote in Alaska		National vote	
Year	Candidate	Year	Candidate
1960	Richard Nixon	1960	John F. Kennedy
1964	Lyndon B. Johnson	1964	Lyndon B. Johnson
1968	Richard Nixon	1968	Richard Nixon
1972	Richard Nixon	1972	Richard Nixon
1976	Gerald Ford	1976	Jimmy Carter
1980	Ronald Reagan	1980	Ronald Reagan
1984	Ronald Reagan	1984	Ronald Reagan
1988	George H. W. Bush	1988	George H. W. Bush
1992	George H. W. Bush	1992	Bill Clinton
1996	Bob Dole	1996	Bill Clinton
2000	George W. Bush	2000	George W. Bush
2004	George W. Bush	2004	George W. Bush
2008	John McCain	2008	Barack Obama
2012	Mitt Romney	2012	Barack Obama
2016	Donald Trump	2016	Donald Trump
2020	Donald Trump	2020	Joe Biden
2024	Donald Trump	2024	Donald Trump

== United States congressional delegation elections ==
=== United States Senate elections ===
Alaska has a Class II Senator (currently Dan Sullivan) and a Class III Senator (currently Lisa Murkowski). Alaska first elected Senators in 1956 under the "Alaska–Tennessee Plan." They had no vote in the Senate, but were sent to represent Alaska as if they were, to lobby for statehood, and to assume the office of senator should the situation arise. Alaska's first voting senators were elected in the 1958 election; it was a special election due to the former territory's pending admission as a state.

==== Class II Senate elections ====
- 1960 United States Senate election in Alaska
- 1966 United States Senate election in Alaska
- 1972 United States Senate election in Alaska
- 1978 United States Senate election in Alaska
- 1984 United States Senate election in Alaska
- 1990 United States Senate election in Alaska
- 1996 United States Senate election in Alaska
- 2002 United States Senate election in Alaska
- 2008 United States Senate election in Alaska
- 2014 United States Senate election in Alaska
- 2020 United States Senate election in Alaska
- 2026 United States Senate election in Alaska

==== Class III Senate elections ====
- 1962 United States Senate election in Alaska
- 1968 United States Senate election in Alaska
- 1974 United States Senate election in Alaska
- 1980 United States Senate election in Alaska
- 1986 United States Senate election in Alaska
- 1992 United States Senate election in Alaska
- 1998 United States Senate election in Alaska
- 2004 United States Senate election in Alaska
- 2010 United States Senate election in Alaska
- 2016 United States Senate election in Alaska
- 2022 United States Senate election in Alaska

=== United States House of Representatives elections ===
Alaska has had a single congressional district in the United States House of Representatives since statehood was granted in 1959.

- 1958 United States House of Representatives election in Alaska
- 1960 United States House of Representatives election in Alaska
- 1962 United States House of Representatives election in Alaska
- 1964 United States House of Representatives election in Alaska
- 1966 United States House of Representatives election in Alaska
- 1968 United States House of Representatives election in Alaska
- 1970 United States House of Representatives election in Alaska
- 1972 United States House of Representatives election in Alaska
- 1974 United States House of Representatives election in Alaska
- 1976 United States House of Representatives election in Alaska
- 1978 United States House of Representatives election in Alaska
- 1980 United States House of Representatives election in Alaska
- 1982 United States House of Representatives election in Alaska
- 1984 United States House of Representatives election in Alaska
- 1986 United States House of Representatives election in Alaska
- 1988 United States House of Representatives election in Alaska
- 1990 United States House of Representatives election in Alaska
- 1992 United States House of Representatives election in Alaska
- 1994 United States House of Representatives election in Alaska
- 1996 United States House of Representatives election in Alaska
- 1998 United States House of Representatives election in Alaska
- 2000 United States House of Representatives election in Alaska
- 2002 United States House of Representatives election in Alaska
- 2004 United States House of Representatives election in Alaska
- 2006 United States House of Representatives election in Alaska
- 2008 United States House of Representatives election in Alaska
- 2010 United States House of Representatives election in Alaska
- 2012 United States House of Representatives election in Alaska
- 2014 United States House of Representatives election in Alaska
- 2016 United States House of Representatives election in Alaska
- 2018 United States House of Representatives election in Alaska
- 2020 United States House of Representatives election in Alaska
- 2022 United States House of Representatives election in Alaska (Special)
- 2022 United States House of Representatives election in Alaska
- 2024 United States House of Representatives election in Alaska

== Gubernatorial elections ==
- 1958 Alaska gubernatorial election
- 1962 Alaska gubernatorial election
- 1966 Alaska gubernatorial election
- 1970 Alaska gubernatorial election
- 1974 Alaska gubernatorial election
- 1978 Alaska gubernatorial election
- 1982 Alaska gubernatorial election
- 1986 Alaska gubernatorial election
- 1990 Alaska gubernatorial election
- 1994 Alaska gubernatorial election
- 1998 Alaska gubernatorial election
- 2002 Alaska gubernatorial election
- 2006 Alaska gubernatorial election
- 2010 Alaska gubernatorial election
- 2014 Alaska gubernatorial election
- 2018 Alaska gubernatorial election
- 2022 Alaska gubernatorial election

=== Gubernatorial election results ===
Year	Democratic nominee			Republican nominee			Independent candidate			Alaskan Independence nominee			Libertarian nominee			Green nominee			Other candidate			Other candidate		
Year	Candidate	#	%	Candidate	#	%	Candidate	#	%	Candidate	#	%	Candidate	#	%	Candidate	#	%	Candidate	#	%	Candidate	#	%
1958	William A. Egan	29,189	59.61%	John Butrovich	19,299	39.41%	Mike Dollinter	480	0.98%	–			–			–			–			–		
1962	William A. Egan	29,627	52.27%	Mike Stepovich	27,054	47.73%	–			–			–			–			–			–		
1966	William A. Egan	32,065	48.37%	Wally Hickel	33,145	49.99%	John Grasse	1,084	1.64%	–			–			–			–			–		
1970	William A. Egan	42,309	52.38%	Keith H. Miller	37,264	46.13%	–			–			–			–			Ralph Anderson (American Independent)	1,206	1.49%	–		
1974	William A. Egan	45,553	47.37%	Jay Hammond	45,840	47.67%	–			Joe Vogler	4,770	4.96%	–			–			–			–		
1978	Chancy Croft	25,656	20.22%	Jay Hammond	49,580	39.07%	Tom Kelly	15,656	12.34%	Don Wright	2,463	1.94%	–			–			Wally Hickel (Republican/Write-in)	33,555	26.44%	–		
1982	Bill Sheffield	89,918	46.12%	Tom Fink	72,291	37.09%	–			Joe Vogler	3,235	1.66%	Dick Randolph	29,067	14.91%	–			–			–		
1986	Steve Cowper	84,943	47.31%	Arliss Sturgulewski	76,515	42.61%	–			Joe Vogler	10,013	5.58%	Mary Jane O'Brannon	1,050	0.58%	–			–			–		
1990	Tony Knowles	60,201	30.91%	Arliss Sturgulewski	50,991	26.18%	–			Wally Hickel	75,721	38.88%	–			Jim Sykes	6,563	3.37%	Michael O'Callaghan (The Political Party)	942	0.48%	–		
1994	Tony Knowles	87,693	41.08%	Jim Campbell	87,157	40.84%	–			Jack Coghill	27,838	13.04%	–			Jim Sykes	8,727	4.09%	Ralph Winterrowd (Patriot)	1,743	0.82%	–		
1998	Tony Knowles	112,879	51.27%	John Howard; Lindauer	39,331	17.86%	–			Sylvia Sullivan	4,238	1.92%	–			Desa Jacobsson	6,618	3.01%	Robin L. Taylor (Republican/Write-in)	40,209	18.26%	Ray Metcalfe (Republican Moderate)	13,540	6.15%
2002	Fran Ulmer	94,216	40.70%	Frank Murkowski	129,279	55.85%	–			Don Wright	2,185	0.94%	Billy Toien	1,109	0.48%	Diane E. Benson	2,926	1.26%	Raymond VinZant (Republican Moderate)	1,506	0.65%	–		
2006	Tony Knowles	97,238	40.97%	Sarah Palin	114,697	48.33%	Andrew Halcro	22,443	9.46%	Don Wright	1,285	0.54%	Billy Toien	682	0.29%	David Massie	593	0.25%	–			–		
2010	Ethan Berkowitz	96,519	37.67%	Sean Parnell	151,318	59.06%	–			Don Wright	4,775	1.86%	Billy Toien	2,682	1.05%	–			–			–		
2014	–			Sean Parnell	128,435	45.88%	Bill Walker	134,658	48.10%	–			Carolyn Clift	8,985	3.21%	–			J.R. Myers (Constitution)	6,987	2.50%	–		
2018	Mark Begich	125,739	44.41%	Mike Dunleavy	145,631	51.44%	Bill Walker	5,757	2.03%	–			Billy Toien	5,402	1.91%	–			–			–		
2022	Les Gara	63,851	24.21%	Mike Dunleavy	132,632	50.29%	Bill Walker	54,688	20.73%	–			–			–			Charlie Pierce (Republican)	11,817	4.48%	–		

== Alaska Legislature elections ==
Alaska Senators have terms of four years; half of them are elected every two years. Alaska Representatives have terms of two years; all of them are elected every two years. The state's redistricting process allows the power to shorten the terms of state senators should a redistricting action substantially alter their district.

- 1994 Alaska state elections
- 1996 Alaska state elections
- 1998 Alaska state elections
- 2000 Alaska state elections
- 2002 Alaska state elections
- 2004 Alaska state elections
- 2006 Alaska state elections
- 2008 Alaska state elections
- 2010 Alaska state elections
- 2012 Alaska state elections
- 2014 Alaska state elections
- 2016 Alaska state elections

== Municipal elections ==
Virtually all of the state's municipalities hold their general elections in early October, with the notable exception of Anchorage. North Pole for many years held their elections in November, in the process holding them on the same day as state elections on even-numbered years, but eventually abandoned that in favor of October elections. Anchorage switched from an early October election day to one in early April around 1992.

== Political parties ==
As of July 2026, there are three recognized political parties.

- Democratic Party (see also Alaska Democratic Party)
- Libertarian Party (see also Alaska Libertarian Party)
- Republican Party (see also Alaska Republican Party)

There are also several groups seeking recognized party status. To be officially recognized, these groups must have at least 5,000 registered voters affiliated with them.

Lawsuits launched by Joe Vogler and Jim Sykes, among other lawsuits, led the Alaska Legislature to eventually revamp and relax laws pertaining to party status and ballot access. The first instance of a minor party gaining recognition came in 1982, when the gubernatorial candidacy of Dick Randolph under the Libertarian Party was successful enough to meet the existing party recognition threshold. With the implementation of ranked-choice voting and nonpartisan primaries in the state, recognition no longer provides advantages for ballot access in non-presidential elections.

== See also ==
- 2026 Alaska elections
- Political party strength in Alaska
- Women's suffrage in Alaska
