= 2018 Alaska gubernatorial election =

- November 6, 2018
- Turnout: 49.8%
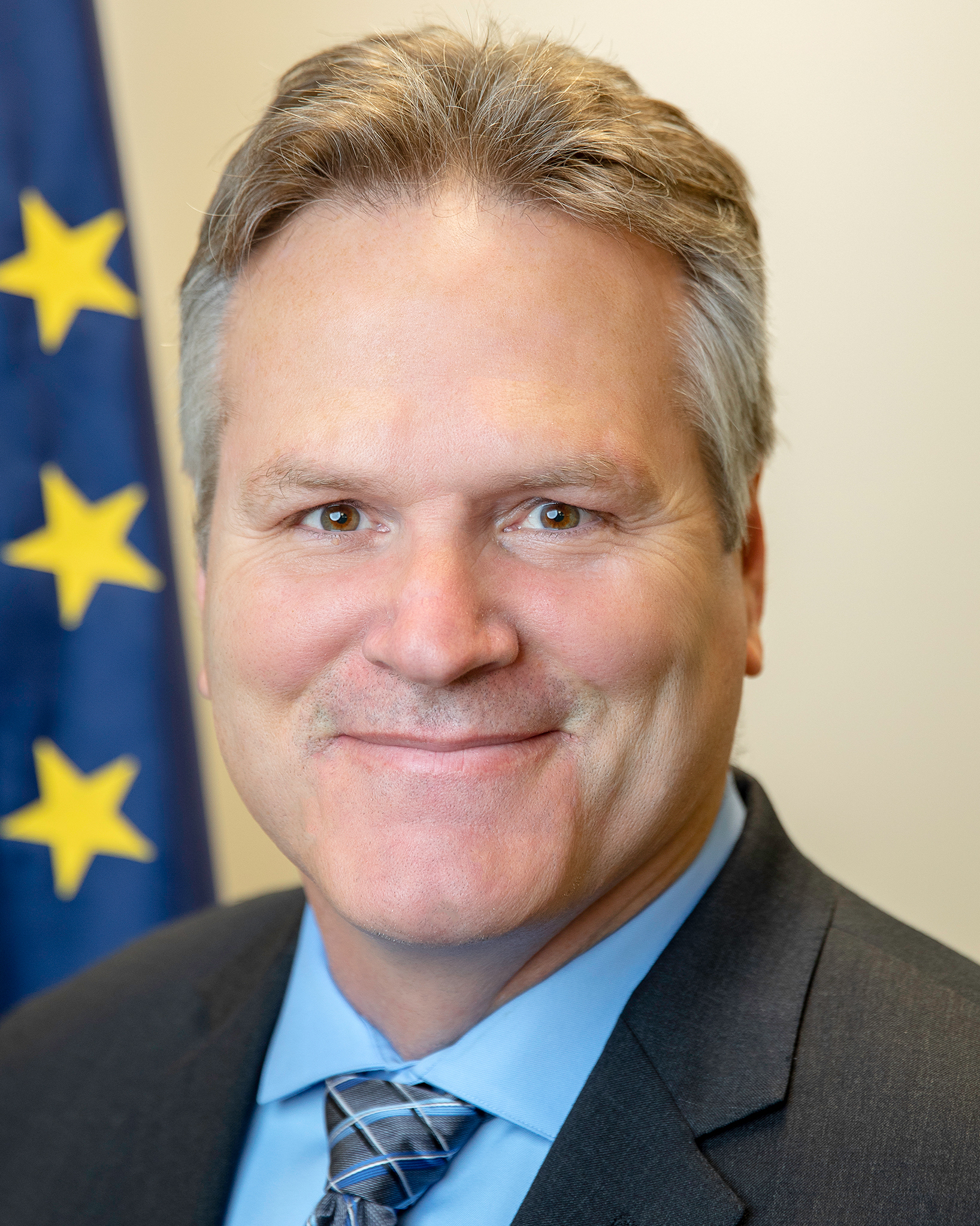

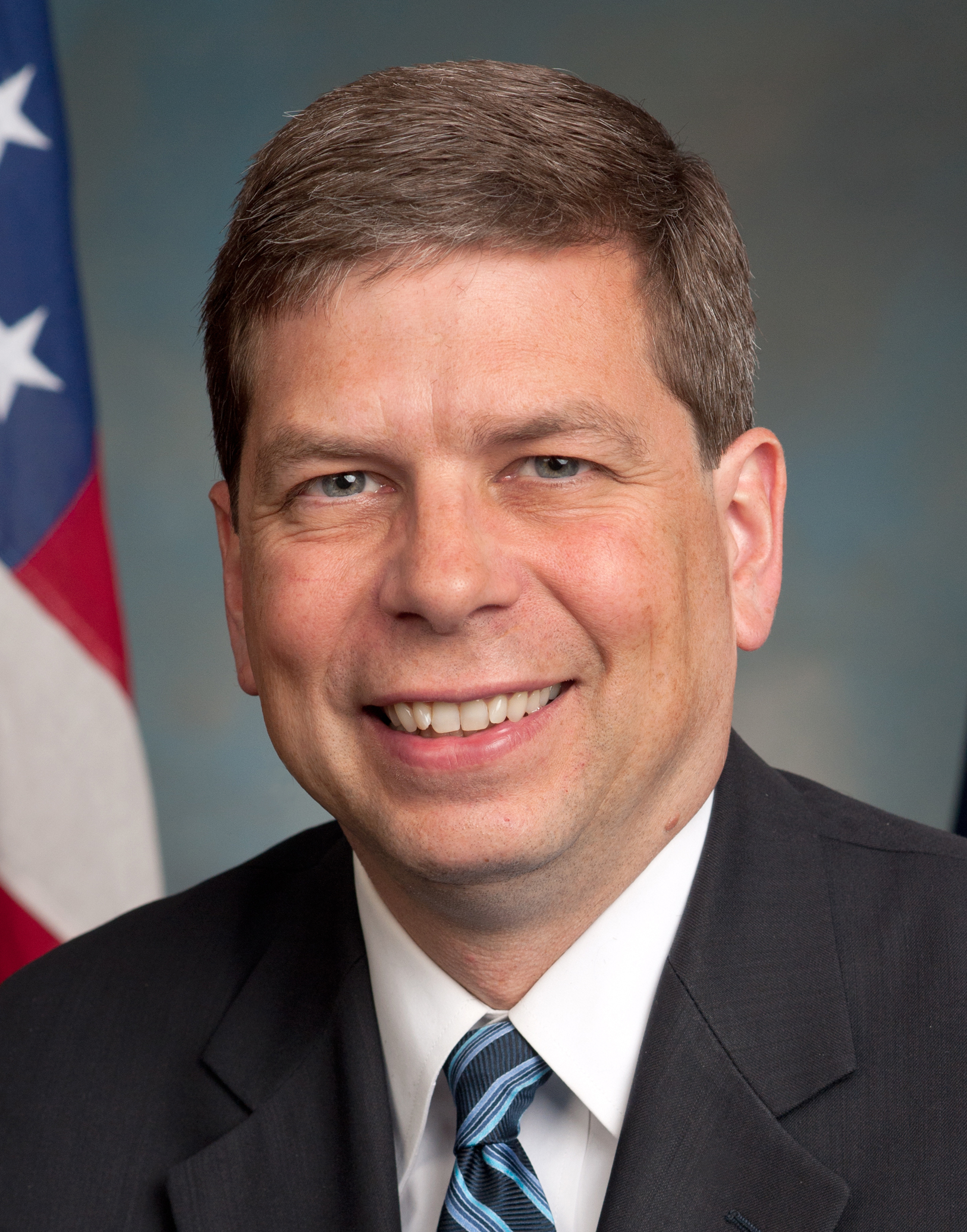
Nominee	Mike Dunleavy	Mark Begich
Party	Republican	Democratic
Running mate	Kevin Meyer	Debra Call
Popular vote	145,631	125,739
Percentage	51.44%	44.41%
- Dunleavy: 40–50% 50–60% 60–70% 70–80% 80–90% >90% Begich: 40–50% 50–60% 60–70% 70–80% 80–90% >90% Tie: 40–50%
Governor before election
Bill Walker
Independent
Elected Governor
Mike Dunleavy
Republican

The 2018 Alaska gubernatorial election took place on November 6, 2018, to elect the governor and lieutenant governor of Alaska. In the primaries for recognized political parties, candidates for governor and lieutenant governor run separately. The winners of each respective primary for governor and lieutenant governor then become a joint ticket in the general election for their political party. Incumbent Independent Governor Bill Walker was seeking re-election in what was originally a three-way race between Walker, Republican former Alaska state senator Mike Dunleavy, and Democratic former Alaska U.S. Senator Mark Begich. Despite Walker dropping out on October 19, 2018, and endorsing Begich, Dunleavy won in what was the only gubernatorial gain by a Republican candidate in 2018. Walker later unsuccessfully ran for governor of Alaska in 2022.

This was the only independent-held governorship up for election in a state that Donald Trump won in the 2016 presidential election.

== Independents ==
=== Governor ===
==== Withdrew ====
- Bill Walker (Independent), incumbent governor

=== Lieutenant governor ===
==== Withdrew ====
- Valerie Davidson (Independent), incumbent lieutenant governor since October 16
- Byron Mallott (Democratic), incumbent lieutenant governor until October 16

== Democratic–Libertarian–Independence primary ==
Candidates from the Alaska Democratic Party, Alaska Libertarian Party and Alaskan Independence Party appear on the same ballot, with the highest-placed candidate from each party receiving that party's nomination. In October 2017 the AKDP sued for the right to allow non-Democrats to compete for and win the Democratic nomination, which was ultimately decided in their favor in April 2018. This move was widely thought to benefit incumbent Gov. Bill Walker, to foreclose the possibility of a Democratic nominee splitting the vote with Walker against a Republican nominee. However, with the entry of former senator Mark Begich into the race, Walker withdrew from the Democratic primary and forged ahead with a fully independent bid for reelection.

=== Governor ===
==== Declared ====
- Mark Begich (Democratic), former U.S. senator
- William S. "Billy" Toien (Libertarian), Libertarian candidate for Alaska governor in 2010

==== Polling ====
Hypothetical polling

with Mark Begich

Poll source	Date(s) administered	Sample size	Margin of error	Mark Begich	Les Gara	Chris Tuck	Bill Wielechowski	Undecided
Harstad Strategic Research	March 22 – April 2, 2017	205	± 2.2%	42%	15%	3%	8%	32%
Harstad Strategic Research	March 22 – April 2, 2017	205	± 2.2%	–	25%	5%	19%	51%
Harstad Strategic Research	March 22 – April 2, 2017	205	± 2.2%	49%	–	5%	12%	34%
Harstad Strategic Research	March 22 – April 2, 2017	205	± 2.2%	43%	15%	–	8%	34%
Harstad Strategic Research	March 22 – April 2, 2017	205	± 2.2%	44%	19%	4%	–	32%

==== Results ====
Results by state house district: Begich—80–90% Begich—70–80% Begich—60–70%

Democratic–Libertarian–Independence primary results
Party	Candidate	Votes	%
Democratic	Mark Begich	33,451	85.3
Libertarian	William Toien	5,790	14.8
Total votes		39,241	100.0

=== Lieutenant governor ===
==== Declared ====
- Debra Call (Democratic), Cook Inlet Tribal Council Board of Directors representative

==== Withdrawn ====
- Edgar Blatchford (Democratic), former mayor of Seward

==== Results ====
Results by state house district: Call—80–90% Call—70–80% Call—60–70%

Democratic–Libertarian–Independence primary results
Party	Candidate	Votes	%
Democratic	Debra Call	34,291	100.0
Total votes		34,291	100.0

== Republican primary ==
=== Governor ===
==== Nominated ====
- Mike Dunleavy, educator and former state senator

==== Eliminated in primary ====
- Dorian Colbry
- Thomas A. "Tom" Gordon
- Gerald Heikes, perennial candidate
- Merica Hlatcu
- Michael Sheldon
- Mead Treadwell, former lieutenant governor

==== Withdrawn ====
- Mike Chenault, state representative and former Speaker of the Alaska House of Representatives
- Scott Hawkins, businessman

==== Declined ====
- Robert Gillam, businessman
- Loren Leman, former lieutenant governor
- Anna MacKinnon, state senator (endorsed Mike Dunleavy)
- Peter Micciche, state senator (running for re-election to state senate)
- Joe Miller, former magistrate judge and perennial candidate
- Frank Murkowski, former governor of Alaska and U.S. Senator
- Sean Parnell, former governor of Alaska (endorsed Mike Dunleavy)
- Ben Stevens, former president of the Alaska State Senate, son of former president pro tempore of the U.S. Senate, Solicitor of the Interior Department & U.S. Attorney Ted Stevens
- Dan Sullivan, former mayor of Anchorage and nominee for lieutenant governor in 2014 (endorsed Mike Dunleavy)
- Bill Walker, incumbent Independent governor (running for re-election as an independent)

==== Polling ====
Poll source	Date(s) administered	Sample size	Margin of error	Mike Dunleavy	Scott Hawkins	Mead Treadwell	Other	Undecided
Dittman Research (R-Dunleavy for Alaska)	June 5–7, 2018	400	± 4.9%	46%	7%	19%	3%	25%

Hypothetical polling

Poll source	Date(s) administered	Sample size	Margin of error	John Binkley	Mike Dunleavy	Peter Miccici	Joe Miller	Bill Walker	Other	Undecided
Harstad Strategic Research	March 22 – April 2, 2017	281	± 2.2%	7%	6%	4%	25%	19%	3%	36%
Harstad Strategic Research	March 22 – April 2, 2017	281	± 2.2%	9%	8%	6%	29%	–	4%	46%
Harstad Strategic Research	March 22 – April 2, 2017	281	± 2.2%	8%	10%	5%	–	25%	4%	48%
Harstad Strategic Research	March 22 – April 2, 2017	281	± 2.2%	–	–	–	33%	21%	–	46%

==== Results ====
Results by state house district: Dunleavy—80–90% Dunleavy—70–80% Dunleavy—60–70% Dunleavy—50–60% Dunleavy—40–50% Dunleavy—30–40% Treadwell—40–50%

Republican primary results
Party	Candidate	Votes	%
Republican	Mike Dunleavy	43,802	61.5
Republican	Mead Treadwell	22,780	32.0
Republican	Michael Sheldon	1,640	2.3
Republican	Merica Hlatcu	1,064	1.5
Republican	Thomas Gordon	884	1.4
Republican	Gerald Heikes	499	0.7
Republican	Darin Colbry	416	0.6
Total votes		71,195	100.0

=== Lieutenant governor ===
==== Declared ====
- Lynn Gattis, former state representative and candidate for the state senate in 2016
- Edie Grunwald, retired Air Force colonel and former human resources director for the Alaska National Guard
- Sharon Jackson, activist and former congressional staffer
- Kevin Meyer, state senator and former president of the Alaska Senate
- Gary Stevens, state senator
- Stephen Wright, Air Force veteran

==== Declined ====
- Glen Thompson, Ketchikan Gateway Borough Assemblyman
- David Wilson, state senator

==== Results ====
Results by state house district: Meyer—50–60% Meyer—40–50% Meyer—30–40% Meyer—<30% Grunwald—<30% Grunwald—30–40% Grunwald—40–50% Stevens—<30% Stevens—50–60% Jackson—<30%

Republican primary results
Party	Candidate	Votes	%
Republican	Kevin Meyer	23,838	35.8
Republican	Edie Grunwald	18,097	27.1
Republican	Gary Stevens	8,123	12.2
Republican	Lynn Gattis	6,156	10.4
Republican	Sharon Jackson	5,394	8.1
Republican	Stephen Wright	4,321	6.5
Total votes		66,671	100.0

== General election ==
=== Campaign ===
Independent candidate and incumbent governor Bill Walker announced on October 19 that he was suspending his campaign and endorsing Mark Begich, three days after Walker's running mate and incumbent lieutenant governor Byron Mallott resigned from office (and amid low polling numbers just three weeks before election day). However, Walker and Mallott still remained on the ballot, as the deadline to withdraw was September 4.

=== Debates ===
Dates	Location	Dunleavy	Begich	Link
October 25, 2018	Anchorage, Alaska	Participant	Participant	Full debate - C-SPAN

=== Predictions ===
Source	Ranking	As of
The Cook Political Report	Lean R (flip)	October 26, 2018
The Washington Post	Tossup	November 5, 2018
FiveThirtyEight	Lean R (flip)	November 5, 2018
Rothenberg Political Report	Tilt R (flip)	November 1, 2018
Sabato's Crystal Ball	Lean R (flip)	November 5, 2018
RealClearPolitics	Tossup	November 4, 2018
Daily Kos	Lean R (flip)	November 5, 2018
Fox News (Note: The Fox News Midterm Power Rankings uniquely does not contain a category for Safe/Solid races)	Tossup	November 5, 2018
Politico	Lean R (flip)	November 5, 2018
Governing	Tossup	November 5, 2018

=== Endorsements ===
Mark Begich (D)

Statewide and local politicians

- Tony Knowles, former governor of Alaska and former mayor of Anchorage
- Bill Walker, incumbent governor

Individuals

- Bella Hammond, former First Lady of Alaska

Labor unions

- Alaska AFL–CIO
- National Education Association – Alaska affiliate

Organizations

- The Alaska Center
- Alaskans Together for Equality
- Anchorage Police Department Employees Association
- Planned Parenthood Action Fund
Mike Dunleavy (R)

U.S. executive branch officials

- Donald Trump, 45th president of the United States

Federal politicians

- Lisa Murkowski, U.S. senator
- Dan S. Sullivan, U.S. senator
- Don Young, U.S. congressman

State and local politicians

- Anna MacKinnon, state senator
- Sean Parnell, former governor of Alaska
- Dick Randolph, former state representative
- Craig Richards, former Alaska attorney general
- Dan Sullivan, former Anchorage mayor
- Mead Treadwell, former lieutenant governor of Alaska

Individuals

- Joseph Ralston, former vice chairman of the Joint Chiefs of Staff
- Mao Tosi, former NFL Arizona Cardinals defensive back

Organizations

- Alaska Forestry Association
- Alaska Outdoor Council
- Alaska's Public Safety Employees Association
- National Rifle Association of America
- Sportsmen's Conservation Alliance

Alaska Native corporations

- Arctic Slope Regional Corporation
- Calista Corporation
Bill Walker (I) (withdrew) (endorsed Begich)

Organizations

- Alaska AFL–CIO
- The Centrist Project
- NEA-Alaska

=== Polling ===
with Bill Walker (campaign suspended), Mike Dunleavy, and Mark Begich

View source data.

Poll source	Date(s) administered	Sample size	Margin of error	Bill Walker (I)	Mike Dunleavy (R)	Mark Begich (D)	Billy Toien (L)	Other	Undecided
Alaska Survey Research	October 26–29, 2018	500	± 4.4%	8%	43%	42%	3%	–	4%
Alaska Survey Research	October 19–22, 2018	500	± 4.4%	5%	48%	44%	–	–	3%
Alaska Survey Research	October 12–14, 2018	500	± 4.4%	27%	43%	26%	–	–	4%
Public Policy Polling (D)	October 11–12, 2018	645	–	24%	43%	23%	–	–	9%
Alaska Survey Research	October 1–6, 2018	500	± 4.4%	27%	47%	23%	–	–	4%
Alaska Survey Research	September 21–25, 2018	500	± 4.4%	23%	44%	29%	–	–	4%
Harstad Strategic Research	August 13–16, 2018	602	± 4.0%	26%	36%	24%	–	2%	12%
Patinkin Research Strategies (I-Walker)	June 22–28, 2018	800	± 3.4%	28%	36%	22%	–	–	15%
Harstad Strategic Research (D)	June 21–26, 2018	602	± 4.0%	28%	32%	28%	–	–	12%
Alaska Survey Research	June 15–21, 2018	654	± 3.8%	23%	38%	33%	–	–	6%

with Mark Begich and Mike Dunleavy

Poll source	Date(s) administered	Sample size	Margin of error	Mark Begich (D)	Mike Dunleavy (R)	Undecided
Alaska Survey Research	October 12–14, 2018	500	± 4.4%	45%	52%	4%
Alaska Survey Research	October 1–6, 2018	500	± 4.4%	41%	55%	5%
Alaska Survey Research	September 21–25, 2018	500	± 4.4%	47%	50%	3%
Harstad Strategic Research	August 13–16, 2018	602	± 4.0%	46%	44%	–
Harstad Strategic Research (D)	June 21–26, 2018	602	± 4.0%	50%	41%	9%
Alaska Survey Research	March 25–29, 2018	761	± 3.6%	53%	42%	5%

Hypothetical polling

with Bill Walker and Mike Dunleavy

Poll source	Date(s) administered	Sample size	Margin of error	Bill Walker (I)	Mike Dunleavy (R)	Undecided
Alaska Survey Research	October 12–14, 2018	500	± 4.4%	45%	52%	2%
Alaska Survey Research	October 1–6, 2018	500	± 4.4%	43%	53%	4%
Alaska Survey Research	September 21–25, 2018	500	± 4.4%	41%	54%	5%
Harstad Strategic Research	August 13–16, 2018	602	± 4.0%	47%	43%	–
Harstad Strategic Research (D)	June 21–26, 2018	602	± 4.0%	49%	40%	11%
Alaska Survey Research	March 25–29, 2018	761	± 3.6%	51%	44%	5%
Dittman Research (R-Dunleavy for Alaska)	February 26 – March 4, 2018	800	± 3.4%	41%	47%	12%
Patinkin Research Strategies (I-Walker)	February 20–22, 2018	600	± 4.0%	36%	33%	31%

with Bill Walker and Mark Begich

Poll source	Date(s) administered	Sample size	Margin of error	Bill Walker (I)	Mark Begich (D)	Undecided
Alaska Survey Research	October 12–14, 2018	500	± 4.4%	43%	42%	16%
Alaska Survey Research	October 1–6, 2018	500	± 4.4%	42%	41%	18%
Alaska Survey Research	September 21–25, 2018	500	± 4.4%	40%	46%	15%

=== Results ===
2018 Alaska gubernatorial election
Party	Candidate	Votes	%	±%
Republican	Mike Dunleavy	145,631	51.44%	+5.56%
Democratic	Mark Begich	125,739	44.41%	+44.41%
Independent	Bill Walker (incumbent; withdrawn)	5,757	2.03%	−46.07%
Libertarian	William Toien	5,402	1.91%	−1.30%
Write-in		605	0.21%	−0.11%
Total votes		283,134	100.00%	N/A
Turnout		284,891	49.82%	
Registered electors		571,851		
Republican gain from Independent				

==== Boroughs and census areas that flipped from Independent to Republican ====
- Denali Borough (largest city: Healy)
- Fairbanks North Star (largest city: Fairbanks)
- Petersburg
- Valdez–Cordova Census Area (largest city: Valdez)

==== Boroughs and census areas that flipped from Independent to Democratic ====
- Aleutians West Census Area (largest city: Unalaska)
- Anchorage
- Bethel Census Area (largest city: Bethel)
- Kusilvak Census Area (largest city: Hooper Bay)
- Nome Census Area (largest city: Nome)
- Dilingham Census Area (largest city: Dilingham)
- Kodiak Island (largest city: Kodiak Island)
- Lake & Peninsula Borough (largest city: Newhalen)
- North Slope Borough (largest city: Utqiaġvik)
- Northwest Arctic Borough (largest city: Kotzebue)
- Prince of Wales–Hyder Census Area (largest city: Craig)
- Yukon–Koyukuk Census Area (largest city: Fort Yukon)
- Juneau
- Sitka
- Skagway
- Hoonah–Angoon Census Area (largest town: Hoonah)
- Haines Borough (largest census-designated place: Haines)
- Yakutat

==== Boroughs and census areas that flipped from Republican to Democratic ====
- Aleutians East Borough (largest city: Akutan)
- Bristol Bay Borough (largest city: Naknek)
