= 2016 United States House of Representatives election in Alaska =

- November 8, 2016
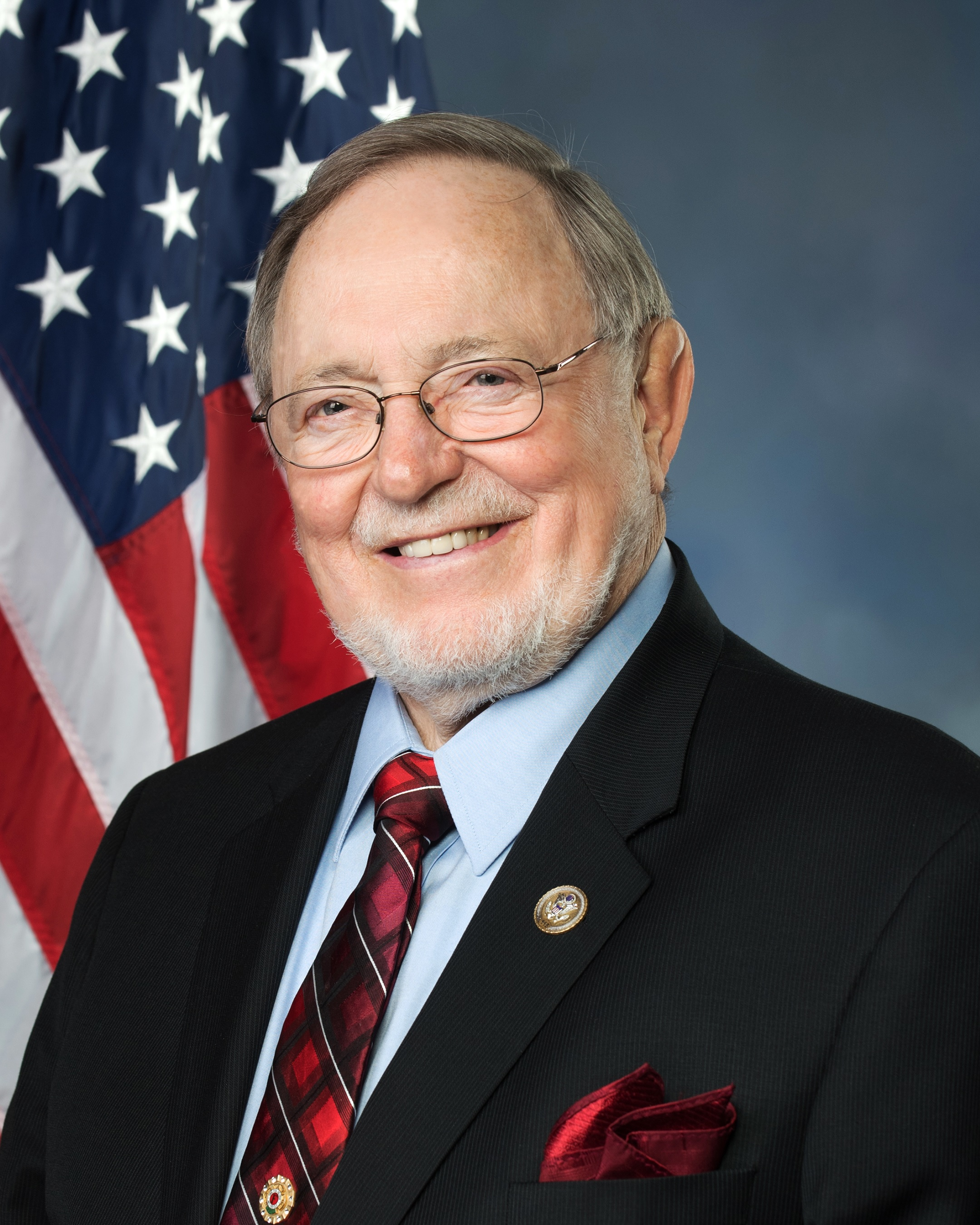

Nominee	Don Young	Steve Lindbeck	Jim McDermott
Party	Republican	Democratic	Libertarian
Popular vote	155,088	111,019	31,770
Percentage	50.32%	36.02%	10.31%
- Young: 40–50% 50–60% 60–70% Lindbeck: 40–50% 50–60%
Representative at-large before election
Don Young
Republican
Elected Representative at-large
Don Young
Republican

The 2016 United States House of Representatives election in Alaska was held on November 8, 2016, to elect the U.S. representative from Alaska's at-large congressional district, who will represent the state of Alaska in the 115th United States Congress. The election coincided with the 2016 U.S. presidential election, as well as other elections to the House of Representatives, elections in the United States Senate, and various state and local elections.

Incumbent Republican U.S. Representative Don Young was re-elected to a twenty-third term in office.

== Republican primary ==
=== Candidates ===
==== Declared ====
- Gerald Heikes, minister at Anchorage's nondenominational Bethel Chapel and perennial candidate
- Jesse Tingley
- Stephen Wright, US Air Force veteran
- Don Young, incumbent U.S. Representative

==== Declined ====
- Mike Dunleavy, state senator
- Lance Pruitt, state representative
- Sean Parnell, former governor of Alaska, and candidate for US House in 2008
- Joe Miller, former magistrate judge, nominee for the U.S. Senate in 2010 and candidate for the U.S. Senate in 2014
- Mead Treadwell, former lieutenant governor and candidate for the U.S. Senate in 2014

=== Results ===
Republican primary results
Party	Candidate	Votes	%
Republican	Don Young (incumbent)	38,998	71.5
Republican	Stephen Wright	10,189	18.7
Republican	Gerald Heikes	2,817	5.2
Republican	Jesse Tingley	2,524	4.6
Total votes		54,528	100.0

== Democratic–Libertarian–Independence primary ==
Candidates from the Alaska Democratic Party, Alaska Libertarian Party and Alaskan Independence Party appear on the same ballot, with the highest-placed candidate from each party receiving that party's nomination.

=== Democratic ===
==== Candidates ====
===== Declared =====
- William Hibler, former glaciologist with the University of Alaska Fairbanks
- Steve Lindbeck, former CEO of Alaska Public Media
- Lynette Moreno-Hinz, taxicab driver, candidate for lieutenant governor in 2010 and candidate for the State House in 2012

===== Declined =====
- Mark Begich, former U.S. Senator

=== Libertarian ===
==== Candidates ====
===== Declared =====
- Jim McDermott
- Jon Watts

=== Endorsements ===
Steve Lindbeck

Individuals

- Mark Begich, former U.S. Senator from Alaska
- Forrest Dunbar, member of the Anchorage Assembly and Democratic nominee for congress in 2014

Unions

- Alaska Public Employees Association (state union affiliated with the American Federation of Teachers and the AFL-CIO)
- Inlandboatmen's Union
- International Organization of Masters, Mates & Pilots

=== Results ===
Democratic–Libertarian–Independence primary results
Party	Candidate	Votes	%
Democratic	Steve Lindbeck	17,009	55.6
Democratic	Lynette Hinz	5,130	16.8
Libertarian	Jim McDermott	3,960	12.9
Democratic	William Hibler	2,918	9.5
Libertarian	Jon Watts	1,583	5.2
Total votes		30,543	100.0

== General election ==
=== Fundraising ===
Candidate	Raised	Spent	Cash on hand
Don Young (R)	$759,967	$716,219	$531,968
Steve Lindbeck (D)	$470,897	$153,365	$317,533
Jim McDermott (L)	$7,879	$7,879	$0

=== Predictions ===
Source	Ranking	As of
The Cook Political Report	Lean R	November 2, 2016
Daily Kos	Likely R	August 17, 2016
Roll Call	Safe R	August 17, 2016
Rothenberg Political Report	Safe R	July 14, 2016
Sabato's Crystal Ball	Likely R	August 10, 2016

=== Polling ===
Poll source	Date(s) administered	Sample size	Margin of error	Don Young (R)	Steve Lindbeck (D)	Other	Undecided
Alaska Survey Research	September 28–October 2, 2016	660	± 3.8%	45%	30%	16%	9%

=== Results ===
2016 Alaska's at-large congressional district
Party	Candidate	Votes	%	±%
Republican	Don Young (incumbent)	155,088	50.32%	−0.65%
Democratic	Steve Lindbeck	111,019	36.02%	−4.95%
Libertarian	Jim McDermott	31,770	10.31%	+2.70%
Independent	Bernie Souphanavong	9,093	2.95%	N/A
Write-in		1,228	0.40%	-0.06%
Total votes		308,198	100.00%	N/A
Republican hold				

==== Boroughs and Census Areas that flipped from Republican to Democratic ====
- Hoonah–Angoon Census Area (largest town: Hoonah)

==== Boroughs and Census Areas that flipped from Democratic to Republican ====
- Yakutat Borough
