= Alaska Libertarian Party =

State affiliate of the Libertarian Party

- Abbreviation: AKLP
- Chairperson: Nicholas Conrad
- Founded: 1974; 52 years ago
- Headquarters: Anchorage, Alaska
- Membership (2021): ▲6,789
- Ideology: Libertarianism
- Colors: a shade of Blue; Yellow
- Senate: 0 / 20
- House of Representatives: 0 / 40
- U.S. Senate: 0 / 2
- U.S. House of Representatives: 0 / 1
- Other elected officials: 0 (February 2025)

Website
- aklp.org

The Alaska Libertarian Party is the affiliate of the Libertarian Party (LP) in Alaska, headquartered in Anchorage.

It is the third-largest active (Note: The Alaskan Independence Party has more registered voters, but has only ran four candidates in the past decade and none in 2018) party in Alaska and has the highest percentage of registered Libertarians of any state. Since 2012 candidates running as Libertarians who have won the Democratic-Libertarian-Independence primary have always polled between 5% and 30% in at least one state or federal election every election.

Since Libertarian presidential candidates were on the ballot in 1976, Alaska has been a stronghold for Libertarians with it being their best-performing state in every election until 1992 and was in the top five except in 2004 and 2008. Many of the first offices held by Libertarians were in Alaska.

== History ==
The Alaskan Libertarian Party was founded shortly after the national party and grew to become a stronghold for the new party in the late seventies and throughout the eighties. In 1973 John Hospers and Tonie Nathan, the party's 1972 presidential and vice presidential nominees, spoke at the party's first state convention in Fairbanks to fifty members of the party. During the 1980 presidential election Ed Clark and Eugene McCarthy both appeared and spoke at their state convention.

Dick Randolph was elected to the Alaska House of Representatives as a Libertarian in the 1978 election. Randolph and Ken Fanning were elected to the state house in the 1980 election. Randolph received 15% of the popular vote as the party's nominee in the 1982 gubernatorial election, but the Libertarians lost both of their seats in the state house. He became the leader of the party, but left to run for the Republican nomination in the 1986 gubernatorial election. Republican Representative Fritz Pettyjohn said that Randolph was "the glue that held the party together" and his "departure will be a death blow". Andre Marrou was elected to the state house in 1984.

In 1980 Randolph led an effort to abolish the state income tax, which was successfully enacted in 1981. It was the only existing, broad-based individual income tax ever to be wholly eliminated. Governor Jay Hammond considered a veto but knew he would be overridden, finalizing what he later considered to be his greatest regret. There have been numerous attempts to reinstate the state income tax, in 1986, 1987, and 1989, but all have failed.

In the 1986 gubernatorial election the party leadership rejected the primary winner, Mary O'Brannon, and chose to launch a write-in campaign with the lieutenant governor candidate and runner up in the primary, Ed Hoch, as their candidate after failing to remove her with a lawsuit due to her failing to meet the residency requirements. O'Brannon defeated Hoch in terms of popular vote with 1,050 against his 107 write-in votes, but she had lost over 14% and 28,000 votes from Randolph's 1982 campaign. Marrou, the only sitting Libertarian in a state legislature at the time, lost reelection to the state house.

In 1988 the party was successful in placing three legislature candidates on the ballot after the state Supreme Court ruled the filing deadline to be unconstitutional. In 1992, the Alaskan affiliate along with the state's Constitution Party affiliate won a lawsuit against the Alaskan state Elections Division after both of their presidential ballot petitions were rejected.

From 2009 to 2010 the party was engaged in a voter registration drive to reach 9,786 registered voters due to a 2004 bill that changed the Alaskan party qualification rules so that a party using the registration test must have registration of 3% of the last vote cast resulting in mid-term years having higher voter registration amounts needed than presidential election years. From April to June 2009 party registration increased by over 1,000 voters.

In 2016, Cean Stevens withdrew after winning the state Libertarian primary to allow Republican Party member and Tea Party favorite nominee of the 2010 Senate election, Joe Miller her spot on the ticket in the 2016 Senate election and Miller was unanimously approved by the executive board to take Stevens' place. Miller came in second place and garnered nearly 30% of the vote, the highest percentage ever received by a Libertarian Senate candidate, but did not beat the total vote record established in 2002 Massachusetts Senate election by Michael Cloud.

== Current officials ==
- Alaska Public Office Commissioner Robert Clift (2017–present) – Appointed to a five-year term by Bill Walker
- Alaska Public Office Commissioner Adam Schwemley (2017–present) – Appointed to a five-year term by Bill Walker
- Ketchikan Gateway Borough School Board member Stephen Bradford (2021–present).

== Former officials ==
- Bethel City councilor Richard Robb (2017–2018)
- Cordova City councilor Ken Jones (2017–2021)
- State Representative Dick Randolph (1978–1982) – First person to be elected to partisan office under the banner of the Libertarian Party
- State Representative Ken Fanning (1980–1982) – Second person to be elected to partisan office under the banner of the Libertarian Party
- State Representative Andre Marrou (1985–1987) – 1988 vice presidential nominee and 1992 presidential nominee
- Juneau City councilor Sara Chambers (2006–2010)

== Chairman ==
- Terrence Shanigan (2016–2016)
- Jon Watts (2016–2022)
- Alex Coker (2022–2024)
- Meghan Trupp (2024–2024)
- Nicholas Conrad (2024–present)

== Electoral performance ==
=== Presidential ===
Year	Presidential nominee	Votes	Change
1972	John Hospers (write-in)	45 (0.1%)	Steady
1976	Roger MacBride	6,785 (5.5%)	▲5.4%
1980	Ed Clark	18,479 (11.7%)	▲6.2%
1984	David Bergland	6,378 (3.1%)	▼8.6%
1988	Ron Paul	5,484 (2.7%)	▼0.3%
1992	Andre Marrou	1,378 (0.5%)	▼2.2%
1996	Harry Browne	2,276 (0.9%)	▲0.4%
2000	Harry Browne	2,636 (0.9%)	▼0.0%
2004	Michael Badnarik	1,675 (0.5%)	▼0.4%
2008	Bob Barr	1,589 (0.5%)	▼0.1%
2012	Gary Johnson	7,392 (2.5%)	▲2.0%
2016	Gary Johnson	18,725 (5.9%)	▲3.4%
2020	Jo Jorgensen	8,897 (2.5%)	▼3.4%
2024	Chase Oliver	3,040 (0.9%)	▼2.3%

=== House ===
Year	House nominee	Votes	Change
1986	Betty Breck	4,182 (2.3%)	Steady
1988	None	None	▼2.3%
1998	None	None	Steady
2000	Len Karpinski	4,802 (1.8%)	▲1.8%
2002	Rob Clift	3,797 (1.7%)	▲0.1%
2004	Alvin A. Anders	7,157 (2.4%)	▲0.7%
2006	Alexander Crawford	4,029 (1.7%)	▼0.7%
2008	None	None	▼1.7%
2010	None	None	Steady
2012	Jim McDermott	15,028 (5.2%)	▲5.2%
2014	Jim McDermott	21,290 (7.6%)	▲2.4%
2016	Jim McDermott	31,770 (10.3%)	▲2.7%
2018	None	None	▼10.3%
2020	None	None	Steady
2022	Chris Bye	4,570 (1.7%)	▲1.7%

=== Senate Class II ===
Year	Senate nominee	Votes	Change
2002	Leonard Karpinski	2,354 (1.0%)	Steady
2008	Fredrick Haase	2,483 (0.8%)	▼0.3%
2014	Mark Fish	10,512 (3.7%)	▲1.9%
2020	None	None	▼3.7%

=== Senate Class III ===
Year	Senate nominee	Votes	Change
1986	Chuck House	3,161 (1.8%)	Steady
1992	None	None	▼1.8%
1998	Scott A. Kohlhaas	5,046 (2.3%)	▲2.3%
2004	Scott A. Kohlhaas	1,240 (0.4%)	▼1.9%
2010	David Haase	1,459 (0.6%)	▲0.2%
2016	Joe Miller	90,825 (29.2%)	▲28.6%

=== Gubernatorial ===
Year	Gubernatorial nominee	Votes	Change
1982	Dick Randolph	29,067 (14.9%)	Steady
1986	Mary Jane O'Brannon (Note: The party leadership rejected O'Brannon and ran a write-in campaign with Ed Hoch as their candidate)	1,050 (0.6%) (Note: Hoch: 107 (0.1%) ▼14.9%)	▼14.3%
1990	None	None	▼0.6%
1994	None	None	Steady
1998	None	None	Steady
2002	William Toien	1,109 (0.5%)	▲0.5%
2006	William Toien	682 (0.3%)	▼0.2%
2010	William Toien	2,682 (1.1%)	▲0.8%
2014	Carolyn Clift	8,985 (3.2%)	▲2.2%
2018	William Toien	5,402 (1.9%)	▼1.3%

== Voter registration ==
The stagnate registration rate is due to the fact that the Democratic-Libertarian-Independence primary is open which allows any member of either party to vote for a candidate.

Year	RV.	%	Change
2002	7,235	(1.6%)	Steady
2003	7,235	(1.6%)	Steady
2004	7,331	(1.6%)	▲0.0%
2005	6,932	(1.5%)	▼0.1%
2006 (Note: Listed as political group)	9,400	(2.0%)	▲0.6%
2007	8,587	(1.8%)	▼0.2%
2008	8,117	(1.7%)	▼0.1%
2009	6,742	(1.3%)	▼0.4%
2010	9,280	(1.9%)	▲0.6%
2011	8,804	(1.8%)	▼0.1%
2012	8,051	(1.6%)	▼0.1%
2013	7,687	(1.5%)	▼0.1%
2014	7,523	(1.6%)	▲0.1%
2015	7,176	(1.4%)	▼0.2%
2016	7,477	(1.5%)	▲0.1%
2017	7,599	(1.4%)	▼0.0%
2018	7,579	(1.4%)	Steady
2019 (Note: Listed as political group)	7,251	(1.3%)	▼0.2%

== See also ==
- List of state parties of the Libertarian Party (United States)
