= 2014 Alaska gubernatorial election =

- November 4, 2014
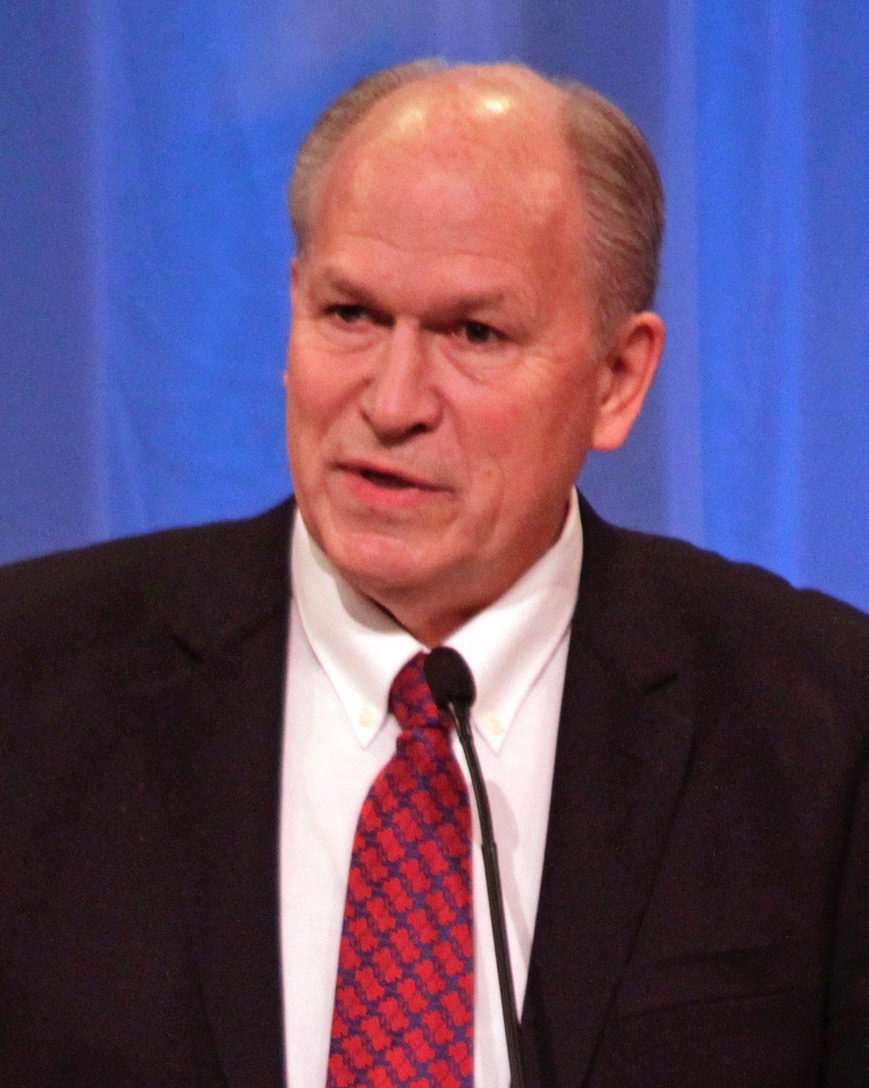

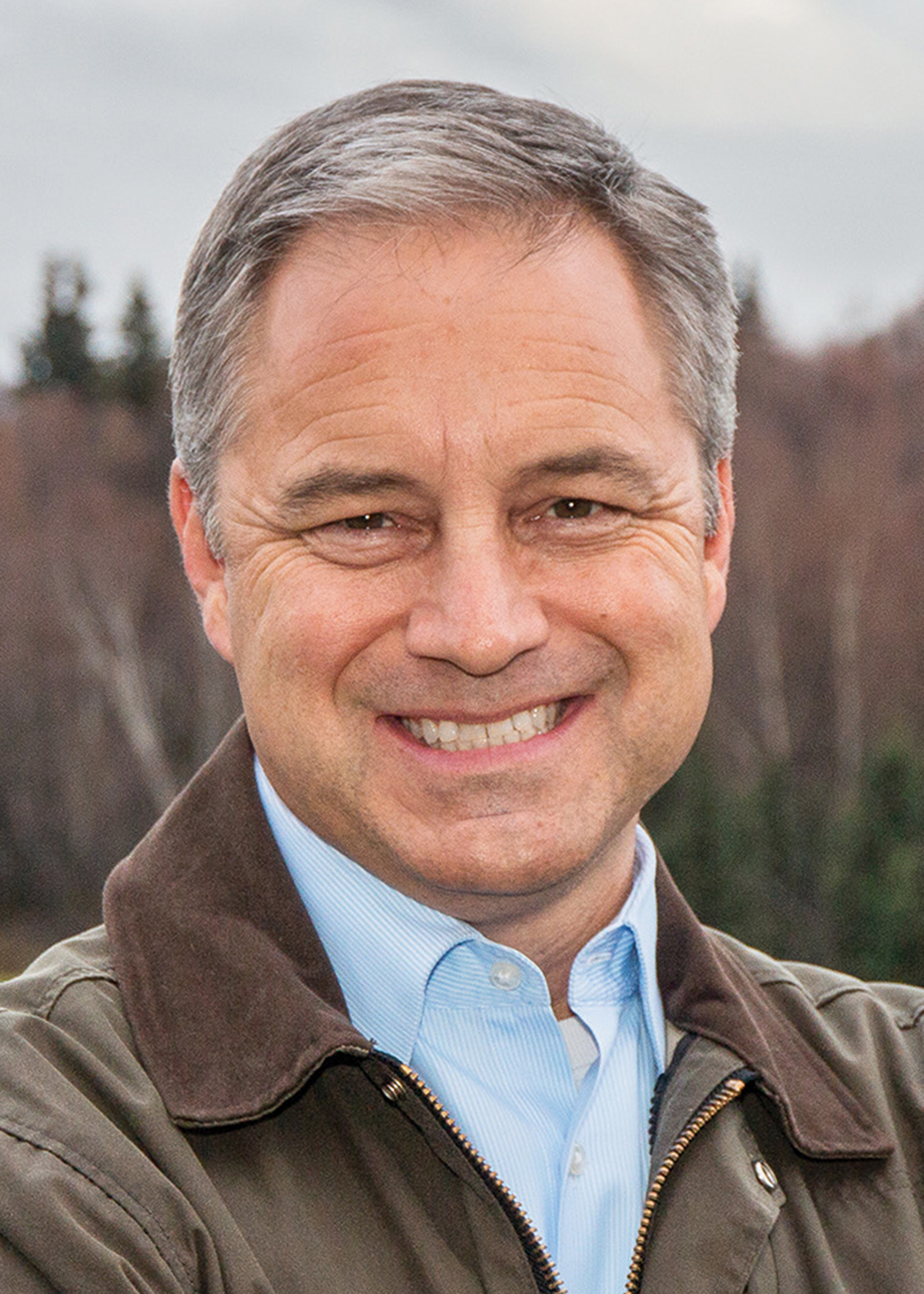
Nominee	Bill Walker	Sean Parnell
Party	Independent	Republican
Alliance	Democratic
Running mate	Byron Mallott	Dan Sullivan
Popular vote	134,658	128,435
Percentage	48.10%	45.88%
- Walker: 40–50% 50–60% 60–70% 70–80% Parnell: 40–50% 50–60% 60–70%
Governor before election
Sean Parnell
Republican
Elected Governor
Bill Walker
Independent

The 2014 Alaska gubernatorial election took place on November 4, 2014, to elect the governor and lieutenant governor of Alaska, concurrently with the election of Alaska's Class II U.S. Senate seat, as well as other elections to the United States Senate in other states and elections to the United States House of Representatives and various state and local elections.

Incumbent Republican governor Sean Parnell ran for re-election to a second full term in office, but incumbent lieutenant governor Mead Treadwell instead chose to run for the U.S. Senate. Primary elections were held on August 19, 2014, to determine party nominees for the office, with separate primaries held for governor and lieutenant governor and the winners running together on the same ticket.

Parnell was renominated; his running mate was Anchorage Mayor Dan Sullivan. The Democrats nominated businessman and former executive director of the Alaska Permanent Fund Byron Mallott, whose running mate was State Senator Hollis French. Also running as an independent was former Republican mayor of Valdez Bill Walker, whose running mate was Craig Fleener, the former deputy commissioner of the Alaska Department of Fish and Game.

On September 2, 2014, Walker and Mallott merged their campaigns to appear on the November ballot as a single independent ticket, which the Alaska Democratic Party endorsed. On this ticket, Walker ran for governor with Mallott as his running mate. Both candidates' former running mates withdrew. Parnell was considered vulnerable, as reflected in his low approval ratings. The consensus among The Cook Political Report, Governing, The Rothenberg Political Report, Sabato's Crystal Ball, Daily Kos Elections, and others was that the contest was a tossup. Former Republican governor Sarah Palin, who had praised Parnell as her successor when she resigned in 2009, endorsed Walker and Mallott, taking issue with Parnell's tax cuts for the oil and gas industry.

On November 7, Walker and Mallott held a 3,165-vote lead, which on November 11 had grown to 4,004 out of some 244,000 votes cast, or 1.6%. Walker began preparing for a transition but the race remained officially uncalled and Parnell refused to concede. On November 14, after Walker and Mallott extended their lead to 4,634 votes, multiple media outlets called the race. Parnell conceded the following day. His loss – coupled with Democrat Mark Begich's defeat in the U.S. Senate election – marked just the fifth time in the last 50 years in which an incumbent governor and senator from different political parties were defeated in the same state in the same election cycle. (Note: The others were 1990 in Minnesota, 1982 in Nevada, and 1978 in Massachusetts and New Hampshire.) Walker, who was born in the state (Fairbanks, Alaska Terriotry), became only the second Governor of Alaska to be born in Alaska after William A. Egan, Alaska's first governor who was born in Valdez, Alaska Territory.

== Republican primary ==
=== Governor ===
==== Candidates ====
===== Declared =====
- Gerald L. "Tap" Heikes, minister, candidate for governor in 2006 and 2010 and candidate for the U.S. Senate in 2008
- Russ Millette, former chairman-elect of the Alaska Republican Party
- Sean Parnell, incumbent governor
- Brad Snowden, candidate for governor in 2002

===== Withdrew =====
- Bill Walker, former mayor of Valdez and candidate for governor in 2010 (ran as an independent)

==== Polling ====
Hypothetical polling

Poll source	Date(s) administered	Sample size	Margin of error	Sean Parnell	Bill Walker	Undecided
Public Policy Polling	July 25–28, 2013	507	± 4.4%	60%	22%	18%

==== Results ====
Republican primary results
Party	Candidate	Votes	%
Republican	Sean Parnell (incumbent)	80,903	75.86
Republican	Russ Millette	11,296	10.59
Republican	Brad Snowden	10,594	9.93
Republican	Gerald L. "Tap" Heikes	3,855	3.61
Total votes		106,648	100

=== Lieutenant governor ===
==== Candidates ====
===== Declared =====
- Dan Sullivan, Mayor of Anchorage
- Kelly Wolf, Kenai Peninsula Borough Assemblyman and former state representative

===== Withdrew =====
- Lesil McGuire, state senator

==== Results ====
Republican primary results
Party	Candidate	Votes	%
Republican	Dan Sullivan	74,758	70.70
Republican	Kelly Wolf	30,985	29.30
Total votes		105,743	100

== Democratic–Libertarian–Independence primary ==
Candidates from the Alaska Democratic Party, Alaska Libertarian Party and Alaskan Independence Party appear on the same ballot, with the highest-placed candidate from each party receiving that party's nomination.

=== Governor ===
==== Democratic candidates ====
===== Declared =====
- Byron Mallott, businessman, former mayor of Juneau, former president of the Alaska Federation of Natives and former executive director of the Alaska Permanent Fund
- Phil Stoddard, candidate for the U.S. Senate in 1984 and candidate for governor in 1986

===== Withdrew =====
- Hollis French, state senator and candidate for governor in 2010 (running for lieutenant governor)

===== Declined =====
- Ethan Berkowitz, former Minority Leader of the Alaska House of Representatives, nominee for lieutenant governor in 2006, for Congress in 2008 and governor in 2010
- Les Gara, state representative
- Scott McAdams, former mayor of Sitka and nominee for the U.S. Senate in 2010
- Bill Wielechowski, state senator

==== Libertarian candidates ====
===== Declared =====
- Carolyn Clift, treasurer of the Alaska Libertarian Party

==== Results ====
Democratic–Libertarian–Independence primary results
Party	Candidate	Votes	%
Democratic	Byron Mallott	42,327	66.89
Democratic	Phil Stoddard	10,514	16.62
Libertarian	Carolyn Clift	10,436	16.49
Total votes		63,277	100

=== Lieutenant governor ===
==== Democratic candidates ====
===== Declared =====
- Hollis French, state senator and candidate for governor in 2010
- Bob Williams, teacher

==== Libertarian candidates ====
===== Declared =====
- Andrew C. Lee, gold miner

==== Results ====
Democratic–Libertarian–Independence primary results
Party	Candidate	Votes	%
Democratic	Hollis French	40,271	62.08
Democratic	Bob Williams	16,358	25.22
Libertarian	Andrew C. Lee	8,238	12.70
Total votes		64,867	100

== Others ==
=== Constitution Party ===
- J. R. Myers, founder and chairman of the Alaska Constitution Party

- Running mate: Maria Rensel

=== Independent ===
- Bill Walker, former mayor of Valdez and Republican candidate for governor in 2010

- Running mate: Byron Mallott, businessman, former mayor of Juneau, former president of the Alaska Federation of Natives and former executive director of the Alaska Permanent Fund
- Former running mate: Craig Fleener, former deputy commissioner of the Alaska Department of Fish and Game

== General election ==
=== Campaign ===
Parnell drew criticism during his re-election campaign over his support of billions in tax reductions for the petrochemical industry as well an exploding scandal featuring five years of alleged cover ups with regard to rampant sexual abuse, cronyism, corruption and whistleblower suppression, in the Alaska National Guard.

In October 2014, former Alaska Governor Sarah Palin endorsed Walker and Mallott. The endorsement was prompted by Parnell's oil and gas industry tax cuts, which dismantled her administration's "Alaska's Clear and Equitable Share" (ACES) plan. She had previously supported a referendum to repeal the tax cuts, which was narrowly defeated in August 2014. Walker and Mallott made the repeal of the tax cuts a centerpiece of their campaign.

=== Debates ===
- Complete video of debate, October 1, 2014 - C-SPAN

=== Predictions ===
Source	Ranking	As of
The Cook Political Report	Tossup	November 3, 2014
Sabato's Crystal Ball	Lean I (flip)	November 3, 2014
Rothenberg Political Report	Tossup	November 3, 2014
Real Clear Politics	Tossup	November 3, 2014

=== Polling ===
Poll source	Date(s) administered	Sample size	Margin of error	Sean Parnell (R)	Byron Mallott (D)	Bill Walker (I)	Other	Undecided
Public Policy Polling	November 1–2, 2014	1,052	± 3%	45%	—	46%	4%	5%
Public Policy Polling	November 1–2, 2014	1,052	± 3%	47%	—	48%	—	6%
Rasmussen Reports	October 27–30, 2014	887	± 4%	43%	—	50%	—	7%
CBS News/NYT/YouGov	October 16–23, 2014	561	± 9%	42%	—	39%	0%	20%
Hellenthal & Associates	October 15–21, 2014	403	± 4.88%	44%	—	43%	5%	9%
Rasmussen Reports	October 8–12, 2014	700	± 4%	41%	—	50%	2%	7%
Fox News	October 4–7, 2014	706	± 3.5%	42%	—	37%	8%	13%
CNN/ORC	October 1–6, 2014	704 LV	± 3.5%	45%	—	51%	—	3%
CNN/ORC	October 1–6, 2014	875 RV	± 3.4%	46%	—	49%	1%	5%
Hickman Analytics	September 26 – October 2, 2014	400	± 4.9%	46%	—	38%	7%	10%
CBS News/NYT/YouGov	September 20 – October 1, 2014	593	± 5%	40%	—	45%	1%	14%
Rasmussen Reports	September 23–24, 2014	713	± 4%	42%	—	47%	5%	6%
Public Policy Polling	September 18–21, 2014	880	± 3.3%	41%	—	42%	5%	13%
Public Policy Polling	September 18–21, 2014	880	± 3.3%	41%	—	45%	—	14%
Hays Research/AFL-CIO	September 13–14, 2014	500	± 4.38%	30%	—	37%	33%	
Hays Research*	August 20–22, 2014	474	± 4.5%	40%	—	43%	—	15%
Rasmussen Reports	August 20–21, 2014	750	± 4%	47%	36%	—	11%	6%
Public Policy Polling	July 31 – August 1, 2014	673	± 3.8%	37%	22%	20%	5%	16%
Public Policy Polling	July 31 – August 1, 2014	673	± 3.8%	48%	37%	—	—	14%
Public Policy Polling	July 31 – August 1, 2014	673	± 3.8%	41%	—	40%	—	19%
CBS News/NYT/YouGov	July 5–24, 2014	450	± 5.2%	55%	29%	—	6%	8%
Public Policy Polling	May 8–11, 2014	582	± 4.1%	37%	27%	17%	4%	15%
Public Policy Polling	January 30 – February 1, 2014	850	± 3.4%	41%	25%	16%	3%	15%

- * Internal poll for Bill Walker campaign
Hypothetical polling

Poll source	Date(s) administered	Sample size	Margin of error	Sean Parnell (R)	Ethan Berkowitz (D)	Undecided
Public Policy Polling	July 25–28, 2013	890	± 3.3%	51%	38%	12%
Public Policy Polling	February 4–5, 2013	1,129	± 2.9%	50%	41%	9%

Poll source	Date(s) administered	Sample size	Margin of error	Sean Parnell (R)	Hollis French (D)	Undecided
Public Policy Polling	July 25–28, 2013	890	± 3.3%	54%	33%	13%

Poll source	Date(s) administered	Sample size	Margin of error	Sean Parnell (R)	Les Gara (D)	Undecided
Public Policy Polling	July 25–28, 2013	890	± 3.3%	53%	33%	14%

Poll source	Date(s) administered	Sample size	Margin of error	Sean Parnell (R)	Scott McAdams (D)	Undecided
Public Policy Polling	February 4–5, 2013	1,129	± 2.9%	52%	34%	15%

Poll source	Date(s) administered	Sample size	Margin of error	Sean Parnell (R)	Mike Navarre (D)	Undecided
Public Policy Polling	February 4–5, 2013	1,129	± 2.9%	51%	29%	20%

Poll source	Date(s) administered	Sample size	Margin of error	Sean Parnell (R)	Joe Paskvan (D)	Undecided
Public Policy Polling	February 4–5, 2013	1,129	± 2.9%	51%	25%	24%

Poll source	Date(s) administered	Sample size	Margin of error	Sean Parnell (R)	Bill Wielechowski (D)	Undecided
Public Policy Polling	July 25–28, 2013	890	± 3.3%	52%	33%	15%

=== Results ===
2014 Alaska gubernatorial election
Party	Candidate	Votes	%	±%
Independent	Bill Walker	134,658	48.10%	+48.10%
Republican	Sean Parnell (incumbent)	128,435	45.88%	−13.18%
Libertarian	Carolyn Clift	8,985	3.21%	+2.16%
Constitution	J. R. Myers	6,987	2.50%	N/A
Write-in		893	0.32%	-0.04%
Total votes		279,958	100.00%	N/A
Independent gain from Republican				

==== Boroughs and census areas that flipped from Republican to Independent ====
- Denali Borough (largest city: Healy)
- Fairbanks North Star (largest city: Fairbanks)
- Petersburg
- Valdez–Cordova Census Area (largest city: Valdez)
- Aleutians West Census Area (largest city: Unalaska)
- Anchorage
- Bethel Census Area (largest city: Bethel)
- Kusilvak Census Area (largest city: Hooper Bay)
- Haines Borough (largest census-designated place: Haines)
- Kodiak Island (largest city: Kodiak Island)
- Lake & Peninsula Borough (largest city: Newhalen)
- North Slope Borough (largest city: Utqiaġvik)
- Prince of Wales–Hyder Census Area (largest city: Craig)
- Yukon–Koyukuk Census Area (largest city: Fort Yukon)
- Juneau

==== Boroughs and census areas that flipped from Democratic to Independent ====
- Nome Census Area (largest city: Nome)
- Dilingham Census Area (largest city: Dilingham)
- Northwest Arctic Borough (largest city: Kotzebue)
- Sitka
- Skagway
- Hoonah–Angoon Census Area (largest town: Hoonah)
- Yakutat

== See also ==
- 2014 United States elections
- 2014 United States gubernatorial elections

Elections in Alaska:

- 2014 United States House of Representatives election in Alaska
- 2014 United States Senate election in Alaska
