= Robert Gillam =

American investor (1946–2018)

- Born: July 7, 1946; Fairbanks, Alaska, U.S.
- Died: September 12, 2018 (aged 72); Anchorage, Alaska, U.S.
- Education: Wharton School of the University of Pennsylvania; UCLA Anderson School of Management
- Occupation: Investor
- Political party: Republican
- Spouse: Mary Lou Couch
- Children: 5

Robert Byron Gillam (July 7, 1946 – September 12, 2018) was an American investor. He was the founder and chairman of McKinley Capital Management, an asset management firm, until his death in 2018.

== Early life ==
Robert Gillam graduated from the Wharton School of the University of Pennsylvania in 1968. He received a master of business administration degree from the UCLA Anderson School of Management in 1969.

== Career ==
Gillam worked for Foster & Marshall, a financial firm, until it was acquired by American Express in 1982. He worked for Boettcher and Company from 1982 to 1985.

Gillam was the founder of McKinley Capital Management, an asset management firm. He served as its chairman. As of 2015, it had US$7 billion of assets under management.

His son Rob Gillam took over as CEO of McKinley after his death in 2018.

== Political activity ==
Gillam was a Republican. After the 2016 presidential election, he was regarded as a contender to be secretary of the interior under Donald Trump, though Ryan Zinke was ultimately chosen for the position. He was also considered a potential candidate for governor of Alaska in 2018, but he did not run.

== Personal life ==
Gillam resided in Anchorage, Alaska, near Campbell Lake. He spent $30 million opposing the proposed Pebble Mine, which would have been close to his Lake Clark fishing lodge. He was married to the former Mary Lou Couch, and had five children.

Gillam died at Providence Alaska Medical Center in Anchorage on September 12, 2018, aged 72, from complications of a stroke he had the day prior.
