= 2006 United States House of Representatives election in Alaska =

- November 7, 2006
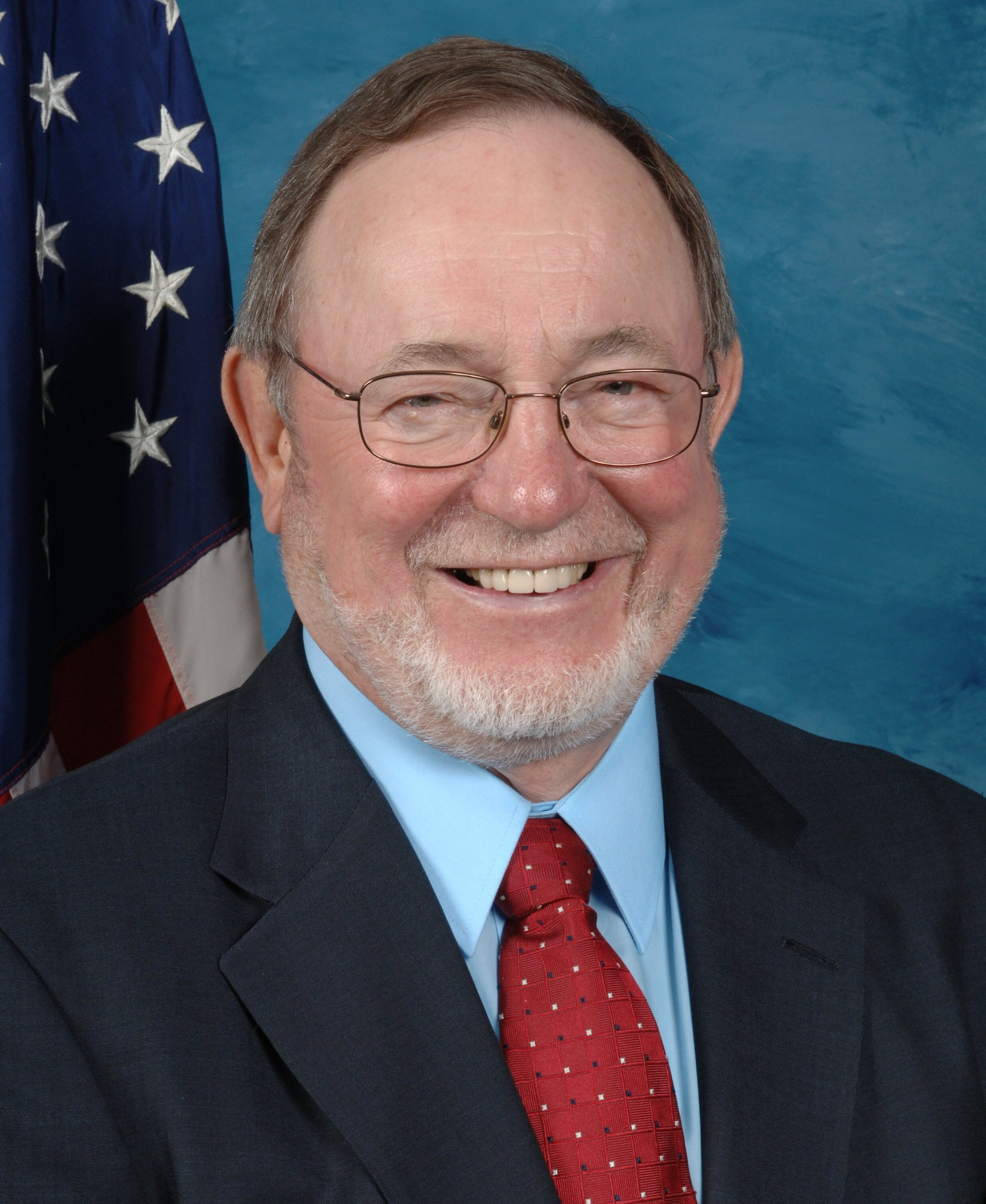

Nominee	Don Young	Diane E. Benson
Party	Republican	Democratic
Popular vote	132,743	93,879
Percentage	56.57%	40.01%
- Young: 40–50% 50–60% 60–70% 70–80% Benson: 40–50% 50–60% 60–70%
Representative at-large before election
Don Young
Republican
Elected Representative at-large
Don Young
Republican

The 2006 United States House of Representatives election in Alaska was held on Tuesday, November 7, 2006. The term of the state's sole Representative to the United States House of Representatives expired on January 3, 2007. The winning candidate would serve a two-year term from January 3, 2007, to January 3, 2009. The primary elections were held on August 22, 2006.

== Combined primary ==
=== Candidates ===
- Diane E. Benson (D), 2002 Green Party nominee for Governor
- Alexander Crawford (L)
- Sol L. Gerstenfeld (L)
- Todd Hyde (D)
- Eva L. Ince (G)
- Ray Metcalfe (D), former Alaska State Representative
- Frank Vondersaar (D), perennial candidate

=== Results ===
Combined party primary results
Party	Candidate	Votes	%
Democratic	Diane E. Benson	19,421	40.41
Democratic	Ray Metcalfe	16,529	34.40
Green	Eva L. Ince	3,620	7.53
Libertarian	Alexander Crawford	3,176	6.61
Democratic	Todd Hyde	2,482	5.16
Democratic	Frank Vondersaar	2,141	4.46
Libertarian	Sol L. Gerstenfeld	687	1.43
Total votes		48,056	100.00

== Republican primary ==
=== Candidates ===
- Don Young, incumbent U.S. Representative

=== Results ===
Republican Party primary results
Party	Candidate	Votes	%
Republican	Don Young (incumbent)	81,089	100.00
Total votes		81,089	100.00

== General election ==
=== Predictions ===
Source	Ranking	As of
The Cook Political Report	Safe R	November 6, 2006
Rothenberg	Safe R	November 6, 2006
Sabato's Crystal Ball	Safe R	November 6, 2006
Real Clear Politics	Safe R	November 7, 2006
CQ Politics	Safe R	November 7, 2006

=== Results ===
2006 Alaska's at-large congressional district election
Party	Candidate	Votes	%
Republican	Don Young (incumbent)	132,743	56.57
Democratic	Diane E. Benson	93,879	40.01
Libertarian	Alexander Crawford	4,029	1.72
Green	Eva L. Ince	1,819	0.78
Independent	Bill Ratigan	1,615	0.69
Write-in		560	0.24
Total votes		234,645	100.00
Republican hold			
