= 1998 United States House of Representatives election in Alaska =

- November 3, 1998
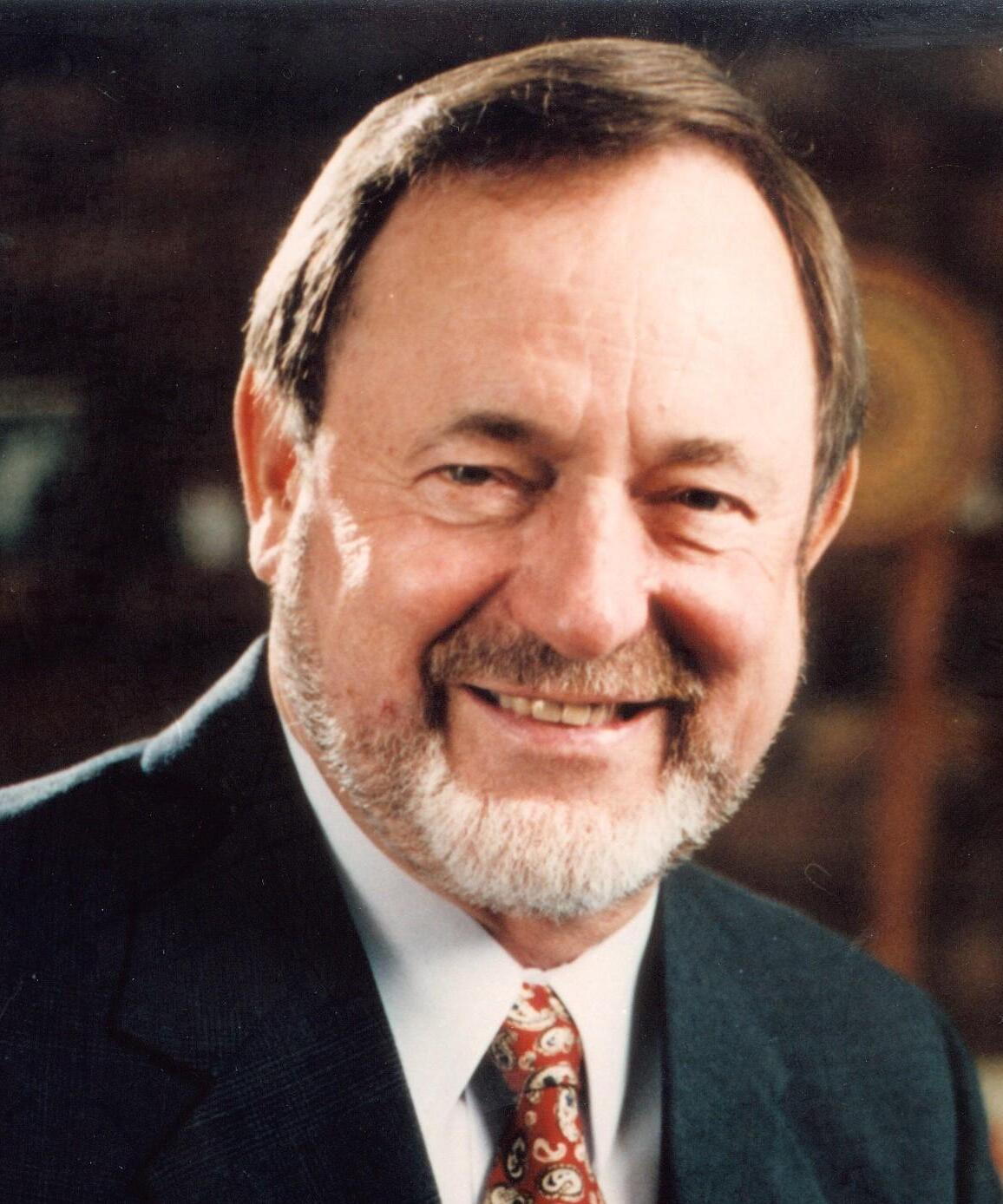

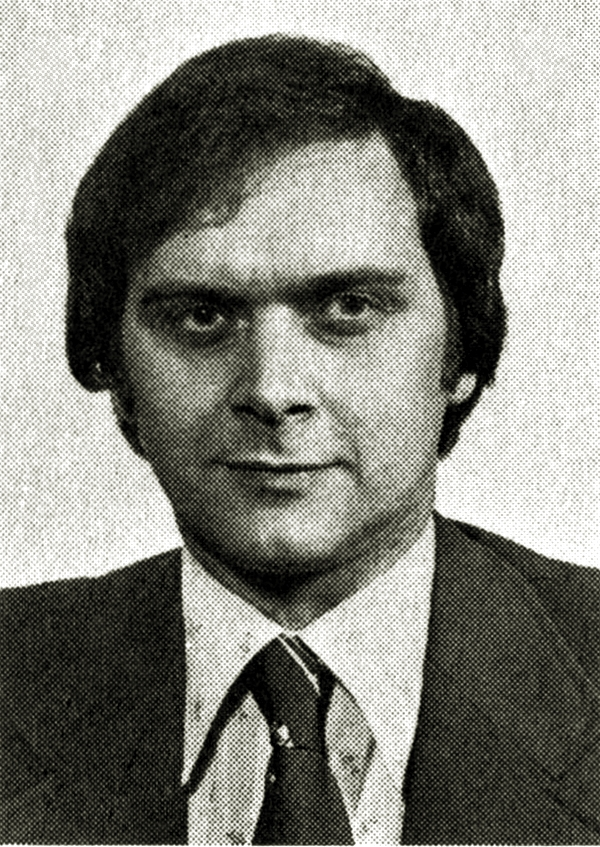
Nominee	Don Young	Jim Duncan
Party	Republican	Democratic
Popular vote	139,676	77,232
Percentage	62.6%	34.6%
- Young: 50–60% 60–70% 70–80% Duncan: 40–50% 50–60% 60–70%
Representative At-large before election
Don Young
Republican
Elected Representative At-large
Don Young
Republican

The Alaska congressional election of 1998 was held on Tuesday, November 3, 1998. The term of the state's sole Representative to the United States House of Representatives expired on January 3, 1999. The winning candidate would serve a two-year term from January 3, 1999, to January 3, 2001.

== General election ==
=== Results ===
1998 Alaska's at-large congressional district election
Party	Candidate	Votes	%
Republican	Don Young (inc.)	139,676	62.55
Democratic	Jim Duncan	77,232	34.59
Green	John Grames	5,923	2.65
Write-in		469	0.21
Total votes		223,300	100.00
Republican hold			
