= 2008 United States House of Representatives election in Alaska =

Representatives election held in Alaska in 2008

- November 4, 2008
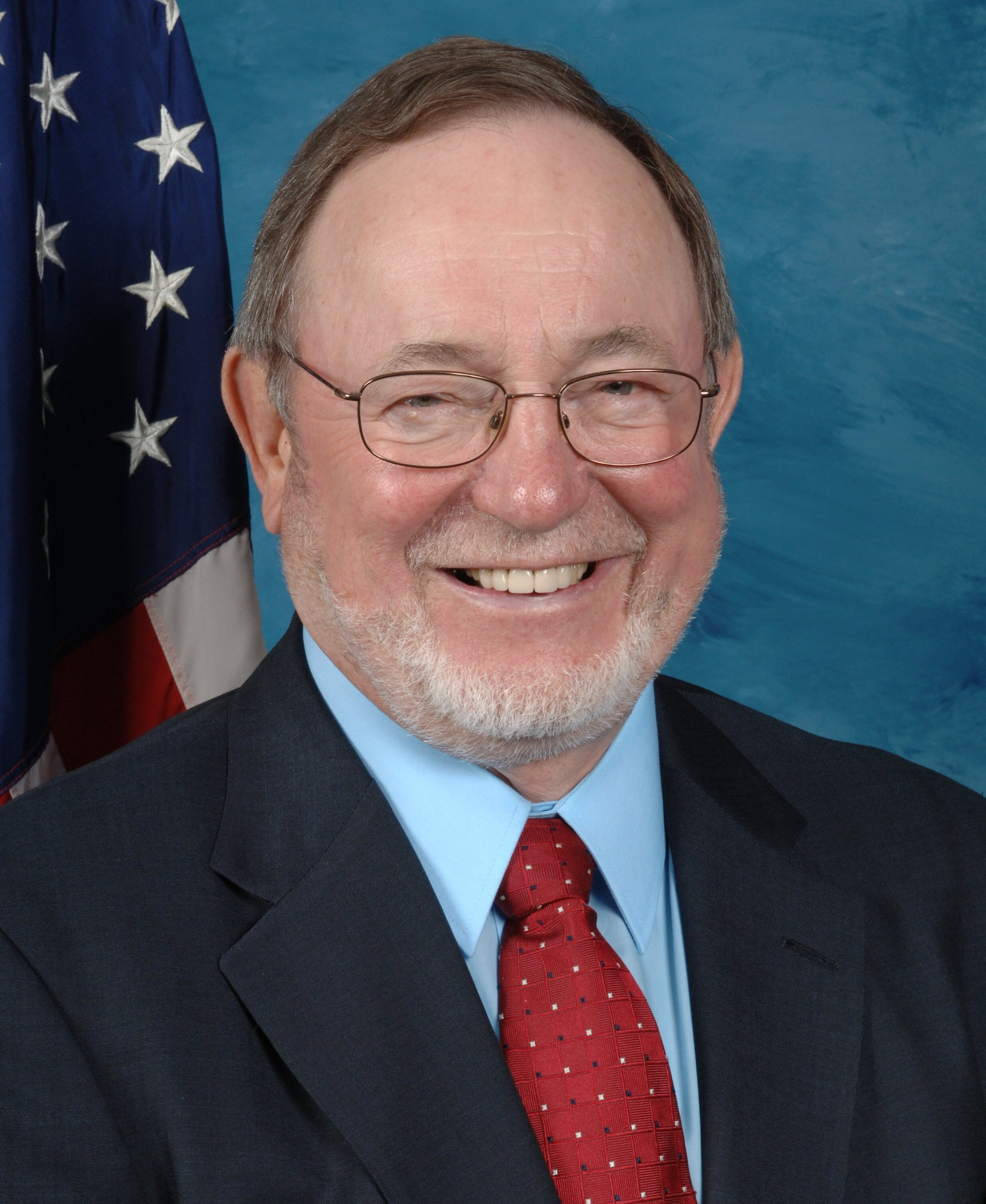

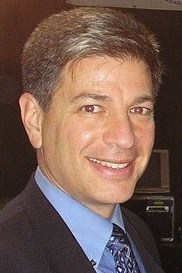
| Nominee | Don Young | Ethan Berkowitz |
| Party | Republican | Democratic |
| Popular vote | 158,939 | 142,560 |
| Percentage | 50.14% | 44.97% |
- Young: 40–50% 50–60% 60–70% Berkowitz: 40–50% 50–60% 60–70%
Representative At-large before election
Don Young
Republican
Elected Representative At-large
Don Young
Republican

The 2008 United States House of Representatives election in Alaska was held on November 4, 2008, to determine who would represent the state of Alaska in the United States House of Representatives. Alaska has one seat in the House, apportioned according to the 2000 United States census. Representatives are elected for two-year terms; whoever was elected would serve in the 111th Congress from January 4, 2009, until January 3, 2011. The election coincided with the nationwide presidential election. The primary election was held August 26, 2008.

Alaska's at-large congressional district covers the entire state and had been represented by Republican Don Young since 1973. He was challenged by Democratic nominee Ethan Berkowitz and Alaskan Independence candidate Don Wright.

Berkowitz won the Democratic primary against Diane E. Benson and Jake Metcalfe. The Republican primary was so close that Young and Sean Parnell needed to wait for the overseas absentee ballots, which had until September 10, 2008, to arrive and be counted. Young held a narrow lead of 239 votes after counting the other absentee and questioned ballots on September 6, 2008. Final results on September 18 showed Young winning by 304 votes, and Parnell announced that he would not seek a recount.

According to the 9/15-17 Research 2000 poll for Daily Kos, Berkowitz led Young in the general election by a 53%–39% margin, with a ±4% margin of error. After the primary, CQ Politics changed its forecast to 'Leans Democratic'. The Cook Political Report ranked it 'Republican Toss Up' and The Rothenberg Political Report rated it 'Democrat Favored'.

On November 12, 2008, Young was declared the winner, retaining the seat for his 19th term, despite a strong challenge from Berkowitz. Young was proclaimed winner, getting 50% of the vote compared to Berkowitz's 45%.

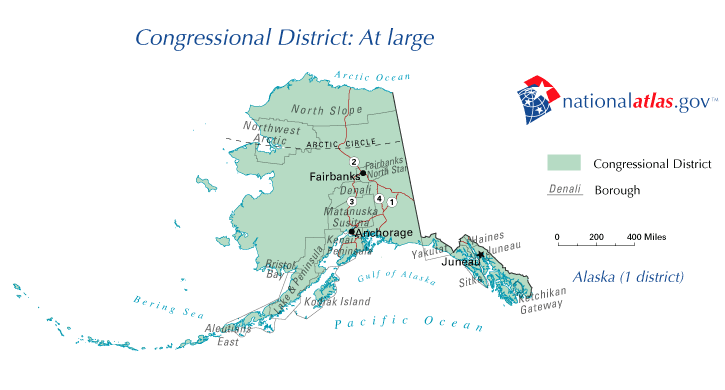

== ADL primary ==
The "ADL" ballot contained all of the primary candidates for the Alaska Democratic Party, the Alaskan Independence Party, and Libertarian Party of Alaska.

=== Candidates ===
==== Alaskan Independence ====
- Don Wright

==== Democratic ====
- Diane E. Benson, 2006 nominee, 2002 Green Party nominee for governor
- Ethan Berkowitz, nominee, former Minority Leader, Alaska House of Representatives
- Jake Metcalfe, former chair of the Alaska Democratic Party. He suspended his campaign amid allegations that his political adviser, Bill Scannell, had purchased domain names — containing Berkowitz's name — that re-directed users to a mock blog, and a San Francisco LGBT website.

=== Results ===
2008 Alaska "ADL" House of Representatives primary
| Party | Candidate | Votes | % |
|---|---|---|---|
| Democratic | Ethan Berkowitz | 39,784 | 53.17 |
| Democratic | Diane Benson | 28,347 | 37.89 |
| Independence | Don Wright | 6,690 | 8.94 |
| Total votes | | 74,821 | 100.00 |

== Republican primary ==
=== Candidates ===
- Gabrielle LeDoux, state representative
- Sean Parnell, lieutenant governor of Alaska
- Don Young, nominee, incumbent congressman

=== Results ===
2008 Alaska Republican House of Representatives primary
| Candidate | Votes | Percentage |
|---|---|---|
| Don Young (incumbent) | 48,195 | 45.47% |
| Sean Parnell | 47,891 | 45.19% |
| Gabrielle LeDoux | 9,901 | 9.34% |
| Totals | 105,987 | 100.00% |

== General election ==
=== Polling ===
| Source | Date | Ethan Berkowitz (D) | Don Young (R) |
|---|---|---|---|
| Research 2000 | May 12–14, 2008 | 50% | 40% |
| Research 2000 | December 3–6, 2007 | 49% | 42% |

==== Predictions ====
| Source | Ranking | As of |
|---|---|---|
| The Cook Political Report | Tossup | November 6, 2008 |
| Rothenberg | Likely D (flip) | November 2, 2008 |
| Sabato's Crystal Ball | Lean D (flip) | November 6, 2008 |
| Real Clear Politics | Lean D (flip) | November 7, 2008 |
| CQ Politics | Lean D (flip) | November 6, 2008 |

=== Results ===
2008 Alaska's at-large congressional district election
| Party | Candidate | Votes | % |
|---|---|---|---|
| Republican | Don Young (incumbent) | 158,939 | 50.14 |
| Democratic | Ethan Berkowitz | 142,560 | 44.97 |
| Independence | Don Wright | 14,274 | 4.50 |
| Write-in | | 1,205 | 0.38 |
| Valid ballots | | 316,978 | 96.83 |
| Invalid or blank votes | | 10,363 | 3.17 |
| Total votes | | 327,341 | 100.00 |
| Turnout | | | 66.03 |
| Republican hold | | | |

| Preceded by 2006 elections | United States House election in Alaska; 2008 | Succeeded by 2010 elections |
