= Diane E. Benson =

American politician

- Born: October 17, 1954 (age 72); Yakima, Washington

Diane E. Benson (born October 17, 1954) is an Alaskan politician, writer, dramatist and actress. She was the 2010 Democratic nominee for lieutenant governor of Alaska, defeating three other opponents in the Democratic primary. Benson's running mate for governor was former state House minority leader Ethan Berkowitz; they lost in the general election to the Republican ticket of Sean Parnell and Mead Treadwell by 22% of the vote.

Benson ran for Alaska governor as the Green Party candidate in 2002 and for the U.S. House against veteran incumbent Don Young as the Democratic nominee in 2006, attaining a historically good result of 40% with little support by the party. In her second House bid in 2008 she was defeated in the Democratic primary by Berkowitz, the person with whom she would run on the 2010 gubernatorial ticket and who was that year a "Red to Blue" candidate supported by the Democratic Congressional Campaign Committee.

== Life and education ==
According to Benson's official biography from her website, unlike her older brothers, she was born outside of Alaska in Yakima, Washington in 1954, while her mother was being treated for tuberculosis. Of Norwegian ancestry on her father's side and Tlingit ancestry on her mother's side, her tribal identity is T'akdeintaan (Sea Tern crest of the Raven Moiety) and Tax' Hit (Snail House).

Benson grew up in southeastern Alaska in foster homes and boarding school as well as logging camps with her father and in Sitka with her grandparents. She began volunteer work with senior citizens at Ketchikan Hospital at the age of 12, and although often homeless, worked a variety of social-service–oriented jobs with the underprivileged and the elderly until she took a position with the Fairbanks Native Association. At the age of 18 Benson was the youngest person ever to serve on the FNA Executive Board, and was invited by then-U.S. Senator Mike Gravel to work in Washington, D.C. She was accepted to study at Stanford University but could not attend due to personal and family reasons. Benson acquired a job as one of the first female tractor-trailer truck drivers on the Trans-Alaska Pipeline, in 1975.

In 1977, after working on a gill-netter (fishing boat) in Bristol Bay, and after completion of the pipeline, she worked numerous jobs including as a researcher for the Alaska Federation of Natives human resources department, layout artist and writer for the Tundra Times, researcher for North Pacific Rim, and other contracts. She paid for two years of college by driving trucks in the early 1980s as Alaska's first female union concrete-mixer driver. She did volunteer research work for the Berger Commission, and from 1986 until 1988 was a paralegal for Alaska Legal Services. Through the 1990s Benson ran the Northern Stars Talent Agency, promoting Alaska's talent in films and commercials nationally and internationally.

In 2001 Benson made local and national news when she objected to her master's degree advisor's use of her clan (Snail House) in a controversial sexual abuse poem, Indian Girls. She filed a grievance regarding disparate classroom treatment but the U.S. Department of Education found in favor of the professor. Benson completed her master's in creative writing in 2002 at another campus and under the tutelage of Pulitzer Prize winner N. Scott Momaday. She continues graduate studies, on a master's in public policy, at New England College.

== Theatre and writing ==
Benson began performance work in 1980 and has worked with most major Alaskan theatre companies in such productions as Crimes of the Heart, Wonderland, and Keet Shagoon. She taught stagecraft to inmates in Alaska prisons; led at-risk kids in summer theatre and video programs with Out North Contemporary Art House, created the first contemporary Alaska Native theatre in the state of Alaska in 1985; The Alaska Native Dance & Story Theatre; toured nationally with Naa Kahidi Theatre; directed in Canada for the Nakai Theatre Ensemble, was project coordinator for the Silamiut Greenlandic Theatre Project, several time Artist-in-Residence in rural Alaska, and wrote a number of plays including Sister Warrior and When My Spirit Raised Its Hands. Her one-woman show centering on early civil rights leader Elizabeth Peratrovich has earned Benson acclaim from Native journals and writers' groups, and was performed in Washington D.C. in March 2006 as part of the Smithsonian Institution's contribution to Women's History Month. She moved into film production work and co-produced a video, Pathways to Hope: Healing Child Sexual Abuse. Thereafter, she worked as researcher, writer and actor on the PBS documentary For the Rights of All: Ending Jim Crow in Alaska.

She has appeared in the television film Christmas with a Capital C, Disney's White Fang, the award-winning Box of Daylight, television's Real Stories of the Highway Patrol, and the International Animated Film Festival award-winning Sacajawea (1989) and the Alaska film Kusah Hakwaan as well as numerous industrials and commercials.

Benson has received recognition for her literary and public service work and has been nominated for the Pushcart Prize in Poetry (2000), the Alpert Award in the Arts (2004), and a USA Fellowship (2005). She received a gold medal from the International Committee, the Mayor's Certificate, and an Alaska State Legislature Citation for outstanding work as the 1996 Arctic Winter Games Cultural Coordinator, received a Goldie Award (2005) for her work on the radio program Today in Alaska Native History, received an Outstanding Service Award (2006) from the Anchorage Equal Rights Commission and a Trailblazer Award (2007) from Delta Sigma Theta sorority. In 2012 Benson received a national Bonnie Heavy-Runner Victim Advocacy Award for outstanding service to victims of crime in Indian country.

== Political career ==
Benson entered the world of politics a week after completing her master's degree in creative writing to run as a Green Party candidate (2002) with Della Coburn as the first two Native women to fill a ticket for governor and lieutenant governor, respectively. They received 1.26 percent of the vote.

In 2006, Benson returned to the Democratic Party and defeated former state representative Ray Metcalfe, among others, to win the nomination in Alaska's at-large congressional district, but lost in the general election to longtime Republican incumbent Don Young, finishing with just over 40 percent of the vote to Young's 57 percent. Benson ran a mostly volunteer campaign, with little support from the state or national Democratic parties until near the campaign's end. Her campaign spent about $200,000, about one-tenth of what the Young campaign spent. After her son sustained severe injuries while in service in Iraq, Benson focused her campaign on a call to end the Iraq War, and for improved outfitting of the troops. She criticized Young over his relationship with lobbyist Jack Abramoff and the Northern Mariana Islands business interests that Abramoff represented. Benson was Young's third opponent in 33 years to obtain a high percentage of the vote, and the first in 16 years. She made history when just before the election she was the first to debate the incumbent in a live televised debate on the local NBC station. Benson also succeeded in breaking a long-held policy omitting congressional challengers at the state's largest Alaskan conference, when she took the stage at the Alaska Federation of Natives Convention to speak as a congressional candidate at the insistence of the convention delegates.

In the August 2010 primary, Benson defeated multimillionaire Jack Powers and taxi driver Lynette Moreno-Hinz to become the Democratic nominee for lieutenant governor. Ironically, Benson ran on the same ticket with the man who defeated her in 2008 for the congressional nomination, former state representative Ethan Berkowitz. The two made an uncomfortable pair and they lost the general election. Since that campaign, Benson continues to teach and advocate for veterans and victims of crime.

== Personal life ==
Benson lives in Petersburg, Alaska, a small fishing village south of Juneau. Previously she lived for many years in Chugiak, Alaska, a community of Anchorage, and has one foster daughter and one son. Her son, Latseen Benson, is an Army veteran who was severely wounded in Iraq in November 2005.

== Bibliography ==
- "Standing Up Against the Giant", in American Indian Quarterly, 27.1&2 (2003) pp. 67–79, reproduced on line.
- Witness to the Stolen, Raven's Word Press, 2002.
- Sister Warrior, 2002. (play)
- When My Spirit Raised its Hands: The Story of Elizabeth Peratrovich and Alaska Civil Rights, 2001. (one-act play, see article below)
- Spirit of Woman
- Freight, Moon and Inconvenience, 2000.
- When Raven Cries (with Kadashan and Bertrand J. Adams), 1997. ISBN 1-890693-01-4
- Umyuugwagka: My Mind, My Consciousness. An Anthology of Poetry from the Arctic Regions ISBN 1-873918-14-3.
- Benson's history of the Tlingit peoples (encyclopedia entry)
- "Recovery" and "Potlatch Ducks", in Callaloo, 17:1 (Winter 1994)

== See also ==
- List of Native American politicians
- Native American women in politics

== Notes ==
Party political offices
Preceded by Ethan Berkowitz	Democratic nominee for Lieutenant Governor of Alaska; 2010	Succeeded by Hollis French
