= Mead Treadwell =

American politician (born 1956)

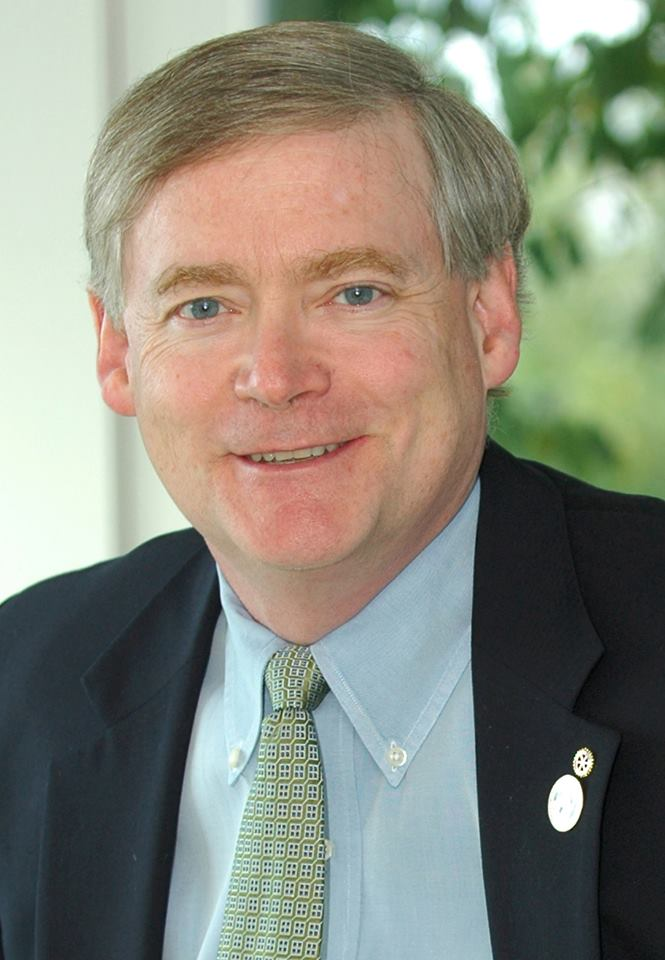

11th Lieutenant Governor of Alaska
- In office December 6, 2010 – December 1, 2014
- Governor: Sean Parnell
- Preceded by: Craig Campbell
- Succeeded by: Byron Mallott

Chair of the United States Arctic Research Commission
- In office 2006–2011
- President: George W. Bush; Barack Obama
- Preceded by: George B. Newton
- Succeeded by: Fran Ulmer

Personal details
- Born: Louis Mead Treadwell II; March 21, 1956 (age 70) New Haven, Connecticut, U.S.
- Party: Republican
- Education: Yale University (BA); Harvard University (MBA)

Louis Mead Treadwell II (born March 21, 1956) is an American businessman and politician who served as the 11th lieutenant governor of Alaska from 2010 to 2014. Treadwell also served as chair of the United States Arctic Research Commission from 2006 to 2010. He is a member of the Republican Party and was a candidate for the 2014 U.S. Senate election in Alaska.

== Early life and education ==
Treadwell was born in New Haven, Connecticut, the son of Anne and Timothy Treadwell. He grew up in the Sandy Hook section of Newtown, Connecticut, where his father was the former first selectman of Newtown; the Timothy B. Treadwell Memorial Park named in his late father's honor. Treadwell attended Newtown Public Schools and attended Sandy Hook Elementary school. Treadwell attended high school at Newtown High School and was then appointed by Senator Lowell Weicker as a Senate Page and the Senate Page School in Washington, D.C. He then studied at the Hotchkiss School, in Lakeville, Connecticut, graduating in 1974.

In 1978, Treadwell graduated with his Bachelor of Arts degree in history from Yale University. He later attended Harvard University and graduated with his Master of Business Administration from Harvard Business School in 1982.

== Career ==
In 1978, Treadwell moved to Alaska to take an internship with former U.S. Secretary of Interior Wally Hickel's campaign for governor of Alaska. Hickel lost a close contest to incumbent Republican Governor Jay S. Hammond in the primary election, coming short by 98 votes out of over 100,000 votes cast. After controversy including multiple recounts and court challenges, Hickel launched a write-in campaign in the general election, besting three of the four candidates on the ballot, though once again losing to Hammond. Following the election, Treadwell became a political reporter for the Anchorage Times.

After that, he was hired by Hickel's business company, Yukon Pacific Corporation, where he worked as treasurer and later vice president. Yukon Pacific was founded to investigate the possibility of building a trans-Alaska gas pipeline. Eventually, Yukon Pacific was purchased by CSX in 1989.

=== Early political career ===
In the wake of the 1989 Exxon Valdez oil spill, Treadwell left Yukon and went to Cordova, Alaska, to serve as the city's director of spill response. Cordova was badly impacted by the spill, which severely affected the area's fishing industry and disrupted the general ecology of the area. A September 1990 article in the Spartanburg Herald-Journal praised the cleanup efforts, saying that they had come along "quite well". Treadwell expressed optimism about the ecological rebound, cautioning that, while over half of beaches appeared normal and the quantity of commercial fish catches was exceptionally strong, the long-term effects of the spill would not be apparent for "years to come". In a 2006 piece on National Public Radio, Treadwell stated that some harmful effects of the oil spill have persisted.

Treadwell helped establish the Siberia Alaska Gateway Project of the Alaska State Chamber of Commerce, which worked to open the US-Russia border with the Friendship Flight. He led two expeditions to Wrangel Island in 1990 and led a team of nuclear safety experts to the Bilibino Nuclear Power Plant in Chukotka in 1993. He hosted RADEX, the Arctic nations’ first circumpolar radiation release response exercise in 1994.

In 1990, incumbent one-term governor Steve Cowper decided not to seek re-election. Hickel decided to run as the nominee of the Alaskan Independence Party, and won with a plurality of 39% of the vote. Hickel appointed Treadwell served as Deputy Commissioner of Alaska's Department of Environmental Conservation. He served in that position from 1991 to 1994 and continued to help the cleanup of the spill. He wrote new oil spill prevention laws, and helped create the Department's Environmental Justice division. He also represented the state of Alaska on U.S. delegations in three circumpolar government groups: the eight-nation Arctic Environmental Protection Strategy, the Arctic Council, and the regional Governors’ Northern Forum. He joined Governor Hickel at the United Nations Earth Summit in Rio de Janeiro, Brazil, in 1992.

After Governor Hickel decided not to run for re-election in 1994, Treadwell served as a board member on the Alaska Science and Technology Foundation. He is a member of the Alaska Siberia Research Center board. Treadwell was elected a Fellow National of the Explorers Club in 2002 and chairs the North Pacific Alaska Chapter of the club.

=== Business ventures ===
Treadwell has been involved in numerous successful business ventures and is a prominent member of Alaska's business community. Treadwell is on the Board of Venture Ad Astra, which creates "remote sensing and location-based technologies for National Security, Position, Timing, Navigational Infrastructure, and Commercial Markets". Treadwell played a role in the foundation of Digimarc, a digital watermarking technology provider ranked first on Forbes list of fastest growing tech companies in 2004. He has also served as non-executive chairman of Immersive Media Corporation (IMC), a company notable for developing the camera used for Google's Street View and Map Quest's 360 View services.

=== Arctic Research Commission ===
Treadwell was appointed to the United States Arctic Research Commission in 2001, and was appointed by President George W. Bush to serve as chair in 2006. He has been called to testify before the United States Congress on several occasions. In 2008 and 2009, Treadwell testified to Congress regarding his concerns about anthropogenic global warming, but when running for Lt. Governor in 2010, said he did not believe carbon dioxide emissions were a significant problem. On August 20, 2009, he was called before the Homeland Security Subcommittee of the Senate Committee on Appropriations, when it made a field trip to Alaska. During his testimony Treadwell warned that the recently announced moratorium on commercial fishing of the Beaufort Sea would fail if it were not matched by similar moratoriums by Canada and Russia.

During this time, he also served as Senior Fellow of the Institute of the North, founded by Hickel, which was a part of the Alaska Pacific University. He served as the Institute's first full-time Managing Director and Adjunct Professor of Business . Treadwell also did research at the institute. He focused on strategic, defense, management, transportation, and telecommunications of Alaska. He is a co-author of Missile Defense, the Space Relationship, and the Twenty-First Century as well as lead author of Why the Arctic Matters, a Commonwealth North 2009 study.

In 2008 Treadwell served as a delegate for Alaska in the 2008 Republican National Convention and served early on as co-chair of Mitt Romney's 2008 Presidential campaign in Alaska.

=== Lieutenant governor of Alaska ===
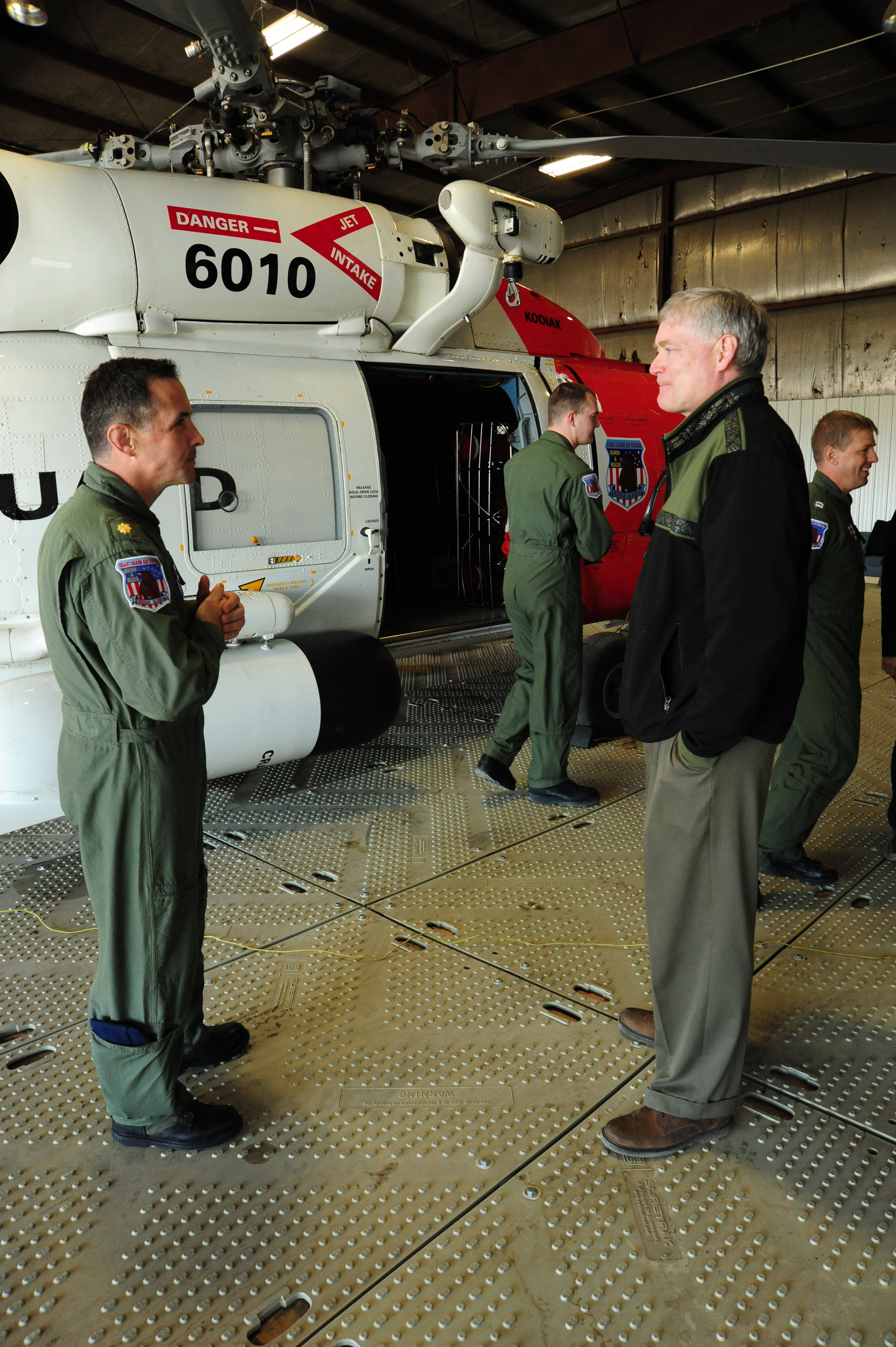
Treadwell in Barrow in July 2012, touring facilities during the U.S. Coast Guard's Arctic Shield exercise.

In May 2010, Treadwell announced his intent to run for lieutenant governor of Alaska. He gave his primary reasons for running as frustration with an overbearing federal government, concern for the flagging Trans-Alaska Pipeline, and a need to diversify Alaska's economy through international trade. Treadwell won the August 24, 2010 Republican primary election with approximately 53% of the vote, a margin of more than 22% over his closest opponent, state Representative Jay Ramras. Following his primary campaign victory, Treadwell's campaign joined with that of incumbent Republican Governor Sean Parnell.

In the general election in November 2010, Parnell and Treadwell faced the Democratic ticket of Ethan Berkowitz and Diane E. Benson, as well as slates from the state's other two recognized parties, the Alaskan Independence and Libertarian parties. Parnell and Treadwell defeated their Democratic opponents by a margin of approximately 59 to 38 percent, with the other two candidates receiving the remaining 3 percent. Treadwell was sworn in as the Lieutenant Governor of Alaska on December 6, 2010.

=== 2014 U.S. Senate election ===
Treadwell announced on December 1, 2012, at a Republican luncheon in Fairbanks, Alaska that he was forming an exploratory committee to run for the United States Senate, seeking the GOP nomination to challenge one-term incumbent Mark Begich.

Treadwell filed for the U.S. Senate primary race on June 18, 2013, and officially held his campaign launch on September 12, 2013. Other candidates for the nomination included Joe Miller and Dan Sullivan.

On August 19, 2014, Sullivan won the primary with 40%, having vastly outspent Miller (32%) and Treadwell (25%) combined.

=== 2018 Alaska gubernatorial Republican primary ===
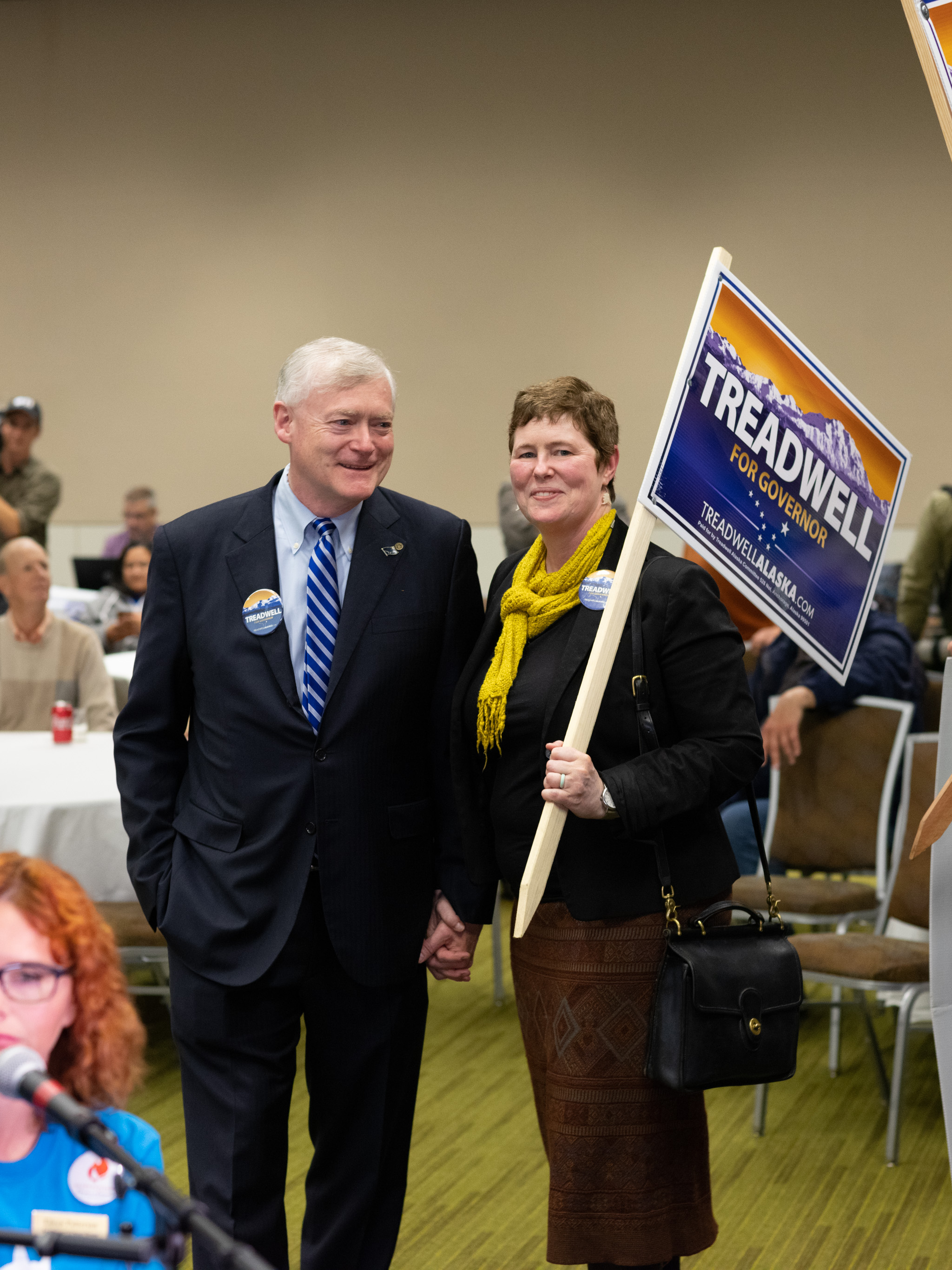
Treadwell on the night of the primary

On June 1, 2018, the last day to file for candidacy Mead announced would run for Governor of Alaska in 2018. He lost the party's nomination to state senator Mike Dunleavy.

2018 Alaska Gubernatorial Republican Primary
Party	Candidate	Votes	%
Republican	Michael J. Dunleavy	39,193	61.79
Republican	Mead Treadwell	20,230	31.89
Republican	Michael D. Sheldon	1,408	2.22
Republican	Merica Hlatcu	957	1.51
Republican	Thomas A. Gordon	849	1.34
Republican	Gerald L. Heikes	432	0.68
Republican	Darin A. Colbry	363	0.57

== Personal life ==
Treadwell and his wife, Carol, had three children, two sons and a daughter. Carol Treadwell died in 2002 of cancer. He is active in the Catholic Church.

== Works ==
- Roberts, Malcolm B., ed. (1990). Going Up In Flames. (Treadwell with numerous collaborators including Robert B. Atwood, Walter J. Hickel and Irene Ryan; authorship credited to the Commonwealth North Federal-State Relations Committee). Anchorage: Alaska Pacific University Press for Commonwealth North. ISBN 0-935094-15-6. 132 pp.

Political offices
Preceded by Craig Campbell	Lieutenant Governor of Alaska; 2010–2014	Succeeded by Byron Mallott
Party political offices
Preceded by Sean Parnell	Republican nominee for Lieutenant Governor of Alaska; 2010	Succeeded by Dan Sullivan
