= 2010 Alaska gubernatorial election =

- November 2, 2010
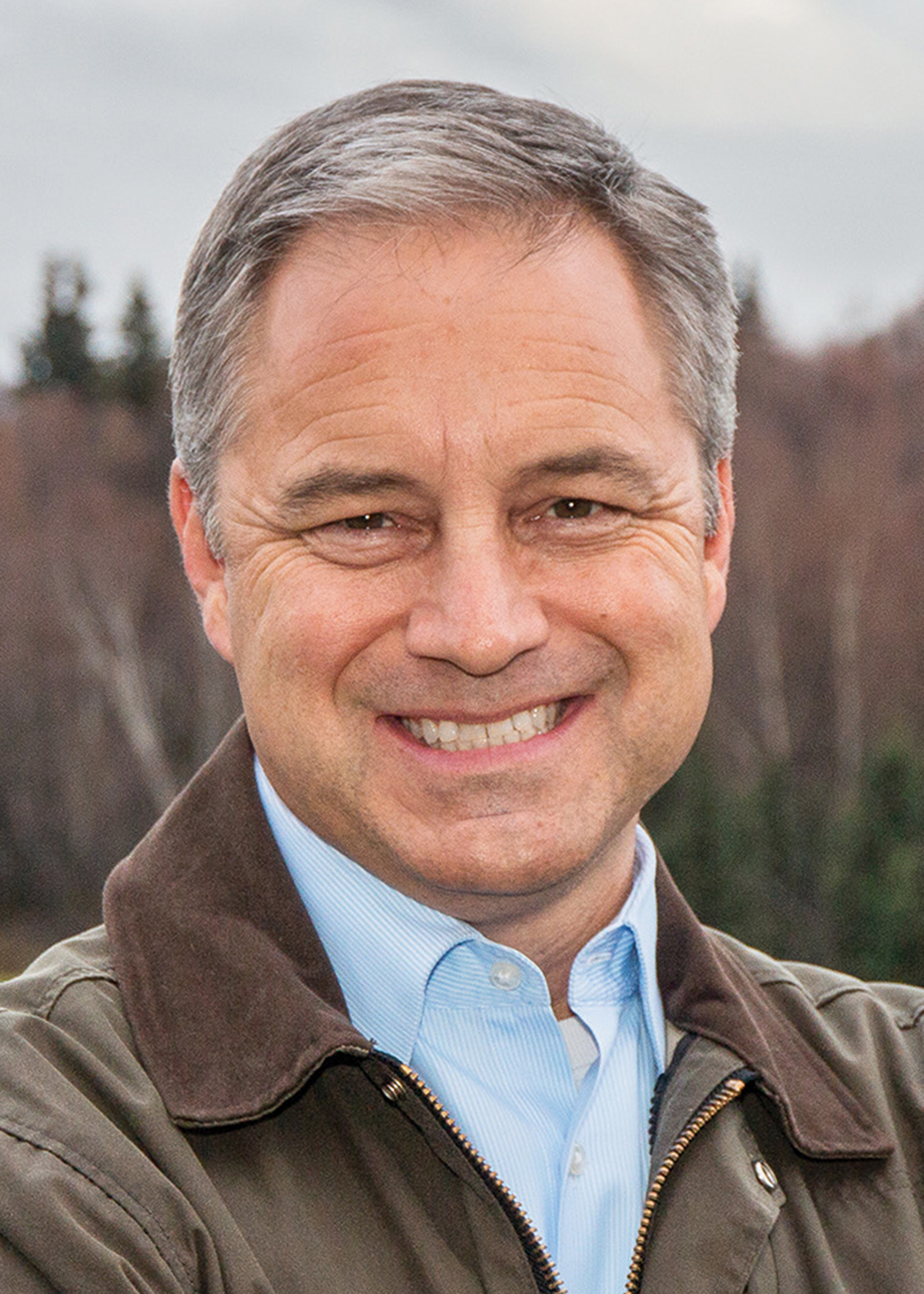

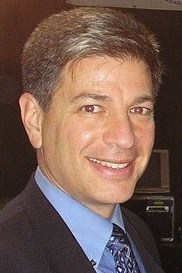
Nominee	Sean Parnell	Ethan Berkowitz
Party	Republican	Democratic
Running mate	Mead Treadwell	Diane E. Benson
Popular vote	151,318	96,519
Percentage	59.06%	37.67%
- Parnell: 40–50% 50–60% 60–70% 70–80% 80–90% Berkowitz: 40–50% 50–60%
Governor before election
Sean Parnell
Republican
Elected Governor
Sean Parnell
Republican

The 2010 Alaska gubernatorial election took place on November 2, 2010. Former Governor Sarah Palin did not run, having resigned in July 2009. Incumbent Governor Sean Parnell, who as lieutenant governor succeeded Palin following her resignation, announced that he would seek a full term.

Following the primary election on Tuesday, August 24, 2010, the Democratic ticket consists of Ethan Berkowitz and Diane E. Benson running against Republican Parnell and his running mate, Mead Treadwell. In the general election Parnell/Treadwell defeated Berkowitz/Benson by a wide margin.

Parnell received just over 59% of the vote, the highest percentage for any Alaska gubernatorial candidate in history. This is the only election in Alaskan history where any party won three consecutive gubernatorial elections.

== Republican primary ==
=== Certified for the ballot ===
- Gerald L. Heikes, perennial candidate
- Merica Hlatcu
- Sam Little, truck driver and country musician
- Sean Parnell, incumbent Governor
- Ralph Samuels, former Majority Leader of the Alaska House of Representatives
- Bill Walker, attorney and former Mayor of Valdez

=== Declined ===
- Sarah Palin, former Governor
- Ted Stevens, former U.S. Senator & U.S. Attorney (ran for 2014 U.S. Senate election)

=== Withdrew ===
- John Harris, former Speaker of the Alaska House of Representatives, announced in January 2010 that he would be seeking re-election to his House seat instead

=== Polling ===
Poll source	Dates administered	Sean Parnell	Ralph Samuels	Bill Walker	Undecided
Hellenthal & Associates	July 22–25, 2010	60%	13%	15%	12%
Basswood Research	February 27–28, 2010	69%	9%	4%	21%

=== Results ===
Republican primary results
Party	Candidate	Votes	%
Republican	Sean Parnell (incumbent)	54,125	49.49
Republican	Bill Walker	35,734	33.95
Republican	Ralph Samuels	15,376	14.05
Republican	Sam Little	1,661	1.54
Republican	Merica Hlatcu	626	0.56
Republican	Gerald L. Heikes	460	0.40
Total votes		107,982	100

== Alaskan Independence-Democratic-Libertarian primary ==
=== Candidates ===
==== Alaskan Independence Party ====
- Don Wright, perennial candidate and former president of the Alaska Federation of Natives (1970-1972)

==== Democratic Party ====
- Ethan Berkowitz, former Minority Leader of the Alaska House of Representatives, nominee for Lieutenant Governor in 2006 and Congress in 2008
- Hollis S. French, State Senator
- Bob Poe, Businessman (Withdrawn)

==== Libertarian Party ====
- William Toien

=== Results ===
ADL primary results
Party	Candidate	Votes	%
Democratic	Ethan Berkowitz	22,607	48.69
Democratic	Hollis French	18,018	38.81
Independence	Don Wright	4,104	8.84
Libertarian	William Toien	1,698	3.66
Total votes		46,427	100

== General election ==
=== Candidates ===
- Ethan Berkowitz (D)
  - Berkowitz's running mate is college professor Diane Benson, who ran for Governor in 1998 on the Green Party ticket.
- Sean Parnell (R)
  - Parnell's running mate is businessman Mead Treadwell.
- William Toien (L)
  - Toien's running mate is Jeffrey Brown.
- Don Wright (AIP)
  - Wright's running mate is Michigan Militia founder Norm Olson.

=== Lieutenant Governor Candidates ===
In Alaska, the lieutenant governor runs separately from the governor in the primary election. The respective party nominees for each office are then joined as a party ticket in the general election. Occasionally, a minor party will nominate a candidate for governor, but without a running mate.

- Diane E. Benson (Democrat) (won primary)
- Eddie Burke (Republican), Anchorage businessman and radio talk show host
- Craig Campbell (Republican), incumbent (withdrew April 2010)
- Lynette Moreno-Hinz, Anchorage taxicab driver who was involved with a taxi deregulation ballot issue in 2008
- Jay Ramras (Republican), Fairbanks businessman and member of the Alaska House
- Mead Treadwell (Republican) (won primary)

=== Predictions ===
Source	Ranking	As of
Cook Political Report	Safe R	October 14, 2010
Rothenberg	Safe R	October 28, 2010
RealClearPolitics	Likely R	November 1, 2010
Sabato's Crystal Ball	Safe R	October 28, 2010
CQ Politics	Likely R	October 28, 2010

=== Polling ===
Poll source	Dates administered	Sean Parnell (R)	Ethan Berkowitz (D)
CNN/Time Magazine	October 15–19, 2010	62%	36%
Rasmussen Reports	October 13, 2010	52%	39%
CNN/Time Magazine	September 24–28, 2010	57%	38%
Rasmussen Reports	September 19, 2010	54%	34%
Rasmussen Reports	August 31, 2010	53%	43%
Public Policy Polling	August 27–28, 2010	55%	37%
Basswood Research	August 28–29, 2010	54%	40%
Rasmussen Reports	July 15, 2010	53%	34%
Rasmussen Reports	May 6, 2010	58%	30%

=== Fundraising ===
Campaign activity disclosure reports are filed with the Alaska Public Offices Commission. For the period ending February 1, 2010, the candidates and others subject to filing have reported the following to APOC:

Candidate	Cash on hand	Candidate's own money	Total income	Total expenses	Total debts	Surplus/ (deficit)
Berkowitz	$0	$10,295.77	$128,178.52	$19,500.20	$0	$108,678.32
Parnell	$0	$0	$214,696.77	$93,842.38	$2,025.00	$123,150.38

=== Results ===
2010 Alaska gubernatorial election
Party	Candidate	Votes	%	±%
Republican	Sean Parnell (incumbent)	151,318	59.06	+10.7
Democratic	Ethan Berkowitz	96,519	37.67	−3.3
Independence	Don Wright	4,775	1.86	+1.3
Libertarian	Billy Toien	2,682	1.05	+0.7
Write-in votes		898	0.35	+0.2
Majority		54,799	21.39	
Turnout		256,192	52.3	
Republican hold		Swing	+14.26	

==== Boroughs and census areas that flipped from Democratic to Republican ====
- Ketchikan Gateway Borough (largest city: Ketchikan)
- Petersburg
- Bethel Census Area (largest city: Bethel)
- Kusilvak Census Area (largest city: Hooper Bay)
- North Slope Borough (largest city: Utqiaġvik)
- Prince of Wales–Hyder Census Area (largest city: Craig)
- Yukon–Koyukuk Census Area (largest city: Fort Yukon)
- Juneau
- Haines Borough (largest census-designated place: Haines)
- Aleutians East Borough (largest city: Akutan)
