= Sean Parnell =

American politician (born 1962)

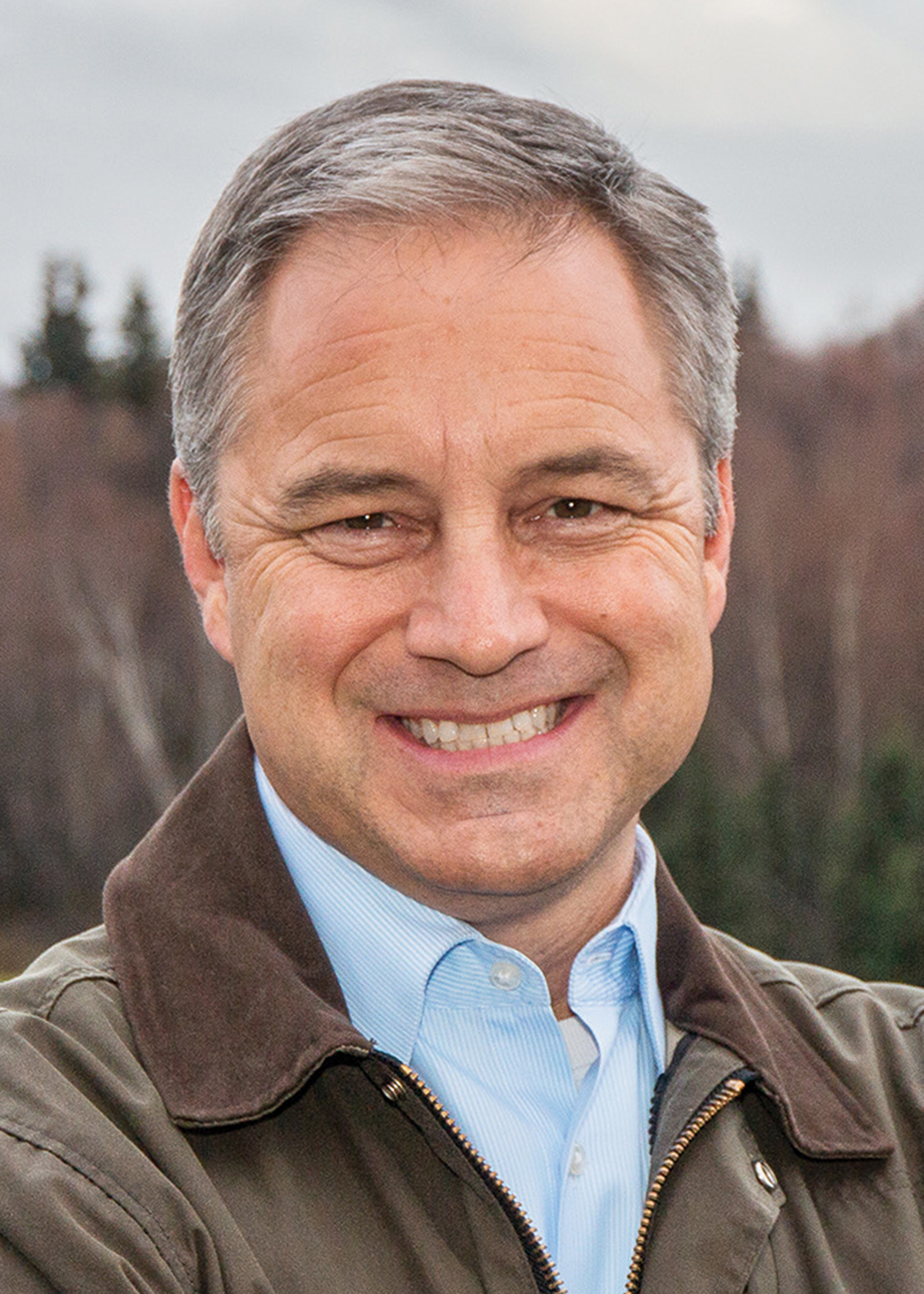
- Parnell in 2014

12th Chancellor of the University of Alaska, Anchorage
- In office June 12, 2021 – May 16, 2025
- Preceded by: Bruce Schultz (acting)
- Succeeded by: Cheryl Siemers (acting)

10th Governor of Alaska
- In office July 26, 2009 – December 1, 2014
- Lieutenant: Craig Campbell; Mead Treadwell
- Preceded by: Sarah Palin
- Succeeded by: Bill Walker

9th Lieutenant Governor of Alaska
- In office December 4, 2006 – July 26, 2009
- Governor: Sarah Palin
- Preceded by: Loren Leman
- Succeeded by: Craig Campbell

Member of the Alaska Senate from the I district
- In office January 13, 1997 – January 13, 2001
- Preceded by: Steve Rieger
- Succeeded by: John Cowdery

Member of the Alaska House of Representatives from the 17th district
- In office January 11, 1993 – January 12, 1997
- Preceded by: Constituency established
- Succeeded by: John Cowdery

Personal details
- Born: Sean Randall Parnell; November 19, 1962 (age 63) Hanford, California, U.S.
- Party: Republican
- Spouse: Sandra Scebold (m. 1987)
- Children: 2
- Education: Pacific Lutheran University (BBA); Seattle University (JD)

Sean Randall Parnell (born November 19, 1962) is an American attorney and politician who was the tenth governor of Alaska from 2009 to 2014. He succeeded Sarah Palin in July 2009 and was elected to a full term as governor in 2010. In 2014, he narrowly lost his bid for re-election and returned to work in the private sector. He is a member of the Republican Party.

Parnell graduated from the University of Puget Sound's School of Law (now known as Seattle University School of Law). He practiced law before being elected to the Alaska House of Representatives in 1992 and he continued to work in private legal practice while he was a member of the Alaska House and later, the Alaska Senate. He served two terms in the Alaska House from 1993 to 1997 before he was elected to a term in the Alaska Senate from 1997 to 2001. Parnell continued his legal career in the private sector, working as an attorney and as the state government relations director for Phillips Petroleum, now known as ConocoPhillips, and an attorney at the law firm Patton Boggs.

Returning to public service, Parnell won the Republican primary race for lieutenant governor in 2006 and became Palin's running mate in her 2006 gubernatorial campaign, where the Palin and Parnell ticket defeated former Democratic governor Tony Knowles. Parnell was sworn in as lieutenant governor of Alaska in December 2006 and later assumed the governorship after Palin resigned in July 2009. Parnell was elected to a full term as governor in 2010, defeating former state representative Ethan Berkowitz in the general election. Parnell is the first unelected Alaska governor to be elected in his own right. He was narrowly defeated for a second term in 2014 by the formally Independent "unity ticket" of Republican-turned-Independent Bill Walker and Democrat Byron Mallott. Parnell became chancellor of the University of Alaska Anchorage on June 12, 2021.

== Early life and education ==
Parnell was born in Hanford, California, the elder of two sons of Thelma Carol (née Liebherr) and Kevin Patrick "Pat" Parnell. He and his younger brother, Schoen (pronounced "Shane") grew up in a close-knit family. Two of his paternal great-grandparents were Norwegian.

Sean's father, Pat, was stationed at Fort Richardson, near Anchorage, Alaska, while he served in the U.S. Army during statehood years (1957–1959), and returned to Alaska with his family in 1973, establishing residence in Anchorage. Sean was 10 years old at the time. His mother worked as a high school teacher for more than 25 years. She taught at Bartlett High School and East Anchorage High School, the latter a short distance from their home. Both of his parents were entrepreneurs, owning a retail photocopy and office supply business together in Anchorage for more than 25 years. He worked in the family business as a teenager and during his college years.

In 1980, Pat Parnell, a Democrat, ran against incumbent Don Young for Alaska's sole seat in the United States House of Representatives, taking 25.82% of the vote. Sean Parnell graduated from East Anchorage High School in 1980. He earned a BBA degree in 1984 from Pacific Lutheran University and a Juris Doctor degree in 1987 from the University of Puget Sound School of Law (now known as Seattle University School of Law).

== Career ==
He is admitted to the bar in both Alaska and Washington, D.C. Parnell worked as an attorney in the private sector from 1987 to 2003, 2005 to 2006, and in 2015 after his term as governor. For nine years of the time he owned his own law practice. In the 1990s, he continued in private practice while he served in the Alaska House and the Alaska Senate.

=== Legal career ===
When Parnell left the Alaska Senate, he became director of government relations in Alaska for Phillips Petroleum, which later became ConocoPhillips. In 2005, he joined the law firm Patton Boggs and practiced law. Patton Boggs represented ExxonMobil in the Exxon Valdez oil spill litigation, although Parnell had no role in that representation or litigation. Parnell left Patton Boggs less than two years later on December 3, 2006.

=== Alaska Legislature ===
Parnell was first elected to the Alaska House of Representatives, in 1992 at the age of twenty-nine. He represented a district in Anchorage that included at that time, Independence Park, Dimond Blvd., and the Southport/Bayshore areas of Anchorage. After his first year in the state house, Parnell was named the "Most Effective Freshman Legislator" by his colleagues and those who worked in the State Capitol. This recognition arose because Parnell was known for taking the time to help other legislators hone and pass their legislation and in doing so, learned the legislative process and developed relationships with his colleagues. In 1994, Parnell was re-elected to represent South Anchorage in the Alaska House. Throughout his four years in the Alaska House of Representatives, Parnell was known for his work on the House Finance Committee and in the fight against domestic violence and sexual assault in Alaska. During those years he sponsored and passed seminal legislation known as the Domestic Violence Prevention Act of 1996 that was Alaska's first consistent, comprehensive statewide policy on this issue.

In 1996, Parnell ran for and was elected to a seat in the Alaska Senate and became a member of the Energy Council and served on the powerful Senate Finance Committee. In 1999 and 2000, he became a member of the Senate Republican Majority's Leadership when his Senate colleagues chose him to serve as the co-chair of the Senate Finance Committee. In 2000, Parnell finished his first and only term in the state senate, choosing not to seek re-election. He cited his commitment to his family as his reason and returned to work in the private sector. In 2006, Parnell was elected lieutenant governor of Alaska, along with Alaska Governor Sarah Palin. In July 2009, when Governor Palin resigned her position, Parnell became governor and finished the term of office. In 2010, Parnell won a four-year term as governor in his own right.

=== Lieutenant governor ===
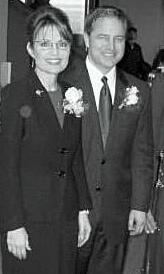
Governor Sarah Palin with Lieutenant Governor Sean Parnell in Bethel, Alaska, December 2006

In 2005, Parnell ran and won in the Republican primary to become lieutenant governor. Afterward, in the general election, he was paired with Sarah Palin as her running mate. In Alaska, the lieutenant governor candidates run separately from the governor candidates in the primary election race, but after the primaries, the nominees for governor and lieutenant governor run together as a slate. Palin and Parnell were elected with 48.33% of the vote over former governor Tony Knowles and State Representative Ethan Berkowitz's 40.97% share of the vote.

=== 2008 congressional campaign ===
On March 14, 2008, Parnell began his campaign to take on embattled 18-term member of Congress Don Young in the August 26 Republican primary. Parnell was endorsed by Sarah Palin, National Review magazine, and the fiscally conservative 501(c)4 organization Club for Growth.

On July 31, 2008, Parnell told Roll Call he would not drop out of his race against Young to run against U.S. Senator Ted Stevens, who had been indicted. Parnell lost the primary for the U.S. House seat. The margin between incumbent Young and Parnell was narrow, and the winner was not immediately clear. The result released on September 18 showed Young winning by 304 votes. Parnell said he trusted the integrity of the work of the Division of Elections, an agency he oversaw as Alaska's lieutenant governor. He said in a statement, "While a recount could change the outcome of this exceedingly close election – normal human error being what it is – such a result is unlikely. As such, I do not believe it justifies an expenditure of taxpayer funds."

=== Governor of Alaska ===
==== Ascent to office ====
On July 26, 2009, halfway through her term as governor, Palin resigned. Parnell replaced her, becoming Alaska's tenth governor, in accordance with the Alaska Constitution. Craig Campbell, commissioner of Alaska's Department of Military and Veterans Affairs, succeeded Parnell as lieutenant governor after Palin first named Joe Schmidt, commissioner of corrections, as a replacement for Parnell, and Schmidt resigned from the second-in-line position on July 6, 2009.

==== 2010 campaign ====
Parnell ran for a full term as governor in 2010. In the primary he faced off against Bill Walker, a former mayor of Valdez, Alaska and aide to former governor Walter J. Hickel, and Ralph Samuels, a retiring member of the Alaska House of Representatives. Although Walker seemed to gain traction towards the end based on the issue of building a natural gas pipeline, Samuels and Walker split the anti-Parnell vote and Parnell won the nomination. He and Mead Treadwell, who had won the August primary for lieutenant governor, faced off against the Democratic ticket of former House majority leader and 2008 congressional nominee Ethan Berkowitz and Diane Benson. Parnell-Treadwell eventually defeated Berkowitz-Benson by over ten points.

==== 2014 campaign ====
Parnell ran for re-election in 2014. Former Republican Bill Walker challenged Parnell as an independent politician, and merged his campaign with Democratic Party gubernatorial nominee Byron Mallott, who became Walker's running mate as an independent. Parnell conceded the election to Bill Walker on November 15, 2014.

Parnell drew criticism during his re-election campaign over his support of billions in tax reductions for the petrochemical industry as well scandals regarding accusations of coverups of sexual abuse scandals, cronyism, corruption and whistleblower suppression, within the Alaska National Guard. Of 19 incumbent Republican governors running for re-election, Parnell and Pennsylvania's Tom Corbett were the only ones who lost in the 2014 elections.

==== Tenure ====
Parnell launched the "Choose Respect" initiative in 2010 to combat the high rates of domestic violence and sexual assault in Alaska. Recognizing the severe impact of these issues, Parnell's campaign focused on raising awareness, improving law enforcement and prosecution, and enhancing support for survivors through education and prevention programs. The initiative gained significant support, with annual events like marches, rallies, and vigils held across the state to promote respect and solidarity against violence. By 2012, over 100 communities were participating in these events, demonstrating widespread commitment to the cause.

=== University of Alaska Anchorage Chancellor ===
Parnell was appointed Chancellor of the University of Alaska Anchorage in 2021 and steered UAA through the aftermath of the COVID pandemic. Parnell focused on college affordability, student success, and positioning UAA as a trusted community partner. He expanded the Chancellor’s Cabinet to include governance leaders, a community campus representative and additional representation from Student Affairs and Academic Affairs to enhance decision-making transparency and improve two-way communication with university leadership.

University of Alaska President Pat Pitney credited Parnell for his focus on UAA affordability and accessibility, keeping UAA’s tuition rates flat between Fall 2021 and Spring of 2025. During his tenure, enrollment grew and student retention improved, with student headcount up for seven straight semesters and retention at its highest mark in 9 years, reversing a decade of decline. Parnell also obtained the papers of Senator Ted Stevens, valuable Alaska history in support of the Alaska Leaders Archive. He retired as Chancellor on May 16, 2025.

== Personal life ==
Parnell and his college girlfriend Sandy married in 1987; they moved to Anchorage where Parnell began practicing law. Their daughters, Grace and Rachel, were born in Anchorage and grew up there. Grace is a professional photographer and Rachel is a university student pursuing a history degree.

In October 2015, Sean and Sandy Parnell moved to Palmer, Alaska. He returned to working as an attorney in private practice and opened a law firm, specializing in business law, contracts, and real estate. In his retirement, Sean Parnell plans to continue coaching Alaska's emerging leaders.

Party political offices
Preceded by Loren Leman	Republican nominee for Lieutenant Governor of Alaska; 2006	Succeeded by Mead Treadwell
Preceded by Sarah Palin	Republican nominee for Governor of Alaska; 2010, 2014	Succeeded by Mike Dunleavy
Political offices
Preceded by Loren Leman	Lieutenant Governor of Alaska; 2006–2009	Succeeded by Craig Campbell
Preceded by Sarah Palin	Governor of Alaska; 2009–2014	Succeeded by Bill Walker
U.S. order of precedence (ceremonial)
Preceded by Sarah Palin as Former Governor	Order of precedence of the United States	Succeeded by Bill Walker as Former Governor
