= 2022 Alaska gubernatorial election =

- November 8, 2022
- Turnout: 44.40% ▼
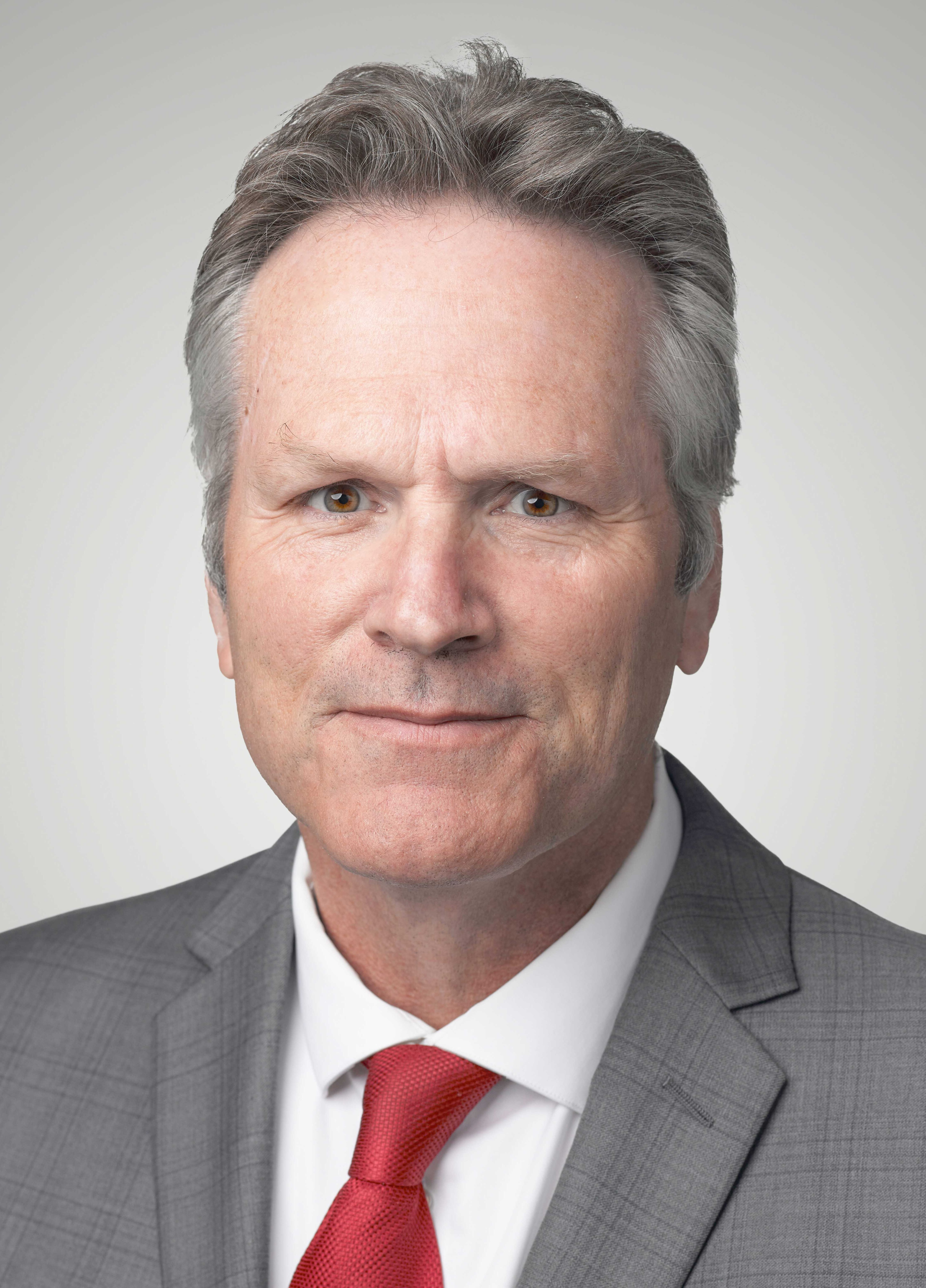

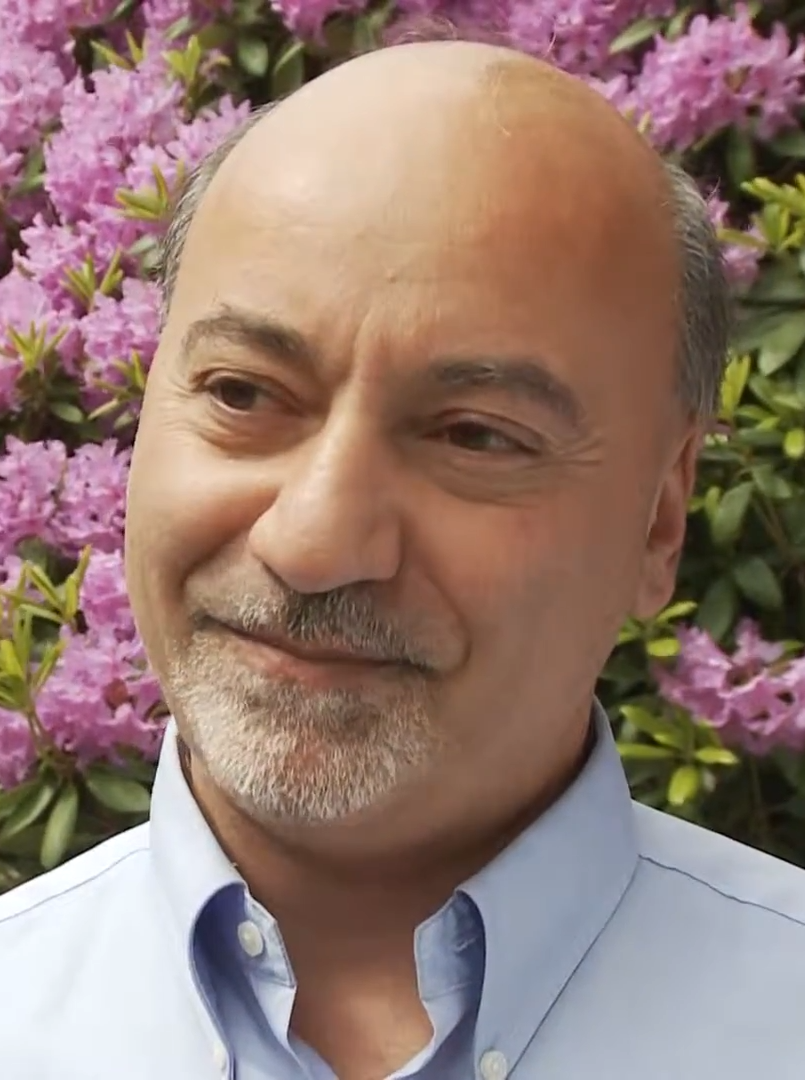

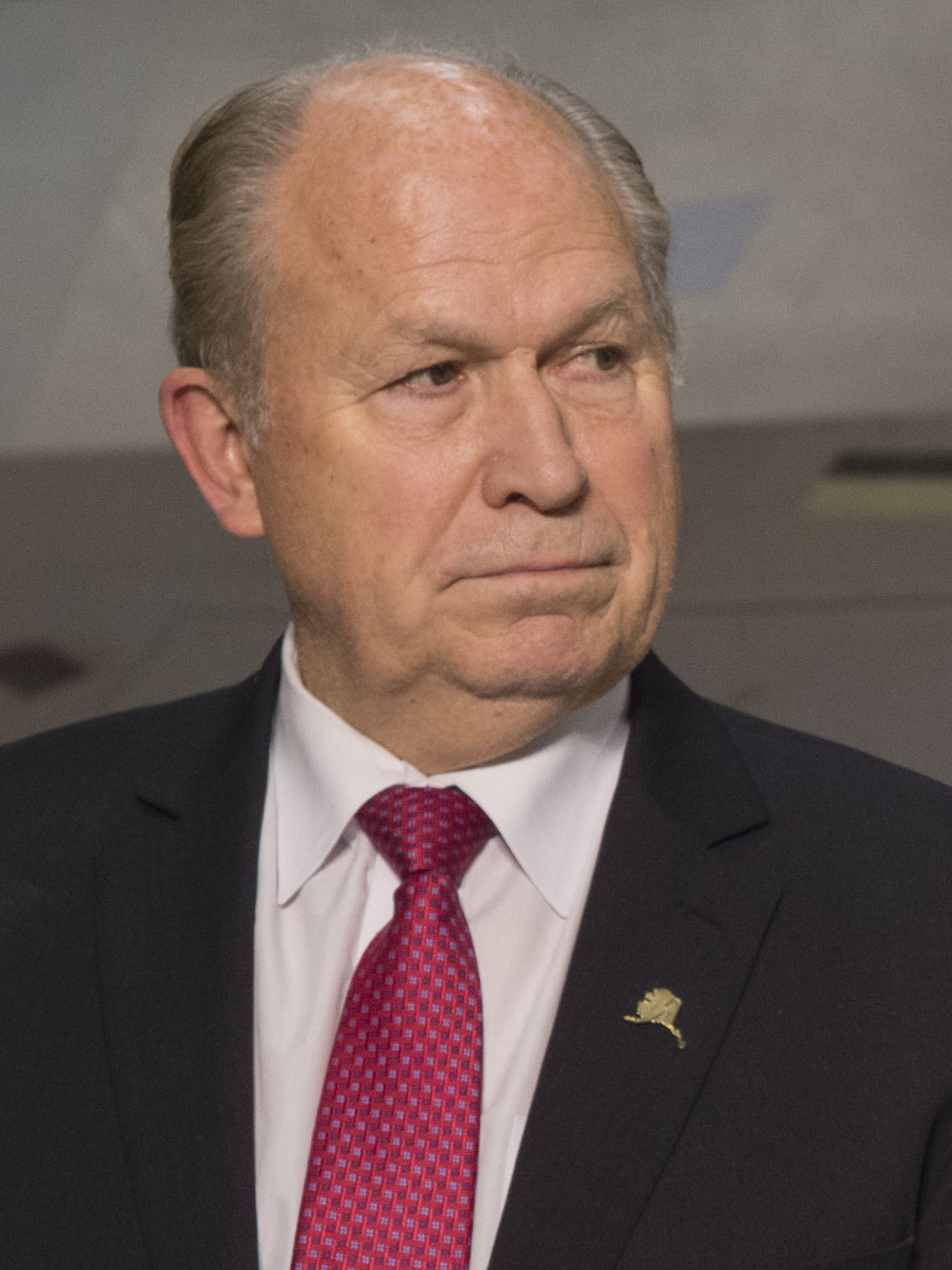
Candidate	Mike Dunleavy	Les Gara	Bill Walker
Party	Republican	Democratic	Independent
Running mate	Nancy Dahlstrom	Jessica Cook	Heidi Drygas
Popular vote	132,632	63,851	54,668
Percentage	50.29%	24.21%	20.73%
- Dunleavy: 30–40% 40–50% 50–60% 60–70% 70–80% Gara: 40–50% Walker: 30–40% 40–50%
Governor before election
Mike Dunleavy
Republican
Elected Governor
Mike Dunleavy
Republican

The 2022 Alaska gubernatorial election was held on Tuesday November 8, 2022, to elect the governor of Alaska. Incumbent Republican governor Mike Dunleavy won re-election to a second term, becoming the first Republican governor to be re-elected to a second term since Jay Hammond in 1978 and the first governor, regardless of political affiliation, to be re-elected to a second term since Tony Knowles in 1998.

Following voter approval of Ballot Measure 2 during the 2020 Alaska elections, this was the first gubernatorial election in Alaska held under a new election process, involving Instant-runoff voting. All candidates ran in a nonpartisan blanket top-four primary on August 16, 2022, and the top four candidates advanced to the general election under instant-runoff.

In addition to Dunleavy, Democratic former state representative Les Gara, independent former governor Bill Walker, and Republican Kenai Peninsula Borough mayor Charlie Pierce advanced to the general election. In the general election, Dunleavy narrowly received the majority of votes in the first round, preventing an instant runoff.

== Primary election ==
=== Republican Party ===
==== Advanced to general ====
- Mike Dunleavy, incumbent governor
  - Running mate: Nancy Dahlstrom, former commissioner of the Alaska Department of Corrections and former state representative
  - Previous running mate: Kevin Meyer, incumbent lieutenant governor (withdrew December 28, 2021)
- Charlie Pierce, mayor of the Kenai Peninsula Borough
  - Running mate: Edie Grunwald, chair of the Alaska Parole Board and candidate for lieutenant governor in 2018 (Note: Suspended her campaign and endorsed Dunleavy on October 25, 2022 after allegations of sexual harassment against Pierce but remained on the ballot.)

==== Eliminated in primary ====
- David Haeg, hunting guide
  - Waynette Coleman, nurse
- Christopher Kurka, state representative
  - Running mate: Paul Hueper, activist
- Bruce Walden, veteran and author
  - Running mate: Tanya Lange, social service worker

==== Declined ====
- Natasha von Imhof, state senator

=== Democratic Party ===
==== Advanced to general ====
- Les Gara, former state representative
  - Running mate: Jessica Cook, teacher

==== Declined ====
- Mike Navarre, former mayor of the Kenai Peninsula Borough and former state representative (endorsed Walker)

=== Libertarian Party ===
==== Eliminated in primary ====
- William S. "Billy" Toien, nominee for governor in 2010 and 2018
  - Running mate: Shirley Rainbolt

=== Alaskan Independence Party ===
==== Eliminated in primary ====
- John Howe, machinist and nominee for U.S. Senate in 2020
  - Running mate: Shellie Wyatt

=== Independents ===
==== Advanced to general ====
- Bill Walker, former governor
  - Running mate: Heidi Drygas, former commissioner of the Alaska Department of Labor and Workforce Development

==== Eliminated in primary ====
- William Nemec, former Denali Borough Assembly member
  - Running mate: Ronnie Ostrem

==== Declined ====
- Alyse Galvin, public education advocate and candidate for Alaska's at-large congressional district in 2018 and 2020 (running for state house)
- Al Gross, orthopedic surgeon, commercial fisherman, son of former Alaska Attorney General Avrum Gross, and candidate for U.S. Senate in 2020 (ran for U.S. House)

=== Polling ===
Poll source	Date(s) administered	Sample size (Note: Key: A – all adults RV – registered voters LV – likely voters V – unclear)	Margin of error	Mike Dunleavy (R)	Les Gara (D)	Charlie Pierce (R)	Bill Walker (I)	Other	Undecided
Alaska Survey Research	July 20–25, 2022	1,253 (LV)	± 3.0%	41%	22%	5%	23%	9% (Note: Howe and Kurka with 3%; Toien with 2%; Haeg with 1%; Nemec and Walden with 0%)	–
Lake Research Partners (D) (Note: This poll was sponsored by Gara's campaign)	May 5–11, 2022	500 (LV)	± 4.4%	40%	24%	5%	18%	3%	10%

=== Results ===
Primary election results
Party	Candidate	Votes	%
Republican	Mike Dunleavy (incumbent); Nancy Dahlstrom	76,534	40.43
Democratic	Les Gara; Jessica Cook	43,660	23.06
Independent	Bill Walker; Heidi Drygas	43,111	22.77
Republican	Charlie Pierce; Edie Grunwald	12,458	6.58
Republican	Christopher Kurka; Paul Hueper	7,307	3.86
Independence	John Howe; Shellie Wyatt	1,702	0.90
Republican	Bruce Walden; Tanya Lange	1,661	0.88
Libertarian	William S. Toien; Shirley Rainbolt	1,381	0.73
Republican	David Haeg; Waynette Coleman	1,139	0.60
Independent	William Nemec; Ronnie Ostrem	347	0.18
Total votes		188,626	100.00

== General election ==
=== Predictions ===
Source	Ranking	As of
The Cook Political Report	Likely R	July 26, 2022
Inside Elections	Likely R	July 22, 2022
Sabato's Crystal Ball	Likely R	June 29, 2022
Politico	Likely R	April 1, 2022
RCP	Likely R	January 10, 2022
Fox News	Likely R	May 12, 2022
538	Likely R	August 25, 2022
Elections Daily	Likely R	November 7, 2022

=== Debates ===
2022 Alaska gubernatorial debates
No.	Date	Host	Link	Participants			
P Participant A Absent N Non-invitee I Invitee W Withdrawn							
P Participant A Absent N Non-invitee I Invitee W Withdrawn				Mike Dunleavy	Bill Walker	Les Gara	Charlie Pierce
1	October 11, 2022	Civic and Convention Center		P	P	P	P

=== Endorsements ===
Mike Dunleavy (R)

U.S. executive branch officials

- Donald Trump, 45th president of the United States (2017–2021)

U.S. senators

- Dan Sullivan, U.S. senator from Alaska (2015–present)

Statewide officials

- Sarah Palin, 9th governor of Alaska (2006–2009), candidate for Alaska's at-large congressional district in 2022 and Republican nominee for vice president in 2008
- Kelly Tshibaka, former commissioner of the Alaska Department of Administration (2019–2021) and candidate for the U.S. Senate in 2022

State legislators

- Jay Ramras, former state representative (2005–2011)

Local officials

- Dave Bronson, mayor of Anchorage (2021–2024)
- Dan Sullivan, former mayor of Anchorage (2009–2015)

Organizations

- Alaska Republican Party (co-endorsed with Pierce)
- NRA Political Victory Fund
Les Gara (D)

Statewide officials

- Jane Angvik, former commissioner of the Alaska Department of Commerce and Economic Development and former Anchorage Assembly member (1979–1985)
- Tony Knowles, former governor of Alaska (1994–2002)

State legislators

- Vic Fischer, former state senator and drafter of the Alaska Constitution

Organizations

- Planned Parenthood
Christopher Kurka (R)

Individuals

- Joe Miller, former U.S. magistrate judge (2002–2004) and former candidate for U.S. Senate in 2010 and 2016
Charlie Pierce (R)

State legislators

- Lora Reinbold, state senator (2019–present) and state representative (2013–2019)

Organizations

- Alaska Republican Party (co-endorsed with Dunleavy)
Bill Walker (I)

State legislators

- Cathy Giessel, former president of the Alaska Senate (Republican)
- Grier Hopkins, state representative (Democratic)
- Andy Josephson, state representative (2017–present) (Democratic)
- Beth Kerttula, former state representative (1999–2014) (Democratic)
- Ivy Spohnholz, state representative (Democratic)
- Adam Wool, state representative (Democratic)

Local officials

- Bruce Botelho, former mayor of Juneau (2003–2012) and former Alaska Attorney General (1988–1991) (Democratic)
- Santa Claus, mayor pro tem of North Pole and candidate for Alaska's at-large congressional district in the 2022 special election (Independent)
- Mike Navarre, former mayor of the Kenai Peninsula Borough (1996–1999, 2011–2017) and former state representative (1985–1996) (Democratic)

Individuals

- Vince Beltrami, former president of the AFL–CIO

Labor unions

- Alaska AFL–CIO
- American Federation of Teachers - Alaska
- National Education Association - Alaska

Organizations

- Sealaska Corporation
Declined to endorse

State legislators

- Rick Halford, former president of the Alaska Senate (Republican)

Individuals

- Al Gross, orthopedic surgeon, commercial fisherman, son of former Alaska Attorney General Avrum Gross, Democratic-endorsed nominee for U.S. Senate in 2020, and withdrawn candidate for Alaska's at-large congressional district in the 2022 special and regular elections (Independent)

=== Polling ===
Poll source	Date(s) administered	Sample size	Margin of error	RCV count	Mike Dunleavy (R)	Les Gara (D)	Charlie Pierce (R)	Bill Walker (I)	Undecided / Not Ranked
Dittman Research	October 21–25, 2022	403 (LV)	–	1	47%	25%	4%	23%	—
Dittman Research	October 21–25, 2022	403 (LV)	–	2	51%	25%	Elim	24%	—
Alaska Survey Research	September 25–27, 2022	1,282 (LV)	± 3.0%						
Alaska Survey Research	September 25–27, 2022	1,282 (LV)	± 3.0%	1	43%	28%	7%	21%	—
Alaska Survey Research	September 25–27, 2022	1,282 (LV)	± 3.0%	2	48%	28%	Elim	23%	—
Alaska Survey Research	September 25–27, 2022	1,282 (LV)	± 3.0%	3	53%	47%	Elim	Elim	—
Alaska Survey Research	September 25–27, 2022	1,282 (LV)	± 3.0%	3* (Note: Hypothetical scenario with Dunleavy and Walker as the top two based on expressed ranked choice preferences)	52%	Elim	Elim	48%	—
Fabrizio Ward (R)/Impact Research (D) (Note: Poll sponsored by AARP)	September 6–11, 2022	1,050 (LV)	(Note: The margin of sampling error for the 500 statewide sample is ±4.4%; for the 840 total sample of voters 50+ is ±3.3%.)	N/A (Note: Standard polling question.)	45%	24%	6%	17%	8% U
Fabrizio Ward (R)/Impact Research (D)	September 6–11, 2022	1,050 (LV)	(Note: The margin of sampling error for the 500 statewide sample is ±4.4%; for the 840 total sample of voters 50+ is ±3.3%.)	1	49%	26%	7%	19%	8% NR
Fabrizio Ward (R)/Impact Research (D)	September 6–11, 2022	1,050 (LV)	(Note: The margin of sampling error for the 500 statewide sample is ±4.4%; for the 840 total sample of voters 50+ is ±3.3%.)	2	54%	26%	Elim (Note: Pierce eliminated. Vote transfer breakdown: 70% to Dunleavy, 7% to Walker, 3% to Gara, and 20% not ranked further.)	20%	10% NR
Fabrizio Ward (R)/Impact Research (D)	September 6–11, 2022	1,050 (LV)	(Note: The margin of sampling error for the 500 statewide sample is ±4.4%; for the 840 total sample of voters 50+ is ±3.3%.)	3	59%	41%	Elim	Elim (Note: Walker eliminated. Vote transfer breakdown: 67% to Gara, 13% to Dunleavy, and 20% not ranked further.)	13% NR
Alaska Survey Research	July 2–5, 2022	1,201 (LV)	± 2.9%	1	44%	26%	11%	20%	—
Alaska Survey Research	July 2–5, 2022	1,201 (LV)	± 2.9%	2	51%	26%	Elim	23%	—

Hypothetical polling

Poll source	Date(s) administered	Sample size	Margin of error	RCV count	Mike Dunleavy (R)	Les Gara (D)	Natasha von Imhof (R)	Bill Walker (I)	Undecided
Alaska Survey Research	October 22–27, 2021	969 (RV)	± 3.2%	1	43%	22%	8%	28%	—
Alaska Survey Research	October 22–27, 2021	969 (RV)	± 3.2%	2	46%	24%	Elim	30%	—
Alaska Survey Research	October 22–27, 2021	969 (RV)	± 3.2%	3	49%	Elim	Elim	51%	—

Mike Dunleavy vs. Les Gara

Poll source	Date(s) administered	Sample size	Margin of error	Mike Dunleavy (R)	Les Gara (D)	Undecided
Hays Research Group (I) (Note: This poll was sponsored by Walker's campaign)	July 22–24, 2022	613 (LV)	± 4.0%	55%	45%	—

Mike Dunleavy vs. Bill Walker

Poll source	Date(s) administered	Sample size	Margin of error	Mike Dunleavy (R)	Bill Walker (I)	Undecided
Hays Research Group (I)	July 22–24, 2022	613 (LV)	± 4.0%	50%	50%	—

=== Results ===
2022 Alaska gubernatorial election
Party	Candidate	Votes	%	±%
Republican	Mike Dunleavy (incumbent); Nancy Dahlstrom	132,632	50.29%	−1.15%
Democratic	Les Gara; Jessica Cook	63,851	24.21%	−20.20%
Independent	Bill Walker; Heidi Drygas	54,668	20.73%	+18.70%
Republican	Charlie Pierce; Edie Grunwald (withdrew)	11,817	4.48%	N/A
Write-in		784	0.30%	+0.09%
Total votes		263,752	100.0%	
Turnout		266,943	44.40%	−5.43%
Registered electors		601,161		
Republican hold				

==== Boroughs and census areas that flipped from Democratic to Republican ====
- Anchorage
- Kodiak Island (largest city: Kodiak Island)
- Bristol Bay Borough (largest city: Naknek)
- Lake & Peninsula Borough (largest city: Newhalen)
- Aleutians West Census Area (largest city: Unalaska)
- Aleutians East Borough (largest city: Akutan)
- Bethel Census Area (largest city: Bethel)
- Dilingham Census Area (largest city: Dilingham)
- North Slope Borough (largest city: Utqiaġvik)
- Northwest Arctic Borough (largest city: Kotzebue)
- Kusilvak Census Area (largest city: Hooper Bay)
- Nome Census Area (largest city: Nome)
- Yukon–Koyukuk Census Area (largest city: Fort Yukon)
- Prince of Wales–Hyder Census Area (largest city: Craig)
- Petersburg

==== Boroughs and census areas that flipped from Democratic to Independent ====
- Juneau
- Sitka
- Hoonah–Angoon Census Area (largest town: Hoonah)
- Haines Borough (largest census-designated place: Haines)
- Yakutat

== See also ==
- 2022 United States gubernatorial elections
- 2022 United States Senate election in Alaska
- 2022 United States House of Representatives election in Alaska
- 2022 Alaska Senate election
- 2022 Alaska House of Representatives election
- 2022 Alaska elections

== Notes ==
Partisan clients
