= 2022 United States House of Representatives election in Alaska =

2022 United States House of Representatives election in Alaska's at-large district
- November 8, 2022
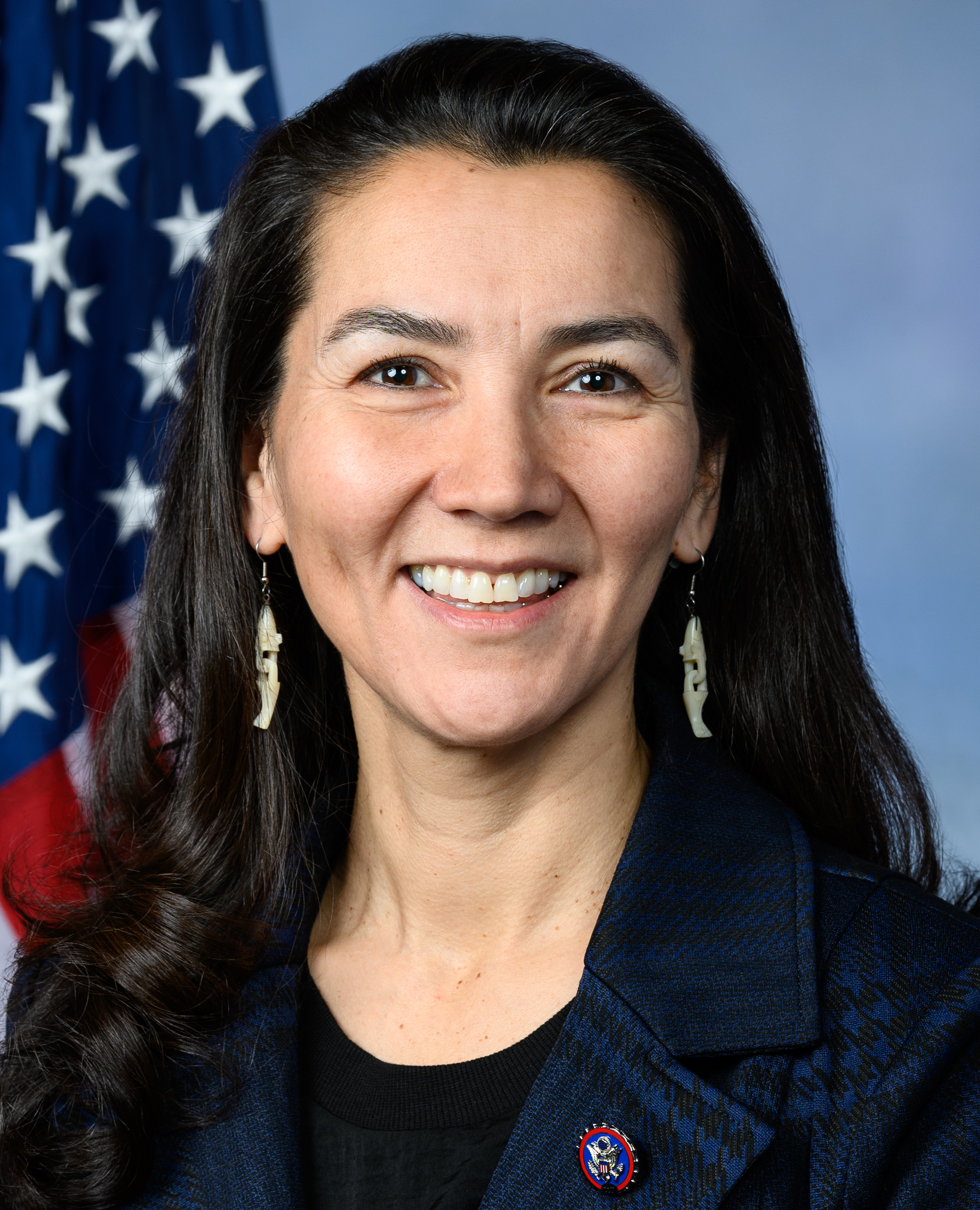

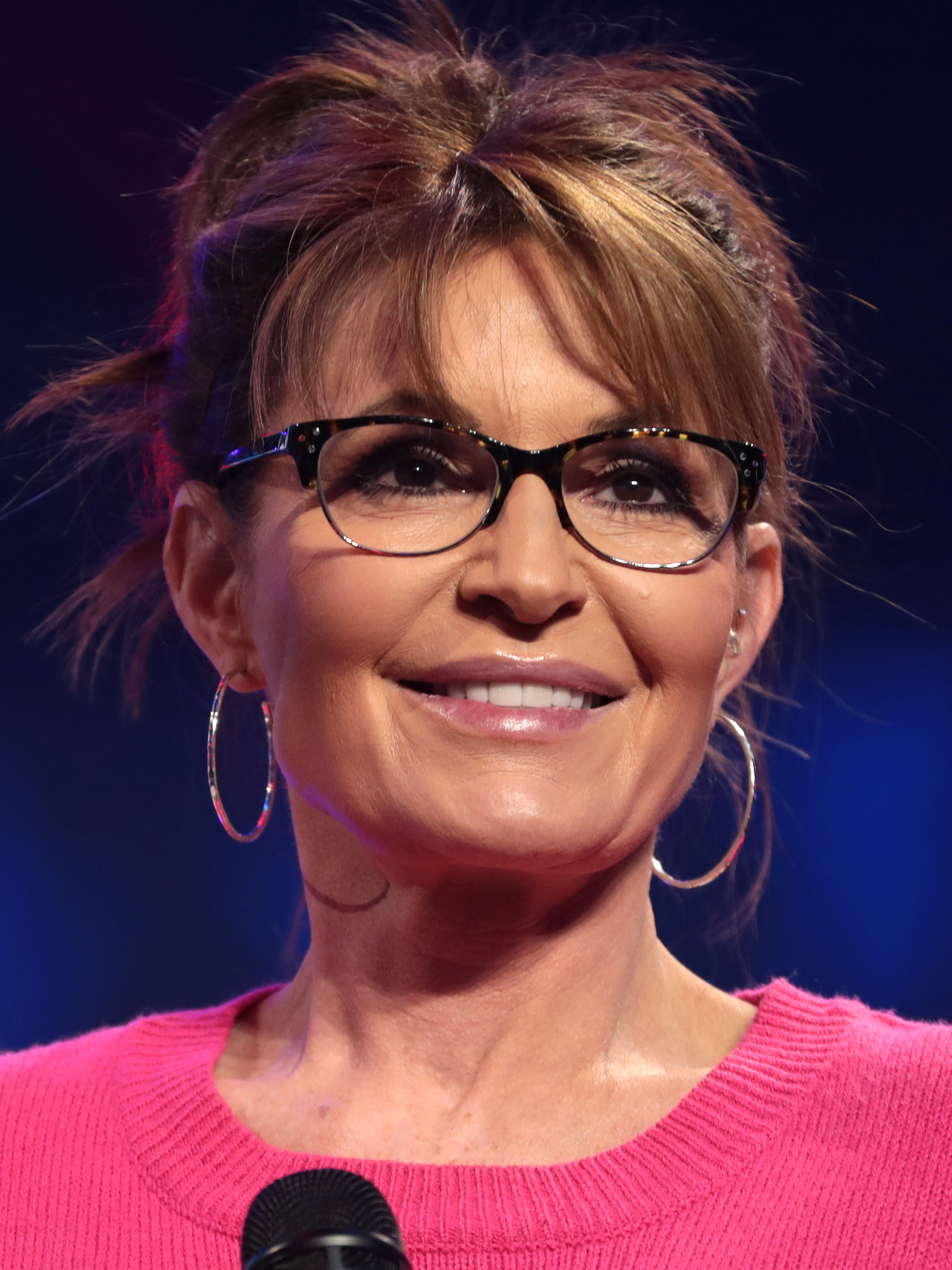

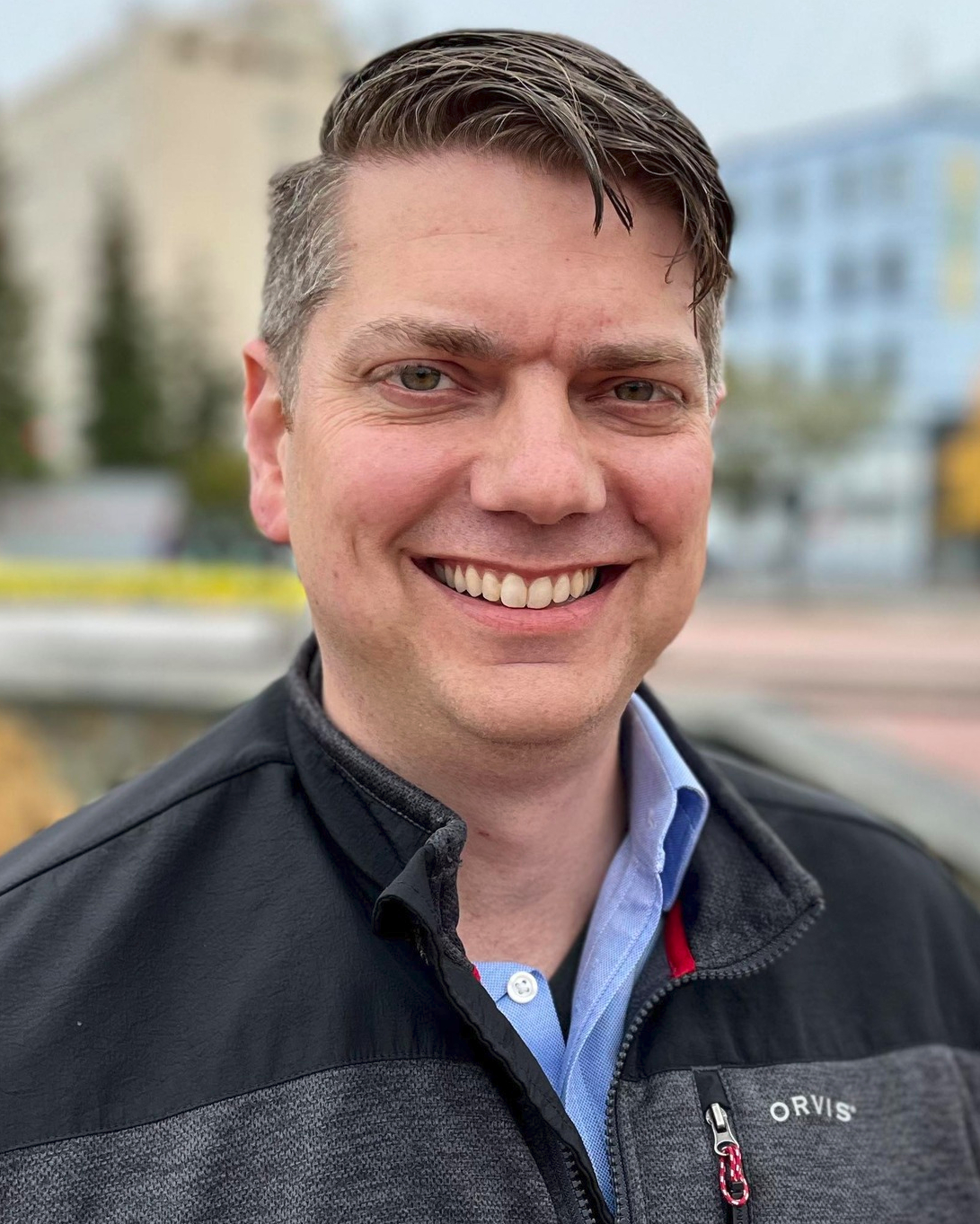
Candidate	Mary Peltola	Sarah Palin	Nick Begich III
Party	Democratic	Republican	Republican
First round	128,553; 48.77%	67,866; 25.74%	61,513; 23.33%
Maximum round	137,263; 54.96%	112,471; 45.04%	Eliminated
- Peltola: 50–60% 60–70% 70–80% 80–90% >90% Palin: 50–60% 60–70% 70–80%
U.S. Representative before election
Mary Peltola
Democratic
Elected U.S. Representative
Mary Peltola
Democratic

The November 2022 United States House of Representatives election in Alaska was held on Tuesday, November 8, to elect a member of the United States House of Representatives to represent the state of Alaska. Democratic incumbent Mary Peltola won re-election to a full term in office, defeating Republicans Sarah Palin and Nick Begich III and Libertarian Chris Bye in the runoff count.

This was the second race in Alaska held under the 2020 Measure 2 election procedure. Earlier that year, a special election was held to complete the term of Don Young, who had died in office in March 2022. Peltola won the special election.

In the race for the full term in the congressional seat, all candidates first ran in a nonpartisan blanket top-four primary. Each voter cast a single vote to choose who would advance to the runoff. Mary Peltola, Sarah Palin, Nick Begich III, and Chris Bye (Note: Bye replaced fourth-place finisher Tara Sweeney after she dropped out of the race.) advanced to the runoff.

Under the rules of an instant runoff, Bye and Begich were eliminated in the first and second rounds, after they received the fewest votes. These votes were then transferred to either Peltola or Palin, depending on who the voter ranked higher on their ballot. Peltola won with 55% of the vote, increasing her margin from the special election.

Peltola's final-round vote share of 55% was the best performance for a statewide Democratic candidate in Alaska since the 1974 Senate race, and the best performance for any statewide candidate in Alaska since the 2012 House race. Peltola was one of only five House Democrats in the 2022 midterm elections who won (or flipped) a district that Donald Trump had carried in the 2020 presidential election. (Note: The others were Marcy Kaptur, Jared Golden, Matt Cartwright, and Marie Gluesenkamp Perez.) She outran Joe Biden's vote margin by 20 points, the best overperformance of any House Democrat in the midterms.

Peltola won the election in the final round, with a majority of voters ranking her over Palin. Peltola was defeated for re-election by Begich in a rematch in 2024.

== Primary election ==
=== Democratic Party ===
==== Advanced to general ====
- Mary Peltola, incumbent U.S. representative and former state representative

==== Withdrew ====
- Christopher Constant, Anchorage Assembly member (endorsed Peltola)
- Mike Milligan, former Kodiak Island Borough Assembly member, Green nominee for this district in 1992 and for lieutenant governor in 1998 (endorsed Peltola)
- Adam Wool, state representative

==== Declined ====
- Les Gara, former state representative (running for governor)
- Elvi Gray-Jackson, state senator
- Emil Notti, engineer, former commissioner of the Alaska Department of Commerce, Community and Economic Development, former chair of the Alaska Democratic Party, nominee for this district in 1973, and candidate for this district in the 2022 special election

=== Republican Party ===
==== Advanced to general ====
- Nick Begich III, Alaska Policy Forum board member, grandson of former U.S. Representative Nick Begich Sr., and nephew of former U.S. senator Mark Begich and Alaska Senate Minority Leader Tom Begich
- Sarah Palin, former governor of Alaska (2006–2009) and nominee for vice president of the United States in 2008

==== Withdrew after advancing to general ====
- Tara Sweeney, former assistant secretary of the interior for Indian affairs

==== Eliminated in primary ====
- Jay Armstrong
- Robert "Bob" Lyons, case manager
- Randy Purham, businessman and U.S. Army veteran
- Brad Snowden
- Denise Williams

==== Withdrawn ====
- John Coghill, former majority leader of the Alaska Senate, former majority leader of the Alaska House of Representatives, son of former lieutenant governor Jack Coghill, and U.S. Air Force veteran (endorsed Begich)
- Mikel Melander
- Josh Revak, state senator and U.S. Army veteran
- Jesse Sumner, Matanuska-Susitna Borough Assembly member

==== Declined ====
- Mead Treadwell, former lieutenant governor of Alaska (endorsed Palin and Sweeney)

=== Libertarian Party ===
==== Advanced to general ====
- Chris Bye, fishing guide

==== Eliminated in primary ====
- J. R. Myers, founder of the Alaska Constitution Party and its nominee for governor in 2014

=== Alaskan Independence Party ===
==== Declined ====
- John Howe, machinist and nominee for U.S. Senate in 2020 (ran for governor)

=== American Independent Party ===
==== Eliminated in primary ====
- Robert Ornelas, pastor and perennial candidate

=== Independents ===
==== Eliminated in primary ====
- Gregg Brelsford, lawyer and former Bristol Bay Borough manager
- Lady Donna Dutchess, judicial reform activist
- Ted Heintz
- David Hughes
- David LeBlanc
- Sherry Mettler
- Silvio Pellegrini, businessman
- Andrew Phelps
- Sherry Strizak
- Tremayne Wilson

==== Withdrawn ====
- Al Gross, orthopedic surgeon, commercial fisherman, son of former Alaska attorney general Avrum Gross, and Democratic-endorsed nominee for U.S. Senate in 2020 (endorsed Peltola and Sweeney)
- William Hibler III, former glaciologist with the University of Alaska Fairbanks and Democratic candidate for this district in 2016 and 2020
- Jeff Lowenfels, attorney and gardening writer

==== Declined ====
- Santa Claus, North Pole city councillor and candidate for this district in the 2022 special election (endorsed Peltola)
- Andrew Halcro, former Republican state representative, candidate for governor of Alaska in 2006, and candidate for this district in the 2022 special election

=== Results ===
Primary election results
Party	Candidate	Votes	%
Democratic	Mary Peltola	70,295	36.80
Republican	Sarah Palin	57,693	30.20
Republican	Nick Begich III	50,021	26.19
Republican	Tara Sweeney (withdrew)	7,195	3.77
Libertarian	Chris Bye (Note: Chris Bye placed fifth in the nonpartisan primary. However, the fourth-place finisher — Tara Sweeney — withdrew, placing Bye in the general election.)	1,189	0.62
Libertarian	J. R. Myers	531	0.28
Republican	Bob Lyons	447	0.23
Republican	Jay Armstrong	403	0.21
Republican	Brad Snowden	355	0.19
Republican	Randy Purham	311	0.16
Independent	Lady Donna Dutchess	270	0.14
Independent	Sherry Strizak	252	0.13
American Independent	Robert Ornelas	248	0.13
Republican	Denise Williams	242	0.13
Independent	Gregg Brelsford	241	0.13
Independent	David Hughes	238	0.12
Independent	Andrew Phelps	222	0.12
Independent	Tremayne Wilson	194	0.10
Independent	Sherry Mettler	191	0.10
Independent	Silvio Pellegrini	187	0.10
Independent	Ted Heintz	173	0.09
Independent	Davis LeBlanc	117	0.06
Total votes		191,015	100.00

== General election ==
=== Predictions ===
Source	Ranking	As of
The Cook Political Report	Lean D	November 1, 2022
Inside Elections	Lean D	November 3, 2022
Sabato's Crystal Ball	Lean D	November 2, 2022
Politico	Lean D	October 26, 2022
RCP	Tossup	November 3, 2022
Fox News	Lean D	November 1, 2022
DDHQ	Lean D	November 8, 2022
FiveThirtyEight	Tossup	November 3, 2022
The Economist	Lean D	November 2, 2022

=== Debates and forums ===
As of September 2022, there had been one debate featuring the general election candidates.

A little over an hour before results came in for the final round of the 2022 congressional special election, a debate was held for candidates for the full term in the House seat. All four candidates were included in the debate.

2022 Alaska U.S. representative debates
No.	Date	Host	Moderator	Link	Participants			
P Participant A Absent N Non-invitee I Invitee W Withdrawn								
P Participant A Absent N Non-invitee I Invitee W Withdrawn					Nick Begich III	Chris Bye	Sarah Palin	Mary Peltola
1	August 31, 2022	Alaska Oil and Gas Association	Dave Karp		P	P	P	P
2	October 4, 2022	Kodiak Chamber of Commerce/KMXT (FM)	Dan Rohr		P	P	P	P
3	October 10, 2022	Anchorage Chamber of Commerce	Julie Hasquet		P	P	A	P
4	October 21, 2022	Alaska Federation of Natives			P	P	P	P
5	October 26, 2022	Alaska Public Media/Alaska's News Source	Lori Townsend, Mike Ross		P	P	P	P

=== Endorsements ===
Nick Begich III (R)

State legislators

- Ben Carpenter, state representative from the 29th district (2019–2025)
- John Coghill, former majority leader of the Alaska Senate (2013–2016) from District B (2009–2021) and former majority leader of the Alaska House of Representatives (2003–2006) from the 11th district (1999–2009)
- Mike Cronk, state representative from the 6th district (2021–2025)
- Lynn Gattis, former state representative from the 9th district (2013–2017)
- Roger Holland, state senator from District N (2021–2023)
- Shelley Hughes, majority leader of the Alaska Senate (2021–2023) from District F (2017–2025), and former state representative from the 11th district (2012–2017)
- Kevin J. McCabe, state representative from the 8th district (2021–present)
- Ken McCarty, state representative from the 13th district (2021–2023)
- Thomas McKay, state representative from the 24th district (2021–2025)
- Charisse Millett, former minority leader of the Alaska House of Representatives (2017–2019) from the 30th district (2009–2019)
- Mike Shower, state senator from District E (2018–2025)
- Sarah Vance, state representative from the 31st district (2019–present)

Local officials

- Dave Bronson, mayor of Anchorage (2021–2024)
- Dan Sullivan, former mayor of Anchorage (2009–2015)

Individuals

- Jim Palin, former father-in-law of Sarah Palin

Organizations

- Alaska Outdoor Council
- Alaska Republican Party
- Americans for Prosperity Alaska
- Anchorage Young Republicans
- Associated Builders and Contractors, Alaska Chapter
- FreedomWorks for America
Chris Bye (L)

Organizations

- Libertarian Party of Alaska
Sarah Palin (R)

Executive branch officials

- Nikki Haley, former U.S. ambassador to the United Nations (2017–2018) and former governor of South Carolina (2011–2017)
- Donald Trump, 45th president of the United States (2017–2021)

U.S. representatives

- Elise Stefanik, U.S. representative from New York's 21st congressional district (2015–present)

Organizations

- Campaign for Working Families
- Log Cabin Republicans
Al Gross (I) (withdrawn)

State officials

- Tony Knowles, former governor of Alaska (1994–2002) and former mayor of Anchorage (1982–1987)
- Fran Ulmer, former lieutenant governor of Alaska (1994–2002), former state representative from the 3rd district (1987–1994), and former mayor of Juneau (1983–1985)

State legislators

- Hollis French, former state senator from District J (2003–2015)
- Beth Kerttula, former minority leader of the Alaska House of Representatives (2007–2014) from the 3rd district (1999–2014)
- Joe Paskvan, former state senator from District E (2009–2013)

Local officials

- Sally Smith, former mayor of Juneau (2000–2003) and former state representative from the 20th district (1977–1983)

Organizations

- 314 Action
Mary Peltola (D)

U.S. senators

- Lisa Murkowski, U.S. senator from Alaska (Republican)

State legislators

- Rick Halford, former president of the Alaska Senate (Republican)

Local officials

- Santa Claus, North Pole city councillor (2015–2018, 2019-2022) and current mayor pro tem (Independent)
- Christopher Constant, Anchorage Assembly member
- Mike Milligan, former Kodiak Island Borough Assembly member, Green nominee for this district in 1992 and for lieutenant governor in 1998

Individuals

- Al Gross, orthopedic surgeon, commercial fisherman, son of former Alaska Attorney General Avrum Gross, and Democratic-endorsed nominee for U.S. Senate in 2020 (Independent) (co-endorsement with Sweeney)
- Emil Notti, engineer, former commissioner of the Alaska Department of Commerce, former chair of the Alaska Democratic Party, and nominee for Alaska's at-large congressional district in 1973

Labor unions

- Alaska AFL–CIO
- National Education Association

Organizations

- Alaska Federation of Natives
- Human Rights Campaign
- Sealaska Corporation
Josh Revak (R) (withdrawn)

Individuals

- Anne Garland Young, widow of former U.S. Representative Don Young
Tara Sweeney (R) (withdrawn)

Executive branch officials

- Thomas J. Barrett, former U.S. deputy secretary of transportation (2007–2009) and retired U.S. Coast Guard vice admiral

State officials

- Mead Treadwell, former lieutenant governor of Alaska (2010–2014)

Individuals

- Al Gross, orthopedic surgeon, commercial fisherman, son of former Alaska Attorney General Avrum Gross, and Democratic-endorsed nominee for U.S. Senate in 2020 (Independent) (co-endorsement with Peltola)

Organizations

- ANCSA Regional Association
Declined to endorse

State legislators

- Adam Wool, state representative

=== Polling ===
Poll source	Date(s) administered	Sample size (Note: Key: A – all adults RV – registered voters LV – likely voters V – unclear)	Margin of error	RCV count	Mary Peltola (D)	Sarah Palin (R)	Nick Begich (R)	Chris Bye (L)	Undecided / Not Ranked / Other
Dittman Research	November 2–3, 2022	400 (LV)	± 4.9%						
Dittman Research	November 2–3, 2022	400 (LV)	± 4.9%	1	48%	25%	23%	3%	1% U 1% O
Dittman Research	November 2–3, 2022	400 (LV)	± 4.9%	2	49%	26%	25%	Elim	—
Dittman Research	November 2–3, 2022	400 (LV)	± 4.9%	3	56%	44%	Elim	Elim	—
Alaska Survey Research	October 19–22, 2022	1,276 (LV)	± 3.0%						
Alaska Survey Research	October 19–22, 2022	1,276 (LV)	± 3.0%	1	49%	26%	21%	5%	—
Alaska Survey Research	October 19–22, 2022	1,276 (LV)	± 3.0%	2	51%	27%	22%	Elim	—
Alaska Survey Research	October 19–22, 2022	1,276 (LV)	± 3.0%	3	57%	43%	Elim	Elim	—
Alaska Survey Research	October 19–22, 2022	1,276 (LV)	± 3.0%	3* (Note: Hypothetical scenario with Begich and Peltola as the top two based on expressed ranked choice preferences)	56%	Elim	44%	Elim	—
Dittman Research	October 4–8, 2022	411 (LV)	± 4.8%						
Dittman Research	October 4–8, 2022	411 (LV)	± 4.8%	1	45%	23%	28%	3%	—
Dittman Research	October 4–8, 2022	411 (LV)	± 4.8%	2	46%	24%	30%	Elim	—
Dittman Research	October 4–8, 2022	411 (LV)	± 4.8%	3	52%	Elim	48%	Elim	—
Alaska Survey Research	September 25–27, 2022	1,282 (LV)	± 3.0%						
Alaska Survey Research	September 25–27, 2022	1,282 (LV)	± 3.0%	1	49%	23%	26%	2%	—
Alaska Survey Research	September 25–27, 2022	1,282 (LV)	± 3.0%	2	50%	24%	26%	Elim	—
Alaska Survey Research	September 25–27, 2022	1,282 (LV)	± 3.0%	3	54%	Elim	46%	Elim	—
Alaska Survey Research	September 25–27, 2022	1,282 (LV)	± 3.0%	3* (Note: Hypothetical scenario with Palin and Peltola as the top two based on expressed ranked choice preferences)	56%	44%	Elim	Elim	—
Dittman Research	September 6–14, 2022	394 (LV)	± 4.9%						
Dittman Research	September 6–14, 2022	394 (LV)	± 4.9%	1	50%	27%	20%	3%	1% U 1% O
Dittman Research	September 6–14, 2022	394 (LV)	± 4.9%	2	51%	28%	21%	Elim	—
Dittman Research	September 6–14, 2022	394 (LV)	± 4.9%	3	58%	42%	Elim	Elim	—
Fabrizio Ward (R)/Impact Research (D) (Note: Poll sponsored by AARP)	September 6–11, 2022	1,050 (LV)	(Note: The margin of sampling error for the 500 statewide sample is ±4.4%; for the 840 total sample of voters 50+ is ±3.3%.)	N/A (Note: Standard polling question.)	45%	30%	20%	2%	3% U
Fabrizio Ward (R)/Impact Research (D)	September 6–11, 2022	1,050 (LV)	(Note: The margin of sampling error for the 500 statewide sample is ±4.4%; for the 840 total sample of voters 50+ is ±3.3%.)	1	46%	31%	20%	2%	3% NR
Fabrizio Ward (R)/Impact Research (D)	September 6–11, 2022	1,050 (LV)	(Note: The margin of sampling error for the 500 statewide sample is ±4.4%; for the 840 total sample of voters 50+ is ±3.3%.)	2	47%	32%	21%	Elim (Note: Bye eliminated. Vote transfer breakdown: 33% to Begich, 25% to Palin, 17% to Peltola, and 25% not ranked further.)	4% NR
Fabrizio Ward (R)/Impact Research (D)	September 6–11, 2022	1,050 (LV)	(Note: The margin of sampling error for the 500 statewide sample is ±4.4%; for the 840 total sample of voters 50+ is ±3.3%.)	3	53%	47%	Elim (Note: Begich eliminated. Vote transfer breakdown: 56% to Palin, 14% to Peltola, 30% not ranked further.)	Elim	10% NR

Hypothetical polling

Poll source	Date(s) administered	Sample size	Margin of error	RCV count	Nick Begich (R)	Sarah Palin (R)	Mary Peltola (D)	Tara Sweeney (R)	Undecided
Alaska Survey Research	July 20–25, 2022	1,253 (LV)	± 3.0%	1	26%	27%	39%	8%	–
Alaska Survey Research	July 20–25, 2022	1,253 (LV)	± 3.0%	2	29%	29%	42%	Elim	–
Alaska Survey Research	July 20–25, 2022	1,253 (LV)	± 3.0%	3	54%	Elim	46%	Elim	–
Alaska Survey Research	July 20–25, 2022	1,253 (LV)	± 3.0%	3* (Note: Hypothetical scenario with Palin and Peltola as the top two based on expressed ranked choice preferences)	Elim	48%	53%	Elim	–
Alaska Survey Research	July 2–5, 2022	1,201 (LV)	± 2.9%	1	27%	27%	38%	8%	–
Alaska Survey Research	July 2–5, 2022	1,201 (LV)	± 2.9%	2	31%	29%	41%	Elim	–
Alaska Survey Research	July 2–5, 2022	1,201 (LV)	± 2.9%	3	56%	Elim	44%	Elim	–

=== Results ===
Preference flow

2022 Alaska's at-large congressional district election
Party	Candidate	First choice		Round 1			Round 2			Round 3	
Party	Candidate	Votes	%	Votes	%	Transfer	Votes	%	Transfer	Votes	%
Democratic	Mary Peltola (incumbent)	128,553	48.77%	128,755	48.66%	+1,031	129,786	49.22%	+7,477	137,263	54.96%
Republican	Sarah Palin	67,866	25.74%	68,330	25.82%	+1,069	69,399	26.32%	+43,072	112,471	45.04%
Republican	Nick Begich III	61,513	23.33%	62,505	23.62%	+1,994	64,499	24.46%	-64,499	Eliminated	
Libertarian	Chris Bye	4,570	1.73%	4,999	1.89%	-4,999	Eliminated				
Write-in		1,108	0.42%	Eliminated							
Total votes		263,610		264,589 (Note: 259 ballots from six rural villages did not reach state election headquarters before the November 30 certification deadline. Consequently, only their first-choice votes were recorded, while their subsequent preferences were excluded from the ranked-choice tabulation.)			263,684			249,734	
Inactive ballots (Note: Includes blank ballots, overvotes, and exhausted ballots where another continuing candidate was not ranked.)		3,437		2,208		+905	3,113		+13,950	17,063	
Democratic hold											

== See also ==
- 2022 United States House of Representatives elections
- 2022 United States Senate election in Alaska
- 2022 Alaska gubernatorial election
- 2022 Alaska Senate election
- 2022 Alaska House of Representatives election

== Notes ==
Partisan clients
