= 2022 United States Senate election in Alaska =

- November 8, 2022
- Turnout: 44.38%
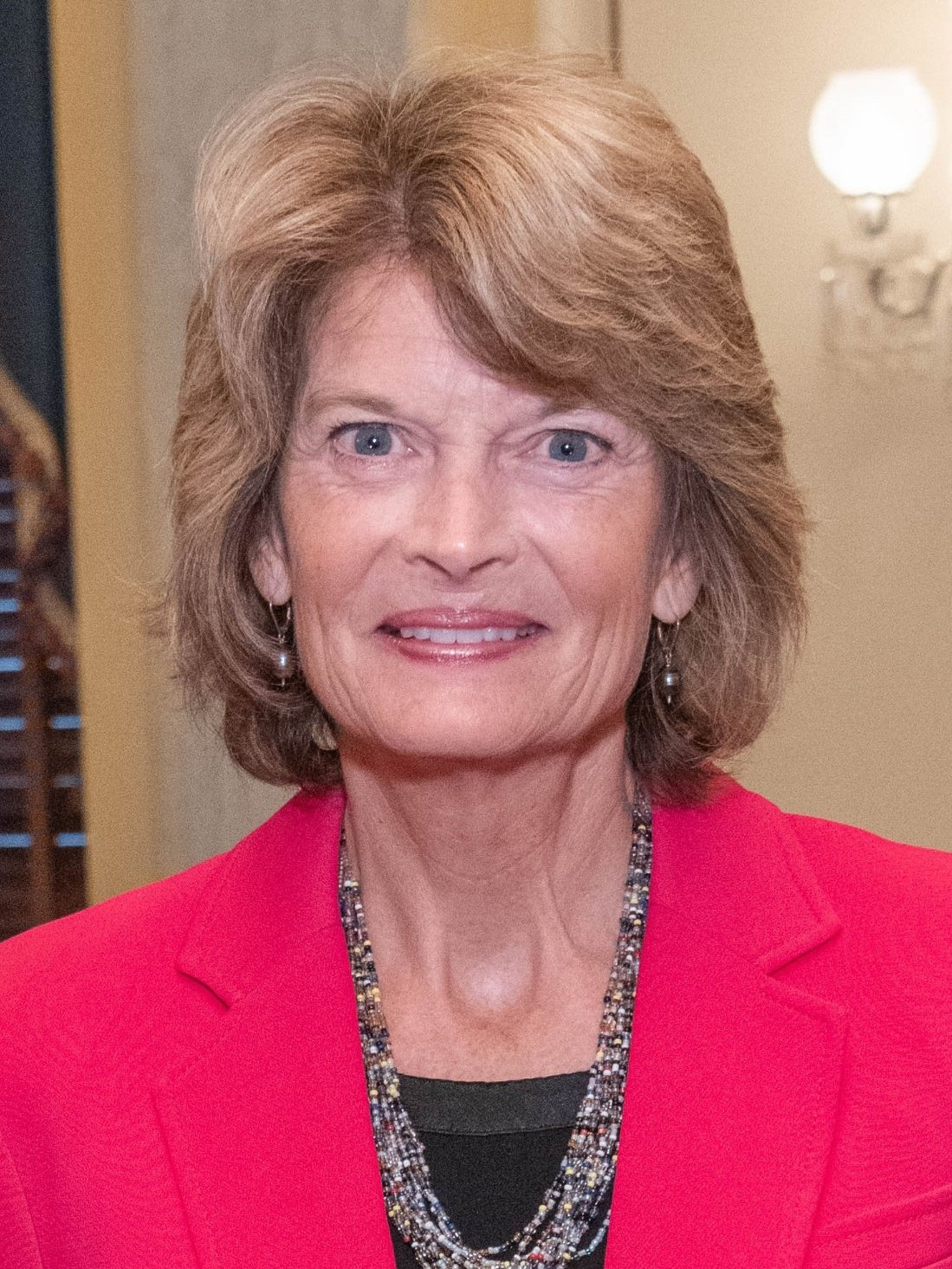

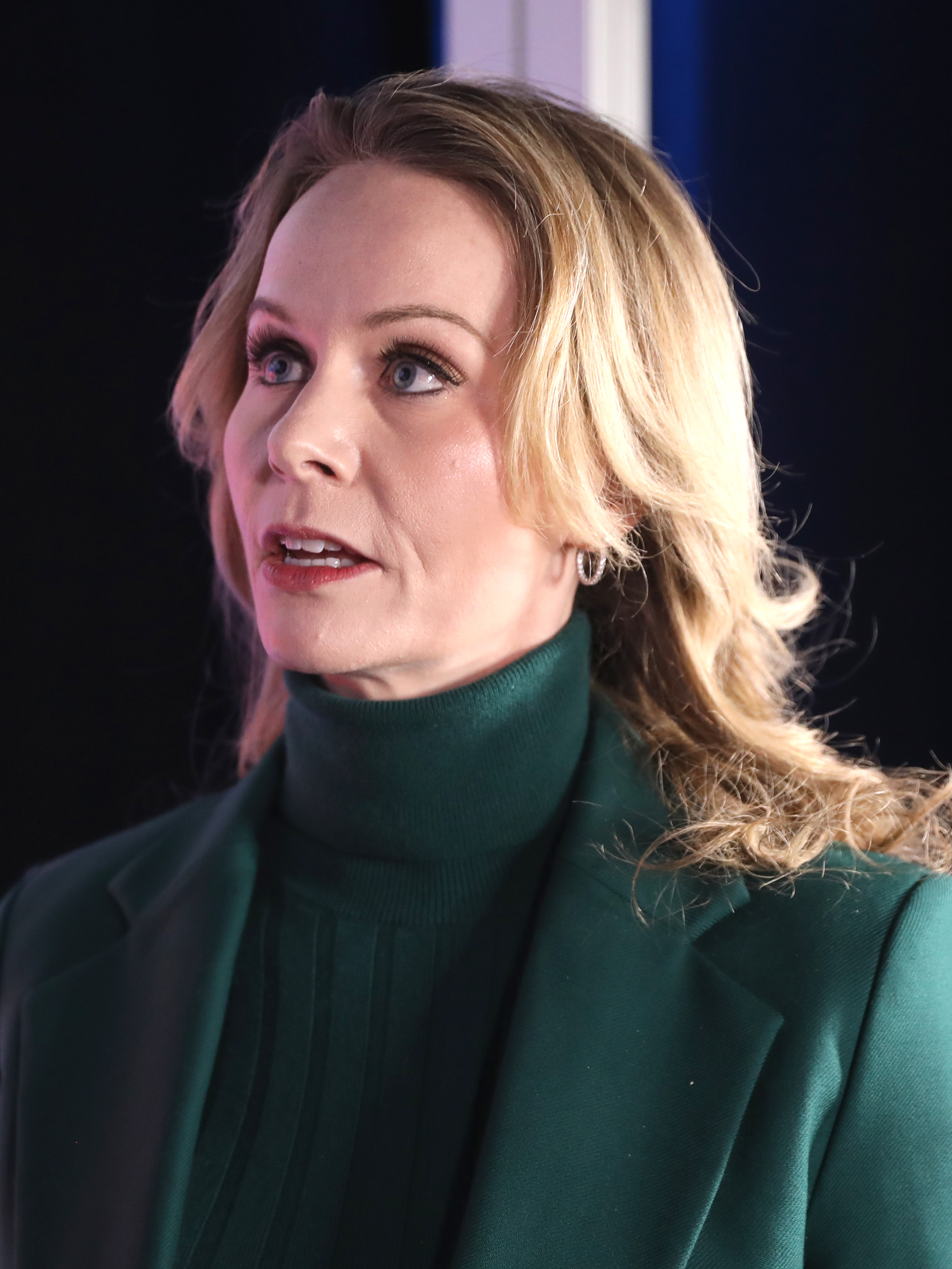

Candidate	Lisa Murkowski	Kelly Tshibaka	Pat Chesbro
Party	Republican	Republican	Democratic
First round	113,495; 43.37%	111,480; 42.60%	27,145; 10.37%
Final round	136,330; 53.70%	117,534; 46.30%	Eliminated
- Murkowski: 50–60% 60–70% 70–80% 80–90% Tshibaka: 50–60% 60–70% 70–80%
U.S. senator before election
Lisa Murkowski
Republican
Elected U.S. senator
Lisa Murkowski
Republican

The 2022 United States Senate election in Alaska was held on November 8, 2022. Incumbent Republican senator Lisa Murkowski won reelection to a fourth full term, defeating fellow Republican Kelly Tshibaka and Democrat Patricia Chesbro.

This was the first U.S. Senate election in Alaska to be held under a new election process provided for in Ballot Measure 2. All candidates ran in a nonpartisan blanket top-four primary on August 16, 2022, and the top four candidates advanced to the general election, where voters utilized ranked-choice voting.

Murkowski had been a vocal critic of Donald Trump during his presidency and opposed several of his initiatives. Murkowski was one of seven Republican senators who voted to convict Trump in his second impeachment trial in 2021, and was the only one up for re-election in 2022. On March 16, 2021, the Alaska Republican Party voted to censure Murkowski and announced that it would recruit a Republican challenger in the 2022 election cycle. Kelly Tshibaka, a former commissioner of the Alaska Department of Administration, was endorsed by Trump and the Alaska Republican Party. Republican Senate leader Mitch McConnell and the National Republican Senatorial Committee supported Murkowski.

In addition to Murkowski and Tshibaka, Democrat Pat Chesbro and Republican Buzz Kelley also advanced to the general election. On September 13, Kelley suspended his campaign and endorsed Tshibaka but remained on the ballot. Murkowski received a plurality of first-place votes; however, because no candidate received a majority of the votes in the first round, an instant runoff was triggered. Murkowski won reelection in the third and final round, winning most of the second-choice votes from Chesbro's voters.

== Primary election ==
=== Republican Party ===
==== Advanced to general ====
- Lisa Murkowski, incumbent U.S. senator
- Kelly Tshibaka, former commissioner of the Alaska Department of Administration

==== Withdrew after advancing to general ====
- Buzz Kelley, retired mechanic (remained on ballot; endorsed Tshibaka) (Note: Remained on the ballot because he withdrew after the deadline of 64 days ahead of the election.)

==== Eliminated in primary ====
- Sam Merrill, businessman
- Pat Nolin, mechanic
- John Schiess, perennial candidate
- Kendall L. Shorkey
- Karl Speights, retired U.S. Air Force officer and advisor to Donald Trump's 2020 presidential campaign

==== Disqualified ====
- Sam Little, musician, truck driver, National Guard veteran and candidate for governor of Alaska in 2010

==== Declined ====
- Mike Dunleavy, governor of Alaska (ran for re-election)
- Bob Lochner, mechanic and candidate for U.S. Senate in 2016
- Sarah Palin, former governor of Alaska and nominee for vice president of the United States in 2008 (ran for U.S. House)

=== Democratic Party ===
==== Advanced to general ====
- Pat Chesbro, teacher

==== Eliminated in primary ====
- Edgar Blatchford, professor, former mayor of Seward, and candidate for U.S. Senate in 2016 and 2020
- Ivan R. Taylor

==== Withdrew ====
- Elvi Gray-Jackson, state senator for District I and former Anchorage Assembly member (ran for re-election)

=== Libertarian Party ===
==== Eliminated in primary ====
- Sean Thorne, veteran

=== Alaskan Independence Party ===
==== Eliminated in primary ====
- Dustin Darden, city maintenance worker and perennial candidate
- Joe Stephens

==== Declined ====
- John Howe, machinist and nominee for U.S. Senate in 2020 (ran for governor)

=== Independents ===
==== Eliminated in primary ====
- Dave Darden, perennial candidate
- Shoshana Gungurstein, businesswoman
- Sid Hill, political gadfly and candidate for U.S. Senate in 2014
- Jeremy Keller, television personality
- Huhnkie Lee, attorney, Army veteran and Republican candidate for Alaska Senate in 2020

==== Declined ====
- Al Gross, orthopedic surgeon, commercial fisherman, son of former Alaska Attorney General Avrum Gross, and candidate for U.S. Senate in 2020 (ran for U.S. House)

=== Results ===
Primary election results by state house district

Primary election results
Party	Candidate	Votes	%
Republican	Lisa Murkowski (incumbent)	85,794	45.05%
Republican	Kelly Tshibaka	73,414	38.55%
Democratic	Patricia Chesbro	12,989	6.82%
Republican	Buzz Kelley	4,055	2.13%
Republican	Pat Nolin	2,004	1.05%
Democratic	Edgar Blatchford	1,981	1.04%
Democratic	Ivan R. Taylor	1,897	1.00%
Republican	Sam Merrill	1,529	0.80%
Libertarian	Sean Thorne	1,399	0.73%
Independent	Shoshana Gungurstein	853	0.45%
Independence	Joe Stephens	805	0.42%
Republican	John Schiess	734	0.39%
Independence	Dustin Darden	649	0.34%
Republican	Kendall L. Shorkey	627	0.33%
Republican	Karl Speights	613	0.32%
Independent	Jeremy Keller	405	0.21%
Independent	Sid Hill	274	0.14%
Independent	Huhnkie Lee	238	0.12%
Independent	Dave Darden	198	0.10%
Total votes		190,458	100.0%

== General election ==
=== Predictions ===
Source	Ranking	As of
The Cook Political Report	Solid R	March 4, 2022
Inside Elections	Solid R	April 1, 2022
Sabato's Crystal Ball	Safe R	March 1, 2022
Politico	Solid R	September 5, 2022
RCP	Safe R	September 15, 2022
Fox News	Solid R	May 12, 2022
DDHQ	Solid R	July 20, 2022
FiveThirtyEight	Solid R	October 24, 2022
The Economist	Safe R	September 7, 2022

=== Debates and forums ===
2022 United States Senate election in Alaska debates
No.	Date	Host	Link	Participants			
P Participant A Absent N Non-invitee I Invitee W Withdrawn							
P Participant A Absent N Non-invitee I Invitee W Withdrawn				Lisa Murkowski	Kelly Tshibaka	Patricia Chesbro	Buzz Kelley
1	September 1, 2022	Denaʼina Civic and Convention Center; Alaska Oil and Gas Association; Anchorage Daily News		P	P	P	A
2	October 10, 2022	Anchorage Chamber of Commerce		P	P	P	W

=== Endorsements ===
Pat Chesbro (D)

Organizations

- The Alaska Center
- Alaska Democratic Party
Lisa Murkowski (R)

Executive branch officials

- George W. Bush, 43rd president of the United States (2001–2009)

Governors

- Larry Hogan, governor of Maryland (2015–2023)
- Bill Walker, governor of Alaska (2014–2018) (Independent)

U.S. senators

- John Barrasso, U.S. senator from Wyoming (2007–present)
- Susan Collins, U.S. senator from Maine (1997–present)
- John Cornyn, U.S. senator from Texas (2002–present)
- Joni Ernst, U.S. senator from Iowa (2015–present)
- Angus King, U.S. senator from Maine (2013–present) (Independent)
- Joe Manchin, U.S. senator from West Virginia (2010–2025) (Democratic)
- Mitch McConnell, U.S. senator from Kentucky (1985–present), Senate minority leader (2021–2025, 2007–2015), and former Senate majority leader (2015–2021)
- Rick Scott, U.S. senator from Florida (2019–present)
- Tim Scott, U.S. senator from South Carolina (2013–present)
- Kyrsten Sinema, U.S. senator from Arizona (2019–2025) (Democratic)
- Dan Sullivan, U.S. senator from Alaska (2015–present)
- Brian Schatz, U.S. senator from Hawaii (2012–present) (Democratic)
- Jeanne Shaheen, U.S. senator from New Hampshire (2009–present) (Democratic)
- John Thune, U.S. senator from South Dakota (2005–present), Senate minority whip (2021–2025), and former Senate majority whip (2019–2021)
- Mark Warner, U.S. senator from Virginia (2009–present) (Democratic)

U.S. representatives

- Adam Kinzinger, U.S. representative from Illinois's 16th congressional district; formerly 17th district (2011–2023)
- Mary Peltola, U.S. representative from Alaska's at-large congressional district (2022–2025) (Democratic)

State Legislators

- Bryce Edgmon, state representative (Independent)
- Zack Fields, state representative (Democratic)
- Neal Foster, state representative (Democratic)
- Dan Ortiz, state representative (Independent)
- Gary Stevens, state senator
- Louise Stutes, state representative, speaker of the Alaska House of Representatives
- Natasha von Imhof, state senator
- Adam Wool, state representative (Democratic)

Newspapers

- Anchorage Daily News
- The Wrangell Sentinel

Organizations

- Alaska Federation of Natives
- American Conservation Coalition
- AIPAC
- ANCSA Regional Association
- Citizens for Responsible Energy Solutions
- ClearPath Action Fund
- Forward Party
- Log Cabin Republicans
- National Education Association – Alaska
- National Republican Senatorial Committee
- Pro-Israel America
- Renew America Movement
- United Fishermen of Alaska
- United States Chamber of Commerce

Labor unions

- Alaska AFL–CIO
- Alaska Professional Firefighters Association
- Alaska Teamsters Local 959
- Carpenters Local Union 1281
- Inlandboatmen's Union of the Pacific – Alaska
- International Longshore and Warehouse Union – Alaska
- Laborers' International Union of North America
Kelly Tshibaka (R)

Executive branch officials

- Donald Trump, 45th president of the United States (2017–2021)

Governors

- Kristi Noem, governor of South Dakota (2019–2025)
- Sarah Palin, governor of Alaska (2006–2009), candidate for Alaska's at-large congressional district in 2022 and nominee for Vice President of the United States in 2008

Local officials

- Edgar Blatchford, former mayor of Seward (1999–2003), candidate for the U.S. Senate in 2016, 2022 and lieutenant governor in 2018 (Democratic)

Individuals

- Tuckerman Babcock, political strategist and former chair of the Alaska Republican Party (2016–2018)
- Buzz Kelley, candidate for the U.S. Senate in 2022 and retired mechanic
- Charlie Kirk, political activist and founder of Turning Point USA
- Donald Trump Jr., businessman and son of former President Donald Trump

Organizations

- Alaska Outdoor Council PAC
- Alaska Republican Party
- American Conservative Union
- Campaign for Working Families
- Family Research Council Action PAC
- Maggie's List
- Oil and Gas Workers' Association
- Susan B. Anthony List

=== Polling ===
Poll source	Date(s) administered	Sample size (Note: Key: A – all adults RV – registered voters LV – likely voters V – unclear)	Margin of error	RCV count	Lisa Murkowski (R)	Kelly Tshibaka (R)	Pat Chesbro (D)	Buzz Kelley (R)	Undecided / Not Ranked
Alaska Survey Research	October 19–22, 2022	1,276 (LV)	±3.0%						
Alaska Survey Research	October 19–22, 2022	1,276 (LV)	±3.0%	1	41%	39%	16%	4%	—
Alaska Survey Research	October 19–22, 2022	1,276 (LV)	±3.0%	2	42%	41%	17%	— (Note: Kelley eliminated.)	—
Alaska Survey Research	October 19–22, 2022	1,276 (LV)	±3.0%	3	56%	44%	– (Note: Chesbro eliminated.)	—	—
Alaska Survey Research	September 25–27, 2022	1,282 (LV)	±3.0%						
Alaska Survey Research	September 25–27, 2022	1,282 (LV)	±3.0%	1	41%	39%	16%	4%	—
Alaska Survey Research	September 25–27, 2022	1,282 (LV)	±3.0%	2	42%	41%	17%	—	—
Alaska Survey Research	September 25–27, 2022	1,282 (LV)	±3.0%	3	57%	43%	–	—	—
Fabrizio Ward (R)/Impact Research (D) (Note: Poll sponsored by AARP)	September 6–11, 2022	1,050 (LV)	(Note: The margin of sampling error for the 500 statewide sample is ±4.4%; for the 840 total sample of voters 50+ is ±3.3%.)	N/A (Note: Standard polling question.)	35%	43%	13%	1%	7% U
Fabrizio Ward (R)/Impact Research (D)	September 6–11, 2022	1,050 (LV)	(Note: The margin of sampling error for the 500 statewide sample is ±4.4%; for the 840 total sample of voters 50+ is ±3.3%.)	1	38%	46%	14%	2%	7% NR
Fabrizio Ward (R)/Impact Research (D)	September 6–11, 2022	1,050 (LV)	(Note: The margin of sampling error for the 500 statewide sample is ±4.4%; for the 840 total sample of voters 50+ is ±3.3%.)	2	38%	47%	14%	– (Note: Kelley eliminated. Vote transfer breakdown: 29% to Tshibaka and 71% not ranked further.)	8% NR
Fabrizio Ward (R)/Impact Research (D)	September 6–11, 2022	1,050 (LV)	(Note: The margin of sampling error for the 500 statewide sample is ±4.4%; for the 840 total sample of voters 50+ is ±3.3%.)	3	50%	50%	– (Note: Chesbro eliminated. Vote transfer breakdown: 77% to Murkowski, 8% to Tshibaka, and 15% not ranked further.)	–	10% NR

Hypothetical polling

Poll source	Date(s) administered	Sample size	Margin of error	RCV count	Pat Chesbro (D)	Dustin Darden (AIP)	Elvi Gray-Jackson (D)	Al Gross (D/I)	John Howe (AIP)	Joe Miller (L)	Lisa Murkowski (R)	Sarah Palin (R)	Kelly Tshibaka (R)	Other	Undecided
Alaska Survey Research	July 2–5, 2022	1,201 (LV)	± 2.9%	1	17%	5%	–				35%	–	43%	–	
Alaska Survey Research	July 2–5, 2022	1,201 (LV)	± 2.9%	2	20%	–	–				36%	–	45%	–	
Alaska Survey Research	July 2–5, 2022	1,201 (LV)	± 2.9%	3	–	–	–				52%	–	48%	–	
Cygnal (R) (Note: This poll was sponsored by Kelly Tshibaka's campaign.)	March 14–16, 2022	500 (LV)	± 4.2%	1	–						29%	–	45%	26%	–
Cygnal (R)	March 14–16, 2022	500 (LV)	± 4.2%	?	–						49%	–	51%	–	
Alaska Survey Research	October 22–27, 2021	969 (RV)	± 3.2%	1	–		22%	–			35%	20%	23%	–	
Alaska Survey Research	October 22–27, 2021	969 (RV)	± 3.2%	2	–		23%	–			42%	–	35%	–	
Alaska Survey Research	October 22–27, 2021	969 (RV)	± 3.2%	3	–		–	–			60%	–	40%	–	
Alaska Survey Research	July 11–21, 2021	947 (LV)	± 3.2%	1	–		19%	–		18%	36%	–	27%	–	
Alaska Survey Research	July 11–21, 2021	947 (LV)	± 3.2%	2	–		21%	–		–	39%	–	40%	–	
Alaska Survey Research	July 11–21, 2021	947 (LV)	± 3.2%	3	–		–	–		–	55%	–	45%	–	
Change Research (D) (Note: This poll was sponsored by 314 Action.)	May 22–25, 2021	1,023 (LV)	± 3.1%	BA	–			25%	4%	–	19%	–	39%	1% (Note: Would not vote with 1%)	12%
Change Research (D)	May 22–25, 2021	1,023 (LV)	± 3.1%	3 (Note: Excluding undecided voters)	–			46%	–	–	–	–	54%	–	

Lisa Murkowski vs. Kelly Tshibaka

Poll source	Date(s) administered	Sample size	Margin of error	Lisa Murkowski (R)	Kelly Tshibaka (R)	Undecided
Alaska Survey Research	April 16–21, 2022	1,208 (LV)	± 2.9%	55%	45%	–

=== Results ===
Preference flow

2022 United States Senate election in Alaska
Party	Candidate	First choice		Round 1			Round 2			Round 3	
Party	Candidate	Votes	%	Votes	%	Transfer	Votes	%	Transfer	Votes	%
Republican	Lisa Murkowski (incumbent)	113,495	43.37%	114,118	43.39%	+1,641	115,759	44.49%	+20,571	136,330	53.70%
Republican	Kelly Tshibaka	111,480	42.60%	112,101	42.62%	+3,209	115,310	44.32%	+2,224	117,534	46.30%
Democratic	Pat Chesbro	27,145	10.37%	28,233	10.73%	+901	29,134	11.20%	-29,134	Eliminated	
Republican	Buzz Kelley (withdrew)	7,557	2.89%	8,575	3.26%	-8,575	Eliminated				
Write-in		2,028	0.77%	Eliminated							
Total votes		261,705		263,027 (Note: 259 ballots from six rural villages did not reach state election headquarters before the November 30 certification deadline. Consequently, only their first-choice votes were recorded, while their subsequent preferences were excluded from the ranked-choice tabulation.)			260,203			253,864	
Inactive ballots (Note: Includes blank ballots, overvotes, and exhausted ballots where another continuing candidate was not ranked. 259 ballots from six rural villages did not reach state election headquarters before the November 30 certification deadline. Consequently, only their first-choice votes were recorded, while their subsequent preferences were excluded from the ranked-choice tabulation.)		5,342		3,770		+2,824	6,594		+6,339	12,933	
Republican hold											

== See also ==
- 2022 United States Senate elections
- 2022 United States House of Representatives election in Alaska
- 2022 Alaska gubernatorial election
- 2022 Alaska Senate election
- 2022 Alaska House of Representatives election
- 2022 Alaska elections

== Notes ==
Partisan clients
