= 2022 Alaska elections =

- November 8, 2022

The 2022 Alaska state elections took place on November 8, 2022. The state also held Regional Educational Attendance Area (REAA) elections on the first Tuesday in October.

== Federal elections ==
=== United States Senate Seat (Class III) ===
Incumbent Republican U.S. Senator Lisa Murkowski was originally appointed to the Senate in 2002, winning subsequent elections in 2004, 2010, and 2016.

Under Alaska's recently adopted election system, the state conducted a nonpartisan blanket primary. Murkowski finished first (with 45.05% of the vote), ahead of Republican Kelly Tshibaka (38.55%), Democrat Pat Chesbro (6.82%), and Republican Buzz Kelly (2.13%). Murkowski, Tshibaka, Chesbro, and Kelly all advanced to the ranked-choice general election.

In the first round of tabulation in the general election, Murkowski finished first (with 43.37% of the vote); Tshibaka finished in a close second (42.60%). Chesbro received 10.37% of the vote, while Buzz Kelly received 2.89%.

Murkowski won the election with 53.70% of the vote in the third round of tabulation.

2022 United States Senate election in Alaska
Party	Candidate	First choice			Round 1			Round 2			Round 3	
Party	Candidate	Votes	%	Transfer	Votes	%	Transfer	Votes	%	Transfer	Votes	%
Republican	Lisa Murkowski (incumbent)	113,495	43.37%	+623	114,118	43.39%	+1,641	115,759	44.49%	+20,571	136,330	53.70%
Republican	Kelly Tshibaka	111,480	42.60%	+621	112,101	42.62%	+3,209	115,310	44.32%	+2,224	117,534	46.30%
Democratic	Pat Chesbro	27,145	10.37%	+1,088	28,233	10.73%	+901	29,134	11.20%	−29,134	Eliminated	
Republican	Buzz Kelley (withdrew) (Note: Remained on the ballot because of his withdrawal after the deadline of 64 days ahead of the election.)	7,557	2.89%	+1,018	8,575	3.26%	−8,575	Eliminated				
Write-in		2,028	0.77%	-2,028	Eliminated							
Total votes		261,705			263,027			260,203			253,864	
Blank or inactive ballots					3,770		+2,824	6,594		+6,339	12,933	
Republican hold												

=== United States House of Representatives ===
==== Special election ====
Incumbent Republican representative Don Young died on March 18, 2022, after serving as representative for 49 years. A special election was held on August 16 to fill the rest of his term, resulting in Democrat Mary Peltola beating Republicans Sarah Palin and Nick Begich using the state's newly implemented ranked-choice voting system.

2022 Alaska's at-large congressional district special election
Party	Candidate	Round 1			Round 3	
Party	Candidate	Votes	%	Transfer	Votes	%
Democratic	Mary Peltola	74,817	39.66%	+16,449	91,266	51.48%
Republican	Sarah Palin	58,339	30.92%	+27,687	86,026	48.52%
Republican	Nick Begich	52,536	27.84%	-52,536	Eliminated	
Write-in		2,974	1.58%	-2,974	Eliminated	
Total valid votes		188,666	100.00%		177,423	100.00%
Inactive ballots		3,876	2.01%	+11,374	15,250	7.92%
Democratic gain from Republican						

==== General election ====
Peltola ran for election to a full-term, again against Palin and Begich. Republican Tara Sweeney originally placed fourth in the nonpartisan blanket primary, but withdrew. She was replaced by Libertarian Chris Bye, who finished the primary in fifth place.

In the first round of general election voting, Peltola came in first with 48.77% of the vote to Palin's 25.74%, Begich's 23.33%, and Bye's 1.73%. In the third round, Peltola won the election with 54.96% of the vote.

2022 Alaska's at-large congressional district election
Party	Candidate	Round 1			Round 2			Round 3	
Party	Candidate	Votes	%	Transfer	Votes	%	Transfer	Votes	%
Democratic	Mary Peltola (incumbent)	128,553	48.77%	+1,233	129,786	49.22%	+7,477	137,263	54.96%
Republican	Sarah Palin	67,866	25.74%	+1,533	69,399	26.32%	+43,072	112,471	45.04%
Republican	Nick Begich	61,513	23.33%	+2,986	64,499	24.46%	-64,499	Eliminated	
Libertarian	Chris Bye	4,570	1.73%	-4,570	Eliminated				
Write-in		1,108	0.42%	-1,108	Eliminated				
Total votes		263,610	100.00%		263,684	100.00%		249,734	100.00%
Inactive ballots		2,208	0.83%	+905	3,113	1.17%	+13,950	17,063	6.41%
Democratic hold									

== State offices ==
=== Governor ===
Incumbent Republican governor Mike Dunleavy was originally elected to the position in 2018 with 51.4% of the vote. He ran for re-election in 2022.

In Alaska's nonpartisan blanket primary, Dunleavy and his running mate, former commissioner of the Alaska Department of Corrections Nancy Dahlstrom, finished first with 40.43% of the vote. Former Democratic state representative Les Gara and Jessica Cook came in second place, with 23.06% of the vote; independent former Alaska governor Bill Walker and Heidi Drygas finished in third place with 22.77% of the vote.

Dunleavy and Dahlstrom won the general election in the first round of ranked-choice voting with 50.29% of the vote.

2022 Alaska gubernatorial election
Party	Candidate	Votes	%	±%
Republican	Mike Dunleavy (incumbent); Nancy Dahlstrom	132,632	50.29%	−1.15%
Democratic	Les Gara; Jessica Cook	63,851	24.21%	−20.20%
Independent	Bill Walker; Heidi Drygas	54,668	20.73%	+18.70%
Republican	Charlie Pierce; Edie Grunwald (withdrew) (Note: Suspended her campaign and endorsed Dunleavy on October 25, 2022 after allegations of sexual harassment against Pierce but remained on the ballot.)	11,817	4.48%	N/A
Write-in		784	0.30%	+0.09%
Total votes		263,752	100.0%	
Turnout		266,472	44.33%	−5.49%
Registered electors		601,161		
Republican hold				

=== State judiciary ===
==== Court of Appeals ====
Incumbent Alaska Court of Appeals judge Bethany Harbison was appointed by Governor Bill Walker in 2018. Her term expired in February 2023 and she was up for retention, which she won and earned a full 10-year term.

Results by state house district Yes: 50–60%; 60–70%; 70–80%; 80–90%; No: 50–60%

Judge Harbison retention, 2022
Choice	Votes	%
For	134,620	61.58
Against	84,000	38.42
Total	218,620	100.00
Source: Alaska Division of Elections

=== State legislature ===
==== Alaska State Senate ====
19 of the state's 20 senate seats were up for election in 2022, with some elected for two-year terms and other for four-year terms due to redistricting. The Republican party lost two seats, while the Democratic party gained two seats for an eleven to nine seat split respectively. A bipartisan coalition of eight Republicans and nine Democrats was announced, electing Gary Stevens as Senate President.

Alaska State Senate
Party	Leader	Before	After	Change
Republican	Peter Micciche (retiring)	13	11	▼2
Democratic	Tom Begich (retiring)	7	9	▲2
Total		20	20	

==== Alaska House of Representatives ====
All 40 seats of the Alaska House of Representatives were up in this election. Since 2016, the house had been governed by a coalition of Democrats, Independents, and some Republicans. The coalition was re-elected to a majority, albeit with only 20 of the total 40 seats in the chamber, with 6 Independents and 1 Republican joining all 13 Democrats. Republican Cathy Tilton was elected speaker, replacing Republican Louise Stutes.

Alaska House of Representatives
Party	Leader	Before	After	Change
Coalition	Louise Stutes	21 (Note: Consists of 15 Democrats, 2 Republicans, and 4 Independents.)	20 (Note: Consists of 13 Democrats, 1 Republican, and 6 Independents.)	▼1
Republican	Cathy Tilton	17	19	▲2
Independent Republican	David Eastman	2	1	▼1
Total		40	40	

== Ballot measure ==
Alaska had one statewide ballot measure in 2022 - Ballot Measure 1 asked Alaskans whether a constitutional convention should be held, a vote that appears on ballots every ten years. The measure was supported by Governor Mike Dunleavy and opposed by the Alaskan Democratic Party.

Results by state house district No: 50–60%; 60–70%; 70–80%; 80–90%

Alaska Ballot Measure 1
Choice	Votes	%
For	75,723	29.55
Against	180,529	70.45
Total	256,252	100.00
