= Edgar Blatchford =

American politician, academic, and attorney

Mayor of Seward, Alaska
- In office 1999–2003
- Preceded by: Bob Satin
- Succeeded by: Stu Clark

Personal details
- Born: November 24, 1950 (age 75) Nome, Alaska, U.S.
- Party: Republican (before 2016); Democratic (2016–present)
- Education: Alaska Pacific University (BA); University of Washington (JD); Columbia University (MA); Harvard University (MPA); University of Alaska (PhD)

Edgar Omegitjoak Blatchford (born November 24, 1950) is an American academic, attorney, newspaper publisher and politician, who served as the mayor of Seward, Alaska and in the cabinet of two different Alaska governors.

Blatchford sought the 2016 Democratic Party nomination for United States Senate, losing the nomination in the Alaskan primary to Ray Metcalfe. Blatchford ran two more unsuccessful campaigns for U.S. Senate in 2020 and 2022. Blatchford also filed to run for lieutenant governor in the 2018 Democratic primary. He dropped out of the race on June 8.

Blatchford has been a professor at the University of Alaska Anchorage since 1995, teaching in the Department of Journalism and Public Communications. He served as commissioner of Community and Regional Affairs from 1990 to 1994 under Wally Hickel and commissioner of Community and Economic Development from 2003 to 2005 under Frank Murkowski; both departments have since been merged into the present day Department of Commerce, Community, and Economic Development.

== Early life and education ==
Edgar Omegitjoak Blatchford was born in Nome, Alaska Territory in 1950 and relocated to Seward, Alaska in 1960. Blatchford graduated from Seward High School and earned a Bachelor of Arts degree from Alaska Pacific University, Juris Doctor from the University of Washington School of Law, Masters of Arts degree in journalism from Columbia University, Master of Public Administration from Harvard University, and PhD from the University of Alaska Fairbanks.

== Career ==
Blatchford founded the publishing company Alaska Newspapers, Inc. in 1983. In 1990, Blatchford partnered with Calista Native Corporation to procure a total of six rural Alaskan newspapers. ANI was chartered to serve sparsely populated regions in Alaska to include parts of the Kenai Peninsula, Bristol Bay, Prince William Sound, the Aleutian Islands and the Yukon-Kuskokwim Delta. In 2011, Blatchford purchased The Tundra Drums and Seward Phoenix Log from Calista Corp.; subsequently, Calista liquidated its share in the remaining newspapers in August 2011.

Blatchford worked as a member of Wally Hickel's cabinet in developing the Community Development Quotas program aimed at providing educational and vocational opportunities to rural Alaskans in Bristol Bay and other western Alaskan communities.

In 1999, he unseated incumbent mayor Bob Satin to be elected mayor of Seward, Alaska. He was reelected mayor in 2001.

Blatchford was appointed commissioner of Community and Economic Development in January 2003 by governor Frank Murkowski. Murkowski cited Blatchford's prior experience as commissioner of Community and Regional Affairs under governor Hickel as a prime reason for Blatchford's selection. On July 22, 2005, Blatchford resigned his position as commissioner of Community and Economic Development due to conflict of interest allegations between his official state duties and ties with Chugach Alaska Corp.

== Political positions ==
Until the 2016 Alaskan Senate race, Blatchford had been affiliated with the Republican Party, switching parties due to ideological reasons. He strongly supports reform of the 1971 Alaska Native Claims Settlement Act (ANCSA), saying that it was an experiment that did not accomplish what it was charted to do.

=== Gun control ===
Blatchford is an advocate of background checks for gun ownership and states that his stance is in line with the intent of the Second Amendment.

=== Illegal immigration ===
Blatchford supports a path for citizenship or other legal status for those illegal immigrants without criminal records.

=== Alaskan economy ===
Blatchford believes smaller Alaskan communities would benefit from a more diverse economic base.

=== Climate change ===
Blatchford believes global warming is a scientific certainty that must be addressed. He wants Alaska to increase its prominence in studying climate change and the Arctic.

== Bibliography ==
- Blatchford, Edgar (Winter 1994). "Working together for community economic development in rural Alaska". Economic Development Review. 12 (1): 41–45. ProQuest 230093217.
- Blatchford, Edgar (1994). "Creating Jobs and Industry in Rural Alaska" (PDF). Alaska Economic Trends. 14 (1): 6–12.
