= 2020 United States Senate election in Alaska =

- November 3, 2020

Nominee	Dan Sullivan	Al Gross
Party	Republican	Independent (Note: Gross ran as an independent with the nomination of the Democratic Party, and was listed on the ballot as the Democratic nominee.)
Alliance		Democratic
Popular vote	191,112	146,068
Percentage	53.90%	41.19%
- Sullivan: 30–40% 40–50% 50–60% 60–70% 70–80% 80–90% Gross: 30–40% 40–50% 50–60% 60–70% 70–80% >80% Tie: 40–50% No votes
U.S. senator before election
Dan Sullivan
Republican
Elected U.S. Senator
Dan Sullivan
Republican

The 2020 United States Senate election in Alaska was held on November 3, 2020, to elect a member of the United States Senate to represent the State of Alaska, concurrently with the nationwide presidential election, as well as other elections to the United States Senate, elections to the United States House of Representatives, and various state and local elections. Incumbent Republican Senator Dan Sullivan won re-election to a second term in office, defeating Democratic nominee Al Gross, the son of Avrum Gross, who ran as an independent candidate. John Wayne Howe, the nominee of the Alaskan Independence Party, was also on the ballot and finished a distant third.

Both primaries took place on August 18, 2020. Some pundits considered this to be a potential "dark horse" flip for the Democrats, as Gross did unexpectedly well in polling despite Alaska usually being considered a Republican stronghold, even leading in some polls. However, this lead did not materialize. Sullivan won re-election by a margin of 12.7%, triple his average lead in the pre-election polling. Sullivan also became the first candidate since 2002 to win a Senate election in Alaska with more than 50% of the vote.

== Republican primary ==
=== Candidates ===
==== Nominee ====
- Dan Sullivan, incumbent U.S. senator

==== Withdrawn ====
- Adam Master Newman

==== Endorsements ====
Dan Sullivan

U.S. federal officials

- Donald Trump, 45th president of the United States

Individuals

- Mark Levin, conservative talk radio host

=== Primary results ===
Republican primary results
Party	Candidate	Votes	%
Republican	Dan Sullivan (incumbent)	65,257	100.00%
Total votes		65,257	100.00%

== Libertarian–Democratic–Independence primary ==
Candidates from the Alaska Democratic Party, the Alaska Libertarian Party, and the Alaskan Independence Party appear on the same ballot, with the highest-placed candidate from each party receiving that party's nomination. In October 2017, the Alaska Democratic Party sued for the right to allow non-Democrats to compete for and win the Democratic nomination, which was ultimately decided in their favor in April 2018.

=== Democratic candidates ===
==== Nominee ====
- Al Gross (independent), orthopedic surgeon, commercial fisherman, and son of former Alaska Attorney General Avrum Gross

==== Eliminated in primary ====
- Edgar Blatchford (Democratic), Democratic candidate in the 2016 election for the U.S. Senate, founder and former editor and publisher of Alaska Newspapers, Inc., former mayor of Seward (1999–2003) and former commissioner of the Alaska Department of Commerce, Community and Economic Development
- Chris Cumings (independent), Democratic candidate in the 2018 election for Alaska's at-large congressional district and ex-bank employee

==== Disqualified from the ballot ====
- Larry N. Barnes (independent) (Note: Payment of filing fee was not made prior to the deadline.)

==== Withdrawn ====
- David Darden (independent), nonpartisan candidate for Anchorage Assembly District 3 Seat E in the 2018 special election

=== Alaskan Independence candidates ===
==== Nominee ====
- John Howe (Alaskan Independence), machinist

=== Endorsements ===
Al Gross

Local officials

- Pete Buttigieg, 2020 Democratic presidential candidate and former mayor of South Bend, Indiana (2012–2020)

Individuals

- Andrew Yang, Presidential Ambassador for Global Entrepreneurship (2015–2017), 2020 Democratic presidential candidate

Organizations

- 314 Action
- Alaska Center
- Alaska Democratic Party
- DSCC
- End Citizens United
- Humanity Forward
- J Street PAC
- Jewish Democratic Council of America
- The Lincoln Project
- Orthopaedic PAC
- Planned Parenthood Action Fund

Unions

- Communications Workers of America

=== Primary results ===
Democratic–Libertarian–Independence primary results
Party	Candidate	Votes	%
Independent	Al Gross	50,047	79.87%
Democratic	Edgar Blatchford	5,463	8.72%
Independence	John Howe	4,165	6.65%
Independent	Christopher Cumings	2,989	4.77%
Total votes		62,664	100.00%

== Other candidates ==
=== Green Party ===
==== Nominee ====
- Jed Whittaker, Green nominee in the 1996 United States Senate election in Alaska and salvage company owner (write-in candidate)

=== Independent ===
==== Declared ====
- Sidney "Sid" Hill, Independent write-in candidate for the 2018 election in Alaska's at-large congressional district, Independent write-in candidate for the 2014 United States Senate election in Alaska and LaRouchite (write-in candidate)
- Karen Nanouk (write-in candidate)

==== Withdrawn ====
- David Matheny, wildfire technician

== General election ==
=== Issues ===
==== Pebble Mine ====
Before the election, the Trump administration considered granting a permit for the construction of Pebble Mine, a copper, gold, and molybdenum mine in Bristol Bay. Gross and Sullivan were both critical of the mine by August 2020, citing environmental concerns. In September 2020, recordings were released in which executives Tom Collier and Ron Thiessen stated that Alaska's senators, including Sullivan, would not take any concrete steps to oppose the mine despite their stated opposition. Gross used the recordings to attack Sullivan, claiming that Sullivan actually supported Pebble Mine. In response, Sullivan clarified his opposition to the mine. The mine was a major topic during the Senate debate on October 10. In the debate, Gross attacked Sullivan for being insufficiently opposed to the mine, while Sullivan defended his opposition.

=== Predictions ===
Source	Ranking	As of
The Cook Political Report	Lean R	October 29, 2020
FiveThirtyEight	Likely R	November 2, 2020
Economist	Lean R	November 2, 2020
Daily Kos	Lean R	October 30, 2020
DDHQ	Lean R	November 3, 2020
Inside Elections	Lean R	October 28, 2020
Sabato's Crystal Ball	Lean R	November 2, 2020
RCP	Lean R	October 23, 2020
Politico	Lean R	November 2, 2020

==== Additional general election endorsements ====
Dan Sullivan (R)

U.S. federal officials

- Lisa Murkowski, U.S. senator from Alaska (2002–present)
- Tara Sweeney, Assistant Secretary of the Interior for Indian Affairs

Organizations

- Bering Straits Native Corporation
- Calista Corporation
- United States Chamber of Commerce

Labor unions

- International Union of Operating Engineers

Newspapers

- Anchorage Daily News
Al Gross (I)

U.S. senators

- Kamala Harris, U.S. senator from California (2017–present), Democratic Party's nominee for vice president in the 2020 election
- Chuck Schumer, U.S. senator from New York (1999–present), Senate Majority Leader (2020-present), Senate Minority Leader (2017–2020), Member of the U.S. House of Representatives from New York's 9th congressional district (1993–1999), New York's 10th congressional district (1983–1993), New York's 16th congressional district (1981–1983)

State executives

- Tony Knowles, Governor of Alaska (1994–2002), Mayor of Anchorage (1981–1987)

Organizations

- Demand Universal Healthcare
- Democratic Majority for Israel
- Natural Resources Defense Council Action Fund

Unions

- National Education Association of Alaska

=== Polls ===
Graphical summary

View source data.

Polling

Poll source	Date(s) administered	Sample size (Note: Key: A – all adults RV – registered voters LV – likely voters V – unclear)	Margin of error	Dan Sullivan (R)	Al Gross (I)	John Howe (AI)	Other	Undecided
Gravis Marketing	October 26–28, 2020	770 (LV)	± 3.5%	48%	45%	–	–	7%
Public Policy Polling (D) (Note: Poll sponsored by Protect Our Care, a pro-Affordable Care Act organization.)	October 19–20, 2020	800 (V)	± 3.5%	44%	41%	5%	–	10%
Change Research (I) (Note: Poll conducted for Gross' campaign.)	October 16–19, 2020	1,076 (LV)	± 4%	47%	44%	3%	–	5%
Siena College/New York Times	October 9–14, 2020	423 (LV)	± 5.7%	45%	37%	10%	2% (Note: Would not vote with 1%; "Someone else" with 0%)	7% (Note: Includes "Refused")
Harstad Strategic Research, Inc. (I)	October 10–13, 2020	606 (LV)	± 4%	46%	47%	–	–	–
Harstad Strategic Research, Inc. (I)	October 2–6, 2020	600 (LV)	–	46%	46%	–	–	–
Patinkin Research Strategies	September 30 – October 4, 2020	600 (LV)	± 4%	46%	47%	–	2% (Note: "Someone else" with 2%)	5%
Alaska Survey Research	September 26 – October 4, 2020	696 (LV)	–	48%	44%	–	–	8%
Harstad Strategic Research, Inc. (I) (Note: Poll sponsored by The Independent Alaska PAC, which has supported Al Gross's campaign for the US Senate race in Alaska prior to this poll's sampling period.)	September 20–23, 2020	602 (LV)	± 4%	46%	45%	–	–	–
Public Policy Polling (D)	August 27–28, 2020	638 (V)	± 3.9%	43%	43%	–	–	14%
Public Policy Polling (Note: Polling's funding was crowdsourced by Election Twitter.)	July 7–8, 2020	1,081 (V)	± 3.0%	39%	34%	–	–	27%
Alaska Survey Research	June 23 – July 7, 2020	663 (LV)	± 3.8%	53%	40%	–	–	7%

Hypothetical polling

with Forrest Dunbar

Poll source	Date(s) administered	Sample size	Margin of error	Dan Sullivan (R)	Forrest Dunbar (D)	Undecided
Patinkin Research Strategies	May 28 – Jun 4, 2019	500 (LV)	–	39%	39%	22%

with Forrest Dunbar as an independent

Poll source	Date(s) administered	Sample size	Margin of error	Dan Sullivan (R)	Forrest Dunbar (I)	Undecided
Patinkin Research Strategies	May 28 – June 4, 2019	500 (LV)	–	42%	40%	19%

=== Results ===
2020 United States Senate election in Alaska
Party	Candidate	Votes	%	±%
Republican	Dan Sullivan (incumbent)	191,112	53.90%	+5.94%
Independent	Al Gross	146,068	41.19%	−4.64%
Independence	John Howe	16,806	4.74%	N/A
Write-in		601	0.17%	−0.32%
Total votes		354,587	100.0%	
Republican hold				

==== By state house district ====
District	Dan Sullivan Republican		Al Gross Independent		John Howe Independence		Write-in		Margin		Total votes	Representative
District	#	%	#	%	#	%	#	%	#	%	Total votes	Representative
District 1	3,487	48.36	3,293	45.67	414	5.74	16	0.22	194	2.69	7,210	Bart LeBon
District 2	3,379'	59.75	1,895	33.51	372	6.58	9	0.16	1,484	26.24	5,655	Steve M. Thompson
District 3	6,004	72.32	1,810	21.80	480	5.78	8	0.10	4,194	50.52	8,302	Mike Prax
District 4	4,817	45.69	5,301	50.28	407	3.86	17	0.16	-484	-4.59	10,542	Grier Hopkins
District 5	4,188	48.49	4,104	47.52	332	3.84	13	0.15	84	0.97	8,637	Adam Wool
District 6	5,601	60.87	3,068	33.34	518	5.63	15	0.16	2,533	16.66	9,202	Mike Cronk
District 7	6,752	70.90	2,185	22.94	563	5.91	23	0.24	4,567	47.96	9,523	Christopher Kurka
District 8	7,253	73.86	1,980	20.16	574	5.84	13	0.13	5,273	53.70	9,820	Kevin J. McCabe
District 9	7,582	69.53	2,786	25.55	519	4.76	17	0.16	4,796	43.98	10,904	George Rauscher
District 10	7,735	69.72	2,742	24.71	598	5.39	20	0.18	4,993	45.00	11,095	David Eastman
District 11	7,051	66.63	3,047	28.79	476	4.50	8	0.08	4,004	37.84	10,582	DeLena Johnson
District 12	7,877	70.73	2,824	25.36	425	3.82	11	0.10	5,053	45.37	11,137	Cathy Tilton
District 13	4,684	62.75	2,400	32.15	372	4.98	8	0.11	2,284	30.60	7,464	Ken McCarty
District 14	7,114	62.23	3,894	34.06	415	3.63	9	0.08	3,220	28.17	11,432	Kelly Merrick
District 15	2,613	48.61	2,449	45.56	308	5.73	5	0.09	164	3.05	5,375	David Nelson
District 16	3,545	43.87	4,110	50.87	410	5.07	15	0.19	-565	-6.99	8,080	Ivy Spohnholz
District 17	2,903	40.42	3,951	55.01	315	4.39	13	0.18	-1,048	-14.59	7,182	Andy Josephson
District 18	2,807	36.63	4,553	59.41	289	3.77	14	0.18	-1,746	-22.78	7,663	Harriet Drummond
District 19	1,876	35.73	3,046	58.01	310	5.90	19	0.36	-1,170	-22.28	5,251	Geran Tarr
District 20	2,526	33.95	4,657	62.59	243	3.27	14	0.19	-2,131	-28.64	7,440	Zack Fields
District 21	3,980	42.21	5,141	54.52	296	3.14	12	0.13	-1,161	-12.31	9,429	Matt Claman
District 22	4,977	52.16	4,202	44.04	336	3.52	26	0.27	775	7.91	9,541	Sara Rasmussen
District 23	3,734	48.38	3,638	47.14	335	4.34	11	0.14	96	1.24	7,718	Chris Tuck
District 24	5,835	55.87	4,363	41.78	238	2.28	7	0.07	1,472	14.10	10,443	Thomas McKay
District 25	4,556	49.07	4,367	47.03	350	3.77	12	0.13	189	2.04	9,285	Calvin Schrage
District 26	5,651	55.95	4,172	41.31	267	2.64	10	0.10	1,479	14.64	10,100	Laddie Shaw
District 27	4,534	47.76	4,608	48.54	342	3.60	9	0.09	-74	-0.78	9,493	Liz Snyder
District 28	6,753	52.83	5,776	45.18	244	1.91	10	0.08	977	7.64	12,783	James D. Kaufman
District 29	7,237	67.86	2,923	27.41	497	4.66	7	0.07	4,314	40.45	10,664	Ben Carpenter
District 30	7,034	70.06	2,502	24.92	485	4.83	19	0.19	4,532	45.14	10,040	Ron Gillham
District 31	6,763	54.84	5,049	40.94	498	4.04	23	0.19	1,714	13.90	12,333	Sarah Vance
District 32	4,309	52.49	3,449	42.01	438	5.34	13	0.16	860	10.48	8,209	Louise Stutes
District 33	3,074	28.20	7,463	68.47	341	3.13	21	0.19	-4,389	-40.27	10,899	Sara Hannan
District 34	4,667	43.57	5,608	52.35	427	3.99	10	0.09	-941	-8.78	10,712	Andi Story
District 35	4,388	43.84	5,004	49.99	598	5.97	20	0.20	-616	-6.15	10,010	Jonathan Kreiss-Tomkins
District 36	5,005	54.42	3,679	40.00	495	5.38	18	0.20	1,326	14.42	9,197	Dan Ortiz
District 37	2,393	47.17	2,303	45.40	366	7.21	11	0.22	90	1.77	5,073	Bryce Edgmon
District 38	1,698	32.07	2,972	56.13	610	11.52	15	0.28	-1,274	-24.06	5,295	Tiffany Zulkosky
District 39	2,403	41.03	2,701	46.12	699	11.93	54	0.92	-298	-5.09	5,857	Neal Foster
District 40	2,275	49.56	1,706	37.17	594	12.94	15	0.33	569	12.40	4,590	Josiah Patkotak
Totals	191,112	53.90	146,068	41.19	16,806	4.74	601	0.17	45,044	12.70	354,587	

Boroughs and census areas that flipped from Democratic to Republican

- Aleutians East Borough (largest city: Akutan)
- Aleutians West Census Area (largest city: Unalaska)
- Anchorage
- Denali Borough (largest city: Healy)
- Nome Census Area (largest city: Nome)
- North Slope Borough (largest city: Utqiaġvik)
- Northwest Arctic Borough (largest city: Kotzebue)
- Prince of Wales–Hyder Census Area (largest city: Craig)

== Notes ==
Partisan clients
