= 1992 United States House of Representatives election in Alaska =

- November 3, 1992
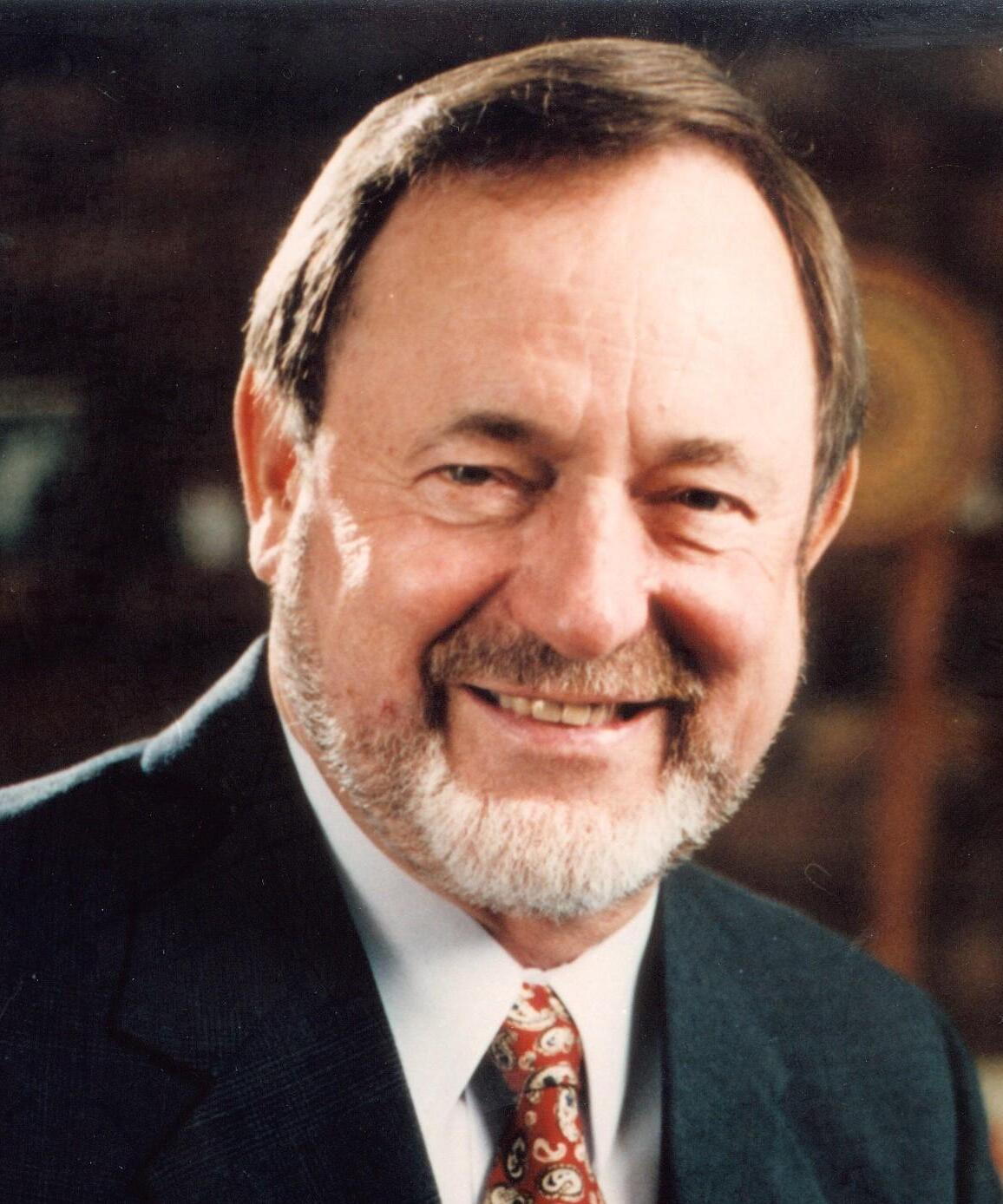

Nominee	Don Young	John Devens	Michael States
Party	Republican	Democratic	Independence
Popular vote	111,849	102,378	15,049
Percentage	46.8%	42.8%	6.29%
- Results by state house district Young: 40–50% 50–60% Devens: 40–50% 50–60%
Representative at-large before election
Don Young
Republican
Elected Representative at-large
Don Young
Republican

The Alaska congressional election of 1992 was held on Tuesday, November 3, 1992. The term of the state's sole Representative to the United States House of Representatives expired on January 3, 1993. The winning candidate would serve a two-year term from January 3, 1993, to January 3, 1995.

== General election ==
=== Results ===
1992 Alaska's at-large congressional district election
Party	Candidate	Votes	%
Republican	Don Young (inc.)	111,849	46.78
Democratic	John Devens	102,378	42.82
Independence	Michael States	15,049	6.29
Green	Mike Milligan	9,529	3.99
Write-in		311	0.12
Total votes		239,116	100.00
Republican hold			
