= Christopher Kurka =

American politician

Chris Kurka
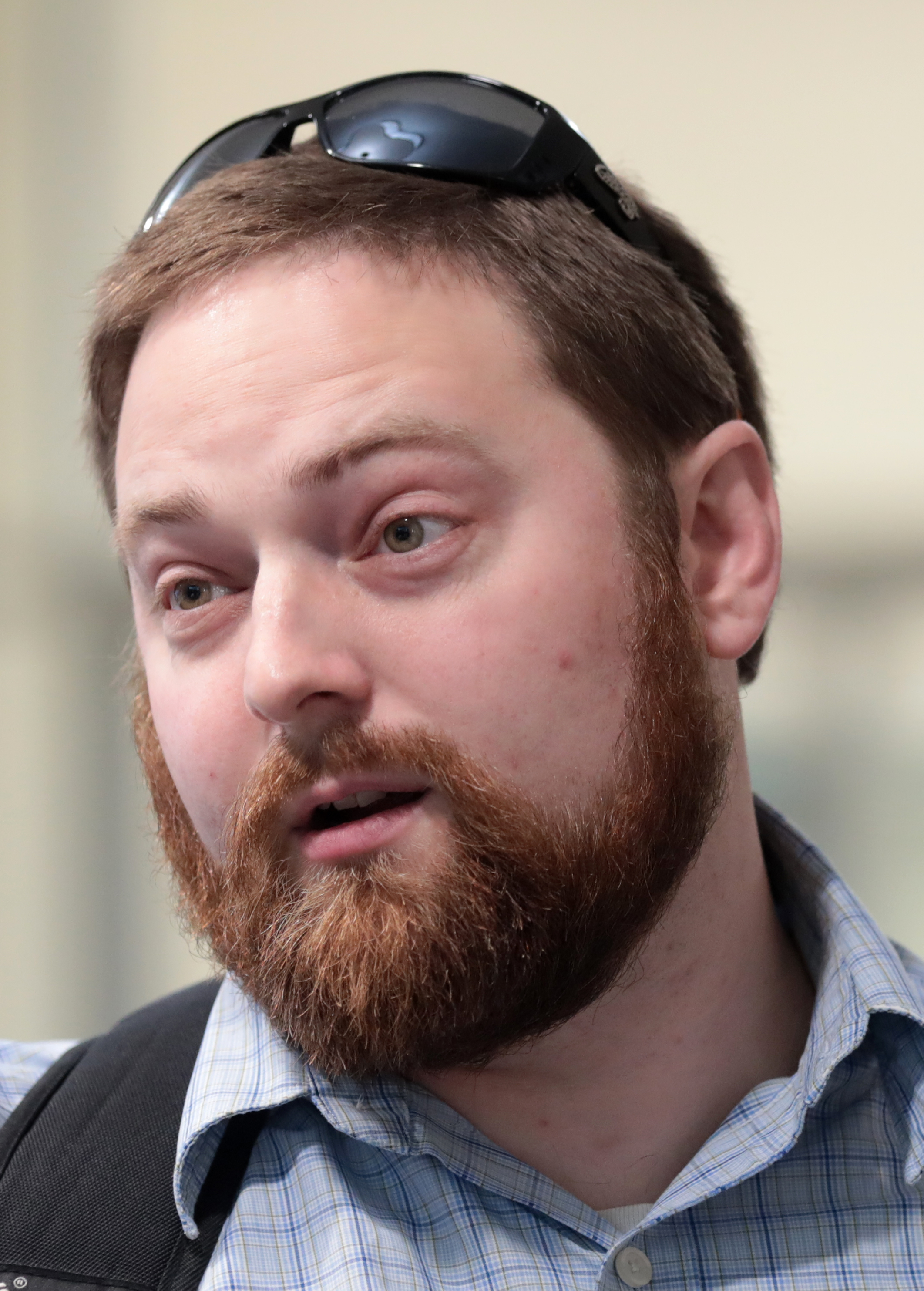
- Kurka at the 2022 Hazlitt Summit hosted by Young Americans for Liberty Foundation

Member of the Alaska House of Representatives from the 7th district
- In office January 19, 2021 – January 17, 2023
- Preceded by: Colleen Sullivan-Leonard
- Succeeded by: Justin Ruffridge

Personal details
- Born: Anchorage, Alaska, U.S.
- Party: Republican
- Spouse: Haylee
- Children: 4

Christopher Kurka is an American politician who served as a member of the Alaska House of Representatives from the 7th district. Elected in November 2018, he assumed office on January 19, 2021.

== Career ==
Kurka was the director of Alaska Right to Life before being elected to the legislature. In March 2022, he was one of only three members of the lower house who voted to continue to allow fourteen-year-olds to marry with court approval.

He proposed legislation to move the Alaska state capitol to Willow northwest of Wasilla, to allow the medications Ivermectin and Hydroxychloroquine to be sold without a prescription, and to prohibit employers from requiring employees to be vaccinated. He did not run for re-election in 2022 and was a Republican candidate for the 2022 Alaska gubernatorial election.
