= Alaska Democratic Party =

Alaska affiliate of the Democratic Party

- Chairperson: Eric Croft
- House Leader: N/A (Bipartisan Coalition)
- Senate Leader: N/A (Bipartisan Coalition)
- Headquarters: PO Box 240207, Anchorage, Alaska 99524
- Membership (2024): ▼73,963
- National affiliation: Democratic Party
- Colors: Turquoise
- Seats in the U.S. Senate: 0 / 2
- Seats in the U.S. House of Representatives: 0 / 1
- Statewide Executive Offices: 0 / 2
- Seats in the State Senate: 9 / 20 (Note: 9 Democrats are part of a grand coalition with 5 Republicans.)
- Seats in the State House of Representatives: 14 / 40 (Note: 14 Democrats are part of a grand coalition with 2 Republicans and 5 Independents.)

Election symbol

Website
- www.alaskademocrats.org

The Alaska Democratic Party is the affiliate of the Democratic Party in Alaska, headquartered in Anchorage.

It is one of two major parties in Alaska, alongside the Alaska Republican Party. The Democratic Party holds the Alaska Senate in a coalition government. As of 2024, there are over 70,000 registered members of the Alaska Democratic Party.

== History ==
In 1949, the Young Democrats of Alaska was established as a group. Except in U.S. presidential elections, the Alaska Democratic Party was very successful in the early days of statehood and the late territory days (pre-1959), featuring such characters as territorial governor and later national senator Ernest Gruening. Gruening was one of only two senators to vote against the Gulf of Tonkin Resolution, which authorized an expansion of U.S. involvement in the Vietnam War. Bob Bartlett, also a Democrat, and erstwhile secretary of the territory, was the first senator from Alaska, and remained a senator until his death in 1968. William A. Egan, also of the Alaska Democratic Party, was elected the first governor of the State of Alaska. Until the election of governor Bill Walker, he was the only governor of Alaska of either party to have been born in Alaska. In the U.S. House meanwhile, Democrat Ralph J. Rivers was the state's first representative from statehood until 1967.

In the aftermath of the assassination of Martin Luther King, Ted Kennedy, representing Senator Robert Kennedy (of New York), in the presence of Senator Gruening, gave a historic speech on the island-community of Sitka, Alaska. Democrat Mike Gravel was elected to the U.S. Senate in 1968 and served for two terms until his defeat in the Democratic primary in 1980 (Republicans ultimately picked up the seat in the general). By the end of 1973, Gravel was the only Alaska Democrat remaining in federal office, as the state's House seat and other Senate seat had switched hands to Republicans. After Gravel left office, Democrats would not hold any seats in Alaska's congressional delegation again for almost three decades.

=== Notable U.S. House elections ===
On October 16, 1972, Alaska's incumbent Democratic congressman Nick Begich went missing in a plane crash along with House Majority Leader Hale Boggs en route to Juneau from Anchorage. In spite of this, three weeks later, Begich won re-election to his seat. However, he was later declared dead on December 29 of that year after an intensive search effort. Neither Begich's body nor the plane he flew on were ever found.

In a special election held shortly thereafter in 1973, Republican Don Young (who had previously lost to the late Begich) won election to the seat and held it until his death while in office in 2022. In the special election held after Young's death, Democrat Mary Peltola won Alaska's at-large congressional seat, flipping the seat to Democrats for the first time in almost 50 years. Peltola would be elected a full term in November of that year.

=== Other recent history ===
The most recent Democrat to serve as Governor of Alaska was Tony Knowles, who served from 1994 to 2002, while the most recent Democrat to hold statewide executive office in Alaska was Byron Mallott, who served as Lieutenant Governor under independent governor Bill Walker from 2014 until his resignation in 2018 after a scandal.

Democrat Barack Obama won the 2008 Democratic caucuses in Alaska by a margin of more than three to one over Hillary Clinton, a higher percentage than any state except Idaho. He then received 37.89 percent of the total statewide vote in the general election, losing the state to Republican John McCain, who had selected then-Alaska Governor Sarah Palin as his vice-presidential running mate. In the same election year, Democrat Mark Begich narrowly won election to the U.S. Senate over longtime Republican incumbent Ted Stevens. Begich lost re-election in 2014, the same year that Democratic-endorsed independent Bill Walker defeated incumbent Republican Sean Parnell for Governor.

In 2012, President Obama lost the state to Republican Mitt Romney but increased his percentage of the statewide vote to 40.81%. This was later used as evidence in a high-profile New York Times article detailing the complexity of Alaska politics and the difficulty in predicting the electability of Democrats in the state. In 2016, Republican presidential candidate Donald Trump carried the state by around fifteen percentage points over Hillary Clinton. No Democrat has carried Alaska in presidential elections since 1964 when Lyndon B. Johnson had his landslide victory over Barry Goldwater.

Following the 2022 Alaska Senate elections, nine Democrats joined with eight Republicans to form a majority caucus and split several senate posts between them.

== Party organization ==
=== Party leadership ===
The leadership of the Alaska Democratic Party consists of the following individuals:

- Chair - Eric Croft
- Vice Chair - Jessica Cook
- Secretary - Katherine Pfeiffer
- Treasurer - Monica Southworth
- National Committeewoman - Brenda Knapp
- National Committeeman - Charles Degnan

=== Party functions ===
The Alaska Democratic Party performs many functions, all with the aim of helping Democrats to win elected office within the state.

These functions include:

- The organization and recruitment of citizens to go door to door for the party and promote the party issues and candidates.
- The coordination of statewide campaigns for the general election every two years.
- Working to get articles into newspapers, letters to the editors written, and callers on talk radio stations.
- Operating the official Alaska Democratic Party website.
- Sending out email announcements to Democrats regarding party activities.
- Operating a state Voter File.

== Current elected officials ==
=== Members of Congress ===
==== U.S. Senate ====
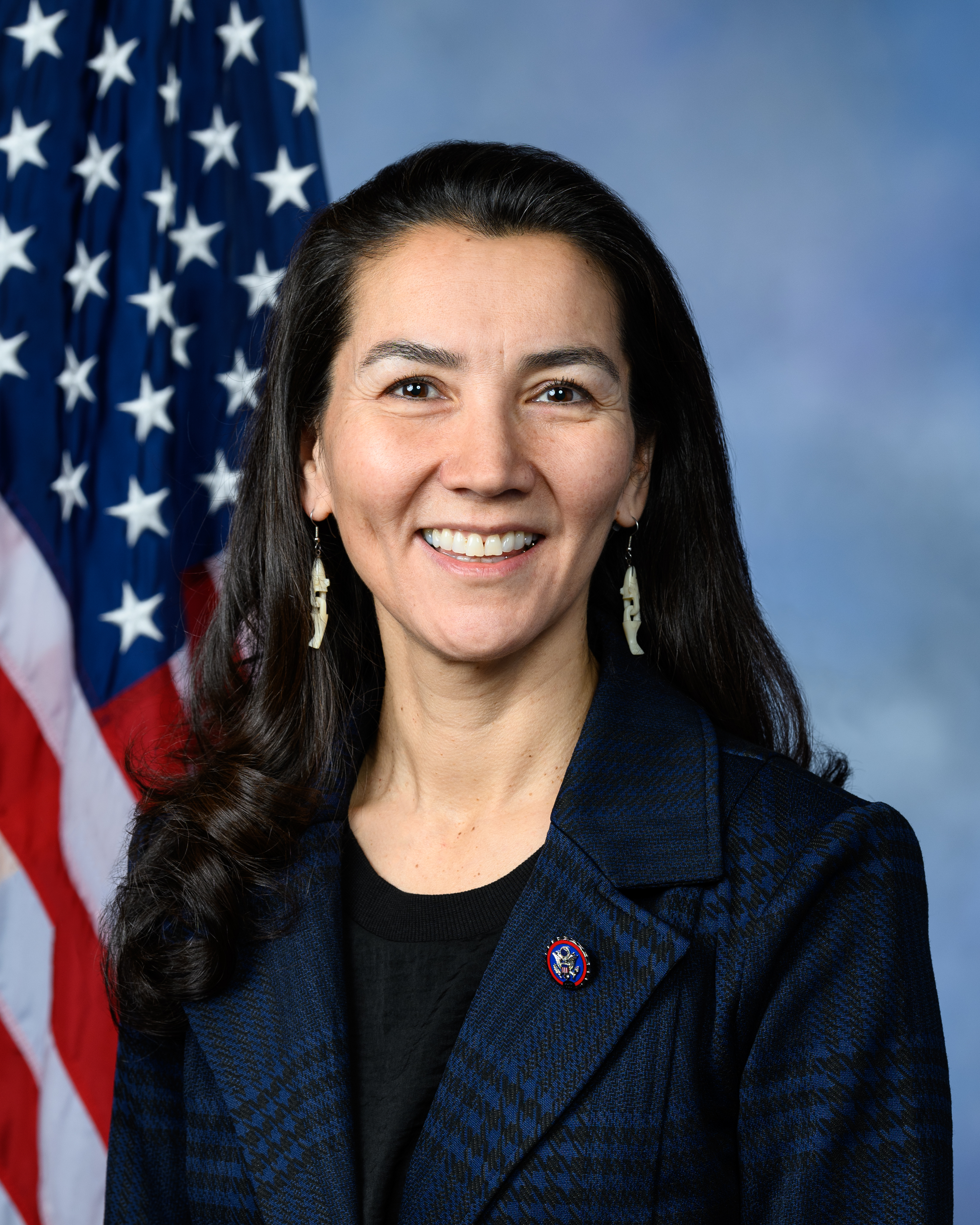
Pre-junior U.S. Senator-elect Mary Peltola

==== U.S. House of Representatives ====
- None

=== State ===
==== Executive ====
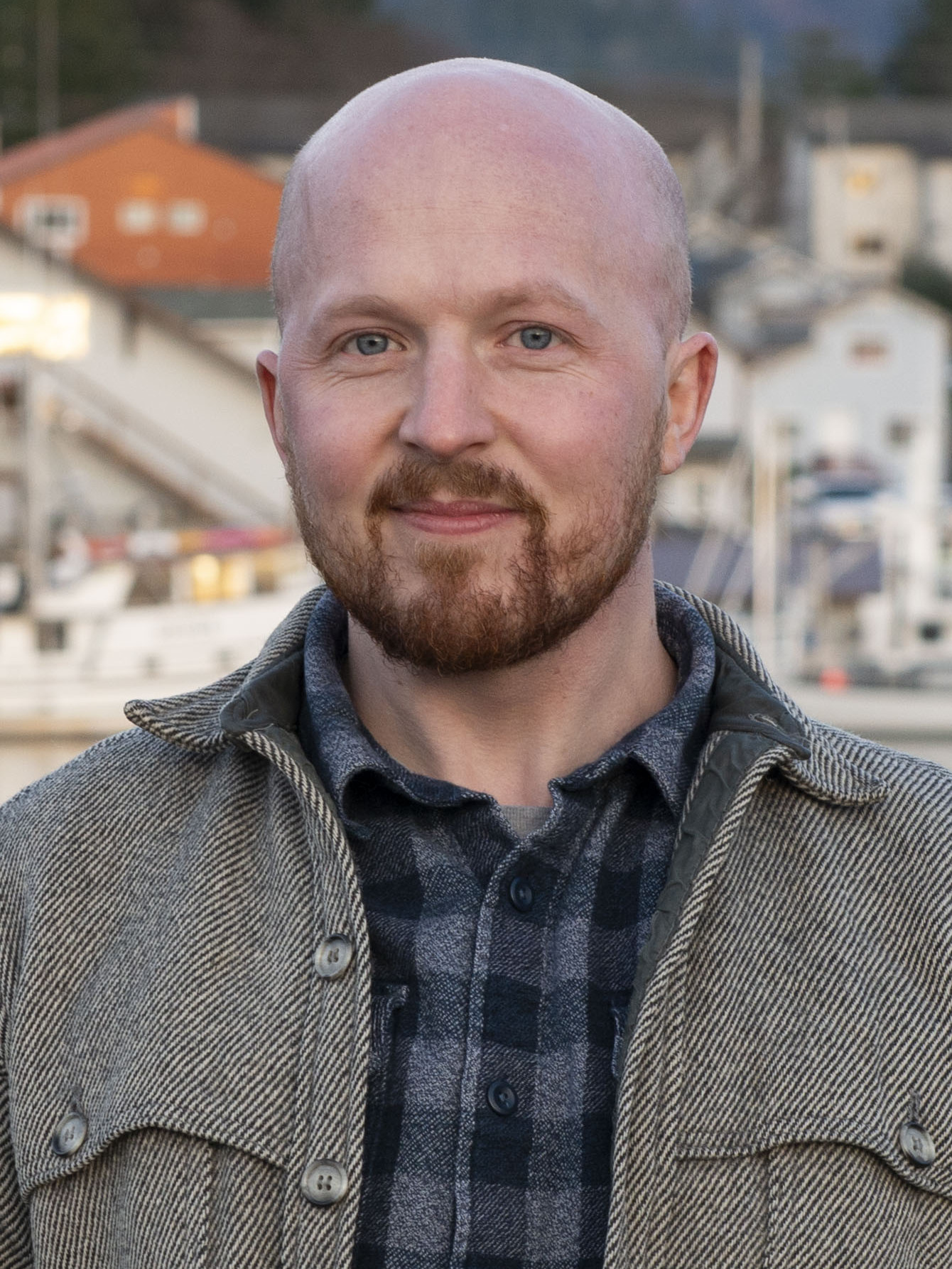
Governor-elect Jonathan Kreiss-Tomkins

== Election results ==
=== Federal ===
==== Presidential ====
Alaska Democratic Party presidential election results
| Election | Presidential Ticket | Votes | Vote % | Electoral votes | Result |
|---|---|---|---|---|---|
| 1960 | John F. Kennedy/Lyndon B. Johnson | 29,809 | 49.06% | 0 / 3 | Won |
| 1964 | Lyndon B. Johnson/Hubert Humphrey | 44,329 | 65.91% | 3 / 3 | Won |
| 1968 | Hubert Humphrey/Edmund Muskie | 35,411 | 42.65% | 0 / 3 | Lost |
| 1972 | George McGovern/Sargent Shriver | 32,967 | 34.61% | 0 / 3 | Lost |
| 1976 | Jimmy Carter/Walter Mondale | 44,058 | 35.65% | 0 / 3 | Won |
| 1980 | Jimmy Carter/Walter Mondale | 41,842 | 26.41% | 0 / 3 | Lost |
| 1984 | Walter Mondale/Geraldine Ferraro | 62,007 | 29.87% | 0 / 3 | Lost |
| 1988 | Michael Dukakis/Lloyd Bentsen | 72,584 | 36.27% | 0 / 3 | Lost |
| 1992 | Bill Clinton/Al Gore | 78,294 | 30.29% | 0 / 3 | Won |
| 1996 | Bill Clinton/Al Gore | 80,380 | 33.27% | 0 / 3 | Won |
| 2000 | Al Gore/Joe Lieberman | 79,004 | 27.67% | 0 / 3 | Lost |
| 2004 | John Kerry/John Edwards | 111,025 | 35.52% | 0 / 3 | Lost |
| 2008 | Barack Obama/Joe Biden | 123,594 | 37.89% | 0 / 3 | Won |
| 2012 | Barack Obama/Joe Biden | 122,640 | 40.81% | 0 / 3 | Won |
| 2016 | Hillary Clinton/Tim Kaine | 116,454 | 36.55% | 0 / 3 | Lost |
| 2020 | Joe Biden/Kamala Harris | 153,778 | 42.77% | 0 / 3 | Won |
| 2024 | Kamala Harris/Tim Walz | 140,026 | 41.41% | 0 / 3 | Lost |

==== U.S. Senate ====
Class 2
| Year | Candidate | Votes | % | Result |
|---|---|---|---|---|
| 1984 | John E. Havelock | 58,804 | 28.49% | Lost ✗ |
| 1990 | Michael Beasley | 61,152 | 32.19% | Lost ✗ |
| 1996 | Theresa Obermeyer | 23,977 | 10.34% | Lost ✗ |
| 2002 | Frank Vondersaar | 24,133 | 10.51% | Lost ✗ |
| 2008 | Mark Begich | 151,767 | 47.77% | Won ✓ |
| 2014 | Mark Begich | 129,431 | 45.83% | Lost ✗ |
| 2020 | Endorsed Al Gross (Independent) | | | Lost ✗ |
| 2026 | Mary Peltola | 144,486 | 50.1% | Won ✓ |

Class 3
| Year | Candidate | Votes | % | Result |
|---|---|---|---|---|
| 1986 | Glenn Olds | 79,727 | 44.10% | Lost ✗ |
| 1992 | Tony Smith | 92,065 | 38.41% | Lost ✗ |
| 1998 | Joseph Sonneman | 43,743 | 19.72% | Lost ✗ |
| 2004 | Tony Knowles | 140,424 | 45.55% | Lost ✗ |
| 2010 | Scott McAdams | 60,045 | 23.46% | Lost ✗ |
| 2016 | Ray Metcalfe | 36,200 | 56.60% | Lost ✗ |
| 2022 | Pat Chesbro | 27,145 | 10.37% | Lost ✗ |

=== State ===
Governor
| Election | Gubernatorial ticket | Votes | % | Result |
|---|---|---|---|---|
| 1958 | William A. Egan/Hugh Wade | 29,189 | 59.61% | Won ✓ |
| 1962 | William A. Egan/Hugh Wade | 29,627 | 52.27% | Won ✓ |
| 1966 | William A. Egan/Hugh Wade | 32,065 | 48.37% | Lost ✗ |
| 1970 | William A. Egan/Red Boucher | 42,309 | 52.38% | Won ✓ |
| 1974 | William A. Egan/Red Boucher | 45,553 | 47.37% | Lost ✗ |
| 1978 | Chancy Croft/Katie Hurley | 25,656 | 20.22% | Lost ✗ |
| 1982 | Bill Sheffield/Steve McAlpine | 89,918 | 46.12% | Won ✓ |
| 1986 | Steve Cowper/Steve McAlpine | 84,943 | 47.31% | Won ✓ |
| 1990 | Tony Knowles/Willie Hensley | 60,201 | 30.91% | Lost ✗ |
| 1994 | Tony Knowles/Fran Ulmer | 87,693 | 41.08% | Won ✓ |
| 1998 | Tony Knowles/Fran Ulmer | 112,879 | 51.27% | Won ✓ |
| 2002 | Fran Ulmer/Ernie Hall | 94,216 | 40.70% | Lost ✗ |
| 2006 | Tony Knowles/Ethan Berkowitz | 97,238 | 40.97% | Lost ✗ |
| 2010 | Ethan Berkowitz/Diane E. Benson | 96,519 | 37.67% | Lost ✗ |
| 2014 | Endorsed Bill Walker/Byron Mallott (Independents) | N/A | N/A | Did not run |
| 2018 | Mark Begich/Debra Call | 125,739 | 44.41% | Lost ✗ |
| 2022 | Les Gara/Jessica Cook | 63,851 | 24.21% | Lost ✗ |
| 2026 | Jonathan Kreiss-Tomkins/Zac Johnson | 141,623 | 50.9% | Won ✓ |

== See also ==
- Political party strength in Alaska
- List of state parties of the Democratic Party (United States)
- 2020 Alaska Democratic primary
