= Al Gross (politician) =

American physician and politician from Alaska

Personal details
- Born: Alan Stuart Gross; April 13, 1962 (age 64) Juneau, Alaska, U.S.
- Party: Independent
- Other political affiliations: Democratic (2022)
- Spouse: Monica Gross
- Children: 4
- Parent: Avrum Gross (father)
- Relatives: Benedict Gross (uncle)
- Education: Amherst College (BA); University of Washington (MD); University of California, Los Angeles (MPH)
- Website: Campaign website

Alan Stuart Gross (born April 13, 1962) is an American politician, orthopedic surgeon and commercial fisherman. Running as an independent candidate, he was the Democratic nominee for the 2020 United States Senate election in Alaska, losing the race to incumbent Republican Dan Sullivan.

== Early life and education ==
Gross was born in Juneau in 1962. He is the son of former Alaska Attorney General Avrum and Shari Gross, the first Executive Director of the United Fishermen of Alaska. She also founded the Alaska chapter of the League of Women Voters. Benedict Gross was his paternal uncle.

As a child, Gross was part of the small Jewish community in Alaska. His parents gave him the first bar mitzvah in Southeast Alaska.

While attending Douglas High School in Juneau, Gross developed an interest in fishing, both sport and commercial. When he was 14, he bought his first commercial fishing boat with a bank loan. He commercially gillnet fished for salmon in the summers to pay his way through college and medical school.

Gross graduated from Amherst College in 1985 with a degree in neuroscience. He studied medicine at the WWAMI Regional Medical Education Program, graduating in 1989.

== Medical career ==
After graduating from medical school, Gross served as the president of the Bartlett Regional Hospital medical staff. In 2006, he founded and served as the president of the Juneau Bone and Joint Center. Gross retired from full-time orthopedic surgery in 2013, but worked occasionally for the Petersburg Medical Center.

Gross practiced as an orthopedic surgeon in Juneau, beginning in 1994. In 2013, Gross left his practice, along with his wife Monica Gross, to study health care economics, earning a master's of public health at University of California, Los Angeles. He has said that he grew uncomfortable with the high costs of healthcare, and pursued his MPH degree to study solutions.

== Political career ==
After earning his MPH, Gross returned to Alaska and began his advocacy for healthcare reform. In 2017, he co-sponsored two ballot initiatives in Alaska. The Quality Health Insurance for Alaskans Act sought to add certain provisions from the Affordable Care Act into state law, including protection against discrimination based on preexisting conditions, mandatory coverage for prenatal and maternal care, and provisions that children could remain covered by their parents' insurance until age 26. The Healthcare for Alaskans Act would codify the Medicaid expansion, already in effect due to an executive order by Governor Bill Walker. Both initiatives were withdrawn from the ballot in December 2017. Supporters cited uncertainty in healthcare policy at the federal level as the reason for the withdrawal.

=== 2020 U.S. Senate campaign ===
On July 2, 2019, Gross announced he would run as an independent in the 2020 U.S. Senate election in Alaska. He won the August Democratic primary against Democrat Edgar Blatchford and independent Chris Cumings, gaining the nomination of the Alaska Democratic Party, which had endorsed him before the filing deadline.

Gross ran as an independent against Republican incumbent Senator Dan Sullivan. He had the support of the Democratic Senatorial Campaign Committee and The Lincoln Project.

Gross said, "I stepped up to do this because the Alaska economy has been failing, we’ve been losing Alaskans to the Lower 48 for the past few years, and despite that labor loss, we had the highest unemployment in the country."

The Daily Beast argued that Alaska "flirts with purple-state status" in part due to Gross's candidacy. There was speculation that the political fallout of the death of Ruth Bader Ginsburg and the Amy Coney Barrett Supreme Court nomination could dampen support for incumbent Sullivan and benefit Gross's campaign.

More than a week after the election, Sullivan's reelection in what was expected to be a close race was affirmed.

In October 2021, Gross ran for Hospital Board in a hotly contested election in Petersburg, Alaska and finished fourth.

=== 2022 U.S. House campaign ===
On March 28, 2022, Gross announced he would run as an independent candidate for Alaska's at-large congressional seat that was vacated upon the death of Congressman Don Young. Although he won third place in the blanket primary and the opportunity to compete in the general election, which would be decided on ranked voting, he withdrew on June 20, 2022. He endorsed Mary Peltola, a Democrat, who won the special election in an upset.

== Political positions ==
Despite receiving the Alaska Democratic Party's endorsement, Gross is an independent politician and says he is closer to Republicans on such "issues like guns and immigration".

Gross fully supports instant-runoff voting. However, in 2026, he reversed this position in an opinion piece endorsing his former opponent Dan Sullivan for Senate and wrote that ranked-choice voting should be repealed. He is neutral on Universal Basic Income (UBI), which resembles the Alaska Permanent Fund (APF), saying, "The UBI check here in Alaska has been a great program, but any program like that, you have to be careful you don't disincentivize going back to the workforce."

=== Environmental and energy policy ===
He supports renewable energy. Like Sullivan, he supports oil drilling in the Arctic National Wildlife Refuge.

Gross opposes the Green New Deal.

=== Foreign policy ===
He has said that he would be a "staunch defender" of Israel.

=== Gun policy ===
Gross has said that he is a "strong proponent of the Second Amendment" and "will vote against banning any guns." He has stated support for background checks on military assault weapons.

=== Health care ===
In 2017, he wrote in support of single-payer, but he did not include single-payer as part of his senatorial campaign and his radio, social media and television ads initially opposed the idea. In 2020, he said he supports federal legalization of cannabis to help small businesses and others.

=== Social policy ===
Gross was endorsed by Planned Parenthood and the Human Rights Campaign.

== Electoral history ==
=== 2020 ===
2020 Democratic–Libertarian–Independence primary results
Party	Candidate	Votes	%
Independent	Al Gross	50,047	79.87%
Democratic	Edgar Blatchford	5,463	8.72%
Independence	John Howe	4,165	6.65%
Independent	Christopher Cumings	2,989	4.77%
Total votes		62,664	100.0%

2020 United States Senate election in Alaska
Party	Candidate	Votes	%	±%
Republican	Dan Sullivan (incumbent)	191,112	53.90%	+5.94%
Independent	Al Gross	146,068	41.19%	−4.64%
Independence	John Howe	16,806	4.74%	N/A
Write-in		601	0.17%	-0.32%
Total votes		354,587	100.0%	
Republican hold				

Party political offices
Preceded by Mark Begich	Democratic nominee for U.S. Senator from Alaska (Class 2); Endorsed; 2020	Succeeded by Mary Peltola
