= Avrum Gross =

American lawyer and Attorney General of Alaska

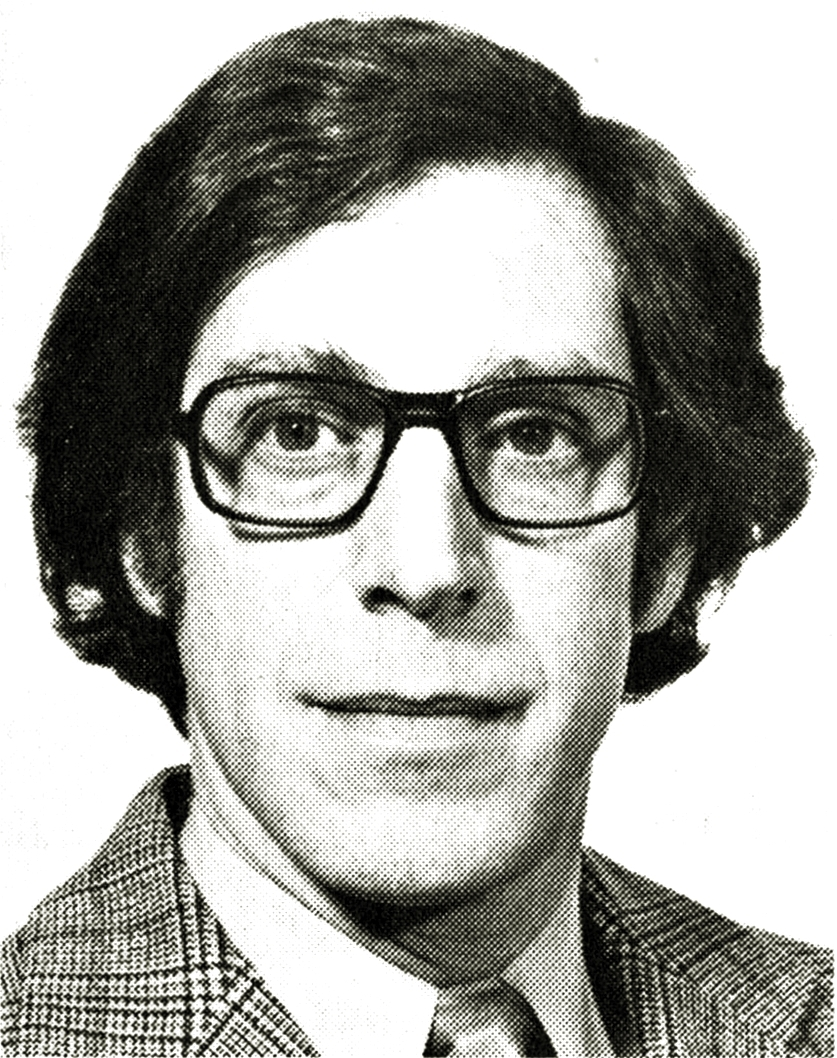

Attorney General of Alaska
- In office 1974–1980
- Governor: Jay Hammond
- Preceded by: Norman Gorsuch
- Succeeded by: Wilson Condon

Personal details
- Born: February 25, 1936 New York City, New York, U.S.
- Died: May 8, 2018 (aged 82) Southeast Alaska, U.S.
- Party: Democratic
- Children: Al Gross
- Relatives: Benedict Gross (brother)
- Education: Amherst College (BA); University of Michigan (JD)

Avrum M. Gross (February 25, 1936 – May 8, 2018) was an American lawyer who served as the Attorney General of Alaska from 1974 through 1980.

== Early life and education ==
Gross was born on February 25, 1936, in New York City. He was raised in South Orange, New Jersey, and was a pre-college student at the Juilliard School for violin. He graduated from Amherst College in 1957 and earned his J.D. degree from the University of Michigan, before moving to Alaska in 1961.

== Career ==
Gross worked for the Alaska Legislature, where he met Jay Hammond. He worked as special counsel on fisheries for the Alaska Department of Law before going into private practice. Hammond, who was elected Governor of Alaska in 1974, appointed Gross as his attorney general, though Hammond was a Republican and Gross was a Democrat.

Hammond explained his decision to appoint Gross by saying "Well, I think it is the obligation to appoint the best legal talent available to fill position of attorney general. And to me Av Gross is right up there at the top, even his cohorts and colleagues agree.’"

As attorney general, Gross helped establish the Alaska Permanent Fund and ended the practice of plea bargaining. He served as attorney general until 1980, before returning to private practice.

== Personal life ==
His younger brother was Benedict Gross. His son, Al Gross, was a candidate for the United States Senate in the 2020 election. Gross died on May 8, 2018, from pancreatic cancer.

Legal offices
Preceded by Norman Gorsuch	Attorney General of Alaska; 1974–1980	Succeeded by Wilson Condon
