= Alaska Department of Commerce, Community, and Economic Development =

Government agency in Alaska, United States

Agency overview
- Headquarters: Juneau, Alaska
- Agency executive: Julie Sande, Commissioner
- Website: www.commerce.alaska.gov

The Alaska Department of Commerce, Community, and Economic Development (DCCED) is a department within the government of Alaska. The department contains the Alcohol & Marijuana Control Office (AMCO). It conducts board certification of physicians and nurses, and issues licenses for many other professions. It is also involved in healthcare reimbursements.
