= 2024 United States local elections =

- 2024
- Mayoral elections

34 mayors in the top 100 most populous cities
	Majority party	Minority party	Third party
Party	Democratic	Republican	Libertarian
Mayors before	63	26	1
Mayors after	65	25	1
Seat change	▲2	▼1	Steady
	Fourth party
Party	Independent/NP
Mayors before	10
Mayors after	9
Seat change	▼1
- Maps of 2024 mayoral elections in the top 100 most populous cities.

The 2024 United States local elections were held throughout the year to elect officers of municipal and county governments.

== Municipal election summary ==
Consolidated city-counties will also be listed here.

=== Mayoral elections ===
City	Date	Incumbent			Notes	Results (final round)
City	Date	Party	Mayor	Elected	Notes	Results (final round)
Anchorage, AK	Apr 2, 2024 (general); May 14, 2024 (runoff)	Rep (Note: Election is officially nonpartisan.)	Dave Bronson	2021	Incumbent lost re-election. Independent gain.	▌ ✓ Suzanne LaFrance (Ind) 53.5%; ▌Dave Bronson (Rep) 46.5%
Austin, TX	Nov 5, 2024	Dem	Kirk Watson	1996; 2022	Incumbent re-elected.	▌ ✓ Kirk Watson (Dem) 50.0%; ▌Carmen Llanes Pulido (Dem) 20.4%; ▌Kathie Tovo (Dem) 16.7%; ▌Jeffrey Bowen (NP) 8.1%; ▌Carmen Llanes Pulido (Dem) 4.7%
Bakersfield, CA	Mar 5, 2024	Rep	Karen Goh	2016; 2020	Incumbent re-elected.	▌ ✓ Karen Goh (Rep) 83.2%; ▌Gregory Tatum (NP) 16.8%
Baltimore, MD	May 14, 2024 (primary); Nov 5, 2024 (general)	Dem	Brandon Scott	2020	Incumbent re-elected.	▌ ✓ Brandon Scott (Dem) 82.2%; ▌Shannon Wright (Rep) 17.8%
Baton Rouge, LA	Nov 5, 2024 (primary); Dec 7, 2024 (general)	Dem	Sharon Weston Broome	2016; 2020	Incumbent lost re-election. Republican gain.	▌ ✓ Sid Edwards (Rep) 54.1%; ▌Sharon Weston Broome (Dem) 45.9%
Chesapeake, VA	Nov 5, 2024	Rep	Rick West	2017 (suc.); 2018 (sp.); 2020	Incumbent re-elected.	▌ ✓ Rick West (Rep) 56.1%; ▌Don Carey III (NP) 43.9%
Corpus Christi, TX	Nov 5, 2024 (general); Dec 14, 2024 (runoff)	NP	Paulette Guajardo	2020; 2022	Incumbent re-elected.	▌ ✓ Paulette Guajardo (NP) 50.6%; ▌Michael Hunter (NP) 49.4%
El Paso, TX	Nov 5, 2024 (general); Dec 14, 2024 (runoff)	Dem	Oscar Leeser	2013; 2020	Incumbent retired. Democratic hold.	▌ ✓ Renard Johnson (Dem) 56.1%; ▌Brian Kennedy (NP) 43.9%
Fremont, CA	Nov 5, 2024	Dem	Lily Mei	2016; 2020	Incumbent retired. Democratic hold.	▌ ✓ Raj Salwan (Dem) 47.1%; ▌Vinnie Bacon (Dem) 32.4%; ▌Rohan Marfatia (NP) 11.6%; ▌Hiu Ng (NP) 8.9%
Fresno, CA	Mar 5, 2024 (primary); Nov 5, 2024 (general, canceled)	Rep	Jerry Dyer	2020	Incumbent re-elected.	▌ ✓ Jerry Dyer (Rep) 80.0%; ▌James Barr (Dem) 14.2%; ▌Samantha Dussell (NP) 5.8%
Gilbert, AZ	Jul 30, 2024 (primary); Nov 5, 2024 (general, canceled)	Rep	Brigette Peterson	2020	Incumbent retired. Republican hold.	▌ ✓ Scott Gilbert (Rep) 56.6%; ▌Natalie DiBernardo (Rep) 43.1%; ▌Write-ins 0.3%
Glendale, AZ	Jul 30, 2024 (primary); Nov 5, 2024 (general, canceled)	Rep	Jerry Weiers	2020; 2016; 2012	Incumbent re-elected.	▌ ✓ Jerry Weiers (Rep) 97.2%; ▌Write-ins 2.8%
Honolulu, HI	Aug 10, 2024 (primary); Nov 5, 2024 (general, canceled)	Ind	Rick Blangiardi	2020	Incumbent re-elected.	▌ ✓ Rick Blangiardi (Ind) 78.0%; ▌Choon James (NP) 14.4%; ▌David Bourgoin (Dem) 3.9%; ▌Karl Dicks (Rep) 3.7%
Irvine, CA	Nov 5, 2024	Dem	Farrah Khan	2020; 2022	Incumbent retired. Democratic hold.	▌ ✓ Larry Agran (Dem) 38.8%; ▌Tammy Kim (Dem) 34.5%; ▌Ron Scolesdang (Rep) 11.7%; ▌Lee Sun (Dem) 5.5%; ▌Felipe Delgado (Rep) 4.8%; ▌Akshat Bhatia (NP) 2.5%; ▌Wing Chow (Rep) 2.3%
Las Vegas, NV	Jun 11, 2024 (primary); Nov 5, 2024 (general)	Ind	Carolyn Goodman	2011; 2015; 2019	Incumbent term-limited. Democratic gain.	▌ ✓ Shelley Berkley (Dem) 53.2%; ▌Victoria Seaman (Rep) 46.8%
Lubbock, TX	May 4, 2024 (general); Jun 15, 2024 (runoff)	Rep	Tray Payne	2022	Incumbent retired. Republican hold.	▌ ✓ Mark McBrayer (Rep) 72.2%; ▌Steve Massengale (Rep) 27.8%
Mesa, AZ	Jul 30, 2024 (primary); Nov 5, 2024 (general)	Rep	John Giles	2020; 2016	Incumbent retired. Republican hold.	▌ ✓ Mark Freeman (Rep) 52.9%; ▌Scott Smith (Rep) 47.1%
Milwaukee, WI	Feb 20, 2024 (primary); Apr 2, 2024 (general)	Dem	Cavalier Johnson	2021 (succ.); 2022 (sp.)	Incumbent re-elected.	▌ ✓ Cavalier Johnson (Dem) 81.0%; ▌David King (Rep) 18.4%; ▌Write-ins 0.7%
Norfolk, VA	Nov 5, 2024	Dem	Kenny Alexander	2020; 2016	Incumbent re-elected.	▌ ✓ Kenny Alexander (Dem) 59.9%; ▌Thomas Leeman Jr. (NP) 33.7%; ▌Giovanni Dolmo (Rep) 6.4%
Phoenix, AZ	Nov 5, 2024	Dem	Kate Gallego	2018; 2020	Incumbent re-elected.	▌ ✓ Kate Gallego (Dem) 62.0%; ▌Matt Evans (NP) 37.8%
Portland, OR	Nov 5, 2024	Dem	Ted Wheeler	2018; 2020	Incumbent retired. Democratic hold.	▌ ✓ Keith Wilson (Dem) 59.3%; ▌Carmen Rubio (Dem) 40.8%
Raleigh, NC	Nov 5, 2024	Dem	Mary-Ann Baldwin	2019; 2022	Incumbent retired. Democratic hold.	▌ ✓ Janet Cowell (Dem) 59.8%; ▌Paul Fitts (Rep) 18.4%; ▌Terrance Ruth (NP) 11.3%; ▌Eugene Myrick (NP) 6.4%; ▌James Shaughnessy IV (NP) 3.6%
Richmond, VA	Nov 5, 2024	Dem	Levar Stoney	2016; 2020	Incumbent term-limited. Democratic hold.	▌ ✓ Danny Avula (Dem) 46.0%; ▌Michelle Mosby (NP) 25.4%; ▌Harrison Roday (Dem) 11.3%; ▌Andreas Addison (NP) 11.9%; ▌Maurice Neblett (NP) 3.1%
Riverside, CA	Mar 5, 2024	NP	Patricia Lock Dawson	2020	Incumbent re-elected.	▌ ✓ Patricia Lock Dawson (NP) 77.6%; ▌Jessica Qattawi (NP) 22.4%
Sacramento, CA	Mar 5, 2024 (primary); Nov 5, 2024 (general)	Dem	Darrell Steinberg	2016; 2020	Incumbent term-limited. Democratic hold.	▌ ✓ Kevin McCarty (Dem) 50.7%; ▌Flojaune Cofer (NP) 49.3%
San Diego, CA	Mar 5, 2024 (primary); Nov 5, 2024 (general)	Dem	Todd Gloria	2020	Incumbent re-elected.	▌ ✓ Todd Gloria (Dem) 55.2%; ▌Larry Turner (NP) 44.8%
San Francisco, CA	Nov 5, 2024	Dem	London Breed	2018; 2019	Incumbent lost re-election. Democratic hold.	▌ ✓ Daniel Lurie (Dem) 55.0%; ▌London Breed (Dem) 45.0%
San Jose, CA	Mar 5, 2024	Dem	Matt Mahan	2022	Incumbent re-elected.	▌ ✓ Matt Mahan (Dem) 86.6%; ▌Tyrone Wade (NP) 13.4%
Santa Ana, CA	Nov 5, 2024	Dem	Valerie Amezcua	2022	Incumbent re-elected.	▌ ✓ Valerie Amezcua (Dem) 59.9%; ▌Ben Vazquez (NP) 40.1%
Scottsdale, AZ	Nov 5, 2024 (primary); Nov 5, 2024 (general)	Ind	David Ortega	2020	Incumbent lost re-election. Republican gain.	▌ ✓ Lisa Borowsky (Rep) 54.1%; ▌David Ortega (Ind) 45.6%
Stockton, CA	Mar 5, 2024 (primary); Nov 5, 2024 (general)	Rep	Kevin Lincoln	2020	Incumbent retired. Democratic gain.	▌ ✓ Christina Fugazi (Dem) 54.0%; ▌Tom Patti (Rep) 46.0%
Tulsa, OK	Aug 27, 2024 (general); Nov 5, 2024 (runoff)	Rep	G. T. Bynum	2020	Incumbent retired. Democratic gain.	▌ ✓ Monroe Nichols (Dem) 55.6%; ▌Karen Keith (Dem) 44.4%
Virginia Beach, VA	Nov 5, 2024	Rep	Bobby Dyer	2018; 2020	Incumbent re-elected.	▌ ✓ Bobby Dyer (Rep) 40.9%; ▌Sabrina Wooten (Dem) 31.7%; ▌John Moss (Rep) 17.1%; ▌Chris Taylor (Rep) 7.7%; ▌Richard Kowalewitch (Rep) 2.5%
Winston-Salem, NC	Mar 5, 2024 (primary); Nov 5, 2024 (general)	Dem	Allen Joines	2001; 2005; 2009; 2013; 2016; 2020	Incumbent re-elected.	▌ ✓ Allen Joines (Dem) 95.6%; ▌Write-ins 4.4%

=== County elections ===
- 2024 Alameda County District Attorney recall election
- 2024 Broome County Executive election
- 2024 Cook County, Illinois, elections
- 2024 Los Angeles County Board of Supervisors election
- 2024 Los Angeles County elections
- 2024 Maricopa County elections
- 2024 Miami-Dade County mayoral election
- 2024 Orange County, California elections
- 2024 Salt Lake County mayoral election
- 2024 San Diego County Board of Supervisors election
- 2024 Will County Executive election
