= 2021 Anchorage mayoral election =

- April 6, 2021 (first round); May 11, 2021 (runoff)
- Turnout: 31.88% (first round); 38.35% (runoff)
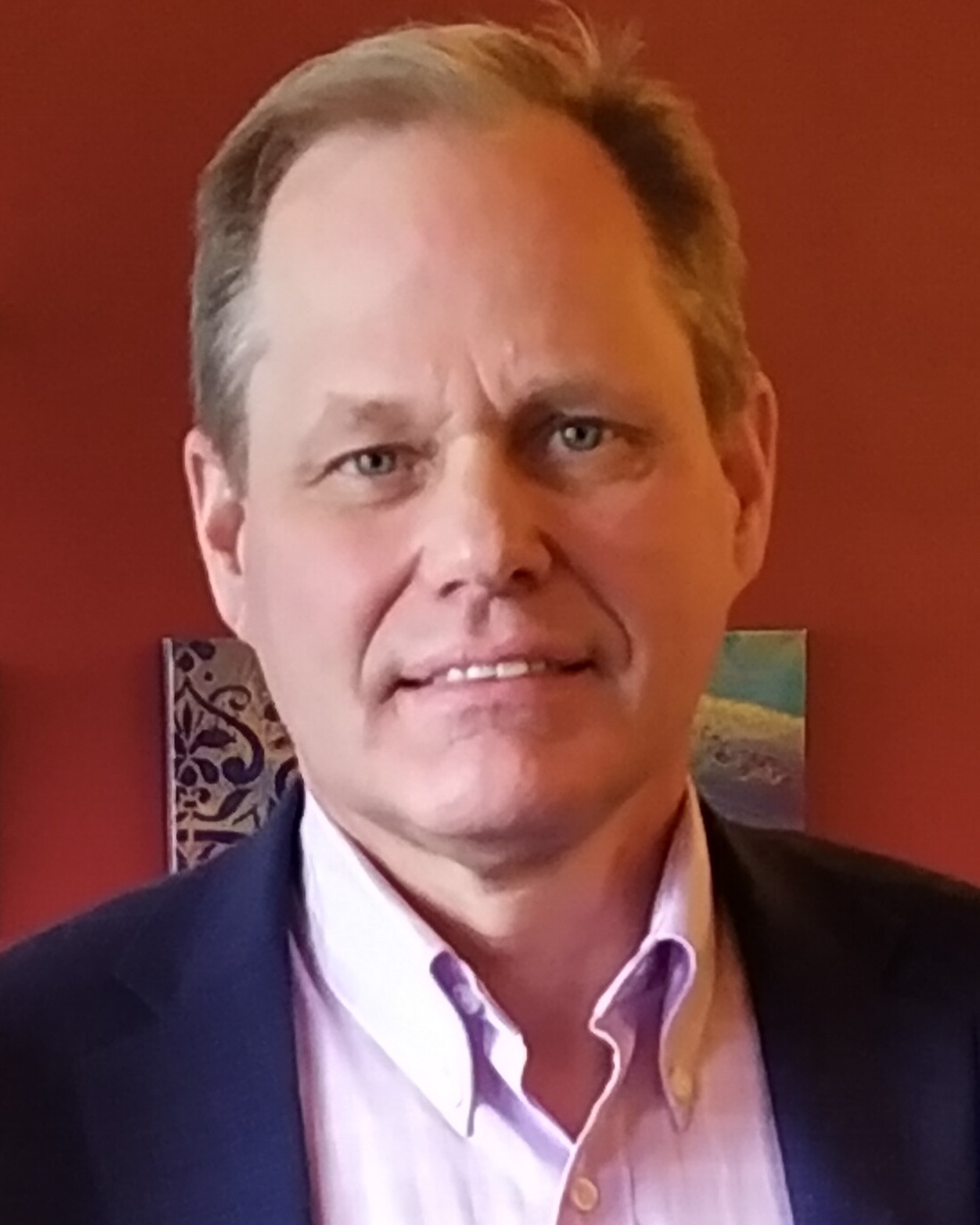

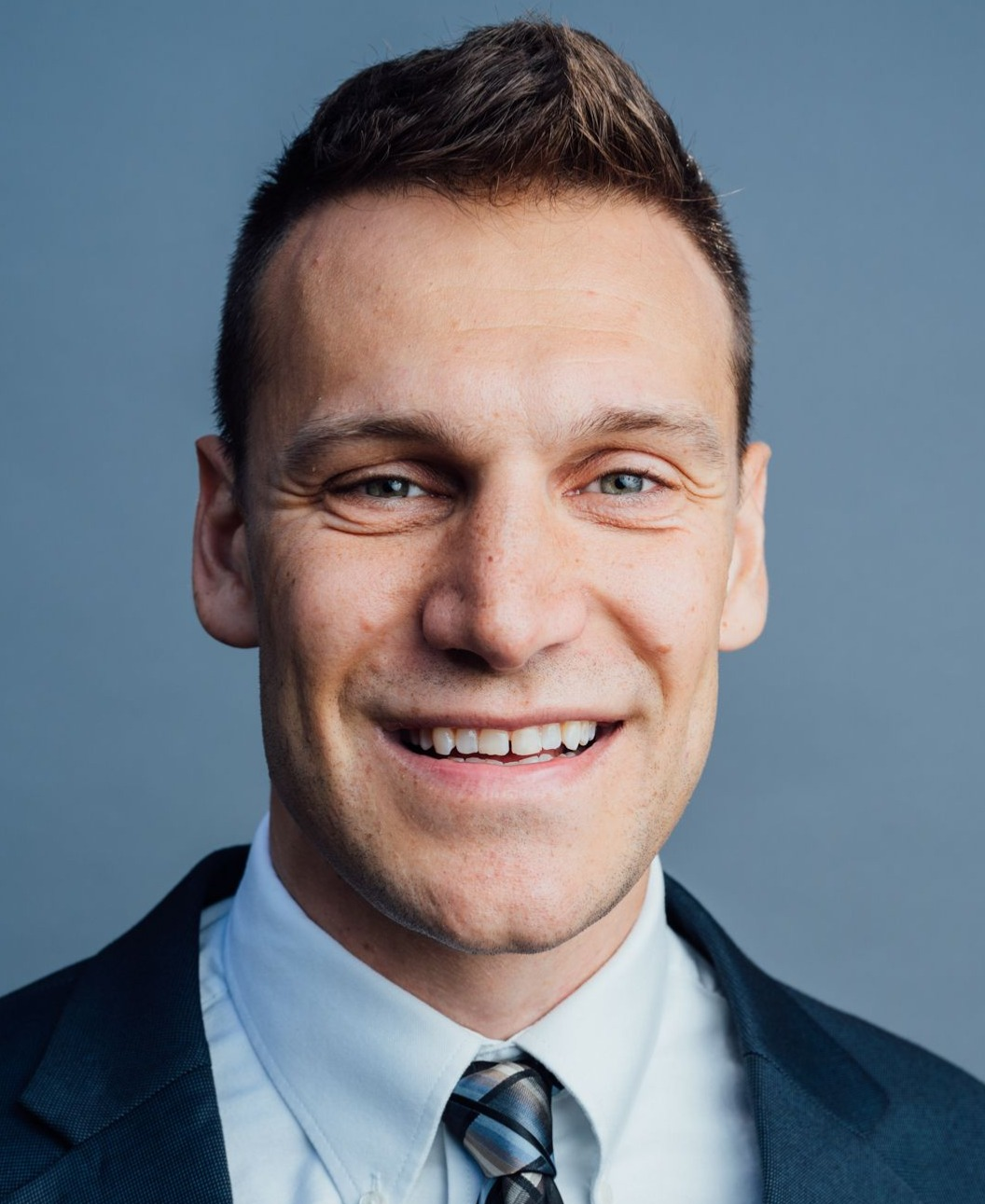

Candidate	Dave Bronson	Forrest Dunbar	Bill Falsey
First round	24,567; 32.96%	23,054; 30.93%	9,551; 12.82%
Runoff	45,937; 50.66%	44,744; 49.34%	Eliminated
Candidate	Bill Evans	Mike Robbins
First round	7,073; 9.49%	5,766; 7.74%
Runoff	Eliminated	Eliminated
Interactive map version
Runoff results by precinct:
Bronson:
50–60%
60–70%
70–80%
Dunbar:
50–60%
60–70%
70–80%
Mayor before election
Austin Quinn-Davidson
Independent
Elected Mayor
Dave Bronson
Republican

The 2021 Anchorage mayoral election was held on April 6, 2021, to elect the mayor of Anchorage, Alaska. As no candidate received at least 45% of the vote in the first round, the two candidates with the highest vote share, Forrest Dunbar and Dave Bronson, advanced to a runoff on May 11. The election was officially nonpartisan. Incumbent independent acting mayor Austin Quinn-Davidson, first appointed to the position in October 2020, was eligible to run for reelection to a full term, but did not run. The deadline to register to vote in the first round was March 7. Mail-in ballots were sent out starting on March 15. On May 21, 2021, after a narrow loss, Dunbar conceded the race to Bronson. Bronson was sworn in on July 1.

== Background ==
Ethan Berkowitz was elected mayor in 2015 and 2018 and was ineligible to run for a third term. On October 13, 2020, he announced his resignation through his chief of staff Jason Bockenstadt at a meeting of the Anchorage Assembly, Anchorage's city council, to be effective October 23. The resignation came after a reporter made allegations that he was engaged in an inappropriate relationship with her. Felix Rivera, chair of the Anchorage Assembly, was next in the line of succession to the office. After a failed attempt immediately following the resignation announcement, the Assembly met in a special meeting on October 16 to reorganize itself, installing Austin Quinn-Davidson as Assembly chair with Rivera as vice-chair. This move allowed Quinn-Davidson to succeed to the office of mayor and allowed Rivera to retain his position presiding over Assembly meetings. Quinn-Davidson is both the first female and first openly gay mayor of Anchorage. On November 4, the Assembly voted not to hold a special election for the position of mayor, meaning that the next election for the seat would be the regularly scheduled one in 2021.

== General election ==
In the leadup to the general election, it was widely believed that there would be a runoff between Dunbar and one of the more conservative candidates.

=== Candidates ===
==== Major candidates ====
- Dave Bronson (Republican), former U.S. Air Force and commercial pilot
- Forrest Dunbar (Democratic), Member of the Anchorage Assembly (2016–present), member of the Alaska Army National Guard
- Bill Evans (Independent), Member of the Anchorage Assembly (2014–2017), board and two-time co-chair of the Anchorage Chamber of Commerce
- Bill Falsey (Independent), Anchorage Municipal Manager (2017–2020)
- George Martinez (Democratic), educator, former special assistant to Ethan Berkowitz for economic development
- Mike Robbins (Republican), businessman

==== Other registered candidates ====
- Anna Anthony
- Jeffrey Brown, social services worker
- Darin Colbry (Republican), candidate for Governor of Alaska in 2018
- Heather Herndon, real estate developer, construction, project manager, accountant, portfolio private placement financier
- Jacob Seth Kern (Democratic), perennial candidate
- Reza Momin
- Albert Swank Jr., civil engineer
- Jacob Versteeg, compliance examiner
- Joe Westfall

==== Withdrawn ====
- Eric Croft (Democratic), former state representative, former member of the Anchorage Assembly, former president of the Anchorage School Board, and candidate for governor of Alaska in 2006
- Dustin Darden, maintenance worker and perennial candidate
- Nelson Jesus Godoy, activist and candidate for mayor in 2018

==== Declined ====
- Austin Quinn-Davidson (Independent), incumbent acting mayor

=== Endorsements ===
Dave Bronson (R)
- Jamie Allard, current Anchorage Assemblyman
- Rick Mystrom, former mayor (also endorsed Martinez and Robbins)
- Dan Sullivan, current United States Senator from Alaska
Forrest Dunbar (D)

State officials

- Johnny Ellis, former Majority Leader of the Alaska Senate

Organizations

- AFL–CIO
- AFSCME Local 52
- Anchorage Democratic Party
- Anchorage Education Association
- Anchorage Firefighters Union
- Ironworkers Union Local 751
- IBEW Local 1547
- International Union of Operating Engineers Local 302
- Laborers' Union, Alaska District
- Planned Parenthood (also endorsed Martinez)
- Teamsters Local 959
- Plumbers and Steamfitters Local 367
Bill Evans (I)
- Chuck Kopp, former state representative (Republican)
- Dan Sullivan, former mayor, nominee for Lieutenant Governor of Alaska in 2014, and candidate for U.S. Senate in 2016 (Republican) (no relation to U.S. Senator from Alaska Dan Sullivan)
George Martinez (D)

People

- Rick Mystrom, former mayor (Republican) (also endorsed Bronson and Robbins)

Organizations

- Planned Parenthood (also endorsed Dunbar)
Mike Robbins (R)
- Rick Mystrom, former mayor (also endorsed Bronson and Martinez)

=== Fundraising ===
Campaign finance reports as of February 18, 2021
Candidate (party, if known)	Total raised
Anna Anthony	did not file
Dave Bronson (R)	$162,482
Jeffrey Brown	did not file
Darin Colbry (R)	$0
Forrest Dunbar (D)	$252,216
Bill Evans (I)	$98,480
Bill Falsey (I)	$106,285
Heather Herndon	$0
Jacob Seth Kern (D)	did not file
George Martinez (D)	$60,086
Reza Momin	did not file
Mike Robbins (R)	$210,058
Albert Swank Jr.	$0
Jacob Versteeg	did not file
Joe Westfall	did not file

=== Debates ===
Five candidates did not participate in either debate: Anna Anthony, Darin Colbry, Jacob Seth Kern, Reza Momin, and Jacob Versteeg.

2021 Anchorage mayoral election debates
No.	Date & time	Host	Moderator	Link	Participants									
Key: P Participant A Absent N Non-invitee I Invitee														
Key: P Participant A Absent N Non-invitee I Invitee					Dave Bronson	Jeffrey Brown	Forrest Dunbar	Bill Evans	Bill Falsey	Heather Herndon	George Martinez	Mike Robbins	Albert Swank Jr.	Joe Westfall
1	February 16, 2021	Anchorage Daily News	Tom Hewitt	Video	P	N	P	P	P	N	P	P	N	N
2	March 18, 2021	West Anchorage; Community Councils	Tahnee Seccarccia	Video	P	P	P	P	P	P	P	P	P	P

=== Polling ===
Poll source	Date(s) administered	Sample size (Note: Key: A – all adults RV – registered voters LV – likely voters V – unclear)	Margin of error	Dave Bronson	Forrest Dunbar	Bill Falsey	Mike Robbins	Other	Undecided
Independent pollster at APOC	Released March 8, 2021	– (V) (Note: Not yet released)	–	20%	22%	8%	8%	9% (Note: Bill Evans with 5%; George Martinez with 2%; Other (5 candidates) with 2%)	33%

=== Results ===
General election results
Party	Candidate	Votes	%
Nonpartisan	Dave Bronson	24,567	32.96
Nonpartisan	Forrest Dunbar	23,054	30.93
Nonpartisan	Bill Falsey	9,551	12.82
Nonpartisan	Bill Evans	7,073	9.49
Nonpartisan	Mike Robbins	5,766	7.74
Nonpartisan	George Martinez	2,753	3.69
Nonpartisan	Heather Herndon	451	0.61
Nonpartisan	Jeffrey Brown	307	0.41
Nonpartisan	Anna Anthony	306	0.41
Nonpartisan	Albert Swank Jr.	231	0.31
Nonpartisan	Joe Westfall	83	0.11
Nonpartisan	Jacob Seth Kern	52	0.07
Nonpartisan	Reza Momin	52	0.07
Nonpartisan	Jacob Versteeg	43	0.06
Nonpartisan	Darin Colbry	31	0.04
Write-in		205	0.28
Total votes		74,525	100.00

== Runoff ==
In the leadup to the runoff, third-place primary finisher Falsey and sixth-place finisher Martinez endorsed Dunbar, while fifth-place finisher Robbins endorsed Bronson. Fourth-place finisher Evans did not make an endorsement.

=== Forum ===
2021 Anchorage mayoral election runoff candidate forum
No.	Date & time	Host	Moderator	Link	Participants	
Key: P Participant A Absent N Non-invitee I Invitee						
Key: P Participant A Absent N Non-invitee I Invitee					Dave Bronson	Forrest Dunbar
1	May 3, 2021	Alaska Public Media	Kathleen McCoy	Video	P	P

=== Polling ===
Poll source	Date(s) administered	Sample size	Margin of error	Dave Bronson	Forrest Dunbar	Undecided
Alaska Survey Research	April 9–12, 2021	322 (LV)	± 5.5%	44%	45%	11%

=== Results ===
Runoff results
Party	Candidate	Votes	%
Nonpartisan	Dave Bronson	45,937	50.66
Nonpartisan	Forrest Dunbar	44,744	49.34
Total votes		90,681	100.00
