= 2016 Winston-Salem mayoral election =

Winston-Salem mayoral election, 2016
- November 8, 2016
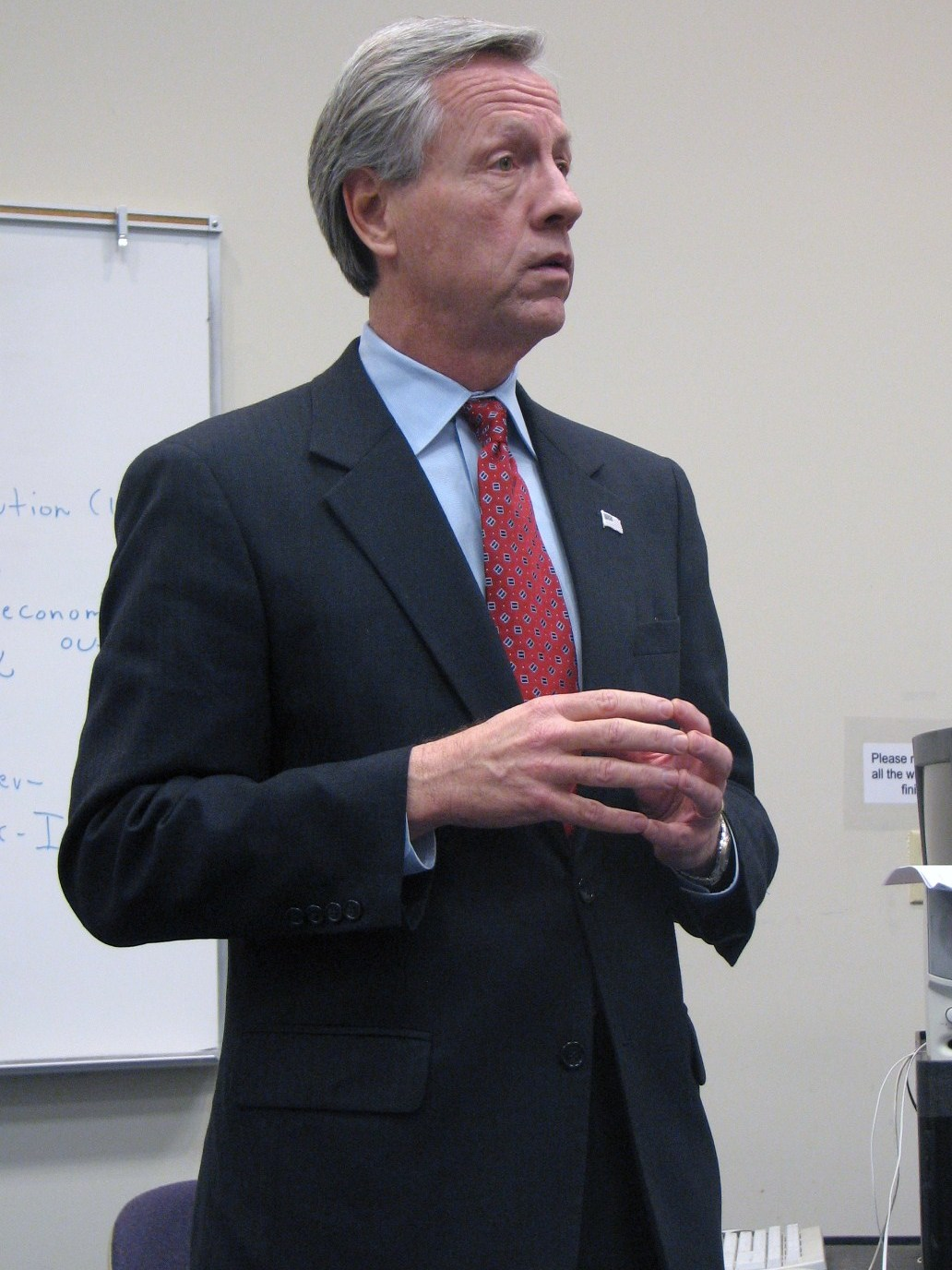
Nominee	Allen Joines
Party	Democratic
Popular vote	88,784
Percentage	94.07%
Mayor before election
Allen Joines
Democratic
Elected mayor
Allen Joines
Democratic

The 2016 Winston-Salem mayoral election was held on November 8, 2016, to elect the mayor of Winston-Salem, North Carolina. It saw the reelection of Allen Joines.

This election saw mayoral elections in Winston-Salem shift from odd-numbered years to presidential election years.

== General election ==
General election results
Party	Candidate	Votes	%
Democratic	Allen Joines (incumbent)	88,784	94.07
Write-In	Joanne "Jo" Allen (write-in)	3,167	3.36
Write-In	Other write-ins	2,430	2.57
Total votes		94,381	
