= 2009 Winston-Salem mayoral election =

City election in North Carolina, US

Winston-Salem mayoral election, 2009
- November 3, 2009
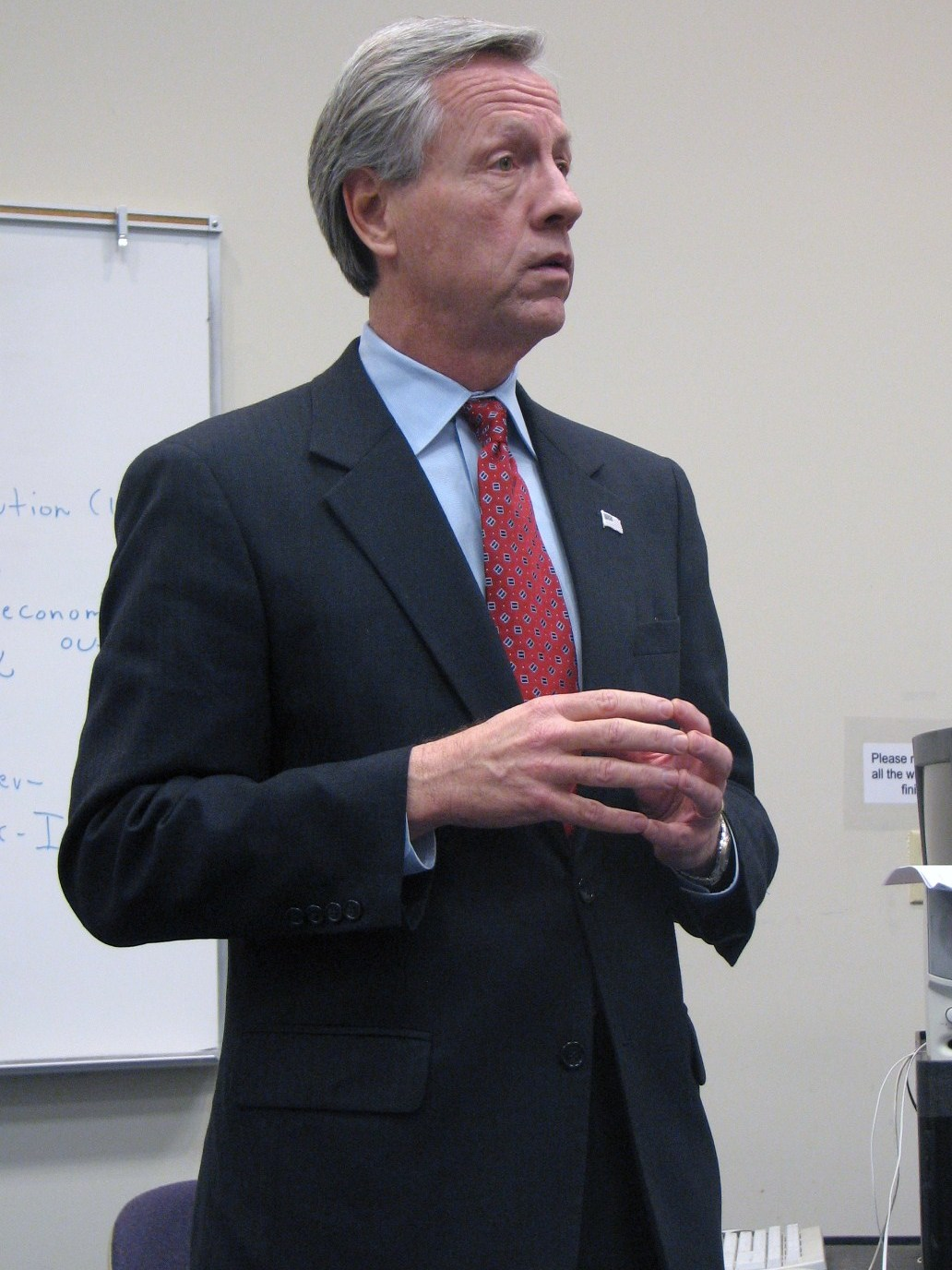
Nominee	Allen Joines
Party	Democratic
Popular vote	9,585
Percentage	90.65%
Mayor before election
Allen Joines
Democratic
Elected mayor
Allen Joines
Democratic

The 2009 Winston-Salem mayoral election was held on November 3, 2009, to elect the mayor of Winston-Salem, North Carolina. It saw the reelection of Allen Joines.

== General election ==
General election results
Party	Candidate	Votes	%
Democratic	Allen Joines (incumbent)	9,585	90.65
Write-in	Write-in	989	9.35
