= 2020 Winston-Salem mayoral election =

Winston-Salem mayoral election, 2020
- November 3, 2020
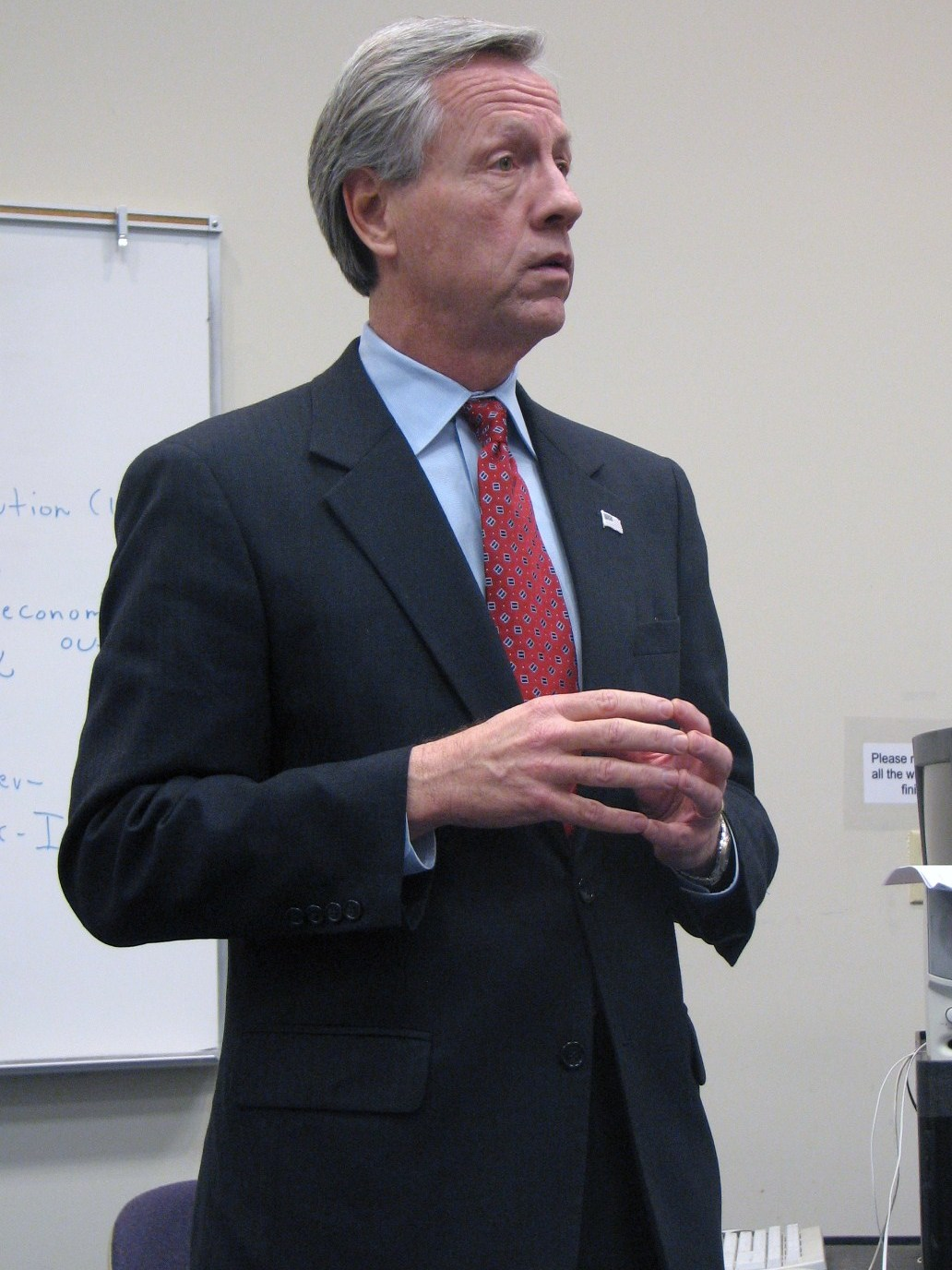

Nominee	Allen Joines	Kris McCann
Party	Democratic	Republican
Popular vote	85,705	33,317
Percentage	71.7%	27.9%
- Precinct Results; Joines: 50–60% 60–70% 70–80% 80–90% ≥90% McCann: 50–60% 60–70% ≥90% Tie: 50%
Mayor before election
Allen Joines
Democratic
Elected mayor
Allen Joines
Democratic

The 2020 Winston-Salem mayoral election was held on November 3, 2020, to elect the mayor of Winston-Salem, North Carolina.

== Candidates ==
=== Democratic ===
==== Nominated ====
- Allen Joines, incumbent mayor

==== Defeated in primary ====
- JoAnne Allen

=== Republican ===
==== Nominated ====
- Kris McCann, 2012 & 2014 candidate for state House of Representatives

== General election ==
General election results
Party	Candidate	Votes	%
Democratic	Allen Joines (incumbent)	85,705	71.71
Republican	Kris McCann	33,317	27.88
Write-In	Write-ins	488	2.57
Total votes		119,506	
