= 2005 Winston-Salem mayoral election =

Winston-Salem mayoral election, 2005
- November 8, 2005
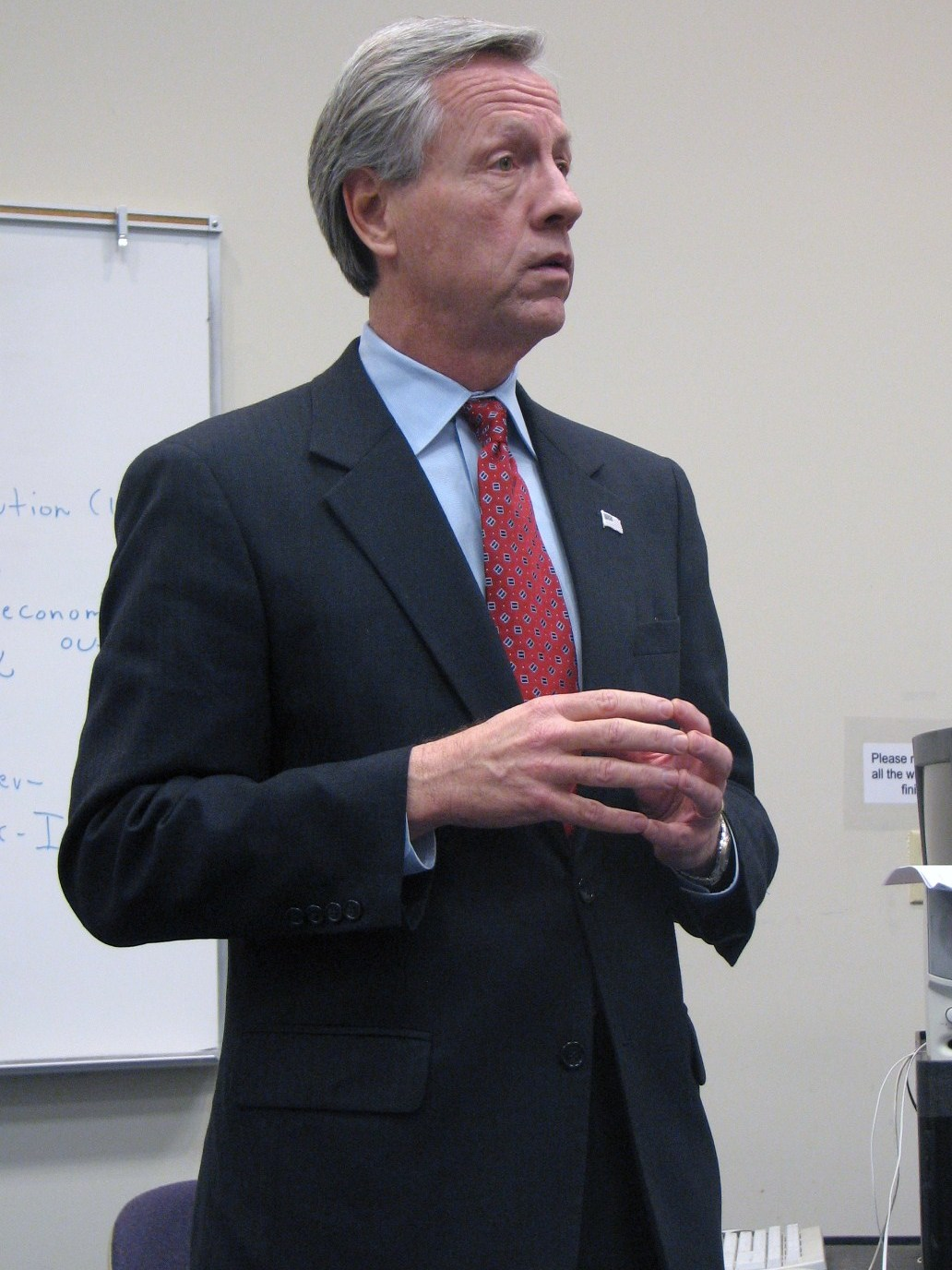
Nominee	Allen Joines
Party	Democratic
Popular vote	10,014
Percentage	98%
Mayor before election
Allen Joines
Democratic
Elected mayor
Allen Joines
Democratic

The 2005 Winston-Salem mayoral election was held on November 8, 2005, to elect the mayor of Winston-Salem, North Carolina. It saw the reelection of Allen Joines.

== General election ==
General election results
Party	Candidate	Votes	%
Democratic	Allen Joines (incumbent)	10,014	98
Write-in	Write-in	238	2
