= 2024 Winston-Salem mayoral election =

Winston-Salem mayoral election, 2024
- November 5, 2024
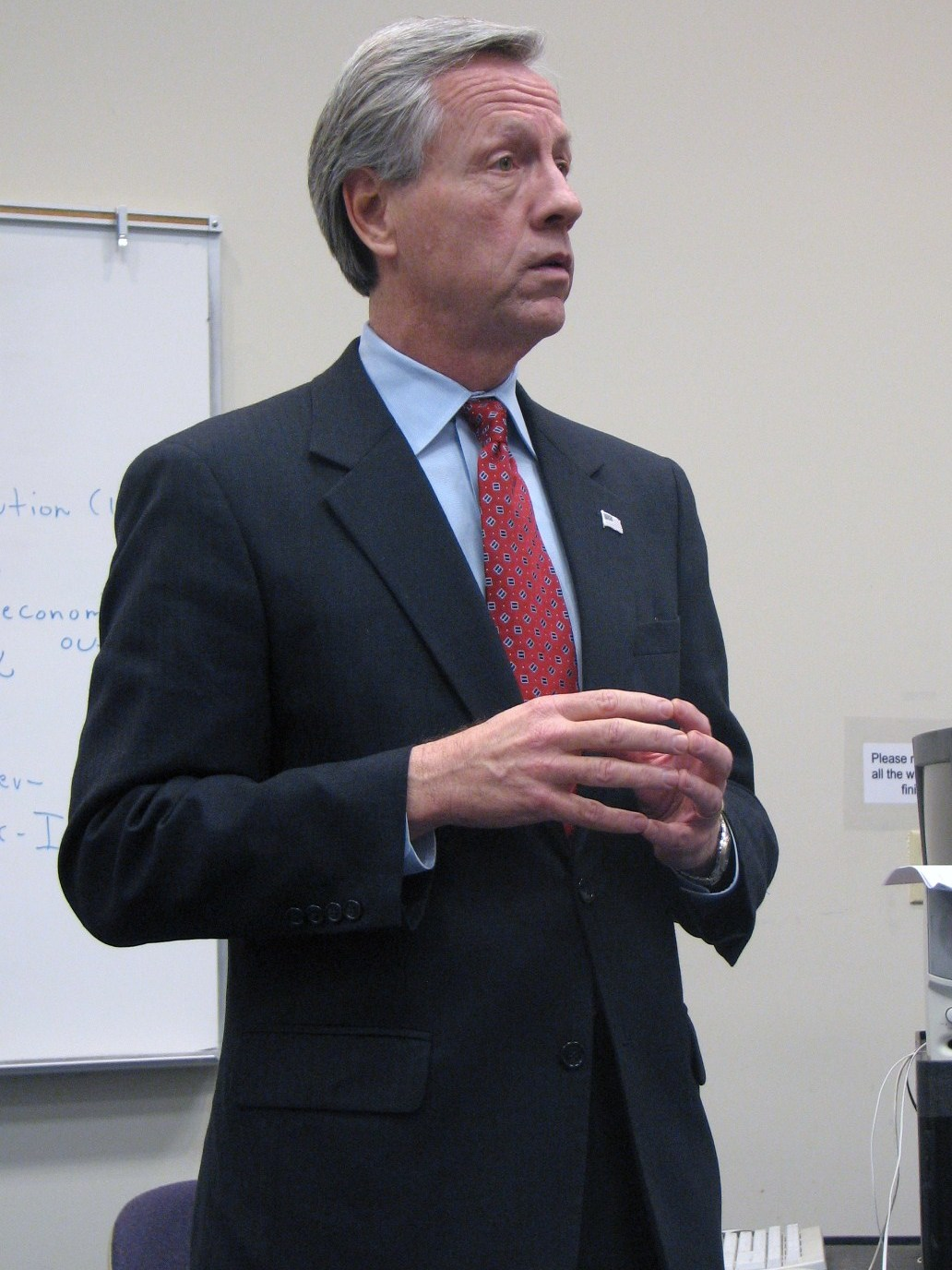
Nominee	Allen Joines
Party	Democratic
Popular vote	89,251
Percentage	95.73%
Mayor before election
Allen Joines
Democratic
Elected mayor
Allen Joines
Democratic

The 2024 Winston-Salem mayoral election was held on November 5, 2024, to elect the mayor of Winston-Salem, North Carolina.

== Democratic primary ==
=== Candidates ===
==== Nominated ====
- Allen Joines, incumbent mayor

==== Defeated in primary ====
- JoAnne Allen
- Frankie Gist

=== Results ===
2024 Winston-Salem Democratic primary election
Party	Candidate	Votes	%
Democratic	Allen Joines (incumbent)	15,960	72.91%
Democratic	JoAnne Allen	4,432	20.25%
Democratic	Frankie Gist	1,499	6.85%
Total votes		21,891	100.00%

== Write in candidates ==
- Denise Adams
- Martin Avery
- Rick Bottoms
- William Burns
- Algenon Cash
- Robert Clark
- Elizabeth Dentiste
- James Douglas
- Jeff Dudley
- Jeremy Esbrandt
- Dale Folwell
- Matt Lameo
- Kris McCann
- Mark Owens
- Chris Paul
- James Rutledge
- Wake Wagner

== General election ==
=== Results ===
2024 Winston-Salem mayoral election results
Party	Candidate	Votes	%
Democratic	Allen Joines	89,251	95.73%
Write-In	Write-ins	3,991	4.27%
Total votes		93,242	100.00%
