= Ramras =

Ramras is a surname. Notable people with the surname include:

- Jay Ramras (born 1964), American businessman and politician
- Rachel Ramras (born 1974), American actress, comedian, and television writer
