= Andrew Halcro =

American politician and businessman (born 1964)

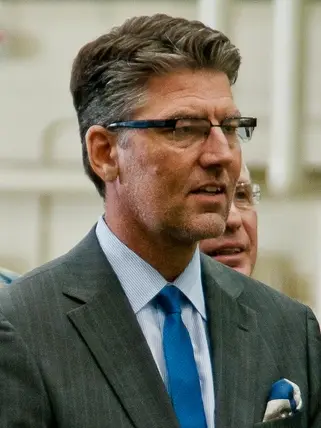
- Halcro in 2014

Member of the Alaska House of Representatives from the 12th district
- In office 1998–2003
- Preceded by: Mark Hanley
- Succeeded by: John Harris

Personal details
- Born: September 20, 1964 (age 61) San Francisco, California, U.S.
- Party: Independent (since 2006); Republican (until 2006)
- Children: 2

Andrew Halcro (born September 20, 1964) is an American politician and businessman from Anchorage, Alaska. Formerly a Republican member of the Alaska House of Representatives, he ran for Governor of Alaska as an independent candidate in the 2006 election, placing third with 9.46 percent of the vote.

== Early life and education ==
Halcro was born in San Francisco, California on September 20, 1964. After graduating from East Anchorage High School, he attended Willamette University and the University of Alaska Anchorage.

== Career ==
=== Business career ===
Halcro was director of sales and marketing for Avis Rent a Car of Alaska and a board member of the Avis Licensee Association from 1990. From 2002 he was president of Avis Alaska. He stepped down as president and chief executive officer when he launched his 2006 gubernatorial campaign, but returned to the company following the election.

=== Alaska House of Representatives ===
In 1998, he ran for the Alaska House of Representatives as a Republican, winning both the primary and the general election. In 2000, he won the Republican primary and was unopposed in the general election. He did not seek re-election in 2002.

=== Gubernatorial race ===
Halcro ran for Governor of Alaska in 2006 as an independent candidate. His gubernatorial campaign emphasised community health, economic wellbeing, the state's marketing efforts and small business. On election day, Halcro finished third, receiving 22,443 votes, 9.46 percent of the total. Republican nominee Sarah Palin won the election with 114,697 votes, 48.33 percent and former Governor Tony Knowles finished second, with 40.97 percent.

=== Later career ===
After losing his gubernatorial bid, Halcro began a political blog, through which he became a prominent critic of Palin's administration and publicized the scandal surrounding Palin's July 2008 dismissal of a Public Safety Commissioner. Palin later criticized Halcro in her memoir Going Rogue.

Halcro said in September 2009 that he would run for the United States House of Representatives in Alaska's at-large congressional district in 2010, but in February 2010 said he was reconsidering his decision. He became president of the Anchorage Chamber of Commerce in 2012.

In January 2015 Halcro filed a letter of intent to run for Mayor of Anchorage. He declared his intention to run later that month, and said he was running because "We need a healthy economy, a healthy community, and we need trust." He placed third in the first round of the election and did not advance to the runoff election.

Halcro ran as an independent candidate in the 2022 special election to succeed Don Young in Alaska's at-large congressional district. He finished eleventh in the blanket primary, with 1.87 percent of the vote.

== Electoral history ==
2006 Alaska gubernatorial election
| Party | Candidate | Votes | % | ±% |
|---|---|---|---|---|
| Republican | Sarah Palin | 114,697 | 48.33 | −7.6 |
| Democratic | Tony Knowles | 97,238 | 40.97 | +0.3 |
| Independent | Andrew Halcro | 22,443 | 9.46 | n/a |
| Independence | Don Wright | 1,285 | 0.54 | −0.4 |
| Libertarian | Billy Toien | 682 | 0.29 | −0.2 |
| Green | David Massie | 593 | 0.25 | −1.0 |
| Write-in candidate | Write-in votes | 384 | 0.16 | +0.1 |
| Plurality | | 17,459 | 7.36 | |
| Turnout | | 238,307 | 51.1 | |
| Republican hold | | Swing | -7.6 | |

2015 Anchorage mayoral election, First round results
| Party | Candidate | Votes | % |
|---|---|---|---|
| Nonpartisan | Ethan Berkowitz | 20,451 | 37.01 |
| Nonpartisan | Amy Demboski | 13,337 | 24.13 |
| Nonpartisan | Andrew Halcro | 11,956 | 21.64 |
| Nonpartisan | Dan Coffey | 7,960 | 14.40 |
| Nonpartisan | Dustin Darden | 571 | 1.03 |
| Nonpartisan | Lance Ahern | 395 | 0.71 |
| Nonpartisan | Paul Bauer | 217 | 0.39 |
| Nonpartisan | Timothy Huit | 120 | 0.22 |
| Nonpartisan | Jacob Seth Kern | 57 | 0.10 |
| Nonpartisan | Christopher Jamison | 45 | 0.08 |
| Nonpartisan | Samuel Joe Speziale | 31 | 0.06 |
| Write-in | Write-ins | 120 | 0.22 |
| Turnout | | 55,260 | 27.0 |
