= 2010 United States House of Representatives election in Alaska =

- November 2, 2010
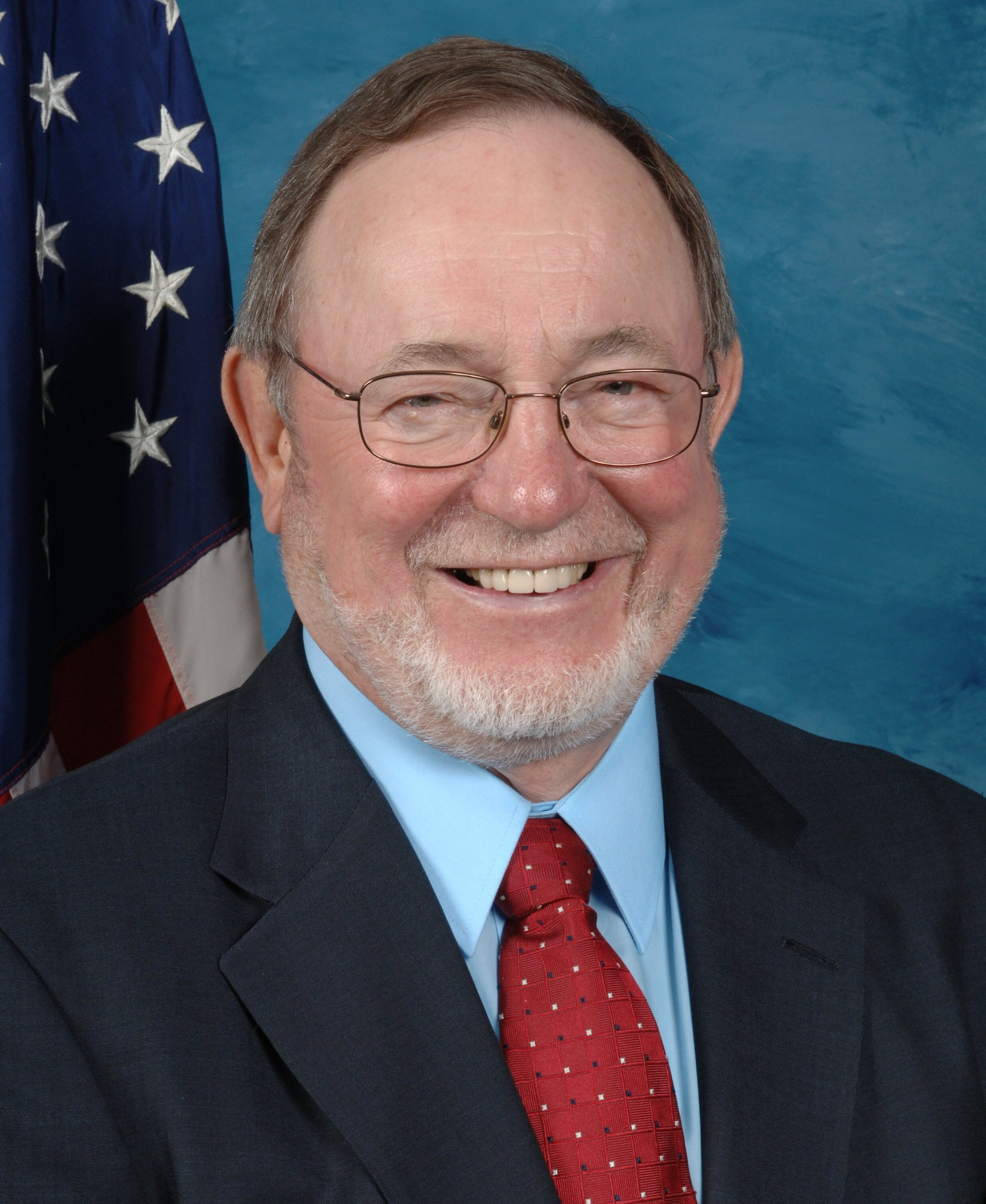

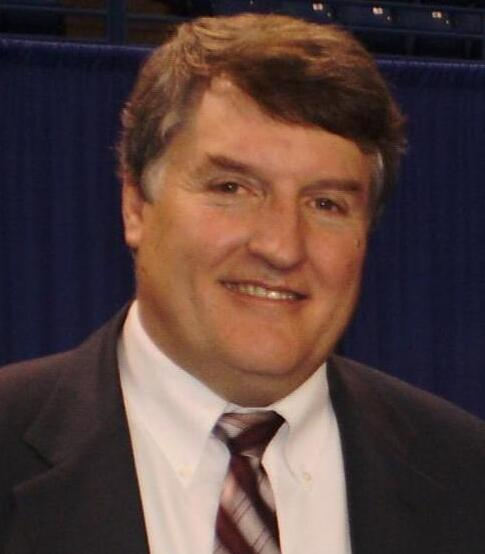
Nominee	Don Young	Harry Crawford
Party	Republican	Democratic
Popular vote	175,384	77,606
Percentage	68.96%	30.51%
- Results by state house district Young: 50–60% 60–70% 70–80% 80–90% Crawford: 50–60%
U.S. Representative before election
Don Young
Republican
Elected U.S. Representative
Don Young
Republican

An election was held on November 2, 2010, to determine the U.S. representative for Alaska's at-large congressional district, which includes the entire state of Alaska. Don Young, the incumbent and a member of the Republican Party, was re-elected to a twentieth term to serve in the 112th Congress from January 3, 2011, until January 3, 2013. A primary election was held on August 24, 2010.

Alaska's population was 66 percent white, 13 percent Native American, 6 percent Hispanic and 4 percent Asian (see Race and ethnicity in the United States census); 91 percent were high school graduates and 27 percent had received a bachelor's degree or higher. Its median income was $66,293. In the 2008 presidential election, Alaska gave 59 percent of its vote to Republican nominee John McCain and 38 percent to Democratic nominee Barack Obama. Republican Don Young was the incumbent. Young was re-elected with 50 percent of the vote in 2008.

== Republican primary ==
Alaska's at-large district Republican primary, August 24, 2010
Party	Candidate	Votes	%
Republican	Don Young (incumbent)	74,310	70.35
Republican	Sheldon Fisher	24,709	23.39
Republican	John R. Cox	6,605	6.25
Total votes		105,624	100.00

== General election ==
=== Campaign ===
In 2010 Young's opponent in the general election was Democratic nominee Harry Crawford, a member of the Alaska House of Representatives and former ironworker. John R. Cox and Sheldon Fisher, a former telecommunications executive, also sought the Republican nomination. Andrew Halcro, a former member of the state House of Representatives who unsuccessfully tan for Governor of Alaska in 2006, said in September 2009 that he would challenge Young in the 2010 Republican primary, but in February 2010 said he was reconsidering his decision. Gabrielle LeDoux, a former member of the state House of Representatives who sought the Republican nomination in the district in 2008, said in July 2009 that she would not run in 2010 if Young sought re-election. Crawford was unopposed for the Democratic nomination. Ethan Berkowitz, the former minority leader of the state House of Representatives who unsuccessfully challenged Young as the Democratic nominee in 2008, said in December of that year that he was considering running again, but said in July 2009 that he would not run.

Young raised $1,001,015 and spent $887,310. Crawford raised $240,439 and spent $235,571. Fisher raised $177,981 and spent the same amount.

In a poll of 710 voters, conducted by Public Policy Polling (PPP) on January 27 and 28, 2010, Young led with 49 percent to Crawford's 34 percent, while 17 percent were undecided. A PPP poll of 1,306 likely voters, conducted on August 27 and 28, 2010, found that Young had the support of 55 percent while 36 percent favored Crawford and 8 percent were undecided. In a poll of 573 registered and likely voters, conducted between September 23 and 27, 2010, by Ivan Moore Research, Young led with 65 percent to Crawford's 32 percent, while 4 percent were undecided. A poll of 1,678 likely voters, conducted by PPP on October 9 and 10, 2010, found Young leading Crawford by 58 percent to 36 percent, while 6 percent were undecided. Prior to the election FiveThirtyEight's forecast gave Young a 100 percent chance of winning and projected that he would receive 65 percent of the vote to Crawford's 35 percent. On election day Young was re-elected with 69 percent to Crawford's 31 percent.

=== Predictions ===
Source	Ranking	As of
The Cook Political Report	Safe R	November 1, 2010
Rothenberg	Safe R	November 1, 2010
Sabato's Crystal Ball	Safe R	November 1, 2010
RCP	Safe R	November 1, 2010
CQ Politics	Safe R	October 28, 2010
New York Times	Safe R	November 1, 2010
FiveThirtyEight	Safe R	November 1, 2010

=== Results ===
Alaska's at-large district general election, November 2, 2010
Party	Candidate	Votes	%
Republican	Don Young (incumbent)	175,384	68.96
Democratic	Harry Crawford	77,606	30.51
Write-in		1,345	0.53
Total votes		254,335	100.00
Republican hold			

== See also ==
- List of United States representatives from Alaska
- Alaska's congressional delegations
