= 2001 Winston-Salem mayoral election =

Winston-Salem mayoral election, 2001
- November 6, 2001
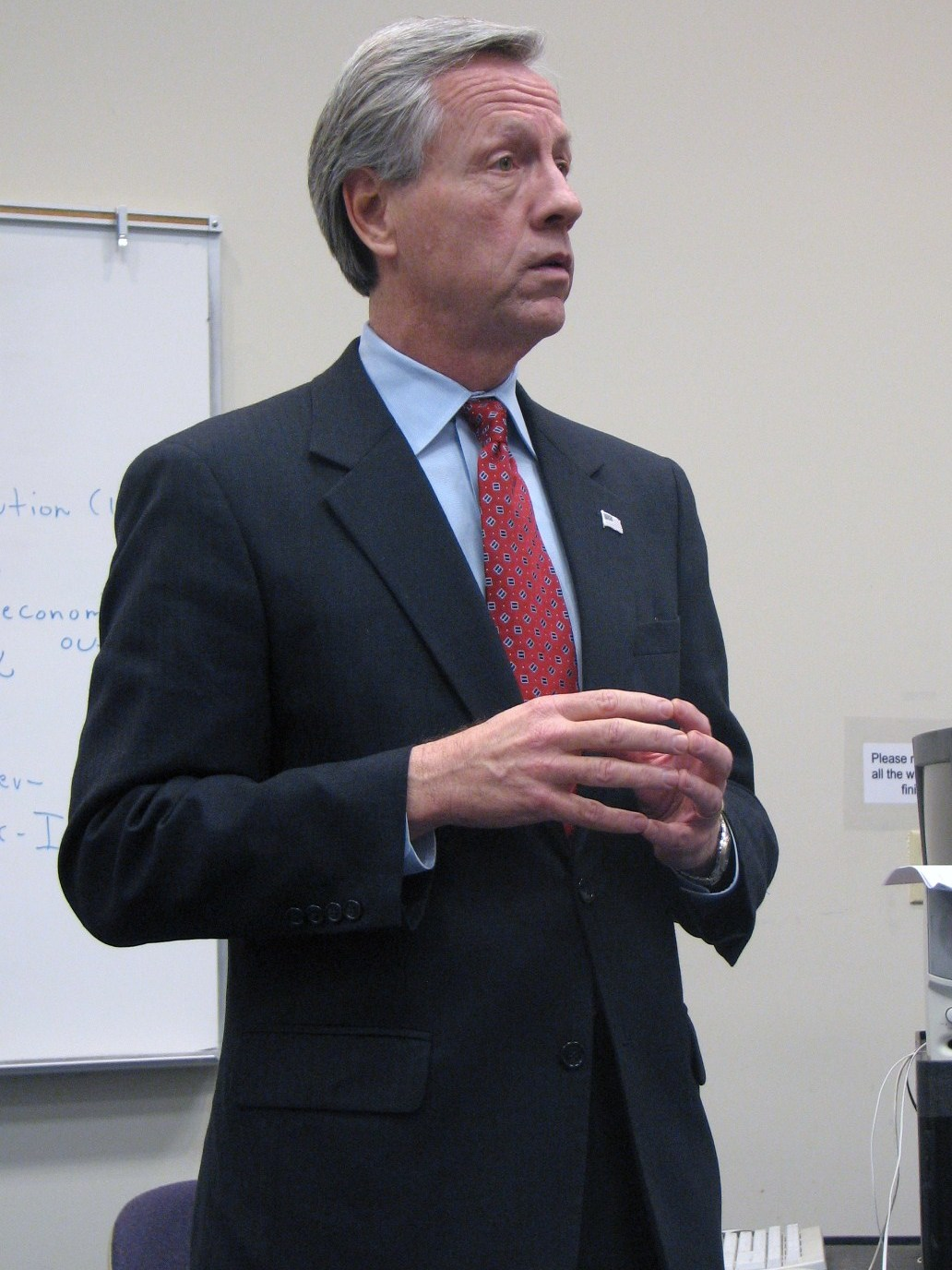

Nominee	Allen Joines	Jack Canvanagh
Party	Democratic	Republican
Popular vote	23,893	6,546
Percentage	78.29%	21.54%
Mayor before election
Jack Cavanagh
Republican
Elected mayor
Allen Joines
Democratic

The 2001 Winston-Salem mayoral election was held on November 6, 2001, to elect the mayor of Winston-Salem, North Carolina. It saw the election of Allen Joines, who defeated incumbent mayor Jack Canvanagh.

== Primaries ==
The date of the primaries was September 25, 2001.

=== Democratic primary ===
Democratic primary results
Party	Candidate	Votes	%
Democratic	Allen Joines	5,723	85.57
Democratic	Ann Wagoner	965	14.42

=== Republican primary ===
Republican primary results
Party	Candidate	Votes	%
Republican	Jack Cavanagh Jr. (incumbent)	2,006	57.54
Republican	Ted Evans	1,159	33.24
Republican	Alfred Abdo Jr.	321	9.20

== General election ==
General election results
Party	Candidate	Votes	%
Democratic	Allen Joines	23,893	78.29
Republican	Jack Cavanaugh, Jr. (incumbent)	6,546	21.54
Write-In	Write-ins	48	0.15
Total votes		30,487	
