= 2013 Winston-Salem mayoral election =

Winston-Salem mayoral election, 2013
- November 5, 2013
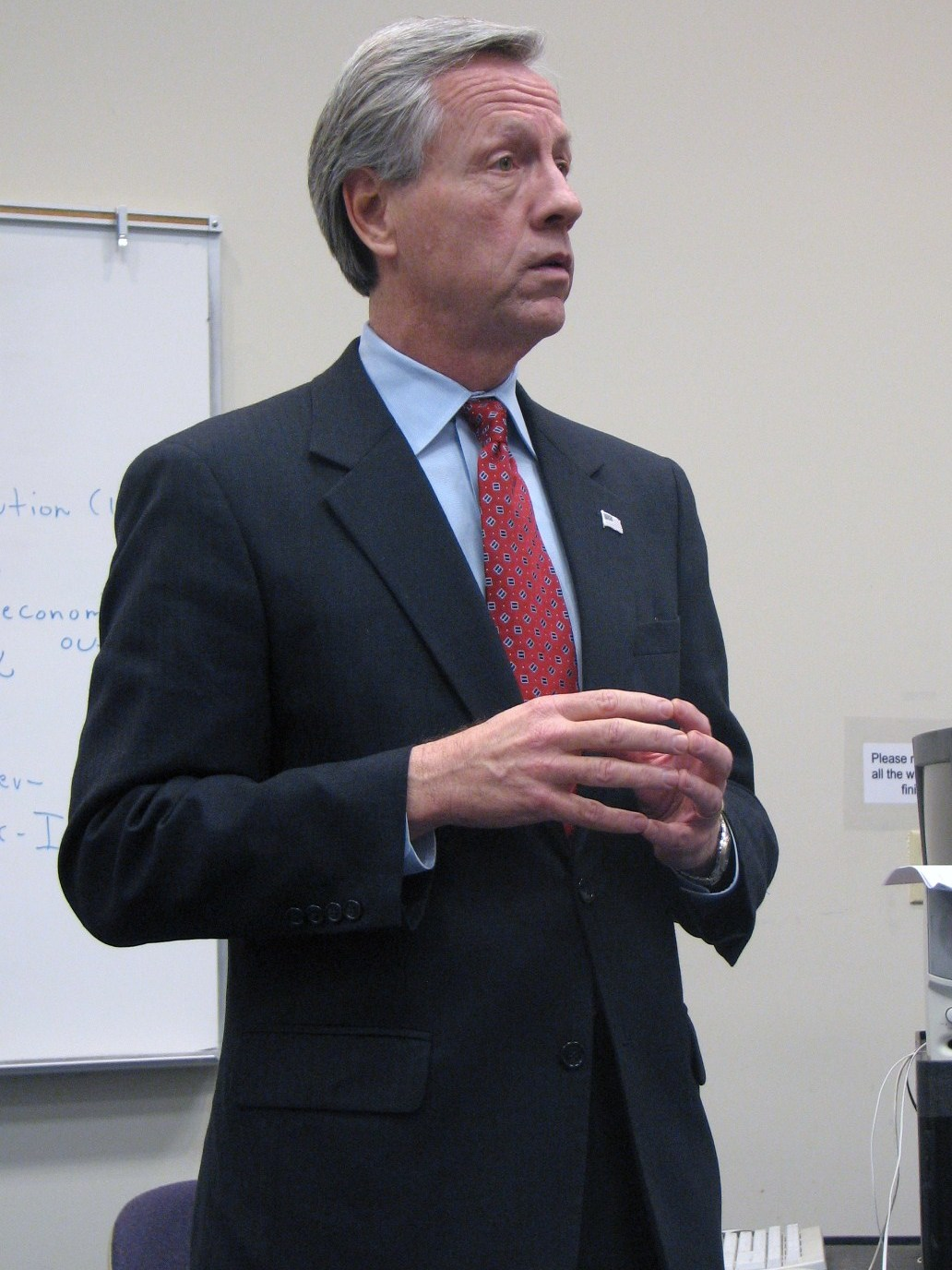

Nominee	Allen Joines	James Lee Knox
Party	Democratic	Republican
Popular vote	12,948	2,315
Percentage	84.33%	15.08%
Mayor before election
Allen Joines
Democratic
Elected mayor
Allen Joines
Democratic

The 2013 Winston-Salem mayoral election was held on November 5, 2013, to elect the mayor of Winston-Salem, North Carolina. It saw the reelection of Allen Joines.

== Democratic primary ==
Democratic primary results
Party	Candidate	Votes	%
Democratic	Allen Joines (incumbent)	8,825	88.42
Democratic	Gardenia M. Henley	1,156	11.58

== General election ==
While he kept his name on the ballot, Knox stopped actively campaigning in August when it became public knowledge that he had used a racial epithet to describe a county elections worker in 2012.

General election results
Party	Candidate	Votes	%
Democratic	Allen Joines (incumbent)	12,948	84.33
Republican	James Lee Knox	2,315	15.08
Write-In	Mike Monu (write-in)	6	0.04
Write-In	Other write-ins	85	0.55
Total votes		15,354	
