= Austin Quinn-Davidson =

Alaska politician

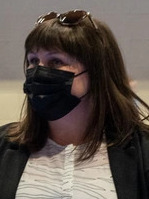
- Quinn-Davidson in 2021

Mayor of Anchorage
- Acting
- In office October 23, 2020 – July 1, 2021
- Preceded by: Ethan Berkowitz
- Succeeded by: Dave Bronson

Personal details
- Born: October 29, 1979 (age 46) Sacramento, California, U.S.
- Party: Independent
- Education: University of California, Santa Barbara (BA); University of California, Davis (JD)
- Website: Campaign website
- Nickname: AQD

Austin Quinn-Davidson (born October 29, 1979) is an American politician and attorney who served as the acting mayor of Anchorage, Alaska after the resignation of Ethan Berkowitz in October 2020 until the inauguration of Dave Bronson in July 2021. Quinn-Davidson began serving on the Anchorage Assembly in 2018.

== Early life and education ==
Quinn-Davidson was born in Sacramento, California. She earned a Bachelor of Arts in environmental studies from the University of California, Santa Barbara in 2001 and a Juris Doctor from UC Davis School of Law in 2007.

== Career ==
Before serving as a member of the Assembly, Quinn-Davidson was a member of the Anchorage Budget Advisory and Women's Commissions. At the time of her election to the Assembly in 2018, Quinn-Davidson served as the Legal Affairs & Land Transactions Director at Great Land Trust, a non-profit organization based in Southcentral Alaska. While Assembly seats are nonpartisan, Quinn-Davidson has been referred to as a progressive.

=== Mayor of Anchorage ===
In October 2020, incumbent mayor Ethan Berkowitz announced that he had conducted an inappropriate texting relationship with a local television reporter. Berkowitz then resigned from office, effective October 23. Upon the announcement, the Anchorage Assembly was restructured. Quinn-Davidson, who had been serving as vice chair, was selected to serve as chair, placing her first in the mayoral line of succession. When Quinn-Davidson assumed office, she became the first woman and openly-gay person to serve as mayor of Anchorage. She chose not to run for election to a full term as mayor in 2021.

Political offices
Preceded by Ethan Berkowitz	Mayor of Anchorage; Acting; 2020–2021	Succeeded by Dave Bronson
