= 2024 Anchorage mayoral election =

- April 2, 2024 (first round); May 14, 2024 (runoff)
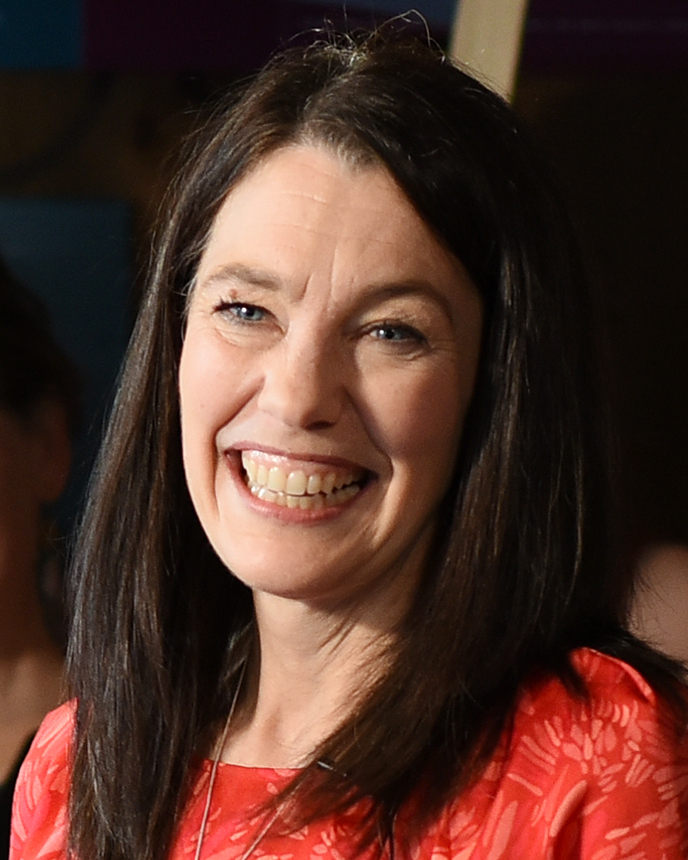

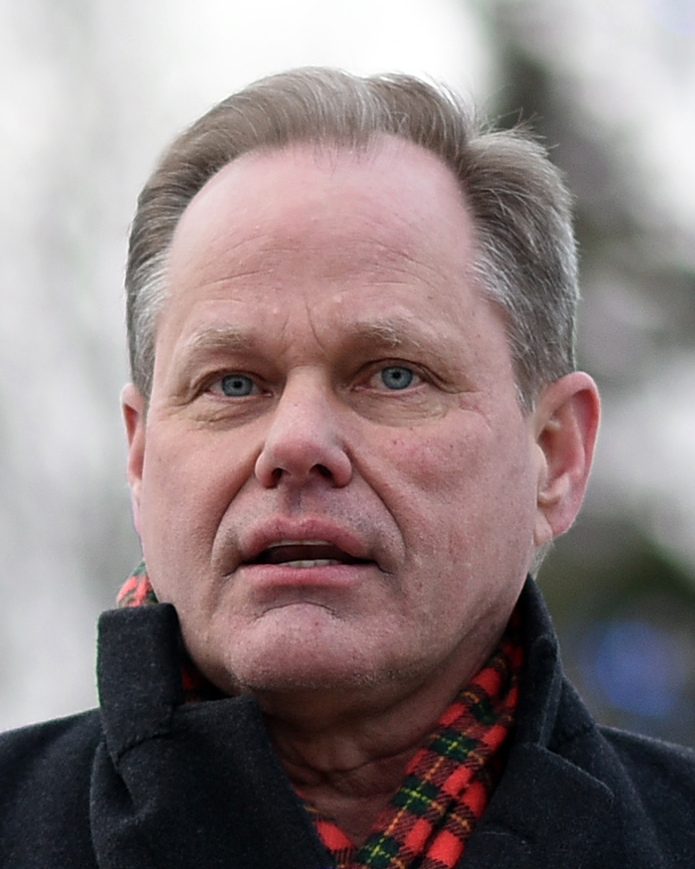

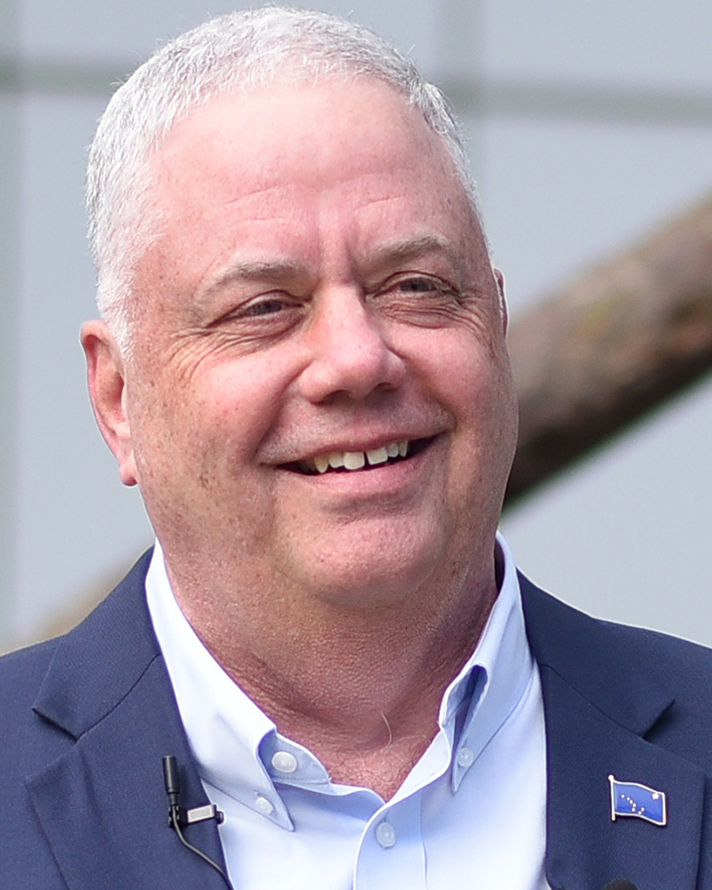

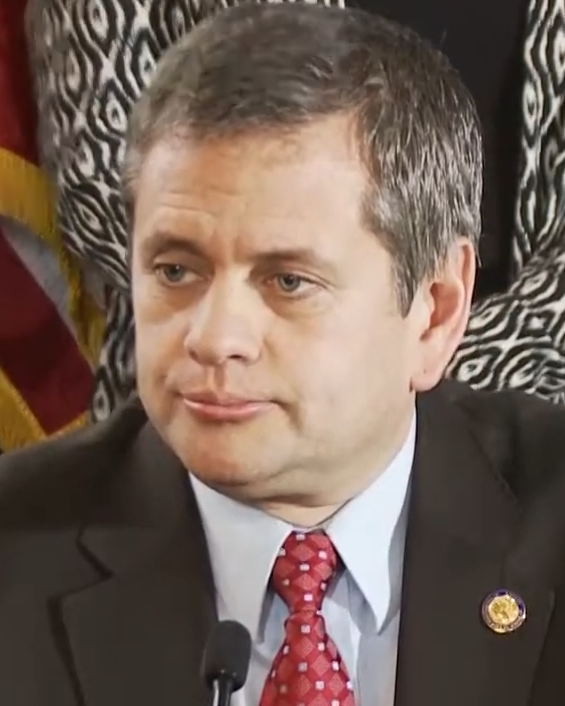
Candidate	Suzanne LaFrance	Dave Bronson
General election	25,904; 36.23%	25,431; 35.57%
Runoff	42,597; 53.54%	36,961; 46.46%
Candidate	Bill Popp	Chris Tuck
General election	11,968; 16.74%	5,650; 7.90%
Runoff	Eliminated	Eliminated

LaFrance
20–30%
30–40%
40–50%
50–60%
60–70%
70–80%
Bronson
30–40%
40–50%
50–60%
60–70%
Tie
30–40%
Mayor before election
Dave Bronson
Republican
Elected mayor
Suzanne LaFrance
Independent

The 2024 Anchorage mayoral election was held on April 2, 2024, with a runoff election on May 14 because no candidate received more than 45% of the vote in the first round. It elected the mayor of Anchorage, Alaska. Incumbent Republican mayor Dave Bronson ran for re-election to a second term in office.

Bronson and former Anchorage Assembly chair Suzanne LaFrance advanced to the runoff, with LaFrance narrowly placing ahead of Bronson. Bronson's general election vote total was the lowest for an incumbent Anchorage mayor since 2009. Candidates eliminated in the general election include nonprofit executive Bill Popp and former Alaska House Majority Leader Chris Tuck. Popp endorsed LaFrance in the runoff, while Tuck remained neutral.

LaFrance prevailed in the runoff, becoming the first woman elected mayor of Anchorage. Bronson is only the second mayor of Anchorage to lose re-election since it became a borough in 1975, the first being George Wuerch in 2003.

== Candidates ==
=== Advanced to runoff ===
- Dave Bronson, incumbent mayor (party affiliation: Republican)
- Suzanne LaFrance, former chair of the Anchorage Assembly (party affiliation: Independent)

=== Eliminated in general election ===
- Darin Colbry, truck driver and perennial candidate (party affiliation: Republican)
- Breck Craig, technology project manager, candidate for U.S. Senate in 2016, and candidate for U.S. House in 2022 (party affiliation: Independent)
- Nick Danger, former Girdwood supervisor, former WWF wrestler, and perennial candidate (party affiliation: Republican)
- Dustin Darden, maintenance worker and perennial candidate (party affiliation: Alaskan Independence)
- Jenny Di Grapa, food bank community relations director
- Phil Isley, aircraft mechanic and perennial candidate
- Bill Popp, nonprofit executive and former Kenai Peninsula Borough assemblyman (party affiliation: Independent) (endorsed LaFrance in runoff)
- Chris Tuck, former Majority Leader of the Alaska House of Representatives and former Anchorage school board member (party affiliation: Democratic) (declined to endorse in runoff)

== General election ==
=== Endorsements ===
Dave Bronson (R)

Federal officials

- Dan Sullivan, U.S. senator

Statewide officials

- Mike Dunleavy, governor of Alaska

State cabinet officials

- Kelly Tshibaka, former commissioner of the Alaska Department of Administration

Local officials

- Dan Sullivan, former mayor of Anchorage
Suzanne LaFrance (I)

State cabinet officials

- Heidi Drygas, former commissioner of the Alaska Department of Labor

State legislators

- Forrest Dunbar, state senator and runner-up for mayor in 2021 (Democratic)
- 8 state representatives

Local officials

- 7 Anchorage assemblymembers
- 3 Anchorage school board members

Labor unions

- AFL-CIO Anchorage Central Labor Council
- Alaska State Employees Association (AFSCME Local 52)
- Anchorage Fire Department Union (IAFF Local 1264)
- Anchorage Police Department Employees Association PAC (co-endorsement with Popp)

Organizations

- EMILY's List
- Planned Parenthood Action

Political parties

- Alaska Democratic Party (co-endorsement with Tuck)
- Anchorage Democrats (co-endorsement with Tuck)
Bill Popp (I)

Labor unions

- Anchorage Police Department Employees Association PAC (co-endorsement with LaFrance)
Chris Tuck (D)

State legislators

- Tom Begich, former Minority Leader of the Alaska Senate
- Les Gara, former state representative
- Berta Gardner, former state senator
- Elvi Gray-Jackson, state senator
- Cliff Groh, state representative (co-endorsement with LaFrance)
- Andy Josephson, state representative
- Löki Tobin, state senator
- Bill Wielechowski, state senator

Local officials

- Pat Higgins, Anchorage school board member

Political parties

- Alaska Democratic Party (co-endorsement with LaFrance)
- Anchorage Democrats (co-endorsement with LaFrance)
Declined to endorse

Federal officials

- Lisa Murkowski, U.S. senator (Republican)

=== Polling ===
Poll source	Date(s) administered	Sample size (Note: Key: A – all adults RV – registered voters LV – likely voters V – unclear)	Margin of error	Dave Bronson	Suzanne LaFrance	Bill Popp	Chris Tuck	Other	Undecided
Alaska Survey Research	July 24–28, 2023	555 (LV)	± 4.2%	33%	20%	8%	13%	9% (Note: Bill Falsey with 9%)	16%

=== Debates ===
2024 Anchorage mayoral election debates
No.	Date	Host	Moderator	Link	Nonpartisan	Nonpartisan	Nonpartisan	Nonpartisan
Key: P Participant A Absent N Not invited I Invited W Withdrawn								
Key: P Participant A Absent N Not invited I Invited W Withdrawn					Dave Bronson	Suzanne LaFrance	Bill Popp	Chris Tuck
1	Mar. 13, 2024	Alaska's News Source	Mike Ross	YouTube	P	P	P	P
2	Mar. 16, 2024	The Alaska Landmine	Jeff Landfield	YouTube	P	P	P	P
3	Mar. 21, 2024	Alaska Public Media; Anchorage Daily News	Tom Hewitt; Lori Townsend	YouTube	P	P	P	P

=== Results ===
2024 Anchorage mayoral general election
Candidate	Votes	%
Suzanne LaFrance	25,904	36.23
Dave Bronson (incumbent)	25,431	35.57
Bill Popp	11,968	16.74
Chris Tuck	5,650	7.90
Jenny Di Grapa	1,435	2.01
Nick Danger	326	0.46
Phil Isley	311	0.43
Dustin Darden	229	0.32
Breck Craig	154	0.22
Darin Colbry	88	0.12
Write-in	155	0.22
Total votes	71,496	100

== Runoff ==
=== Debates ===
2024 Anchorage mayoral election runoff debates
No.	Date	Host	Moderator	Link	Nonpartisan	Nonpartisan
Key: P Participant A Absent N Not invited I Invited W Withdrawn						
Key: P Participant A Absent N Not invited I Invited W Withdrawn					Dave Bronson	Suzanne LaFrance
1	May 2, 2024	Alaska Public Media	Tom Hewitt; Lori Townsend	YouTube	P	P
2	May 3, 2024	Alaska Public Media	Rebecca Palsha	YouTube	P	P

=== Results ===
2024 Anchorage mayoral runoff
Candidate	Votes	%
Suzanne LaFrance	42,597	53.54
Dave Bronson (incumbent)	36,961	46.46
Total votes	79,558	100.00
