= Beth Kerttula =

American politician

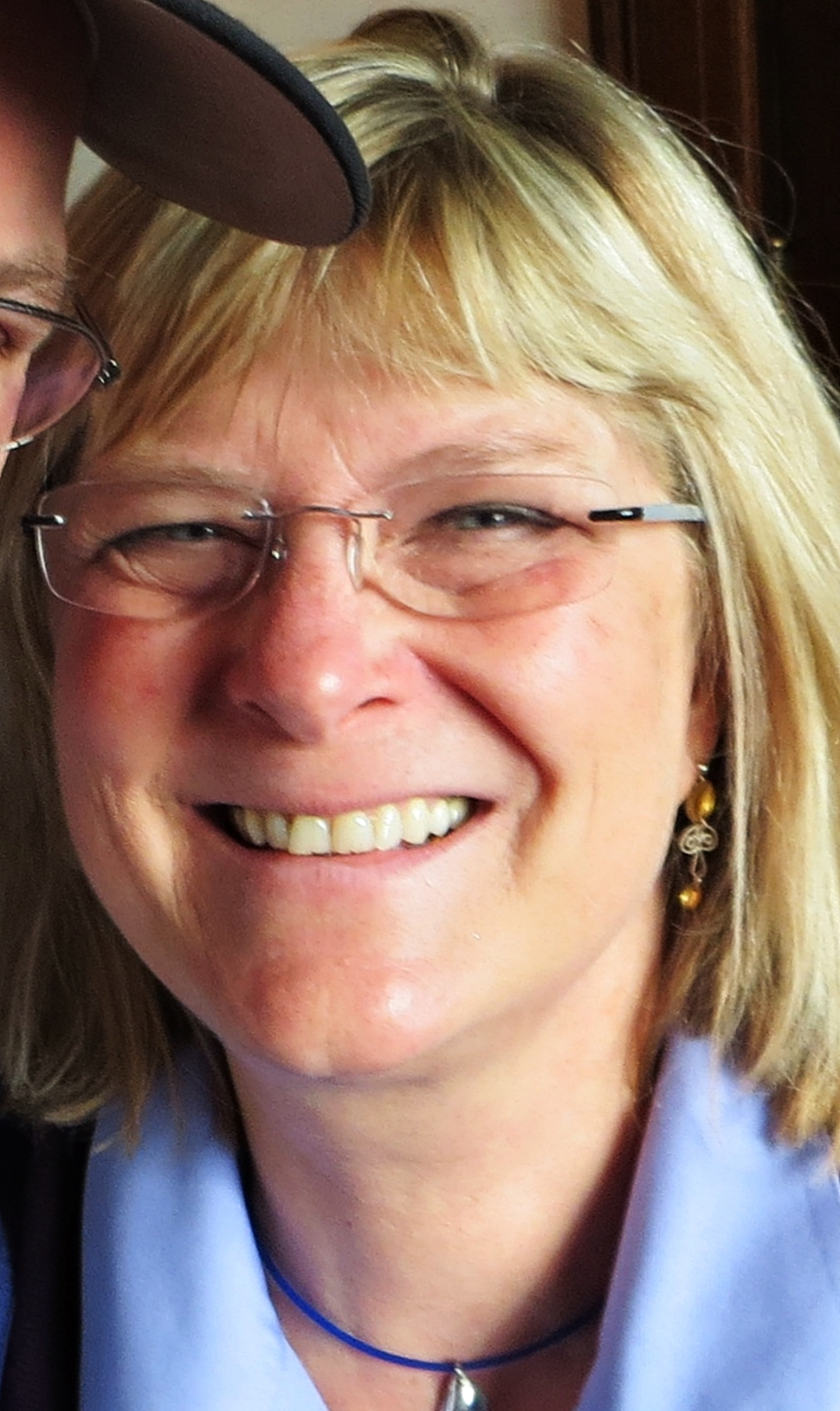

Minority Leader of the Alaska House of Representatives
- In office January 15, 2007 – January 21, 2014
- Preceded by: Ethan Berkowitz
- Succeeded by: Chris Tuck

Member of the Alaska House of Representatives from the 3rd district
- In office January 19, 1999 – January 24, 2014
- Preceded by: Kim Elton
- Succeeded by: Sam Kito III

Personal details
- Born: January 8, 1956 (age 70) Guthrie, Oklahoma, U.S.
- Party: Democratic
- Spouse: Jim Powell
- Education: Stanford University; Santa Clara University School of Law
- Profession: Attorney

Elizabeth J. Kerttula (born January 8, 1956) is a Democratic former member of the Alaska House of Representatives, representing the 3rd District from 1998 to her resignation at the start of the legislative session in 2014. Sam Kito III was appointed to serve the remainder of her term. She served as the House Minority Leader from 2006 until her resignation, when she was succeeded by Chris Tuck. She resigned on the first day of the 2014 legislative session to accept a fellowship at the Center for Ocean Solutions at Stanford University, her alma mater. She was appointed as Director of the National Oceans Council, under President Barack Obama, on June 5, 2014. She was the daughter of Joyce and state senator Jalmar M. Kerttula. Her father represented the Matanuska-Susitna Valley (and at one point, also the Copper River valley and Valdez) in the Alaska legislature for most of the period between 1961 and 1995 and served as the Senate President.
