= 2015 Anchorage mayoral election =

- April 7, 2015 (first round); May 5, 2015 (runoff)
- Turnout: 27.0% (first round); 32.6% (runoff)
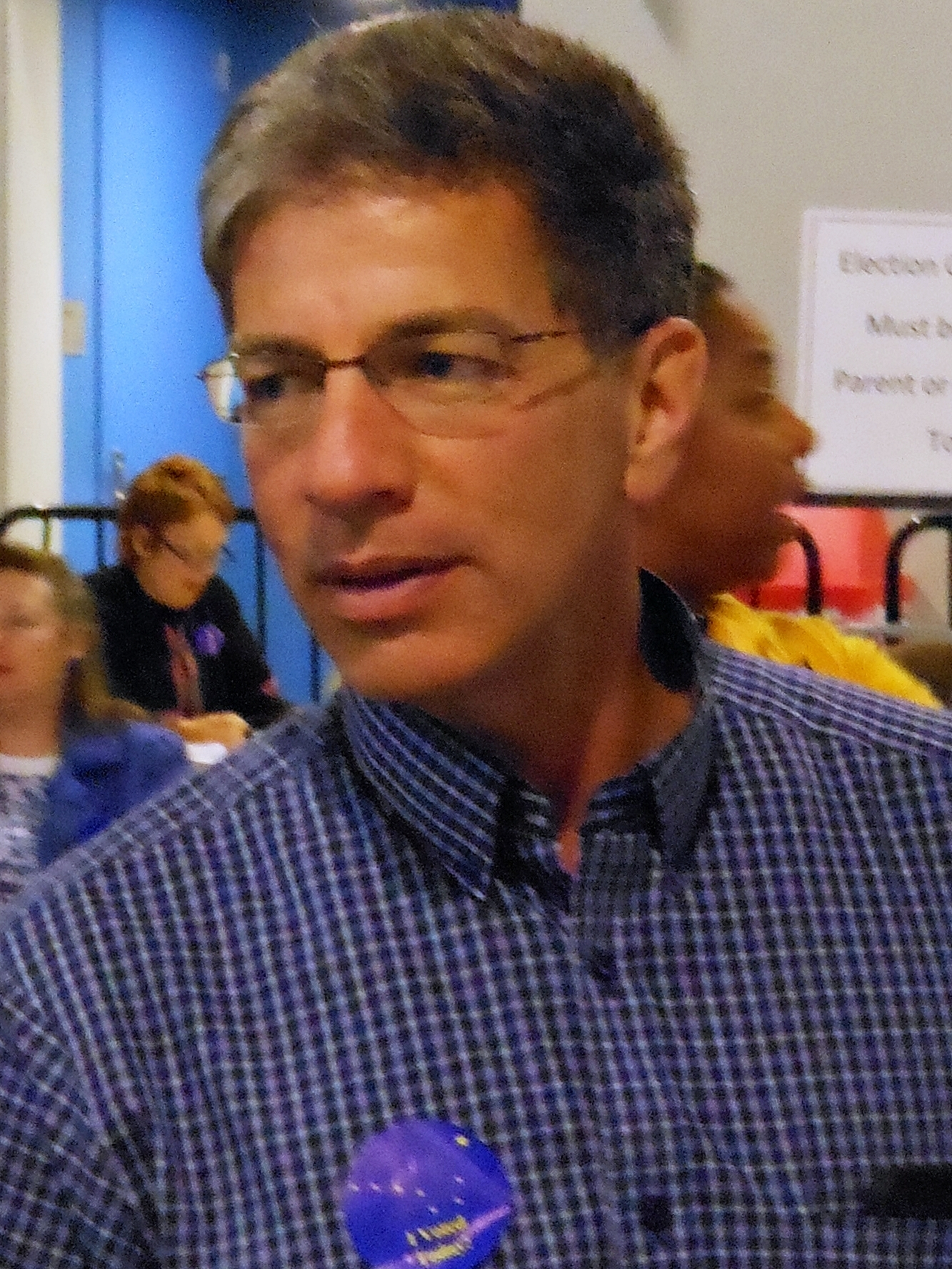

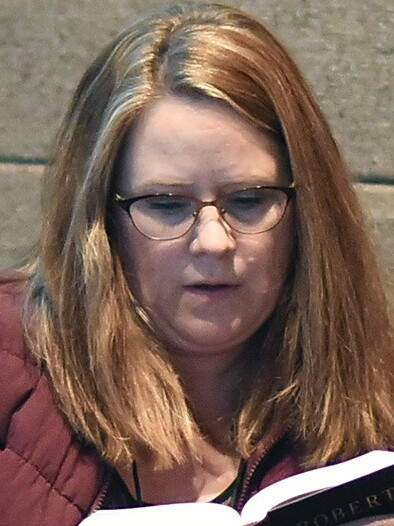

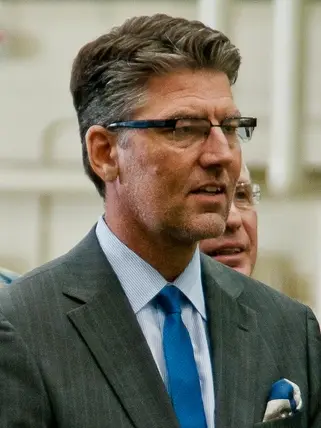
Candidate	Ethan Berkowitz	Amy Demboski
First round	20,451; 37.01%	13,337; 24.13%
Second round	40,826; 60.62%	26,519; 39.38%
Candidate	Andrew Halcro	Dan Coffey
First round	11,956; 21.64%	7,960; 14.40%
Second round	Eliminated	Eliminated
Runoff results by precinct:
Berkowitz:
50–60%
60–70%
70–80%
80–90%
Demboski:
50–60%
60–70%
Mayor before election
Dan Sullivan
Republican
Elected mayor
Ethan Berkowitz
Democratic

The 2015 Anchorage mayoral election was held on April 7 and May 5, 2015, to elect the mayor of Anchorage, Alaska. It saw election of Ethan Berkowitz.

Since no candidate obtained a 45% plurality in the first round, a runoff was held between the top-two finishers.

== Results ==
=== First round ===
First round results
Party	Candidate	Votes	%
Nonpartisan	Ethan Berkowitz	20,451	37.01
Nonpartisan	Amy Demboski	13,337	24.13
Nonpartisan	Andrew Halcro	11,956	21.64
Nonpartisan	Dan Coffey	7,960	14.40
Nonpartisan	Dustin Darden	571	1.03
Nonpartisan	Lance Ahern	395	0.71
Nonpartisan	Paul Bauer	217	0.39
Nonpartisan	Timothy Huit	120	0.22
Nonpartisan	Jacob Seth Kern	57	0.10
Nonpartisan	Christopher Jamison	45	0.08
Nonpartisan	Samuel Joe Speziale	31	0.06
Write-in	Write-ins	120	0.22
Turnout		55,260	27.0

=== Runoff ===
Runoff results
Party	Candidate	Votes	%
Nonpartisan	Ethan Berkowitz	40,826	60.62
Nonpartisan	Amy Demboski	26,519	39.38
Turnout		67,345	32.6
