= 2006 Alaska gubernatorial election =

- November 7, 2006
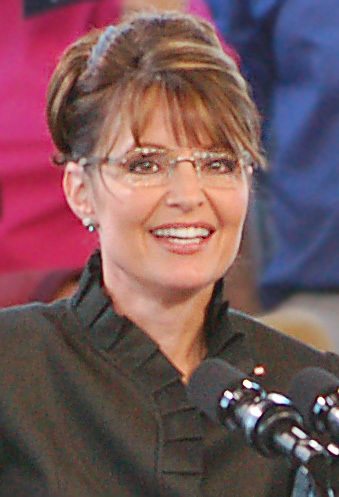

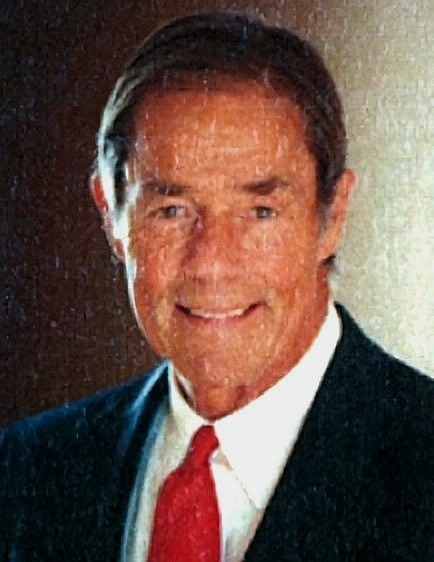

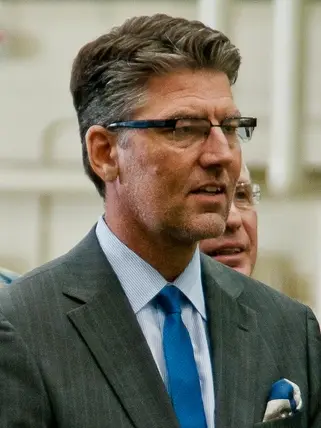
Nominee	Sarah Palin	Tony Knowles	Andrew Halcro
Party	Republican	Democratic	Independent
Running mate	Sean Parnell	Ethan Berkowitz	Fay Von Gemmingen
Popular vote	114,697	97,238	22,443
Percentage	48.33%	40.97%	9.46%
- Borough and census area results Palin: 40–50% 50–60% 60–70% Knowles: 40–50% 50–60% 60–70% 70–80% 80–90%
Governor before election
Frank Murkowski
Republican
Elected Governor
Sarah Palin
Republican

The 2006 Alaska gubernatorial general election took place on November 7, 2006. Former Wasilla mayor Sarah Palin defeated incumbent governor Frank Murkowski in the Republican primary, and then went on to defeat Democratic former governor Tony Knowles and independent Andrew Halcro in the general election. Palin became the first governor of the state to be born after Alaskan statehood.

Palin would later become the unsuccessful Republican vice presidential nominee in the 2008 United States presidential election before resigning as governor in 2009.

== Republican primary ==
=== Candidates ===
- John Binkley, Fairbanks businessman and former State Senator from Bethel
- Gerald Heikes, minister at Anchorage's nondenominational Bethel Chapel and perennial candidate
- Merica Hlatcu
- Frank Murkowski, incumbent Governor since 2003
- Sarah Palin, former mayor of Wasilla (1996–2003) and chair of the Alaska Oil and Gas Conservation Commission (2003–04)

Incumbent Frank Murkowski, first elected governor in 2002, ran for reelection but was defeated in a landslide in the Republican primary by former Wasilla mayor Sarah Palin on August 22, 2006. Murkowski's approval rating at the time of the election was 19%.

=== Results ===
Republican primary results by state house district Palin: 40–50%; 50–60%; 60–70%; 70–80%; Binkley: 30–40%; 40–50%; 60–70%; Murkowski: 40–50%

2006 Republican primary for Alaska governor
Party	Candidate	Votes	%
Republican	Sarah Palin	51,443	50.59
Republican	John Binkley	30,349	29.84
Republican	Frank Murkowski (incumbent)	19,412	19.09
Republican	Gerald Heikes	280	0.28
Republican	Merica Hlatcu	211	0.21
Total votes		101,695	100.00

== Democratic primary ==
=== Candidates ===
- Eric Croft, State Representative from Spenard, Anchorage
- Tony Knowles, former Governor of Alaska (1994–2002)
- Bruce Lemke

Former two-term Governor Tony Knowles and state lawmaker Eric Croft competed for the Democratic ticket for governor. Knowles had a substantial lead over Croft, both at the polls and with fundraising.

=== Results ===
2006 Democratic primary for Alaska governor
Party	Candidate	Votes	%
Democratic	Tony Knowles	37,316	74.63
Democratic	Eric Croft	11,952	23.90
Democratic	Bruce Lemke	732	1.46
Total votes		50,000	100.00

== General election ==
=== Candidates ===
- Andrew Halcro, president and CEO of Avis Alaska and former State Representative from Anchorage (Independent)
- Tony Knowles, former Governor of Alaska (1995–2003) (Democratic)
- David Massie (Green)
- Sarah Palin, former mayor of Wasilla (1996–2003) and chair of the Alaska Oil and Gas Conservation Commission (2003–04) (Republican)
- Billy Toien, candidate for governor in 2002 (Libertarian)
- Don Wright, bush pilot and perennial candidate (Alaska Independence)

=== Predictions ===
Source	Ranking	As of
The Cook Political Report	Tossup	November 6, 2006
Sabato's Crystal Ball	Lean R	November 6, 2006
Rothenberg Political Report	Lean R	November 2, 2006
Real Clear Politics	Lean R	November 6, 2006

=== Polling ===
Poll source	Date(s) administered	Sarah Palin (R)	Tony Knowles (D)
Rasmussen	November 3, 2006	45%	44%
Rasmussen	October 9, 2006	47%	40%
Rasmussen	September 8, 2006	52%	38%
Rasmussen	August 3, 2006	51%	38%
Ivan Moore Research	June 7, 2006	39%	43%

=== Results ===
2006 Alaska gubernatorial election
Party	Candidate	Votes	%	±%
Republican	Sarah Palin	114,697	48.33%	−7.6%
Democratic	Tony Knowles	97,238	40.97%	+0.3%
Independent	Andrew Halcro	22,443	9.46%	n/a
Independence	Don Wright	1,285	0.54%	−0.4%
Libertarian	Billy Toien	682	0.29%	−0.2%
Green	David Massie	593	0.25%	−1.0%
Write-in		384	0.16%	+0.1%
Plurality		17,459	7.36%	
Turnout		238,307	51.1%	
Republican hold		Swing	−7.6%	

== See also ==
- 2006 United States gubernatorial elections
