= 2024 Will County Executive election =

- November 5, 2024

Nominee	Jennifer Bertino-Tarrant	Chuck Maher
Party	Democratic	Republican
Popular vote	162,733	152,817
Percentage	51.57%	48.43%
- Results: Bertino-Tarrant: 50–60% 60–70% 70–80% 80–90% >90% Maher: 50–60% 60–70% 70–80%
County Executive before election
Jennifer Bertino-Tarrant
Democratic
Elected County Executive
Jennifer Bertino-Tarrant
Democratic

The 2024 Will County Executive election was held on November 5, 2024. Incumbent Democratic County Executive Jennifer Bertino-Tarrant ran for re-election to a second term. She was challenged by former County Board Member Chuck Maher, the Republican nominee. Bertino-Tarrant campaigned her success in her first term, pointing to her work in "building good, trusting relationships with local entities as well as departments within the county offices." Maher, who left office in 2019, said that he re-entered politics to challenge Bertino-Tarrant because of a need to cut spending and taxes, and argued that Bertino-Tarrant fostered a poor relationship with the County Board.

Bertino-Tarrant ultimately won re-election, but by a reduced margin, winning 52 percent of the vote to Maher's 48 percent.

== Democratic primary ==
=== Candidates ===
- Jennifer Bertino-Tarrant, incumbent County Executive

=== Primary results ===
Democratic primary results
Party	Candidate	Votes	%
Democratic	Jennifer Bertino-Tarrant	31,588	100.00%
Total votes		31,588	100.00%

== Republican primary ==
=== Candidates ===
- Chuck Maher, former County Board Member

=== Primary results ===
Republican primary results
Party	Candidate	Votes	%
Republican	Chuck Maher	28,829	100.00%
Total votes		28,829	100.00%

== General election ==
=== Results ===
2024 Will County Executive election
Party	Candidate	Votes	%
Democratic	Jennifer Bertino-Tarrant (inc.)	162,733	51.57%
Republican	Chuck Maher	152,817	48.43%
Total votes		315,550	100.00%
Democratic hold			
