= Dave Bronson =

American politician (born 1958)

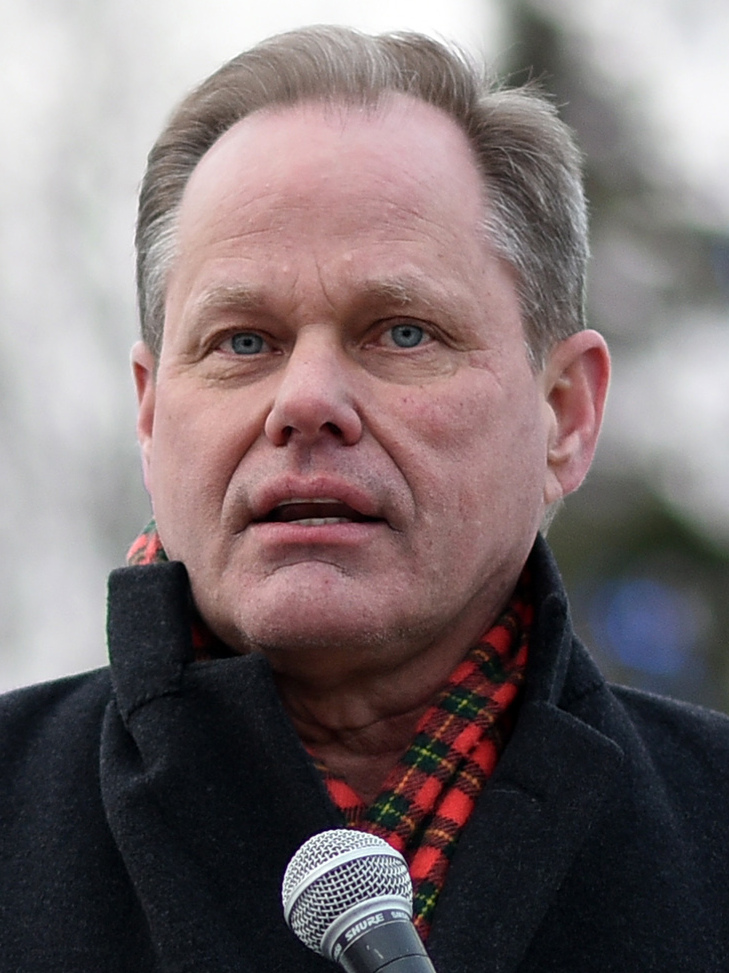
- Bronson in 2022

37th Mayor of Anchorage
- In office July 1, 2021 – July 1, 2024
- Preceded by: Austin Quinn-Davidson (acting)
- Succeeded by: Suzanne LaFrance

Personal details
- Born: June 26, 1958 (age 68) Superior, Wisconsin, U.S.
- Party: Republican
- Spouse: Debra
- Children: 2
- Education: University of Wisconsin, Madison (BS)
- Website: Campaign website

Military service
- Allegiance: United States
- Branch/service: United States Air Force
- Unit: Air Force Reserve Command; Alaska Air National Guard

David Bronson (born June 26, 1958) is an American politician, pilot, and retired National Guard (Air Force) officer. A Republican, he was the 37th mayor of Anchorage, Alaska, from 2021 until 2024. Bronson was a candidate in the 2026 Alaska gubernatorial election.

== Early life and education ==
Bronson was born and raised in the southern end of Superior, Wisconsin. He was born to parents Bill and Sandy Bronson. He attended Superior High School. As a young boy, Bronson distributed the Evening Telegram newspaper. He earned a Bachelor of Science degree in agricultural economics from the University of Wisconsin–Madison.

== Career ==
After graduating, Bronson was involved in the creation of the Alaska Family Council, a nonprofit organization that promotes traditional Christian values and is against same-sex marriage and abortion. In 2011, Bronson ran for a Midtown Assembly seat and lost. During the assembly, Bronson was asked about certain policies including collective bargaining and tax burdens. Bronson served as a pilot in the United States Air Force from 1981 to 1990, as an Air Force Reserve Command plans officer from 1992 to 1993, and an Alaska Air National Guard maintenance officer and pilot from 1993 to 2005, retiring with the rank of lieutenant colonel. He has also worked as a commercial pilot since 1990. In January 2021, Bronson declared his candidacy for mayor in the 2021 Anchorage mayoral election. In the general election, Bronson placed first in a field of 15 candidates. Bronson then narrowly defeated Forrest Dunbar in a May 2021 runoff election. Dunbar conceded the race to Bronson on May 21, 2021. Though Anchorage mayoral elections are nonpartisan, Bronson is a registered Republican.

=== Mayor of Anchorage ===
Anchorage has mayor council leadership that gives the mayor power similar to that of a chief executive. In other words, Anchorage has a strong mayoral system. In this system, the mayor has veto power as well as the power to propose the annual fiscal budget. However, even though the mayor has the power to propose the budget, the Assembly has the ultimate power to approve or reject proposed changes to the budget. The mayor is also responsible for appointing a municipal manager who is responsible for everyday operations. But, prior to being appointed, the municipal manager must undergo a confirmation process by the city Assembly.

In October 2023 Bronson proposed a revised operating budget for the city in 2024. Currently, the city of Anchorage spends roughly $600 million annually. Bronson's proposed budget would cut current spending by about $2.4 million. Despite these proposed changes, Bronson has continued to emphasize the importance of core public services such as: increased funding for public transportation, snow removal and road maintenance and repairs. In addition, Bronson emphasized the importance of funding necessary public health and safety services in an attempt to prioritize the needs of Anchorage residents.

The month after Bronson took office, he revoked a paid parental leave policy for city workers. Another policy was revoked that allowed non-unionized city workers to bring their young children (up to six months old) to the office. Both policies were enacted by the previous mayor Austin Quinn-Davidson late into her term. Bronson cited the lack of research on the policies prior to implementation and their rushed nature of approval as reason for their dismissal. He also said that he received complaints from workers about children brought to work.

During the COVID-19 pandemic, Bronson declined to enact mask or vaccine requirements, saying that it was a matter of personal choice. He also said he would not get a vaccine, calling it "experimental". During an Anchorage Assembly meeting on September 29, 2021, he defended the use of Star of David holocaust imagery worn by those opposed to a municipal mask mandate. The mandatory mask ordinance–requiring any individual older than two years old to wear a facial mask indoors–was debated at the meeting. Bronson initially advocated for the symbol's usage, calling it a "credit to [Jews]," but later recanted the statement after public criticism. He went on to say that although he agreed with opposing the mask ordinance, that protestors should choose a different symbol to do so.

In May 2023, Bronson closed the homeless shelter at the Sullivan Arena leading the homeless encampments in Anchorage parks to "explode in size." Bronson said that the Arena should go back to hosting concerts and hockey games, and suggested sending the homeless people to Los Angeles and other cities in the contiguous United States. Bronson had made plans to construct a new shelter for up to 200 people, but the Anchorage Assembly shut down the project. Construction had begun without finalizing funding and without a plan for its operating costs going forward.

==== Mayoral elections ====
In the 2021 Anchorage mayoral election, Bronson and Forrest Dunbar advanced to a runoff election on May 11 after no one gained a majority in the general election on April 5. Dunbar conceded on May 21. Bronson received 50.66% of the vote, while Dunbar received 49.34%.

Bronson lost the 2024 Anchorage mayoral election in the May 14 runoff against Suzanne LaFrance.

=== 2026 gubernatorial campaign ===
On October 2, 2025, Bronson announced his candidacy in the 2026 Alaska gubernatorial election. He received 8.1% of the vote in the nonpartisan primary on August 18, 2026, placing fourth and advancing to the general election.

== Personal life ==
Bronson and his wife, Debra, attend Mountain City Church (formerly Anchorage Baptist Temple). During the COVID-19 pandemic, Bronson accepted an early retirement package from Delta Air Lines, where he had been a commercial pilot. Bronson has two children. His son, Zach, is a commercial pilot. Bronson is a hunter and fisherman. In 2025, he was appointed airport manager of Anchorage Airport.

Political offices
Preceded by Austin Quinn-Davidson; Acting	Mayor of Anchorage; 2021–2024	Succeeded by Suzanne LaFrance
