= 2018 Anchorage mayoral election =

- April 3, 2018
- Turnout: 35.22%
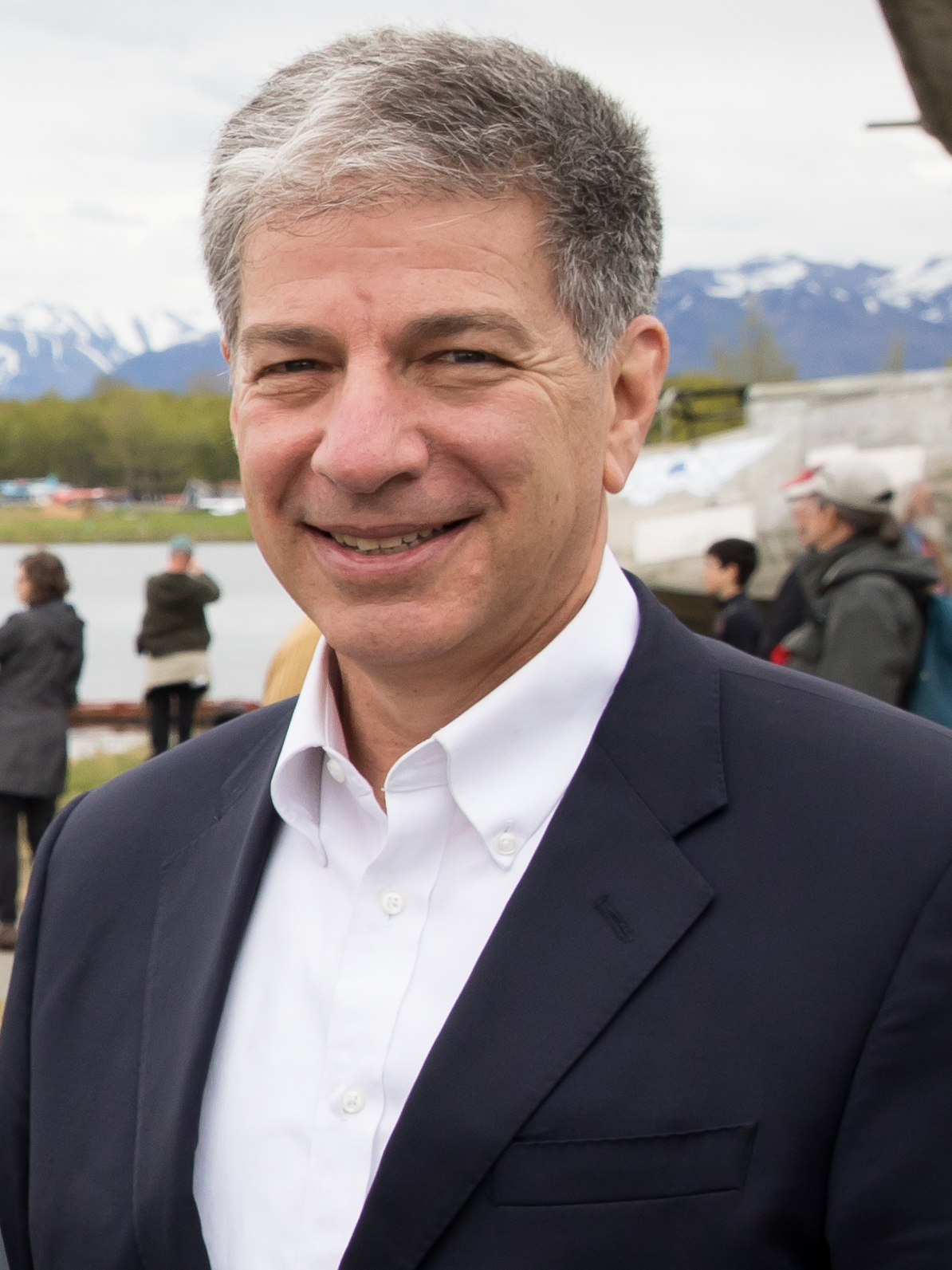

Candidate	Ethan Berkowitz	Rebecca Logan
Popular vote	42,639	28,560
Percentage	55.44%	37.14%
Results by precinct:
Berkowitz:
40–50%
50–60%
60–70%
70–80%
80–90%
Logan:
40–50%
50–60%
Mayor before election
Ethan Berkowitz
Democratic
Elected mayor
Ethan Berkowitz
Democratic

The 2018 Anchorage mayoral election was held on April 3, 2018, to elect the mayor of Anchorage, Alaska. It saw reelection of incumbent mayor Ethan Berkowitz.

Since Berkowitz obtained 55% in the initial round, more than the 45% plurality required, no runoff was necessitated.

== Results ==
Results
Party	Candidate	Votes	%
Nonpartisan	Ethan Berkowitz (incumbent)	42,639	55.44
Nonpartisan	Rebecca Logan	28,560	37.14
Nonpartisan	Dustin Darden	1,502	1.95
Nonpartisan	Paul Kendall	1,171	1.52
Nonpartisan	Timothy R. Huit	897	1.17
Nonpartisan	Ron Stafford	468	0.61
Nonpartisan	Nelson Godoy	446	0.58
Nonpartisan	Matthew Mendonsa	408	0.53
Turnout		76,906	35.22
