= 2024 Orange County, California elections =

There were multiple elections that took place in Orange County, California during 2024:

- 2024 Orange County Board of Supervisors election
- 2024 Irvine mayoral election
- Municipal elections in Costa Mesa
