= Suzanne LaFrance =

American politician (born 1968)

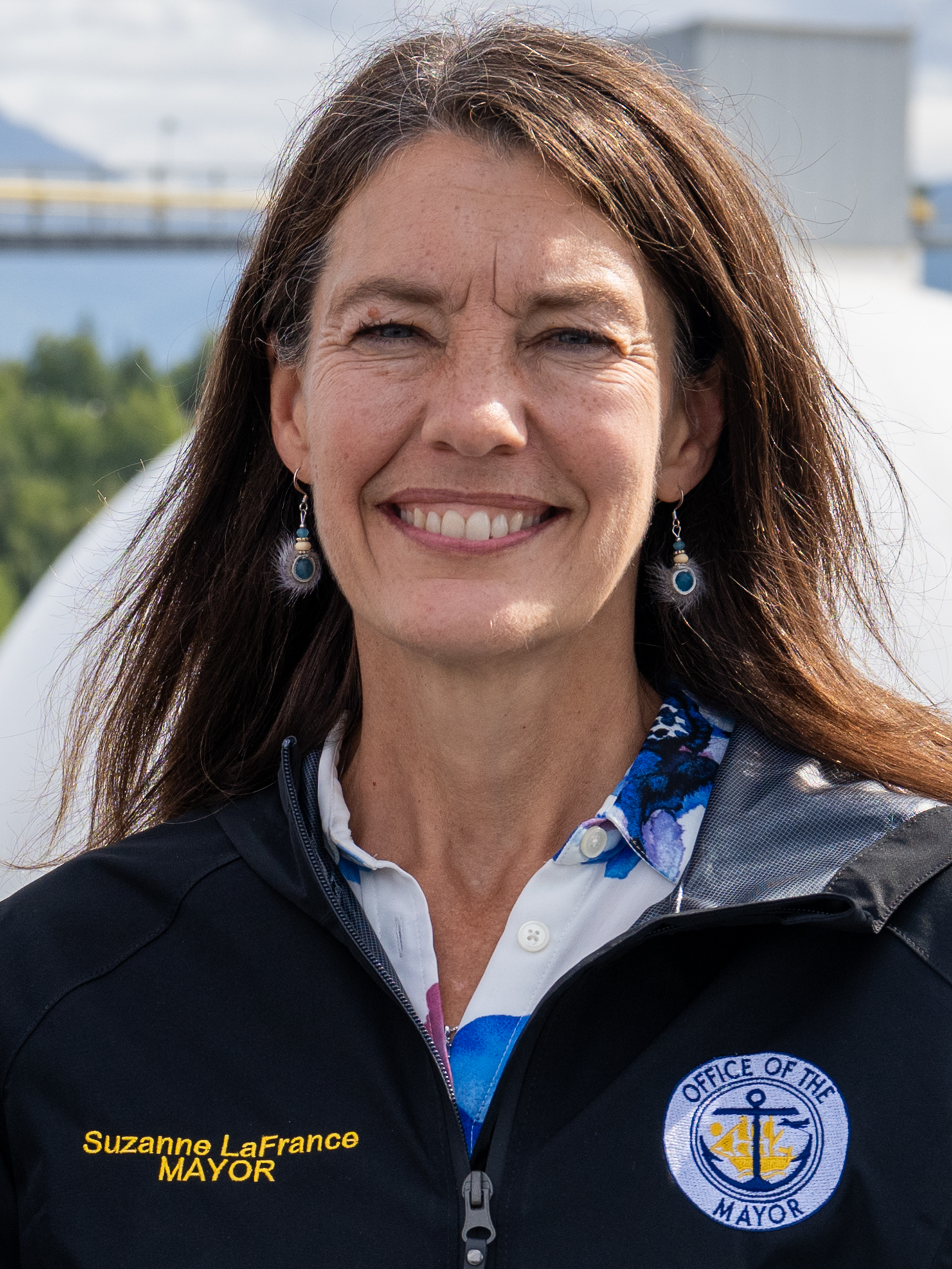
- LaFrance in 2025

38th Mayor of Anchorage
- Incumbent
- Assumed office July 1, 2024
- Preceded by: Dave Bronson

Member of the Anchorage Assembly for District 6, Seat K
- In office 2017–2023
- Preceded by: Bill Evans
- Succeeded by: Zac Johnson

Personal details
- Born: 1968 or 1969 (age 57–58) Manchester, New Hampshire, U.S.
- Party: Independent
- Education: University of Portland (BA); Purdue University (MA)

Suzanne M. LaFrance (born 1968 or 1969) is an American politician serving as the 38th mayor of Anchorage. She unseated incumbent mayor Dave Bronson in the 2024 election. She is an independent.

== Early life and education ==
LaFrance was born in Manchester, New Hampshire, and moved to Alaska when she was a child, eventually settling in Palmer. She earned a Bachelor of Arts degree from the University of Portland and a Master of Arts from Purdue University.

== Career ==
Prior to entering politics, LaFrance worked in business as a financial analyst and project manager.

LaFrance served on the Anchorage Assembly from 2017 to 2023. In 2020, she ran as an independent for the 28th district of the Alaska House of Representatives, centered in South Anchorage, against Republican James D. Kaufman. She received the support of the Democratic Party. She ultimately lost the election, receiving 5,416 votes to Kaufman’s 5,851.

=== Mayor of Anchorage ===
==== 2024 election ====
In 2024, LaFrance ran for mayor of Anchorage against Republican Dave Bronson, the incumbent mayor. Running as an independent, she received a co-endorsement from the Anchorage Democratic Party. LaFrance ultimately defeated Bronson, taking 53.54% of the vote to Bronson's 46.46%.

==== Tenure ====
She was sworn into office on July 1, 2024. In October 2024, she endorsed three candidates running for the Alaska House of Representatives: Republican Chuck Kopp (10th district), Democrat Ted Eischeid (22nd district), and independent Ky Holland (9th district).

Political offices
Preceded by Dave Bronson	Mayor of Anchorage; 2024–present	Incumbent
