= Ethan Berkowitz =

American politician

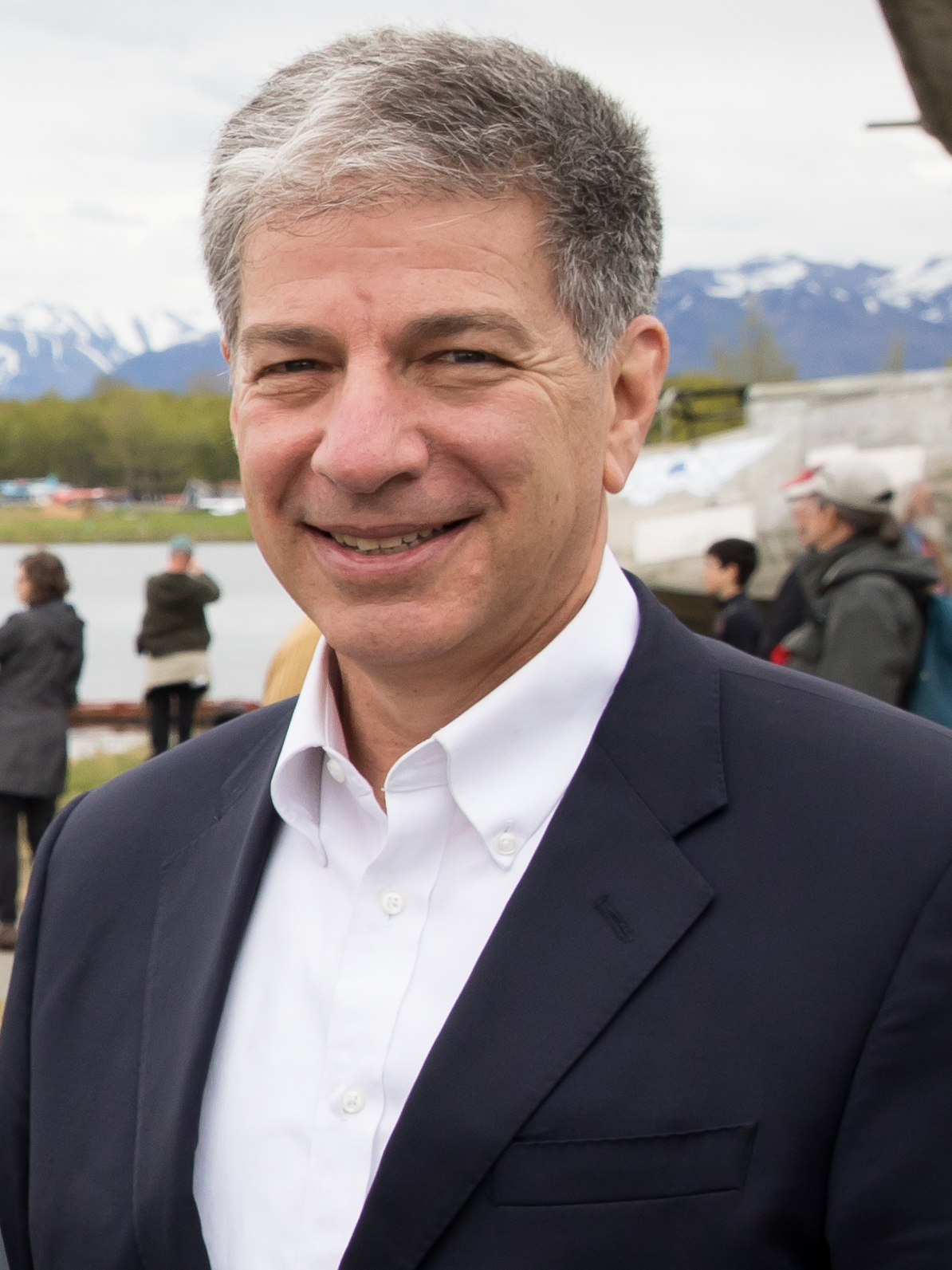
- Berkowitz, May 2018

Mayor of Anchorage
- In office July 1, 2015 – October 23, 2020
- Preceded by: Dan Sullivan
- Succeeded by: Austin Quinn-Davidson (acting)

Minority Leader of the Alaska House of Representatives
- In office 1999–2006
- Preceded by: Gene Kubina
- Succeeded by: Beth Kerttula

Member of the Alaska House of Representatives
- In office 1997–2007
- Preceded by: Cynthia Toohey
- Succeeded by: Lindsey Holmes
- Constituency: 26th district (2003–2007); 13th district (1997–2003)

Personal details
- Born: Ethan Avram Berkowitz; February 4, 1962 (age 64) San Francisco, California, U.S.
- Party: Democratic
- Spouse: Mara Kimmel
- Children: 2
- Education: Harvard University (AB); University of Cambridge (MPhil); University of California, Hastings (JD)

Ethan Avram Berkowitz (born February 4, 1962) is an American attorney, businessman, and politician from Alaska. From 1997 to 2007 he was the Alaska State Representative for District 26, serving as the Democratic Party minority leader from 1999 to 2007. He was the Democratic nominee for lieutenant governor in 2006, for Alaska's at-large congressional district in 2008, and for governor in 2010. He was elected mayor of Anchorage in 2015, and reelected in 2018. Berkowitz resigned as mayor of Anchorage in October 2020 after admitting to being in a "consensual, inappropriate messaging relationship" with a reporter.

== Early life and education ==
Berkowitz was born to a Jewish family in San Francisco. He earned a Bachelor of Arts degree in government and economics from Harvard College in 1983, a MPhil in polar studies from the University of Cambridge in 1986, and a Juris Doctor from the Hastings College of Law in San Francisco, in 1990.

He moved to Alaska after graduating from law school and has worked as an attorney and business owner.

== Political career ==
=== Alaska House of Representatives ===
Berkowitz was the Democratic minority leader in the Alaska House of Representatives from 1999 to 2007. He was first elected to represent District 26 (Anchorage) in 1996 and reelected in 1998, 2000, 2002, and 2004.

=== 2006 campaign ===
In the 2006 election Berkowitz was the Democratic nominee for lieutenant governor of Alaska, running with gubernatorial nominee Tony Knowles. Knowles and Berkowitz were defeated in the general election by Sarah Palin and Sean Parnell, 48% to 41%.

=== 2008 campaign ===
In 2008 Berkowitz ran for election as U.S. Representative for Alaska's at-large congressional district, held by scandal-plagued Republican Don Young, who was seeking his 19th term in Congress. Berkowitz defeated Diane Benson in the August 26 Democratic primary by a substantial margin.

The initial results from the general election on November 4, 2008, showed Young leading the race, but with many absentee and provisional ballots left to be counted, the race was not called. On November 12 it was reported that Young had been reelected. Berkowitz conceded defeat on November 18, after counting of absentee and provisional ballots had mostly been completed and Young had a clearly insurmountable lead. Ultimately Young received 50% of the vote to Berkowitz's 45%. Berkowitz received more votes in 2008 (142,560) than any Democrat who had ever run against Young for Congress, and came the closest any Democrat had to unseating Young since 1990, when John Devens of Valdez received 48% of the vote.

=== 2010 campaign ===
In December 2008 Berkowitz said he was considering challenging Young again in 2010, but in July 2009 he said he would not run and was instead considering challenging Governor Sarah Palin. Berkowitz entered the race following Palin's resignation in July 2009 and on August 24, 2010, he defeated State Senator Hollis S. French for the Democratic nomination. Incumbent Republican Governor Sean Parnell defeated Berkowitz and his running mate Diane E. Benson in the November general election, 59% to 38%.

=== 2015 mayoral campaign ===
Berkowitz ran for mayor of Anchorage in 2015. He finished ahead of the rest of the field in the nonpartisan primary on April 7, advancing to a runoff with Assemblywoman Amy Demboski. Endorsed by the third-place finisher, former Republican state representative Andrew Halcro, he won the May 5 runoff election by a 19-point margin.

Comments Berkowitz had made on the Bernadette and Berkowitz Show attracted controversy. In the context of a debate on October 13, 2014, with co-host Bernadette Wilson over same-sex marriage, Berkowitz had said, "I support the idea of adults being able to choose who they have a relationship with. Father and son should be allowed to marry, if they’re both consenting adults—if you’re defining marriage as the bundle of rights and privileges that’s now accrued to people, then yes." Berkowitz later called the remark a "hypothetical insinuation", denying that he supports incest.

=== Mayor of Anchorage ===
On July 1, 2015, Berkowitz was sworn in as Anchorage's mayor. In his inauguration speech he urged city residents and leaders to work to overcome differences and "rise above the immediacy and smallness of the moment". On October 13, 2020, he announced that he would resign, effective October 23, after he acknowledged the previous day that he had been in a "consensual, inappropriate messaging relationship" with Maria Athens, a KYUR television anchor.

=== Other ventures ===
Berkowitz took the position of senior vice president of the Anchorage, Alaska branch of Strategies 360 in February 2011. He and Bernadette Wilson were co-hosts of the Bernadette and Berkowitz Show on Anchorage radio station KFQD in 2014. He left the show and began a mayoral campaign.

Alaska House of Representatives
Preceded by Gene Kubina	Minority Leader of the Alaska House of Representatives; 1999–2006	Succeeded by Beth Kerttula
Party political offices
Preceded by Gene Kubina	Democratic Leader of the Alaska House of Representatives; 1999–2006	Succeeded by Beth Kerttula
Preceded by Ernie Hall	Democratic nominee for Lieutenant Governor of Alaska; 2006	Succeeded by Diane Benson
Preceded by Tony Knowles	Democratic nominee for Governor of Alaska; 2010	Succeeded by Byron Mallott; Withdrew
Political offices
Preceded by Dan Sullivan	Mayor of Anchorage; 2015–2020	Succeeded by Austin Quinn-Davidson; Acting
