= Allen Joines =

American politician

James Allen Joines
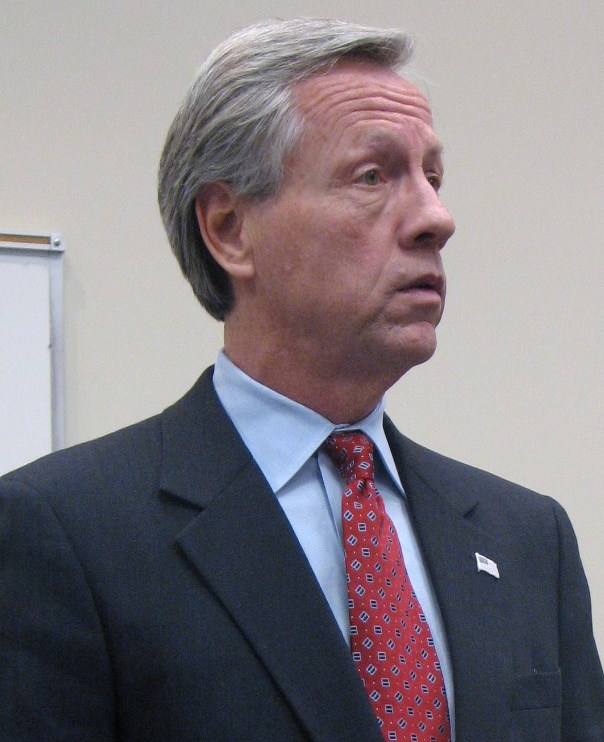

17th Mayor of Winston-Salem
- Incumbent
- Assumed office December 2001
- Preceded by: Jack Cavanagh

Personal details
- Born: September 17, 1947 (age 79)
- Party: Democratic
- Education: Appalachian State University; University of Georgia
- Profession: Public administrator

James Allen Joines (born September 17, 1947) is an American politician currently serving as the mayor of Winston-Salem, North Carolina. In 2009, he was also appointed chairman of the North Carolina Economic Development Board.

== Political career ==
Joines, a Democrat, was elected mayor of Winston-Salem on November 6, 2001. He defeated Republican incumbent Mayor Jack Cavanagh, Jr. by a wide margin. Before his election, Joines had served as deputy assistant city manager.

Joines had been named as a possible challenger to Congresswoman Virginia Foxx in North Carolina's 5th district in the 2006 election, but declined to enter the race.

In the 2012 North Carolina gubernatorial election, many suggested Joines as a potential candidate in the Democratic primary, but he declined, stating that there was still work he wished to do in Winston-Salem.

In the 2013 election, Joines was challenged by Gardenia Henley in the Democratic primary. His Republican opponent, James Knox, dropped out of the race in August after it was revealed he had used a racial epithet to refer to an elections worker, although his name was still on the ballot. Joines was elected to his fourth term in the general election.

In the 2016 election (Winston-Salem elections had moved to even-numbered years), Joines was easily re-elected, with only a write-in candidate opposing him.

== Electoral history ==
2001 mayoral election
Party	Candidate	Votes	%
Democratic	Allen Joines	23,893	78.29
Republican	Jack Cavanaugh, Jr. (incumbent)	6,546	21.54
Write-In	Write-ins	48	0.15
Total votes		30,487	

2005 mayoral election
Party	Candidate	Votes	%
Democratic	Allen Joines (incumbent)	10,014	98
Write-in	Write-in	238	2

2009 mayoral election
Party	Candidate	Votes	%
Democratic	Allen Joines (incumbent)	9,585	90.65
Write-in	Write-in	989	9.35

2013 mayoral election
Party	Candidate	Votes	%
Democratic	Allen Joines (incumbent)	12,948	84.33
Republican	James Lee Knox	2,315	15.08
Write-In	Mike Monu (write-in)	6	0.04
Write-In	Other write-ins	85	0.55
Total votes		15,354	

2016 mayoral election
Party	Candidate	Votes	%
Democratic	Allen Joines (incumbent)	88,784	94.07
Write-In	Joanne "Jo" Allen (write-in)	3,167	3.36
Write-In	Other write-ins	2,430	2.57
Total votes		94,381	

2020 mayoral election
Party	Candidate	Votes	%
Democratic	Allen Joines (incumbent)	85,705	71.71
Republican	Kris McCann	33,317	27.88
Write-In	Write-ins	488	2.57
Total votes		119,506	

2024 mayoral election
Party	Candidate	Votes	%
Democratic	Allen Joines (incumbent)	91,005	95.73
Write-In	Write-ins	4,059	4.3
Total votes		96,054	
