= List of mayors of Winston-Salem, North Carolina =

The following is a list of people who have served as the mayor of Winston-Salem, North Carolina, as well as those who served in the predecessor towns of Winston and Salem.

Winston-Salem mayors serve 4-year terms.

== Mayors of the town of Salem ==
Mayors of Salem from January 1857 to the merger with Winston in May 1913.

- Charles Brietz (1857-1858)
- E. A. Vogler (1858-1859)
- Charles Brietz (1859-1860)
- Dr. Augustus T. Zevely (1860-1863)
- John G. Sides (1863-1864)
- Joshua Boner (1864-1865)
- Dr. Augustus T. Zevely (1865-1866)
- Charles Brietz (1866-1867)
- John P. Vest (1867-1868)
- Augustus Fogle (1868-1873)
- John P. Vest (1873-1874)
- E.A. Vogler (1874-1875)
- Rufus Lenoir Patterson (1875-1876)
- Augustus Fogle (1876-1878)
- Dr. J. F. Shaffner, Sr. (1878-1884)
- C. H. Fogle (1884-1888)
- Augustus Fogle (1888-1889)
- Henry E. Fries (1889-1892)
- J. H. Stockton (1892-1893)
- T. B. Douthit (1893-1894)
- C. S. Hauser (1894-1896)
- Samuel E. Butner (1896-1901)
- J. A. Vance (1901-1903)
- Samuel E. Butner (1903-1907)
- Frank H. Vogler (1907-1911)
- Fred A. Fogle (1911-1913)

== Mayors of the town of Winston ==
Mayors of Winston between January 1859 and May 1913.

- William Barrow (1859-1860)
- P.A. Wilson (1860-1861)
- Robert Gray (1861-1862)
- H.K. Thomas (1862-1865)
- Thomas J. Wilson (1865-1866)
- T.T. Best (1866-1868)
- Jacob Tise (1868-1871)
- J.W. Alspaugh (1871-1872)
- P.A. Wilson (1882-1883)
- T.T. Best (1872-1873)
- J.W. Alspaugh 1873-1874
- T.T. Best (1874-1875)
- J.W. Alspaugh (1875-1876)
- D.P. Mast (1876)
- A. B. Gorrell (1876-1877)
- Martin Grogan (1877-1878)
- A. B. Gorrell (1878-1882)
- J.C. Buxton (1883-1884)
- Samuel H. Smith (1884-1885)
- Charles Buford (1885-1886)
- Thomas J. Wilson (1886-1887)
- Charles Buford (1887-1890)
- D.P. Mast (1890-1892)
- R. B. Kerner (1892-1893
- Garland E. Webb (1893-1894)
- Eugene E. Gray (1894-1896)
- P.W. Crutchfield (1896-1898)
- A. B. Gorrell (1898)
- J.F. Griffith (1898-1900)
- Oscar B. Eaton (1900-1911)
- Rufus I. Dalton (1911-1913)

== Mayors of the City of Winston-Salem ==
Mayors after the 1913 merger of Winston and Salem.

- Oscar B. Eaton (1913-1917)
- Robert W. Gorrell (1917-1921)
- James G. Hanes (1921-1925)
- Thomas Barber (1925-1929)
- George W. Coan (1929-1935)
- W.T. Wilson (1935-1939)
- James R Fain (1939-1941)
- R.J. Reynolds (1941-1942)
- J. Wilbur Crews (1942-1943)
- George W. Coan (1943-1945)
- George D. Lentz (1945-1949)
- Marshall Kurfees (1949-1961)
- John B. Surratt (1961-1963)
- M.C. Benton (1963-1970)
- Franklin Shirley (1970-1977)
- Wayne Corpening (1977-1989)
- Martha Wood (1989-1997)
- Jack Cavanagh (1997-2001)
- Allen Joines (2001-)

== See also ==
- Timeline of Winston-Salem, North Carolina
