= 2016 United States Senate election in Alaska =

- November 8, 2016
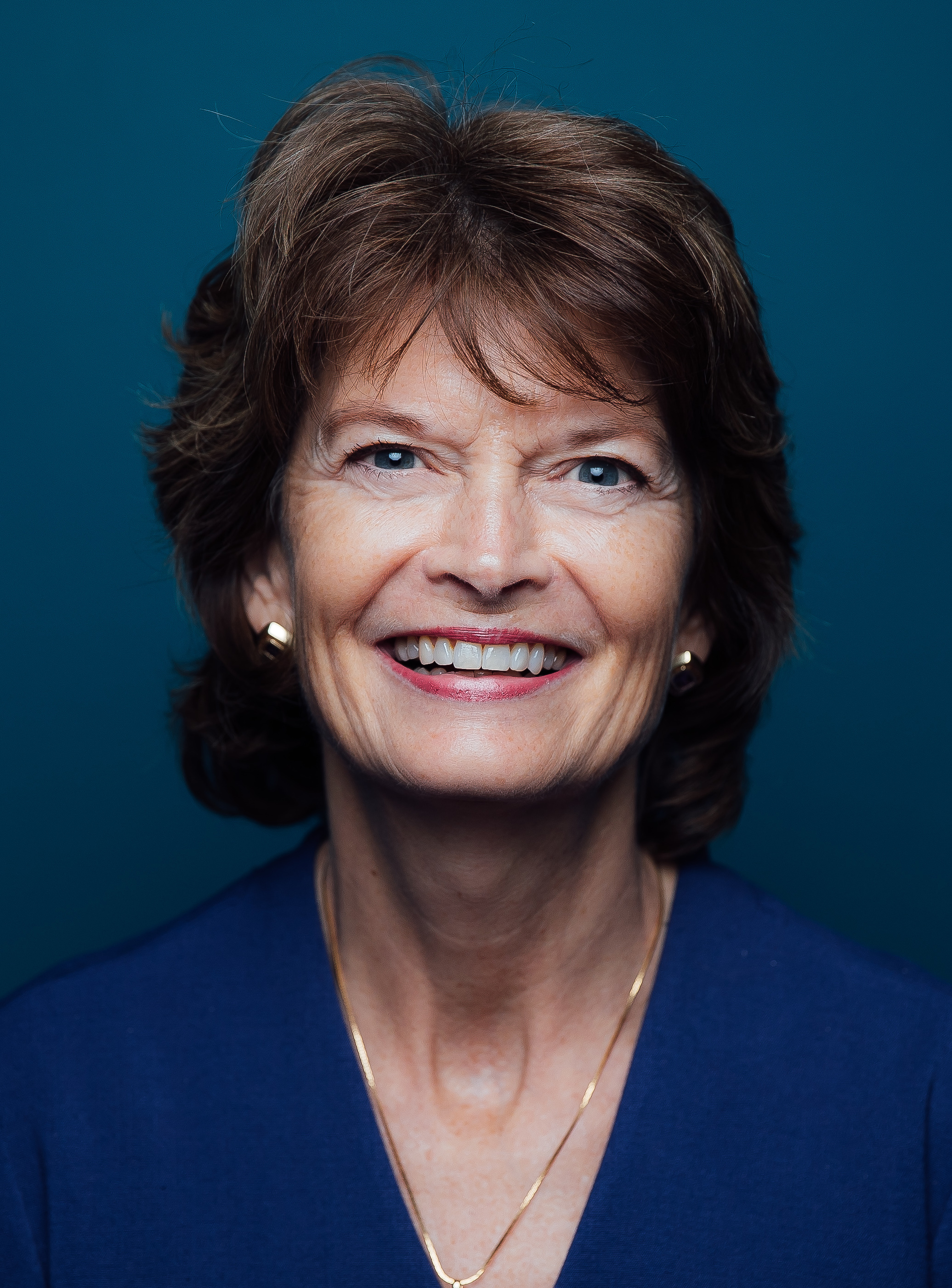

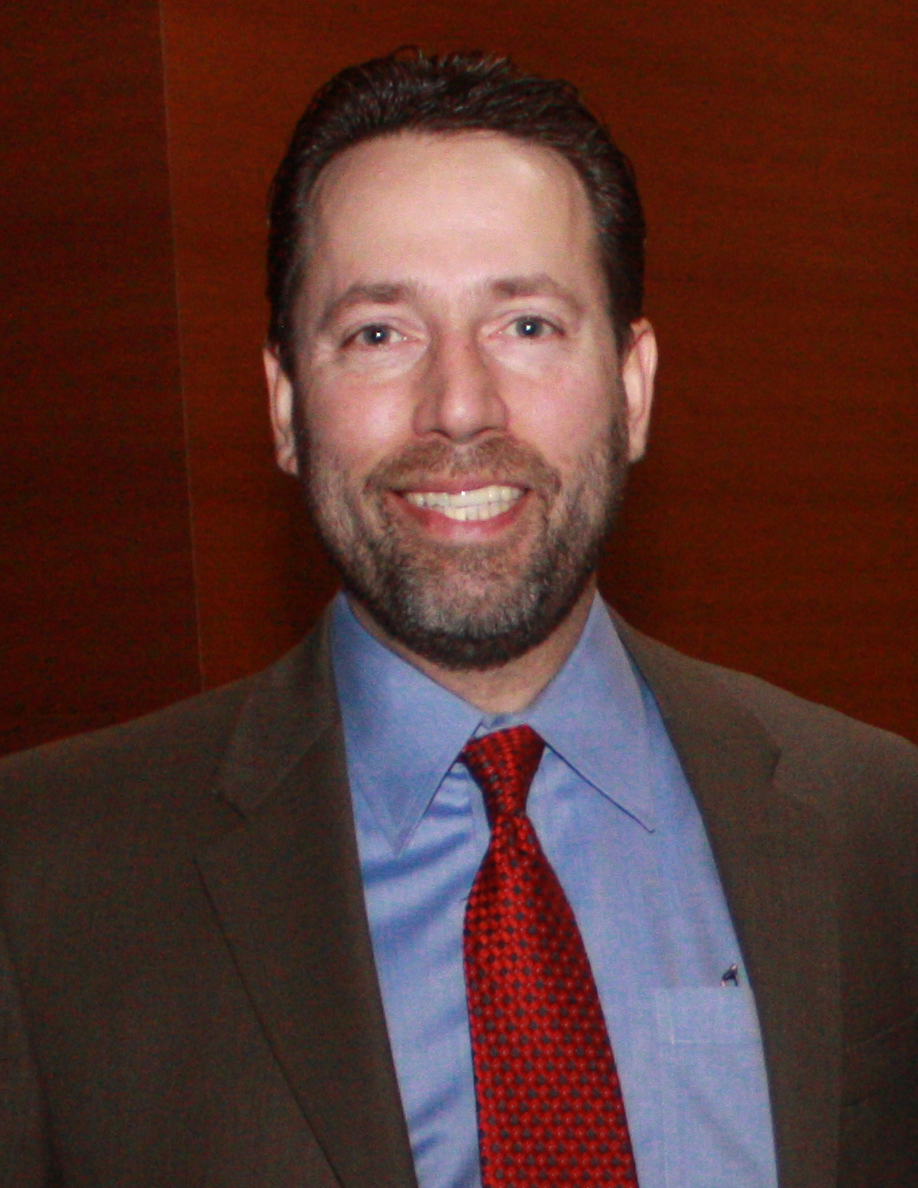

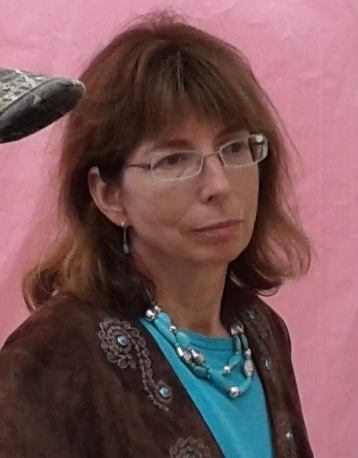

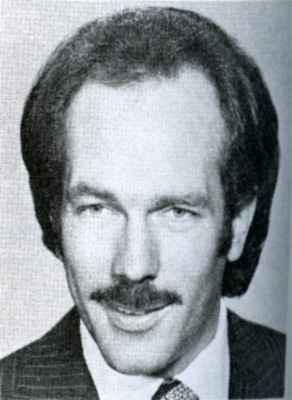
| Nominee | Lisa Murkowski | Joe Miller |
| Party | Republican | Libertarian |
| Popular vote | 138,149 | 90,825 |
| Percentage | 44.36% | 29.16% |
| Nominee | Margaret Stock | Ray Metcalfe |
| Party | Independent | Democratic |
| Popular vote | 41,194 | 36,200 |
| Percentage | 13.23% | 11.62% |
- Murkowski: 20–30% 30–40% 40–50% 50–60% 60–70% 70–80% Miller: 30–40% 40–50% 50–60% 60–70% Stock: 30–40% 40–50% 50–60% 60–70% 70–80% Metcalfe: 20–30% 30–40% Tie%/No Votes: 20–30% 30–40% 40–50% N/A
U.S. senator before election
Lisa Murkowski
Republican
Elected U.S. Senator
Lisa Murkowski
Republican

The 2016 United States Senate election in Alaska was held on November 8, 2016, to elect a member of the United States Senate to represent the State of Alaska, concurrently with the 2016 U.S. presidential election, other elections to the United States Senate in other states, elections to the United States House of Representatives, and various state and local elections.

Incumbent Republican Senator Lisa Murkowski won re-election to a third term in office. The primaries were held on August 16. She was challenged by several candidates, including Democrat Ray Metcalfe, a former Republican state legislator; Independent Margaret Stock, an attorney; and Libertarian Joe Miller, who had defeated Murkowski for the Republican nomination six years before.

Murkowski was re-elected with 44.4% of the vote, becoming the first person in history to win three elections to the U.S. Senate with pluralities but not majorities, having taken 48.6% in 2004 and 39.5% in 2010. Miller's 29.2% finish was then the best ever for a Libertarian candidate in a U.S. Senate election in terms of vote percentage. (Note: The Libertarian Party of Massachusetts set the total vote records in 2000 and 2002 with over 300,000 both times and in races with and without Republican opponents; Gary Johnson also won over 100,000 votes in New Mexico in 2018.) This record was surpassed four years later by Ricky Dale Harrington Jr., who received 33.4% of the vote in the 2020 Arkansas Senate election, which had no Democratic candidate. This was also the first U.S. Senate election where four candidates received more than 10% of the vote since the 1942 Minnesota race, as well as being the first Senate race since then where the Democratic nominee finished fourth.

== Background ==
After Republican U.S. Senator Frank Murkowski was elected governor of Alaska in 2002, he appointed his daughter Lisa to the Senate to replace him. She was elected to a full term in 2004 but was defeated in the Republican primary in 2010 by Tea Party challenger Joe Miller. She ran as a write-in candidate in the general election and was re-elected to a second full term with 39.5% of the vote to Miller's 35.5% and Democratic nominee Scott McAdams' 23.5%. She is one of only two U.S. Senators to be elected via write-in votes, the other being Strom Thurmond in 1954.

== Republican primary ==
As Murkowski was defeated in the Republican primary in 2010, it had been speculated that she would be challenged from the right again in 2016.

=== Candidates ===
==== Declared ====
- Paul Kendall
- Thomas Lamb, candidate for the state house in 2006
- Bob Lochner, mechanic and candidate for the state house in 1996
- Lisa Murkowski, incumbent U.S. senator since 2002

==== Withdrew ====
- Dan Sullivan, former mayor of Anchorage and nominee for lieutenant governor in 2014 (not related to Dan Sullivan, Alaska's other U.S. senator)

==== Declined ====
- David Cuddy, former state representative and candidate for the U.S. Senate in 1996 and 2008
- Mike J. Dunleavy, state senator
- Joe Miller, former magistrate judge, Republican nominee for the U.S. Senate in 2010 and candidate for the U.S. Senate in 2014
- Sarah Palin, former governor of Alaska and nominee for Vice President of the United States in 2008
- Sean Parnell, former governor of Alaska and candidate for Congress in 2008
- Mead Treadwell, former lieutenant governor and candidate for U.S. Senate in 2014

=== Endorsements ===
Lisa Murkowski

Governors

- Bill Weld, 68th governor of Massachusetts, and 2016 Libertarian Party vice presidential nominee

U.S. senators

- Dan Sullivan, Alaska
Bob Lochner

Individuals

- Bruce Walden, 2016 Veterans Party nominee for U.S. Senate

Organiations

- Alaska Republican Assembly
- Alaska Right to Life

=== Results ===
Republican primary results
| Party | Candidate | Votes | % |
|---|---|---|---|
| Republican | Lisa Murkowski (incumbent) | 39,545 | 71.52% |
| Republican | Bob Lochner | 8,480 | 15.34% |
| Republican | Paul Kendall | 4,272 | 7.73% |
| Republican | Thomas Lamb | 2,996 | 5.42% |
| Total votes | | 55,293 | 100.00% |

== Democratic–Libertarian–Independence primary ==
Candidates from the Alaska Democratic Party, Alaska Libertarian Party and Alaskan Independence Party appear on the same ballot, with the highest-placed candidate from each party receiving that party's nomination.

=== Democratic candidates ===
==== Declared ====
- Edgar Blatchford, founder and former editor and publisher of Alaska Newspapers, Inc., former mayor of Seward and former commissioner of the Alaska Department of Commerce, Community and Economic Development
- Ray Metcalfe, former Republican state representative and founder of the Republican Moderate Party of Alaska

==== Removed ====
- Richard Grayson, perennial candidate from New York

==== Declined ====
- Mark Begich, former U.S. senator

=== Libertarian candidates ===
==== Declared ====
- Cean Stevens, small business owner, nominee for the state house in 2014 and Republican nominee for the state house in 2012

=== Results ===
Primary results
| Party | Candidate | Votes | % |
|---|---|---|---|
| Democratic | Ray Metcalfe | 15,228 | 50.06% |
| Democratic | Edgar Blatchford | 10,090 | 33.17% |
| Libertarian | Cean Stevens | 5,102 | 16.77% |
| Total votes | | 30,420 | 100.00% |

=== Subsequent events ===
Cean Stevens was originally the only Libertarian to file, and was the sole Libertarian in the primary. Stevens withdrew after winning the nomination, and the Alaska Libertarian Party nominated Joe Miller as her replacement.

== Third party and independent candidates ==
=== Declared ===
- Breck Craig (independent)
- Ted Gianoutsos (independent), founder of the Veterans Party of Alaska and perennial candidate
- Margaret Stock (independent), attorney and retired Army lt. colonel

=== Failed to qualify ===
- Sid Hill (independent)
- Bruce Walden (Veterans Party), retired Army sergeant and Republican candidate for the state house in 2006
- Jed Whittaker (independent), commercial fisherman, Republican candidate for the U.S. Senate in 1992 and Green Party nominee for the U.S. Senate in 1996

=== Declined ===
- Mark Begich (write-in), former U.S. senator

== General election ==
=== Debates ===
- Complete video of debate, November 4, 2016 - C-SPAN

=== Fundraising ===
| Candidate | Raised | Spent | Cash on hand |
|---|---|---|---|
| Lisa Murkowski (R) | $6,058,418 | $7,055,457 | $91,119 |
| Ray Metcalfe (D) | $20,865 | $13,147 | $7,718 |
| Margaret Stock (I) | $740,769 | $738,918 | $1,850 |
| Joe Miller (L) | $122 | $445 | $99,402 |

=== Predictions ===
| Source | Ranking | As of |
|---|---|---|
| The Cook Political Report | Likely R | November 2, 2016 |
| Sabato's Crystal Ball | Safe R | November 7, 2016 |
| Rothenberg Political Report | Safe R | November 3, 2016 |
| Daily Kos | Safe R | November 8, 2016 |
| Real Clear Politics | Safe R | November 7, 2016 |

=== Polling ===
| Poll source | Date(s) administered | Sample size | Margin of error | Lisa Murkowski (R) | Joe Miller (L) | Ray Metcalfe (D) | Margaret Stock (I) | Other | Undecided |
|---|---|---|---|---|---|---|---|---|---|
| Moore Information | October 5–6, 2016 | 500 | ± 4.0% | 49% | 16% | 9% | 8% | 1% | 15% |
| Alaska Survey Research | September 28 – October 2, 2016 | 660 | ± 3.8% | 50% | 18% | 12% | 7% | 2% | 11% |
| Moore Information | September 13–15, 2016 | 500 | ±4.0% | 48% | 15% | 15% | 7% | 1% | 12% |
| Moore Information (R-Murkowski) | August 27–29, 2016 | 500 | ± 4.0% | 56% | — | 12% | 5% | 10% | 17% |

Hypothetical polling

| Poll source | Date(s) administered | Sample size | Margin of error | Lisa Murkowski (R) | Ray Metcalfe (D) | Undecided |
|---|---|---|---|---|---|---|
| SurveyMonkey | November 1–7, 2016 | 409 | ± 4.6% | 55% | 33% | 12% |
| SurveyMonkey | October 31 – November 6, 2016 | 382 | ± 4.6% | 57% | 32% | 11% |
| SurveyMonkey | October 27 – November 2, 2016 | 303 | ± 4.6% | 60% | 25% | 15% |
| SurveyMonkey | October 28 – November 3, 2016 | 334 | ± 4.6% | 56% | 30% | 14% |
| SurveyMonkey | October 26 – November 1, 2016 | 268 | ± 4.6% | 60% | 22% | 18% |
| SurveyMonkey | October 25–31, 2016 | 300 | ± 4.6% | 57% | 26% | 22% |

=== Endorsements ===
Lisa Murkowski (R)

Individuals

- Dan Sullivan, U.S. senator
- Bill Weld, former governor of Massachusetts and Libertarian nominee for vice president of the United States in 2016

Labor unions

- National Education Association

Organizations

- National Rifle Association - Political Victory Fund
- United States Chamber of Commerce
Joe Miller (L)

Individuals

- Amy Demboski, Anchorage assemblywoman and candidate for mayor of Anchorage in 2015
- Paul Kendall, Republican candidate for the U.S. Senate in 2016
- Tom Lamb, Republican candidate for the U.S. Senate in 2016
- Mark Levin, host of The Mark Levin Show
- Bob Lochner, Republican candidate for the U.S. Senate in 2016

Organizations

- Alaska Republican Assembly
- Alaska Right to Life
- Gun Owners of America
Margaret Stock (I)

Individuals

- Mark Begich, former U.S. senator
- Jeff King, Iditarod Trail Sled Dog Race champion

Organizations

- The Centrist Project

=== Results ===
2016 United States Senate election in Alaska
| Party | Candidate | Votes | % | ±% |
|---|---|---|---|---|
| Republican | Lisa Murkowski (incumbent) | 138,149 | 44.36% | +8.87% |
| Libertarian | Joe Miller | 90,825 | 29.16% | +28.59% |
| Independent | Margaret Stock | 41,194 | 13.23% | N/A |
| Democratic | Ray Metcalfe | 36,200 | 11.62% | −11.84% |
| Independent | Breck A. Craig | 2,609 | 0.84% | N/A |
| Independent | Ted Gianoutsos | 1,758 | 0.56% | N/A |
| Write-in | | 706 | 0.23% | −39.70% |
| Total votes | | 311,441 | 100.00% | N/A |
| Republican hold | | | | |
