= Margaret Stock =

American politician

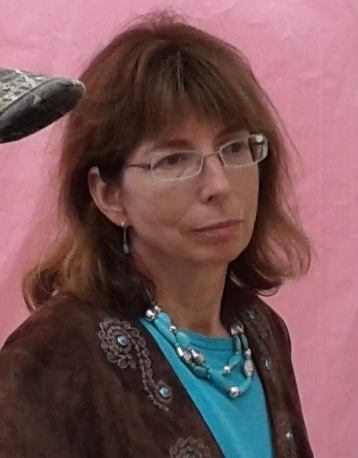

Personal details
- Born: 1961 (age 64–65) Boston, Massachusetts, U.S.
- Party: Republican (before 2016); Independent (2016–present)
- Education: Harvard University (AB, JD, MPA); United States Army War College (MS)
- Website: Campaign website

Military service
- Allegiance: United States
- Branch/service: United States Army
- Rank: Lieutenant Colonel
- Unit: Military Police Corps

Margaret D. Stock (born 1961) is an American politician, immigration attorney, and retired Lieutenant Colonel in the United States Army Reserve. She is a recognized expert on immigration law as it applies to U.S. military personnel and veterans.

Stock is a 2013 recipient of a MacArthur Fellowship. She has taught law at the United States Military Academy in West Point, New York.

She ran for the United States Senate as an independent candidate in the 2016 Senate election in Alaska.

== Early life and education ==
Stock was born in Boston in 1961 and grew up in Wellesley, Massachusetts. She was the fourth of nine children. When she was six years old, her father had the first of several heart attacks, and he died when she was 15. The family was in crisis, and she spent time in a homeless shelter and a foster home. While in high school, she got involved the Civil Air Patrol but she dropped out of high school before graduating.

A high school guidance counselor helped her gain admission to Boston University, where she enlisted in the Reserve Officer Training Corps. She completed paratrooper training at Fort Benning, Georgia, and later transferred to Harvard.

Stock earned a Bachelor of Arts degree in government from Radcliffe College in 1985, a Juris Doctor from Harvard Law School in 1992, a Master of Public Administration from the Harvard Kennedy School of Government in 2001, and a Master of Science in strategic studies from the U.S. Army War College in 2006.

== Career ==
Stock led the development of three programs pertaining to immigration issues within the US military. The Military Accessions Vital to National Interest (MAVNI) program, started in 2008, in cooperation with the Department of Defense and Department of Homeland Security, helped the U.S. Armed Forces to attract and retain foreign nationals with language, medical, and other skills critical to military readiness and national security. She spearheaded the American Immigration Lawyers Association (AILA) MAP program, "which pairs volunteer attorneys across the United States" with military families in need of their services. She also helped start the naturalization at Basic Combat Training program.

Stock has also spent many years teaching. From 2001 to 2010, she worked as a professor at the United States Military Academy at West Point first in the Department of Law, then in the Department of Social Sciences. She also taught at the University of Alaska Anchorage in the political science department for two years. She is a former member of the Federalist Society.

== 2016 Senate campaign ==
In 2016, Stock ran as an independent against Republican U.S. Senator Lisa Murkowski. Her candidacy received the support of former Senator Mark Begich, a Democrat. Stock came in third with 13.2% of the total vote, approximately 5,000 more votes than Democratic nominee Ray Metcalfe.

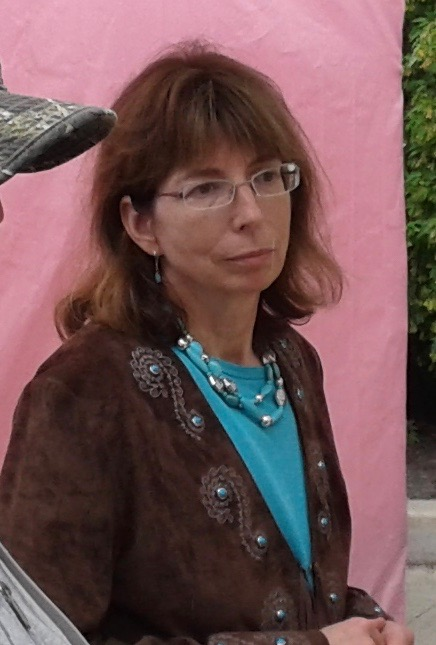
Stock in 2016

== Recognition ==
The Washington Times called her "the foremost authority on military veterans facing deportation." Stock has testified regularly before Congress on issues involving immigration and national security.

=== Awards ===
- 2013 – MacArthur Fellowship by John D. & Catherine T. MacArthur Foundation
- 2009 – Joint Service Commendation Medal by United States Armed Forces
- 2008 – Michael Maggio Pro Bono Award by American Immigration Lawyers Association
- 2005 – Advocacy Award by American Immigration Lawyers Association

== Bibliography ==
- What Every Lawyer Needs to Know about Non-Citizens & the United States Military, in What Every Lawyer Needs to Know About Immigration Law, American Bar Association, Section of Administrative Law & Regulatory Practice (2014) (book chapter).
- AILA's Guide to U.S. Citizenship & Naturalization Law, American Immigration Lawyers Association, 2014, at 153–182 (book chapter).
- Immigration Law and the Military (American Immigration Lawyers Association 2012) (book).
- Professionals: A Matter of Degree (5th Ed.) (co-authored with Martin J. Lawler) (AILA 2009).
- The Role of Immigration in A Coordinated National Security Policy, 21 Georgetown Immigration Law Journal 383 (2007) (co-authored with Donald Kerwin).
