= Lisa Murkowski =

American attorney and politician (born 1957)

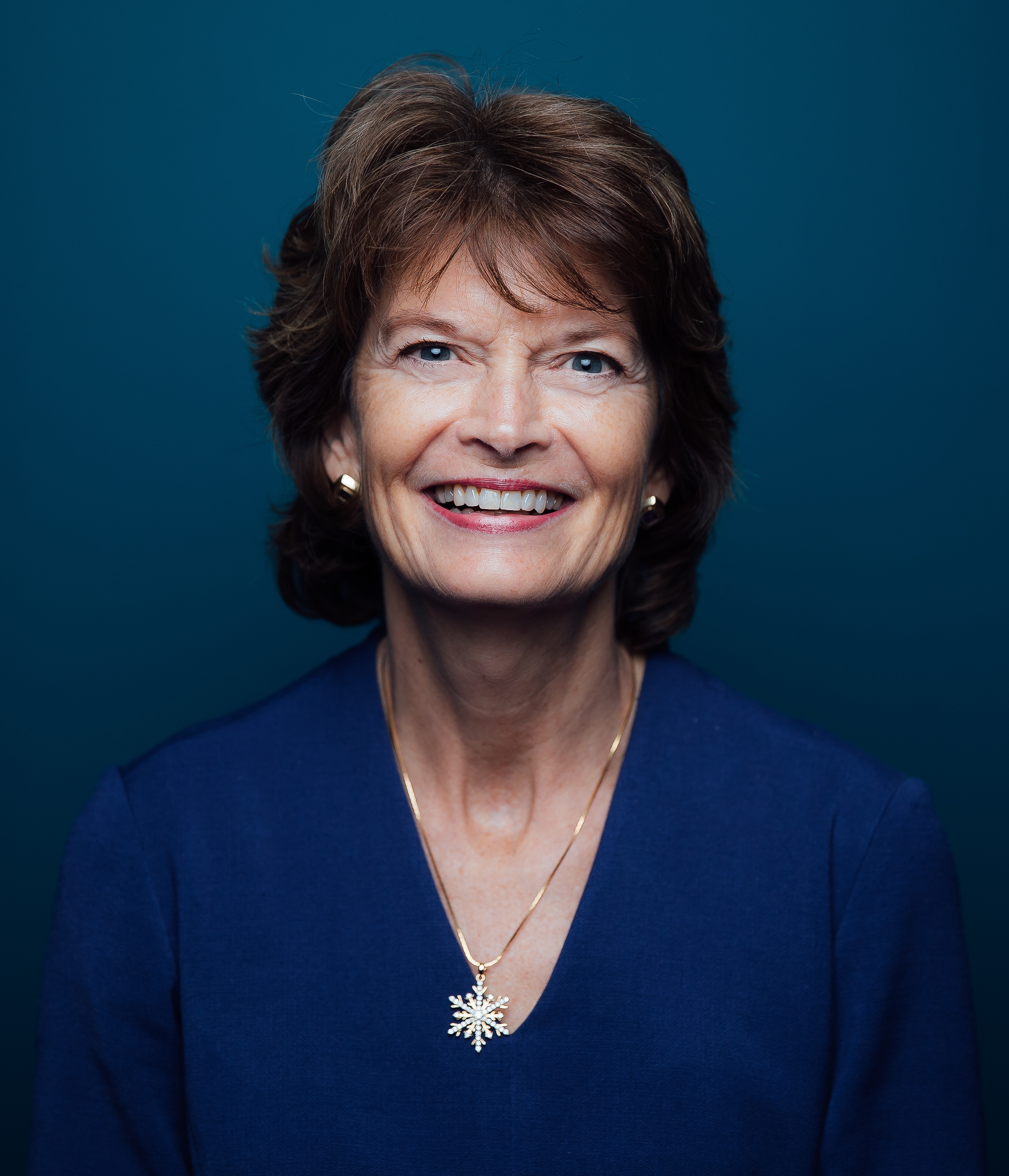
- Official portrait, 2017

United States Senator from Alaska
- Incumbent
- Assumed office December 20, 2002 Serving with Dan Sullivan
- Preceded by: Frank Murkowski
Senate positions
Chair of the Senate Indian Affairs Committee
Incumbent
Assumed office January 3, 2025
Preceded by	Brian Schatz
Vice Chair of the Senate Indian Affairs Committee
In office February 3, 2021 – January 3, 2025
Preceded by	Tom Udall
Succeeded by	Brian Schatz
In office July 19, 2007 – January 3, 2009
Preceded by	Craig Thomas
Succeeded by	John Barrasso
Chair of the Senate Energy Committee
In office January 3, 2015 – February 3, 2021
Preceded by	Mary Landrieu
Succeeded by	Joe Manchin
Ranking Member of the Senate Energy Committee
In office January 3, 2009 – January 3, 2015
Preceded by	Pete Domenici
Succeeded by	Maria Cantwell
Vice Chair of the Senate Republican Conference
In office June 17, 2009 – September 17, 2010
Leader	Mitch McConnell
Preceded by	John Thune
Succeeded by	John Barrasso

Member of the Alaska House of Representatives from the 14th district
- In office January 19, 1999 – December 20, 2002
- Preceded by: Terry Martin
- Succeeded by: Vic Kohring

Personal details
- Born: Lisa Ann Murkowski; May 22, 1957 (age 69) Ketchikan, Alaska Territory, U.S.
- Party: Republican
- Spouse: Verne Martell (m. 1987)
- Children: 2
- Relatives: Frank Murkowski (father)
- Education: Georgetown University (BA); Willamette University (JD)
- Website: Senate website Campaign website
- Murkowski's voice Murkowski supporting the Infrastructure Investment and Jobs Act; Recorded August 1, 2021

Lisa Ann Murkowski (/mərˈkaʊski/ mər-KOW-ski; born May 22, 1957) is an American attorney and politician serving as the senior United States senator from the state of Alaska, having held the seat since 2002. She is the first woman to represent Alaska in the U.S. Congress and is the Senate's second-most senior Republican woman. Murkowski became dean of Alaska's congressional delegation upon Representative Don Young's death.

Murkowski is the daughter of former U.S. senator and governor of Alaska Frank Murkowski. She was appointed to the Senate by her father, who resigned his seat in 2002 to become Alaska's governor. Murkowski became the first Alaskan-born member of Congress and completed her father's unexpired Senate term, which ended in January 2005. Before her appointment to the Senate, she had been a member of the Alaska House of Representatives since 1999. Murkowski ran for and won a full term in 2004 with 48% of the vote. After losing the 2010 Republican primary to Tea Party candidate Joe Miller, she ran as a write-in candidate and defeated both Miller and Democrat Scott McAdams in the general election. Murkowski was reelected in 2016 and again in 2022. She was vice chair of the Senate Republican Conference from 2009 to 2010 and chair of the Senate Energy and Natural Resources Committee from 2015 to 2021. She served as vice chair of the Senate Indian Affairs Committee from 2021 to 2025 and has served as chair of the committee since January 2025.

Murkowski is often described as one of the Senate's most moderate Republicans and a swing vote. According to Roll Call, she voted with President Barack Obama's position 72.3% of the time in 2013; she was one of only two Republicans to vote with Obama over 70% of the time. She opposed Brett Kavanaugh's Supreme Court nomination in 2018 and supported Ketanji Brown Jackson's Supreme Court nomination in 2022. In 2021, she was one of seven Republican senators to vote to convict Donald Trump of incitement of insurrection in his second impeachment trial; the Alaska Republican Party censured her for that vote. Murkowski was a pivotal Republican vote for the first Trump administration's Tax Cuts and Jobs Act and the second Trump administration's One Big Beautiful Bill Act.

== Early life, education, and early career ==
Murkowski was born in Ketchikan in the Territory of Alaska, the daughter of Nancy Rena (née Gore) and Frank Murkowski. Her paternal great-grandfather was of Polish descent, and her mother's ancestry is Irish and French Canadian. As a child, she and her family moved around the state with her father's job as a banker. After high school, Murkowski interned under Senator Ted Stevens in a Washington summer internship program. She attended Willamette University for two years before transferring to Georgetown University. She earned a B.A. degree in economics from Georgetown University in 1980, the same year her father was elected to the U.S. Senate. She is a member of Pi Beta Phi sorority and represented Alaska as the 1980 Cherry Blossom Princess. She received her J.D. degree in 1985 from Willamette University College of Law. Murkowski failed the bar exam four times, passing on her fifth attempt.

Murkowski worked as an attorney in the Anchorage District Court Clerk's office from 1987 to 1989. From 1989 to 1998, she was an attorney in private practice in Anchorage. She served on the Mayor's Task Force for the Homeless from 1990 to 1991.

== Alaska House of Representatives ==
In 1998, Murkowski was elected to the Alaska House of Representatives. Her District 18 included northeast Anchorage, Fort Richardson and Elmendorf Air Force Base (now Joint Base Elmendorf-Richardson, or JBER), and suburban parts of Eagle River-Chugiak. In 1999, she introduced legislation establishing a Joint Armed Services Committee. She was reelected in 2000 and, after her district boundaries changed, in 2002. That year she had a conservative primary opponent, Nancy Dahlstrom, who challenged her because Murkowski supported abortion rights and rejected conservative economics. Murkowski won by 56 votes. She was named as House Majority Leader for the 2003–04 legislative session. She resigned her House seat before taking office, due to her appointment by her father to the seat he had vacated in the U.S. Senate, upon his stepping down to assume the Alaska governorship. Murkowski sat on the Alaska Commission on Post Secondary Education and chaired both the Labor and Commerce and the Military and Veterans Affairs Committees. After she resigned to join the U.S. Senate, her father appointed Dahlstrom, the choice of the district's Republican committee, as her replacement.

== U.S. Senate ==
=== Appointment ===
In December 2002, Murkowski—while a member of the state House—was appointed by her father, Governor Frank Murkowski, to fill his own U.S. Senate seat made vacant when he resigned from the Senate after being elected governor. The appointment, which many Alaska voters saw as a product of nepotism, caused considerable controversy. She was the first daughter to be appointed to her father's Senate seat. Her appointment eventually resulted in a referendum that stripped the governor of the power to directly appoint replacement senators. Along with others eligible to be considered, future Alaska governor Sarah Palin interviewed for the seat. Murkowski was sworn in on January 7, 2003.

=== Elections ===
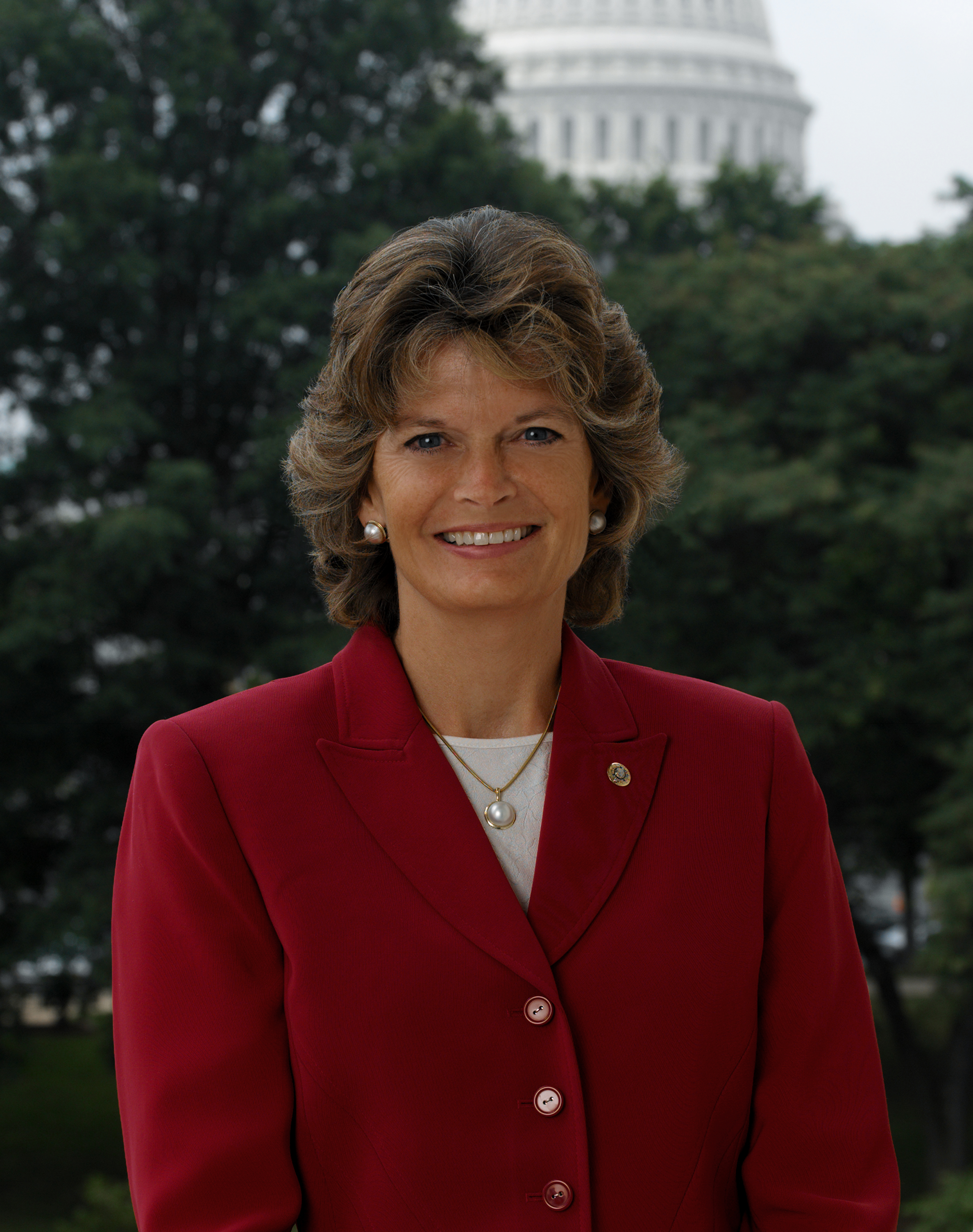
Murkowski in 2005

Murkowski has had several close challenges but has never lost a general election. She has won four full terms to the Senate; she won 48.6% of the vote in 2004, 39.5% in 2010, 44.4% in 2016 and 53.7% in 2022.

==== 2004 ====
Murkowski ran for a full Senate term against former Governor Tony Knowles in the 2004 election after winning a primary challenge by a large margin. She was considered vulnerable due to the controversy over her appointment, and polling showed the race was very close. The centrist Republican Main Street Partnership, which wanted to run TV ads for Murkowski, was told no airtime was left to buy. Murkowski defeated Knowles by 9,349 votes.

==== 2010 ====
Murkowski faced a challenge from Joe Miller, a former U.S. magistrate judge supported by former Governor Sarah Palin, in the August 24, 2010, Republican Party primary election. The initial results showed Murkowski trailing Miller, 51–49%, with absentee ballots yet to be tallied. After the first round of absentee ballots was counted on August 31, Murkowski conceded, saying that she did not believe that Miller's lead could be overcome in the next round of absentee vote counting. Miller received 55,878 votes to Murkowski's 53,872.

After the primary, the Murkowski campaign floated the idea of her running as a Libertarian in the general election. On August 29, 2010, the state Libertarian Party executive board voted not to consider Murkowski as its Senate nominee.

On September 17, 2010, Murkowski said she would mount a write-in campaign for the Senate seat. Her campaign was aided in large part by substantial funding from state teachers' and firefighters' unions, Native corporations, and PACs.

On November 17, 2010, the Associated Press reported that Murkowski had become only the second Senate candidate (after Strom Thurmond in 1954) to win a write-in campaign. She emerged victorious after a two-week count of write-in ballots showed that she had overtaken Miller. Miller did not concede. U.S. Federal District Judge Ralph Beistline granted an injunction to stop the certification of the election due to "serious" legal issues and irregularities Miller raised about the hand count of absentee ballots. On December 10, 2010, an Alaskan judge dismissed Miller's case, clearing the way for Murkowski's certification, but on December 13, Miller appealed the decision to the Alaska Supreme Court. The state Supreme Court rejected Miller's appeal on December 22. On December 28, Beistline dismissed Miller's lawsuit. Governor Sean Parnell certified Murkowski as the winner on December 30.

==== 2016 ====
After securing the Republican Party nomination by a wide margin, Murkowski was again reelected to the Senate in 2016. Joe Miller, this time the Libertarian Party nominee, was again the runner-up. The election was unusual in featuring a Libertarian Party nominee who endorsed the Republican presidential nominee, Donald Trump, running against a Republican incumbent who did not. The Libertarian vice-presidential nominee, former Governor of Massachusetts Bill Weld, endorsed Murkowski, citing Miller's support for Trump and "devoted social conservative" views as incompatible with libertarianism.

==== 2022 ====
In 2017, Murkowski filed to run for a fourth term in 2022. Due to her opposition to some of his initiatives, former President Donald Trump pledged in June 2020 to support a Republican challenger to Murkowski, saying: "Get any candidate ready, good or bad, I don't care. I'm endorsing. If you have a pulse, I'm with you!" She was one of seven Republican senators who voted to convict Trump in his second impeachment trial in February 2021, and was the only one up for reelection in 2022. After her vote, Alaska's GOP censured Murkowski and demanded her resignation. Despite Trump's pledge, Senate Minority Leader Mitch McConnell signaled Republican senators' commitment to back Murkowski's 2022 campaign. During her 2022 campaign, Murkowski was supported by Democratic colleagues, including Jeanne Shaheen, and Independent Senator Angus King.

On June 18, 2021, Trump endorsed former Alaska Department of Administration commissioner Kelly Tshibaka for the Senate in 2022, calling her "MAGA all the way". Murkowski later called Tshibaka "apparently ... someone with a pulse", referencing Trump's previous statement. On July 10, 2021, the Alaska Republican Party endorsed Tshibaka. Murkowski won reelection by beating Tshibaka in both the first and final round of ranked-choice voting. She received 53.7% of the vote after the ranked-choice tabulation.

=== Tenure and political positions ===
Murkowski is considered a moderate Republican. Since she was reelected in 2010, her voting record has been said to be more moderate than before. In 2013, the National Journal gave Murkowski a composite score of 56% conservative and 45% liberal, and ranked her the 56th most liberal and 44th most conservative member of the Senate. According to CQ Roll Call, Murkowski voted with President Barack Obama's position 72.3% of the time in 2013; she was one of only two Senate Republicans to support Obama's position over 70% of the time. In 2017, The New York Times arranged Republican senators by ideology and ranked Murkowski the second-most liberal Republican. According to GovTrack, as of 2018, Murkowski was the second-most liberal Republican senator, to the left of all Senate Republicans except Susan Collins, and to the left of Democratic Senator Joe Manchin. According to FiveThirtyEight, Murkowski had voted in accordance with President Donald Trump's position approximately 72.6% of the time as of January 2021. According to FiveThirtyEight, as of January 2023, Murkowski had voted with President Joe Biden's position about 67% of the time. In 2023, the Lugar Center ranked Murkowski seventh among senators for bipartisanship.

In 2018, Murkowski stated her opposition to the confirmation of Justice Brett Kavanaugh to the Supreme Court of the United States. Nevertheless, she voted "present" on the nomination as a favor to Senator Steve Daines, who supported the nomination but was unavailable to attend the vote because of his daughter's wedding. In 2020, she voted against procedural motions to accelerate Amy Coney Barrett's confirmation to that court, though she later voted to confirm Barrett. On April 7, 2022, she voted to confirm Ketanji Brown Jackson to the Supreme Court, with only two other Republicans, Collins and Mitt Romney, joining her.

In a March 2019 op-ed for The Washington Post, Murkowski and Joe Manchin wrote that climate change debate in Congress was depicted as "an issue with just two sides—those who support drastic, unattainable measures to reduce greenhouse-gas emissions, and those who want to do nothing", and affirmed their support for "adopting reasonable policies that...build on and accelerate current efforts [and] ensure a robust innovation ecosystem."

During the first impeachment trial of Donald Trump, Murkowski called Trump's actions "shameful and wrong", but said "she cannot vote to convict" Trump and that his personal interests did not take precedence over those of the nation. She joined almost all Senate Republicans in voting to acquit Trump on both articles.

In December 2020, during his lame-duck period, Trump vetoed the National Defense Authorization Act for Fiscal Year 2021. The veto left new Coast Guard cutters that were scheduled to be homeported in Alaska without port facilities to maintain them. Murkowski issued a press release that said, in part, "It’s incredible that the President chose to veto the annual National Defense Authorization Act, particularly because his reason for doing so is an issue not related to national defense."

After Trump supporters attacked the United States Capitol on January 6, 2021, Murkowski said Trump should resign for inciting the insurrection. With this, she became the first Senate Republican to say that Trump should leave office before Joe Biden was inaugurated. On February 13, she was one of seven Republican senators to vote to convict Trump in his second impeachment trial. That vote failed for lack of a two-thirds majority. On May 27, along with five other Republicans and all present Democrats, Murkowski voted to establish a bipartisan commission to investigate the Capitol attack. The vote failed for lack of 60 required "yes" votes.

Along with all other Senate and House Republicans, Murkowski voted against the American Rescue Plan Act of 2021. On September 30, 2021, she was among the 15 Senate Republicans to vote with all Democrats and both Independents for a temporary spending bill to avoid a government shutdown. On October 7, Murkowski voted with 10 other Republicans and all members of the Democratic caucus to break the filibuster of raising the debt ceiling, but also voted with all Republicans against the bill to raise the debt ceiling.

On February 5, 2022, Murkowski joined Arkansas Governor Asa Hutchinson in condemning the Republican National Committee's censure of Representatives Adam Kinzinger and Liz Cheney for supporting and participating in the Select Committee of the U.S. House that was tasked with investigating the January 6 United States Capitol attack.

Murkowski supports the Equal Rights Amendment. In 2022, she and 11 other Senate Republicans voted for the Respect for Marriage Act. As of 2023, Murkowski supports ConocoPhillips's controversial Willow oil drilling project on North Slope Borough, Alaska. In 2024, Murkowski and Senator Sheldon Whitehouse co-authored legislation to ban the commercial farming of octopuses. They cited concerns relating to octopus intelligence and animal rights.

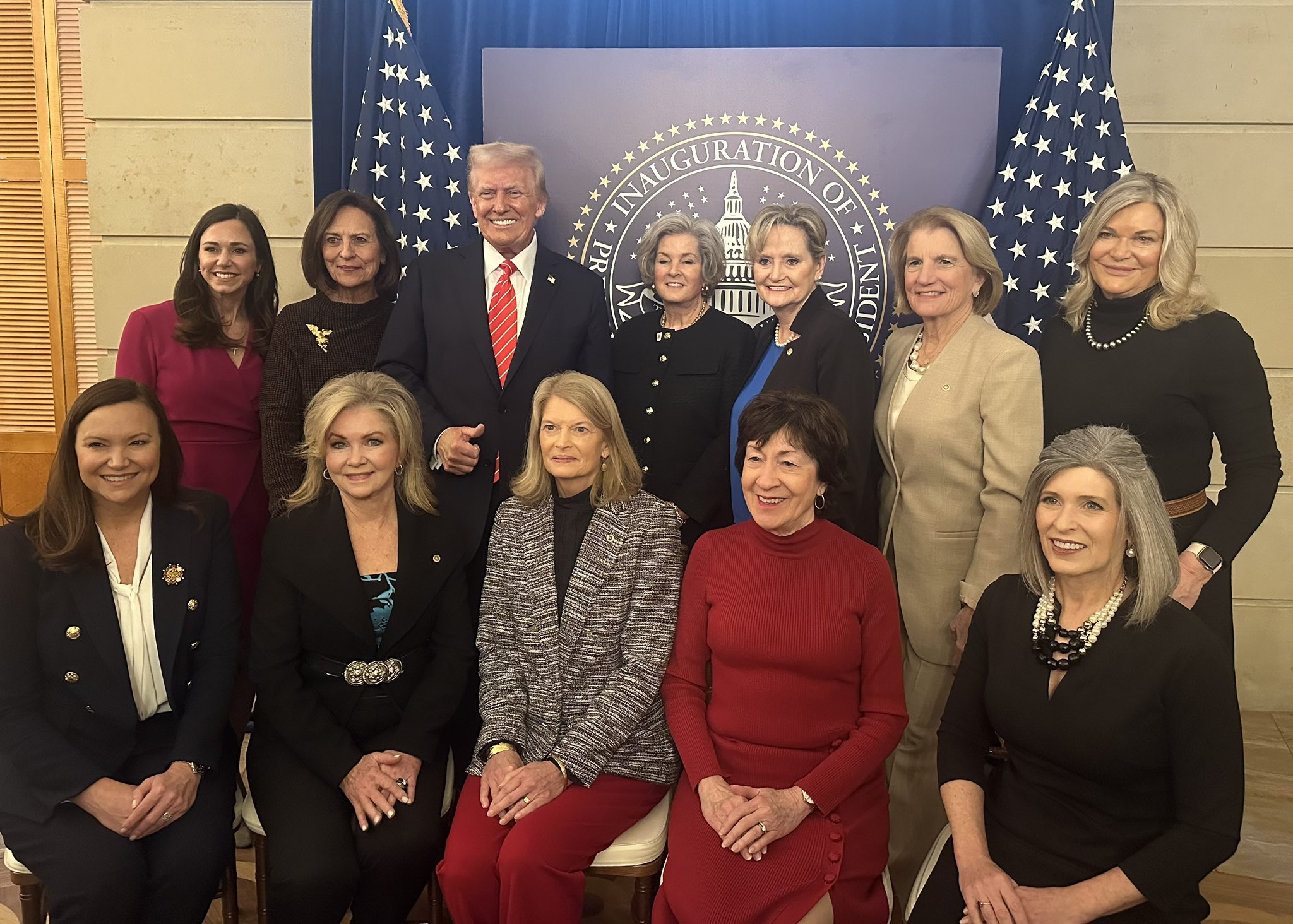
Murkowski with President Donald Trump, Susie Wiles, and fellow female Republican senators, January 2025

In 2021, when asked whether she would remain a Republican, Murkowski replied, "if the Republican Party has become nothing more than the party of Trump, I sincerely question whether this is the party for me", but added, "I have absolutely no desire to move over to the Democratic side of the aisle. I can't be somebody that I'm not." In 2024, when asked if she intended to remain a Republican, Murkowski replied that she was "independently minded". Asked whether that meant she might drop her party affiliation, she responded: "I am navigating my way through some very interesting political times. Let's just leave it at that." She later added that she was "not attached to a label" and was "more comfortable with that identity [...] than with an identity […] as a Republican, as a party person", but that she would remain a registered Republican. Murkowski has criticized DOGE, saying she refuses to compromise her integrity by remaining silent. In April 2025, when questioned about the political climate, she said, "We are all afraid", adding, "retaliation is real".

Since Trump regained the presidency in 2025, Murkowski has voted in line with his administration's position in about 85% of major Senate votes. This includes support for most cabinet and judicial nominees, although she has opposed Trump's military operation in Iran.

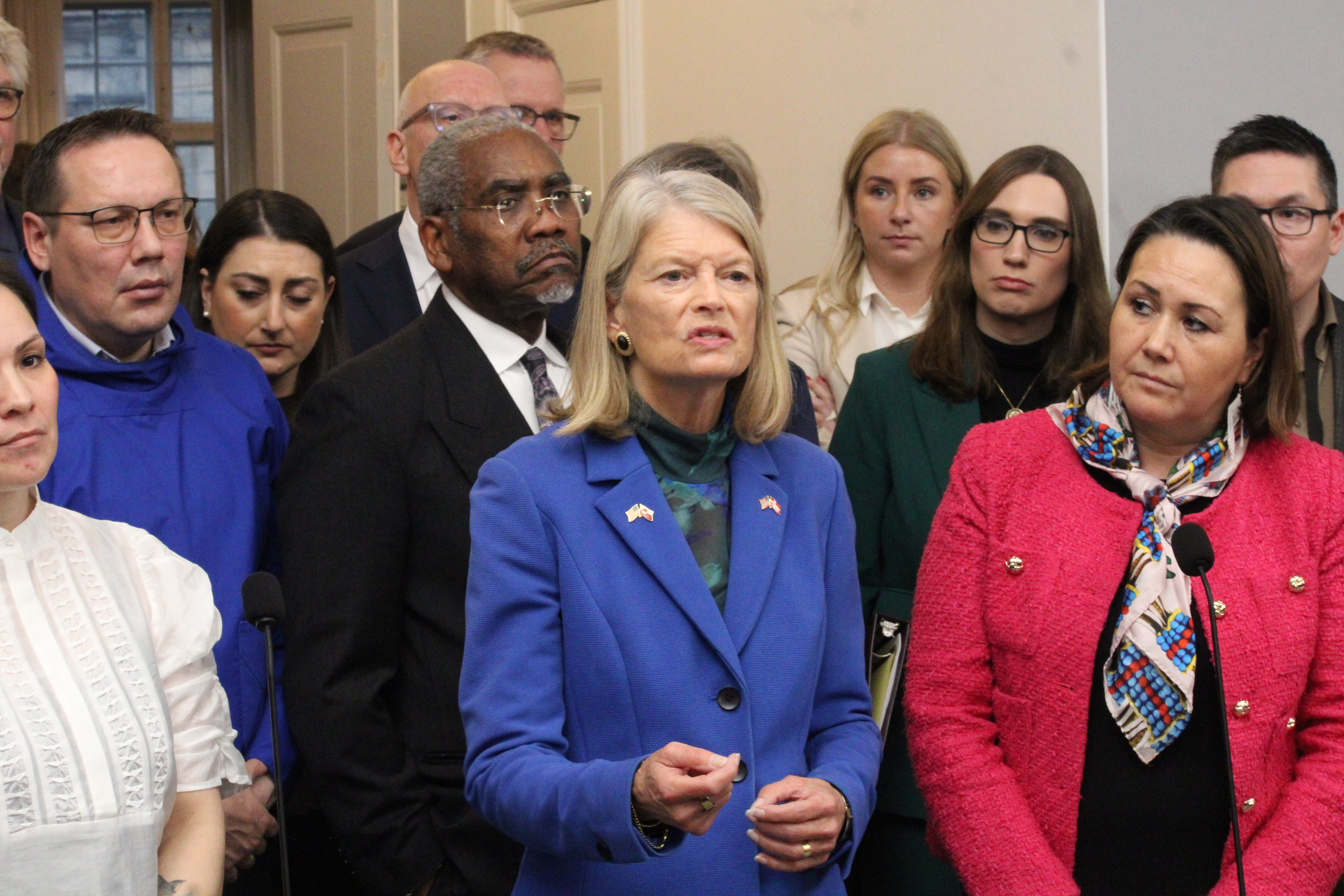
Murkowski speaking during a press conference with Danish, Greenlandic and U.S. politicians at Christiansborg in Copenhagen, January 2026

Murkowski voted for "One Big Beautiful Bill Act" on July 1, 2025, after securing concessions that maintained pork barrel protections for wind and solar projects in Alaska. The Trump administration waived these protections by executive order after the bill was signed into law.

In January 2026, Murkowski visited Denmark in support of the country during the Greenland crisis.

=== 119th United States Congress Committee assignments ===
- Committee on Appropriations
- Committee on Energy and Natural Resources
  - Subcommittee on National Parks
  - Subcommittee on Public Lands, Forests, and Mining
- Committee on Health, Education, Labor, and Pensions
  - Subcommittee on Education and the American Family
  - Subcommittee on Primary Health and Retirement Security
- Committee on Indian Affairs (Chair)

=== Caucus memberships ===
- Senate Oceans Caucus (co-chairwoman)
- Senate Cultural Caucus
- Afterschool Caucuses
- Senate Republican Conference
- Senate Arctic Caucus (chairwoman)
- Congressional Coalition on Adoption

== Personal life ==
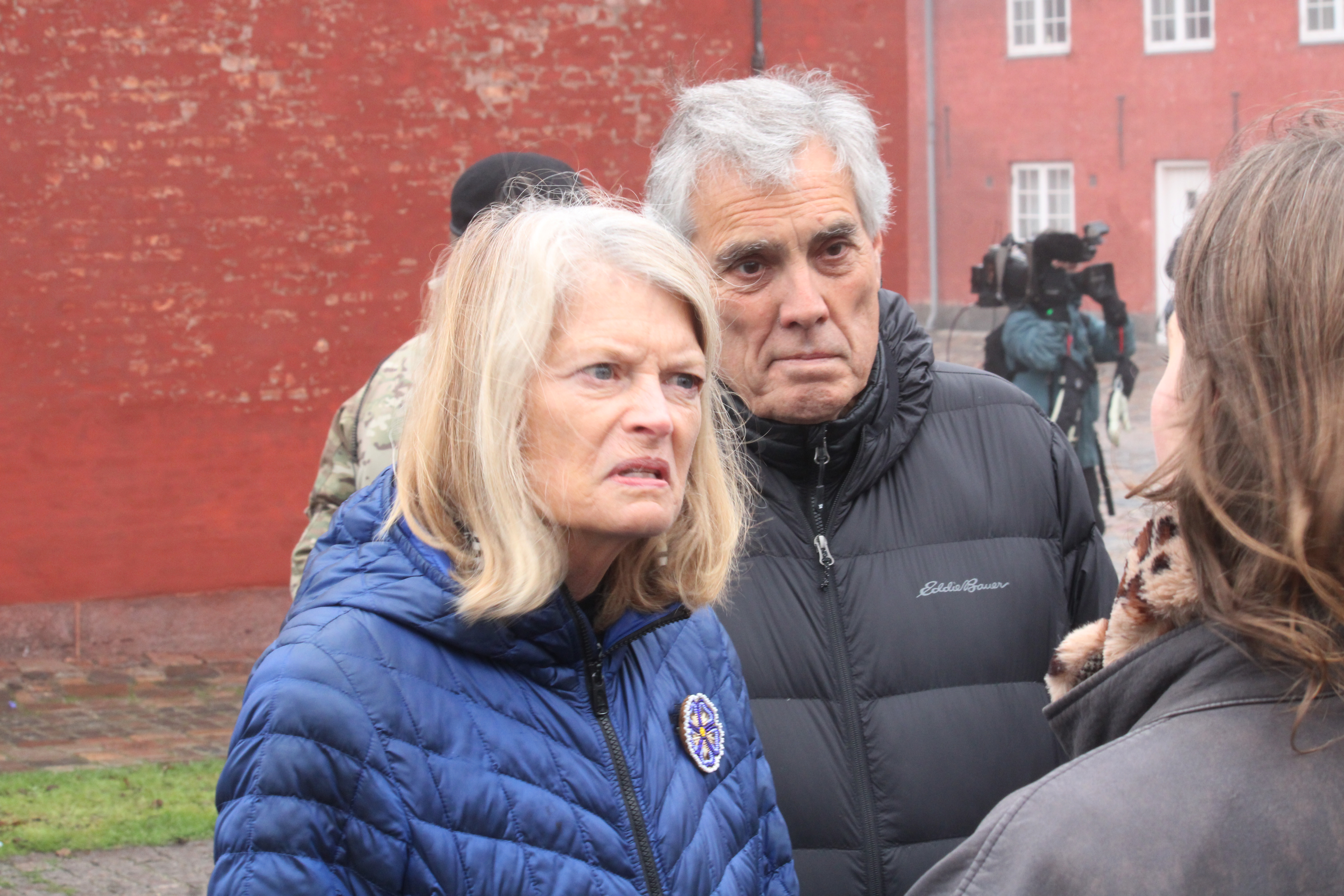
Murkowski and her husband Verne Martell visiting Kastellet in Copenhagen, Denmark, 2026

Murkowski is married to Verne Martell. They have two children. Murkowski is Roman Catholic. As of 2018, according to OpenSecrets.org, Murkowski's net worth was more than $1.4 million. Her sister, Carol, is married to the son of State Senator Arliss Sturgulewski, a former gubernatorial nominee.

=== Property sale controversy ===
In July 2007, Murkowski said she would sell back land she bought from Anchorage businessman Bob Penney, a day after a Washington watchdog group filed a Senate ethics complaint against her alleging that Penney sold the property well below market value. The Anchorage Daily News wrote, "The transaction amounted to an illegal gift worth between $70,000 and $170,000, depending on how the property was valued, according to the complaint by the National Legal and Policy Center." According to the Associated Press, Murkowski bought the land from two developers tied to the Ted Stevens probe.

In 2008, Murkowski amended her Senate financial disclosures for 2004 through 2006, adding income of $60,000 per year from the sale of a property in 2003, and more than $40,000 a year from the sale of her "Alaska Pasta Company" in 2005.

== Electoral history ==
Republican primary for the 1998 Alaska House of Representatives, District 14
Party	Candidate	Votes	%
Republican	Lisa Murkowski	830	65.6%
Republican	Mike Miller	436	34.4%
Total votes		1,266	100%

1998 Alaska House of Representatives, District 14
Party	Candidate	Votes	%
Republican	Lisa Murkowski	2,676	96.5%
Write-in		96	3.5%
Total votes		2,772	100%

Republican primary for the 2000 Alaska House of Representatives, District 14
Party	Candidate	Votes	%
Republican	Lisa Murkowski (incumbent)	368	100%
Total votes		368	100%

2000 Alaska House of Representatives, District 14
Party	Candidate	Votes	%
Republican	Lisa Murkowski (incumbent)	3,828	96.40%
Write-in		145	3.6%
Total votes		3,973	100%

Republican primary for the 2002 Alaska House of Representatives, District 18
Party	Candidate	Votes	%
Republican	Lisa Murkowski	486	53.1%
Republican	Nancy A. Dahlstrom	429	46.9%
Total votes		915	100%

2002 Alaska House of Representatives, District 18
Party	Candidate	Votes	%
Republican	Lisa Murkowski	2,231	93.3%
Write-in		161	6.7%
Total votes		2,392	100%

Republican primary for the 2004 United States Senate election in Alaska
Party	Candidate	Votes	%
Republican	Lisa Murkowski (incumbent)	45,710	58.1%
Republican	Mike Miller	29,313	37.3%
Republican	Wev Shea	2,857	3.6%
Republican	Jim Dore	748	0.9%
Total votes		78,628	100%

2004 United States Senate election in Alaska
Party	Candidate	Votes	%
Republican	Lisa Murkowski (incumbent)	149,446	48.62%
Democratic	Tony Knowles	139,878	45.51%
Independent	Marc J. Millican	8,857	2.88%
Independence	Jerry Sanders	3,765	1.22%
Green	Jim Sykes	3,039	0.99%
Libertarian	Scott A. Kohlhaas	1,237	0.40%
Independent	Ted Gianoutsos	726	0.24%
Total votes		306,948	100%

Republican primary for the 2010 United States Senate election in Alaska
Party	Candidate	Votes	%
Republican	Joe Miller	55,878	50.91%
Republican	Lisa Murkowski (incumbent)	53,872	49.09%
Total votes		109,750	100%

2010 United States Senate election in Alaska
Party	Candidate	Votes	%
Write-In	Lisa Murkowski (incumbent)	101,091	39.49%
Republican	Joe Miller	90,839	35.49%
Democratic	Scott McAdams	60,045	23.46%
Libertarian	David Haase	1,459	0.57%
Independent	Timothy Carter	927	0.36%
Independent	Ted Gianoutsos	458	0.18%
Write-In	Other write-in votes	1,143	0.44%
Invalid or blank votes		2,784	1.08%
Total votes		258,746	100%
Turnout			52.3%

Republican primary for the 2016 United States Senate election in Alaska
Party	Candidate	Votes	%
Republican	Lisa Murkowski	39,545	71.52%
Republican	Bob Lochner	8,480	15.34%
Republican	Paul Kendall	4,272	7.73%
Republican	Thomas Lamb	2,996	5.42%
Total votes		55,293	100%

2016 United States Senate election in Alaska
Party	Candidate	Votes	%
Republican	Lisa Murkowski (incumbent)	138,149	44.36%
Libertarian	Joe Miller	90,825	29.16%
Independent	Margaret Stock	41,194	13.23%
Democratic	Ray Metcalfe	36,200	11.62%
Independent	Breck A. Carter	2,609	0.84%
Independent	Ted Gianoutsos	1,758	0.56%
Write-in		706	0.23%
Invalid or blank votes		5,363	1.69%
Total votes		316,804	100%
Turnout			59.9%

Primary for the 2022 United States Senate election in Alaska
Party	Candidate	Votes	%
Republican	Lisa Murkowski (incumbent)	85,794	45.05%
Republican	Kelly Tshibaka	73,414	38.55%
Democratic	Patricia Chesbro	12,989	6.82%
Republican	Buzz Kelley	4,055	2.13%
Republican	Pat Nolin	2,004	1.05%
Democratic	Edgar Blatchford	1,981	1.04%
Democratic	Ivan R. Taylor	1,897	1.00%
Republican	Sam Merrill	1,529	0.80%
Libertarian	Sean Thorne	1,399	0.73%
Independent	Shoshana Gungurstein	853	0.45%
Independence	Joe Stephens	805	0.42%
Republican	John Schiess	734	0.39%
Independence	Dustin Darden	649	0.34%
Republican	Kendall L. Shorkey	627	0.33%
Republican	Karl Speights	613	0.32%
Independent	Jeremy Keller	405	0.21%
Independent	Sid Hill	274	0.14%
Independent	Huhnkie Lee	238	0.12%
Independent	Dave Darden	198	0.10%
Total votes		190,458	100.0%

2022 United States Senate election in Alaska
Party	Candidate	First Choice			Round 1			Round 2			Round 3	
Party	Candidate	Votes	%	Transfer	Votes	%	Transfer	Votes	%	Transfer	Votes	%
Republican	Lisa Murkowski (incumbent)	113,495	43.37%	+623	114,118	43.39%	+1,641	115,759	44.49%	+20,571	136,330	53.70%
Republican	Kelly Tshibaka	111,480	42.60%	+621	112,101	42.62%	+3,209	115,310	44.32%	+2,224	117,534	46.30%
Democratic	Pat Chesbro	27,145	10.37%	+1,088	28,233	10.73%	+901	29,134	11.20%	−29,134	Eliminated	
Republican	Buzz Kelley (withdrew) (Note: Remained on the ballot because of his withdrawal after the deadline of 64 days ahead of the election.)	7,557	2.89%	+1,018	8,575	3.26%	−8,575	Eliminated				
Write-in		2,028	0.77%	-2,028	Eliminated							
Total votes		261,705			263,027			260,203			253,864	
Blank or inactive ballots					3,770		+2,824	6,594		+6,339	12,933	
Republican hold												

== See also ==
- Arctic Policy of the United States
- Women in the United States Senate

== Notes ==
U.S. Senate
Preceded by Frank Murkowski	U.S. Senator (Class 3) from Alaska; 2002–present Served alongside: Ted Stevens, Mark Begich, Dan Sullivan, Mary Peltola (elect)	Incumbent
Preceded by Craig Thomas	Vice Chair of the Senate Indian Affairs Committee; 2007–2009	Succeeded by John Barrasso
Preceded by Pete Domenici	Ranking Member of the Senate Energy Committee; 2009–2015	Succeeded by Maria Cantwell
Preceded by Mary Landrieu	Chair of the Senate Energy Committee; 2015–2021	Succeeded by Joe Manchin
Preceded by Tom Udall	Vice Chair of the Senate Indian Affairs Committee; 2021–2025	Succeeded by Brian Schatz
Preceded by Brian Schatz	Chair of the Senate Indian Affairs Committee; 2025–present	Incumbent
Party political offices
Preceded by Frank Murkowski	Republican nominee for U.S. Senator from Alaska (Class 3); 2004	Succeeded by Joe Miller
Preceded by Joe Miller	Republican nominee for U.S. Senator from Alaska (Class 3); 2016, 2022; Served alongside: Kelly Tshibaka (2022, endorsed)	Most recent
Preceded by John Thune	Vice Chair of the Senate Republican Conference; 2009–2010	Succeeded by John Barrasso
Order of precedence
Preceded by John Cornyn	Order of precedence of the United States as United States Senator	Succeeded by Sheldon Whitehouse
Preceded by John Cornyn	United States senators by seniority 12th	Succeeded by Sheldon Whitehouse
