= Joe Miller (Alaska politician) =

American attorney and politician (born 1967)

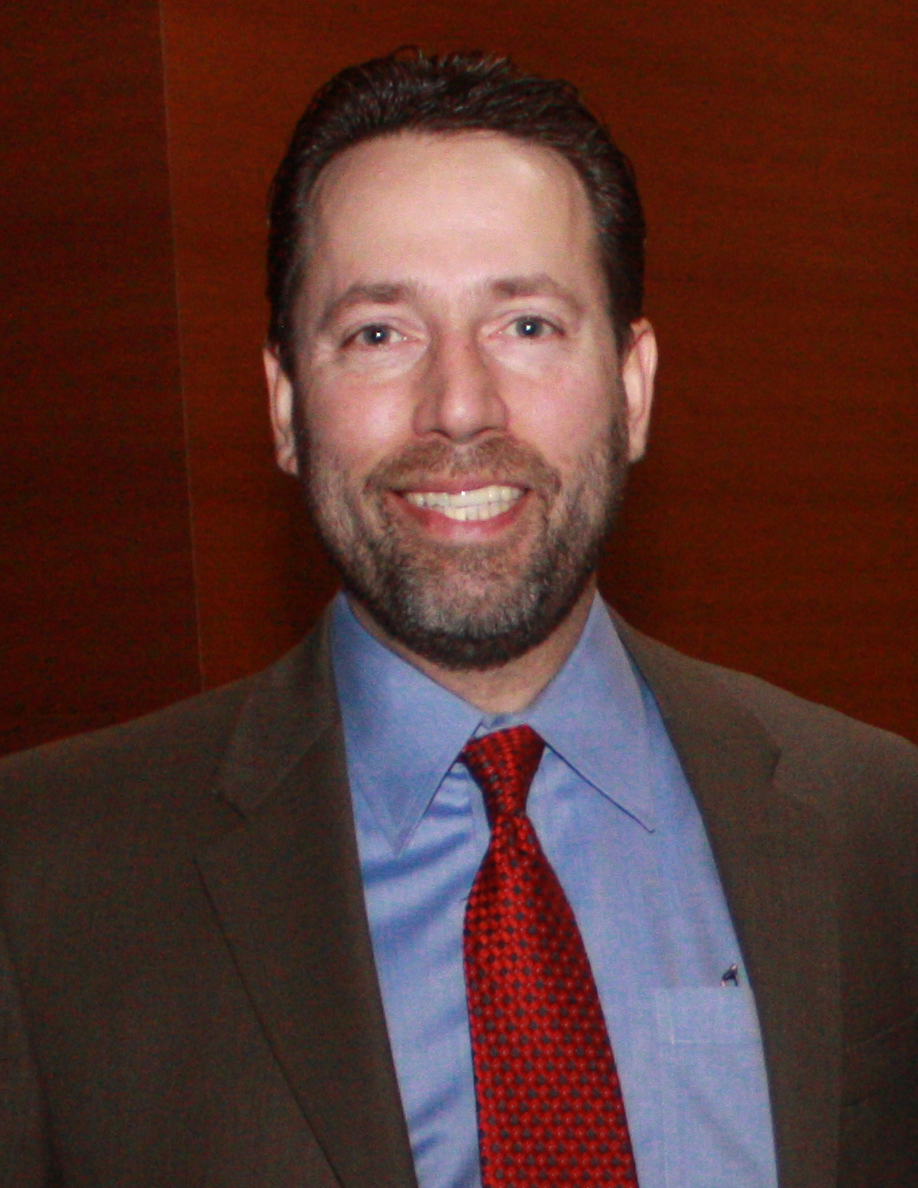
- Born: Joseph Wayne Miller; May 10, 1967 (age 59); Osborne, Kansas, U.S.
- Education: United States Military Academy (BS); Yale University (JD); University of Alaska Fairbanks (MA)
- Political party: Republican
- Other political affiliations: Constitution; Libertarian (2016)
- Spouse: Kathleen Tompkins
- Children: 8
- Military career
- Allegiance: United States
- Branch: United States Army
- Service years: 1989–1992 Army; 1992–1997 Army Reserves
- Rank: Captain
- Units: 1st Infantry Division; United States Army Reserve
- Conflicts: Gulf War
- Awards: Bronze Star

Joseph Wayne Miller (born May 10, 1967) is an American attorney and politician. He is best known as the runner-up in both the 2010 United States Senate election in Alaska and the 2016 United States Senate election in Alaska. A member of the Republican Party, he was defeated by fellow Republican Lisa Murkowski in both races, including in 2010, when Murkowski ran as a write-in candidate after Miller won the Republican primary.

A Kansas native, Miller moved to Alaska with his family in the mid-1990s. He is a graduate of the U.S. Military Academy at West Point and received his Juris Doctor degree from Yale Law School in 1995. Miller is a combat veteran of the 1991 Gulf War. Before running for U.S. Senate, Miller worked as an attorney in private general practice, a local government attorney, and a U.S. magistrate judge.

Miller rose to national prominence as the Republican Party nominee and Tea Party movement favorite in the 2010 U.S. Senate election in Alaska. After defeating incumbent U.S. Senator Lisa Murkowski in the Republican primary, Miller faced Democrat Scott McAdams in the general election. Murkowski remained in the race as a write-in candidate and went on to defeat Miller and McAdams in the general election.

Miller sought the Republican nomination to challenge incumbent Democratic senator Mark Begich in 2014, but was defeated by Dan Sullivan in the Republican primary. In 2016, Libertarian Party primary winner Cean Stevens stepped aside to allow Miller to receive the Alaska Libertarian Party nomination in the U.S. Senate election. Miller once again placed second to Murkowski in the general election, receiving just under 30% of the vote.

== Early life, education, and military career ==
Miller was born and raised in Osborne, Kansas, the son of Sharry and Rex Miller. His father was a minister who owned a Christian book and gift store. He attended elementary school in Salina, Kansas and Salina Central High School, participating in debate, forensics, and student congress, and graduating in 1985.

He has said that growing up during the Vietnam War era made him aware of the military, and eventually led to his enrollment at the United States Military Academy at West Point in 1985. While at West Point, he was a member of the Officer's Christian Fellowship and the Hunting and Fishing and Survival Games clubs. Miller later graduated from Yale Law School with a Juris Doctor degree. At Yale, he was a member of the flagship chapter of the Federalist Society.

Miller served three years of active duty in the United States Army. An armor officer, he served in the 2nd Battalion, 34th Armor Regiment within the 1st Infantry Division at Fort Riley, Kansas. In 1991, Miller deployed to the Persian Gulf War, where he served as a leader of a tank platoon that helped drive Saddam Hussein's army from Kuwait. His superiors called him "a true warrior leader tested under fire" and he received a Bronze Star for leadership in combat. He has a service-connected hearing loss. He was honorably discharged on September 1, 1992, during a time when the U.S. was downsizing its military. He then served in the U.S. Army Reserve until his honorable discharge on May 30, 1997.

In 2008, Miller earned a master's degree in Resource and Applied Economics from the University of Alaska Fairbanks.

== Legal career ==
After law school, Miller moved to Alaska in 1995 and accepted a position with Condon Partnow & Sharrock, a law firm in Anchorage.

Miller was appointed a state court magistrate for the remote village of Tok, as well as a superior court master for the Alaska's Fourth Judicial District in 1998. During his U.S. Senate campaign, Miller, who had said federal entitlement programs are unconstitutional, was criticized for having received federal assistance from Medicaid and a federally funded Alaska health care program for low income families at this time of his life. His campaign responded that Miller had not received the aid since 2002. Miller said he did not oppose the state program itself, but did oppose its expansion. In 2002, after moving to Fairbanks, Miller was appointed an acting state District Court judge for several months.

From 2002 to 2004, Miller served as a part-time U.S. magistrate judge, employing his wife for part of that time as a clerical assistant. In 2010, while Miller was being scrutinized by the media, allegations were made that he had violated nepotism rules by hiring his wife, and he was criticized because she collected unemployment compensation after being forced to quit the job. Miller responded that the nepotism rules were different at the time she was hired, and the court verified that he initially had clearance from his superiors to employ her. Miller's former supervising judge on the federal court later criticized Miller for quitting the federal magistrate job without notice in 2004, saying it left Fairbanks without a judicial officer for many months, and gave him a "negative opinion" of Miller.

Miller spent seven years as a part-time assistant attorney for the Fairbanks North Star Borough (2002–2009) while maintaining a private law practice from which he earned the bulk of his income. One of his major cases as borough assistant attorney involved successfully defending the borough's levy of a tax increase on the companies that own the Trans-Alaska Pipeline. In 2008, he misused the borough's computers for political purposes (to pad a poll as part of his campaign for Republican Party state chair). He was disciplined for his actions and for lying about them when first confronted by his superiors, facts that became public knowledge during the last ten days of the 2010 Senate campaign. His supervisor said that Miller was under stress at the time. He resigned from the assistant attorney post in September 2009 over disputes involving a possible conflict of interest in a case and his request for time off under the Family and Medical Leave Act. As of early December 2010, the borough was considering pursuing charges against Miller for deleting more than 15,000 e-mails in the days following his resignation. Miller's attorney responded that it was routine to delete non-essential e-mails and that the borough's inquiries were an attempt to threaten a candidate and illegally interfere with an election. The Alaska Republican Party chair, Randy Ruedrich, said the borough was engaging in "cheap drama".

== Political career ==
=== Early endeavors ===
In 2004 Miller ran for a seat in the Alaska House of Representatives, winning the Republican primary. He ran as a moderate Republican in the general election, but lost to Democratic incumbent David Guttenberg.

In 2008, while serving as Interior regional chairman of the Alaska Republican Party, he unsuccessfully tried to oust Randy Ruedrich as the state Republican Party chairman. The Alaska Dispatch described Miller's effort as part of a power struggle between "the old guard versus the new Palin-led faction", reporting that Miller arrived at the state Republican Party convention accompanied by a security detail of four bodyguards. Miller resigned his regional chairmanship and temporarily quit the GOP the day after the 2008 convention.

=== 2010 U.S. Senate campaign ===
Joe Miller for Senate 2010
- Campaign: U.S. Senator from Alaska
- Candidate: Joe Miller
- Affiliation: Republican Party
- Status: Defeated
- Headquarters: Fairbanks, Alaska, U.S.

==== Republican primary ====
Miller announced his candidacy in April 2010, saying that the U.S. republic needed to be defended from a "head-long plunge into socialism and more government control". His chief opponent for the Republican nomination was incumbent U.S. Senator Murkowski. He quickly picked up endorsements from current and former Alaska politicians including State Senators Fred Dyson and John Coghill, and State Representative Tammie Wilson. Former governor Sarah Palin endorsed Miller's candidacy in early June 2010. The Tea Party Express began funding TV, radio, and direct mail ads on Miller's behalf shortly after, spending $600,000 on what the Los Angeles Times called a "blitz" of "attack ads" against Murkowski. Miller said he spent approximately $100,000 of his own funds on the primary campaign. The New York Times described Murkowski as an establishment candidate and called Miller a "Tea Party upstart", and the race was viewed as a test of the power of the Tea Party movement.

The initial results showed Murkowski trailing Miller, 51–49%, with absentee ballots yet to be tallied. After the first round of absentee ballots was counted on August 31, Murkowski conceded, saying that she did not believe that Miller's lead could be overcome in the next round of absentee vote counting. Miller received 55,878 votes to Murkowski's 53,872.

==== General election ====
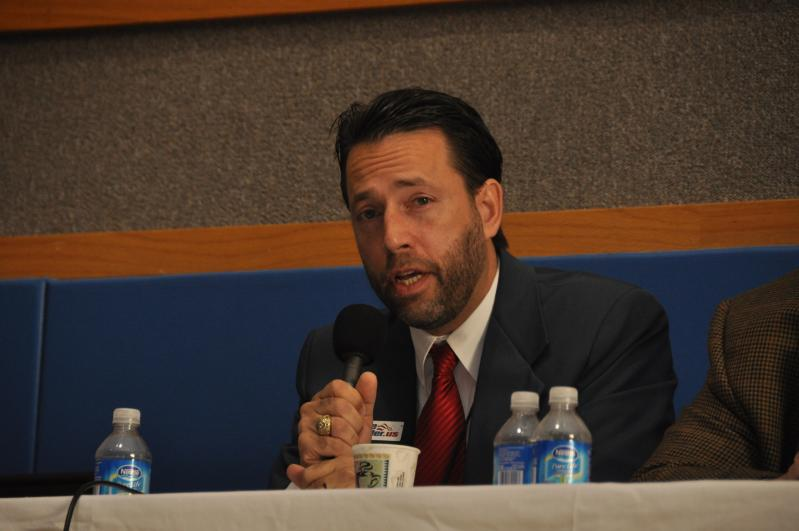
Joe Miller campaigning in September 2010

Miller faced two candidates in the general election: Democrat Scott McAdams and Republican incumbent Lisa Murkowski, who announced a write-in campaign on September 17.

After securing the Republican Party nomination, Miller received backing from the state Republican Party, Senator Jim DeMint, and the National Republican Senatorial Committee. Various groups from outside Alaska endorsed Miller and contributed large sums of money to his general election campaign, including the Tea Party Express, the Safari Club International, and the National Right to Life Committee. Alaska's only representative in the House, Republican Don Young, declined to endorse either Murkowski or Miller. Sarah Palin appeared at a campaign rally with Miller for the first time in late October 2010.

During his general election campaign, Miller said he supported sharp reductions in federal spending and stronger states' rights. He told the Washington D.C. newspaper The Hill that the nation's problems were caused by activist judges who had permitted government growth and allowed dependency and "the entitlement state to grab hold".

Alaskan media criticized Miller for a 1995 sworn application in which he claimed to be indigent and a one-year continuous resident of Alaska to obtain a hunting and fishing license for $5, a $295 discount from the non-resident fee. The campaign responded that Miller had been a full-time student the previous year living on student loans, and that he was an Alaska resident when he purchased the license.

The Democratic National Committee and other Democrats began painting him as a far right candidate. Miller told the media that he wanted to serve on the Senate Judiciary and Armed Services committees.

Following a mid-October leak of information about his work record as a borough attorney, Miller held a news conference telling reporters that he was drawing a line in the sand and would not answer any more questions about his past.

Miller received national press attention after campaign security guards handcuffed and made a 30-minute private arrest of a journalist following a town hall campaign event in an Anchorage public school on October 17, 2010. Bill Fulton, the owner of the unlicensed security firm said the journalist, Tony Hopfinger, was trespassing at a private event and had assaulted a Miller supporter by shoving him. Fulton was subsequently named as the federal informant who supplied weapons to a radical accused of plotting the deaths of officials in Fairbanks. The Anchorage Daily News described the event as public, and a school district spokesperson noted that the hallway where the arrest took place was a public area. Hopfinger said he had been trying to ask Miller whether he had been disciplined while working as a local government lawyer, when he was suddenly surrounded by guards and supporters, and bumped or shoved against one of them. No charges were filed against anyone in relation to the incident. Miller responded that Hopfinger's actions were "beyond the pale" because he had followed Miller into the men's room. Hopfinger said that he asked no questions until after the townhall event when both men were back in the hallway.

After the private arrest incident, Miller granted interviews and discussed certain issues regarding his past employment with national news outlets; he had previously refused to discuss the same issues with the Alaskan media. In an October 18, 2010 interview with CNN's John King, Miller admitted that he had been disciplined for an ethics violation while serving as an assistant attorney for the Fairbanks North Star Borough; he characterized the offense as "petty". During an October 25 debate (which occurred one day after a judge had ordered the release of Miller's personnel files relating to the ethics violation), Miller said that he had used government-owned computers to engage in private polling activity during his lunch hour. Miller added that he had been docked three days' pay due to his conduct. The information about Miller's discipline and suspension that Hopfinger was attempting to ask Miller about was released by the borough on October 26 following legal action by multiple media outlets. Miller's personnel file showed that he used coworkers' computers to vote multiple times in an online poll. Miller then cleared the caches on his coworkers' computers in an attempt to hide what he had done; in so doing; he deleted those coworkers' saved websites and passwords. In a memo to his supervisor, Miller said: "'I lied about accessing all of the computers. I then admitted about accessing the computers, but lied about what I was doing. Finally, I admitted what I did... I acknowledge that my access to others' computers was wrong, participating in the poll was wrong, lying was wrong, and there is absolutely no excuse for any of it'". Miller had been suspended from his job for three days as a result of his conduct. On October 27, The Guardian reported that Sarah Palin and other well-known conservatives were scheduled to "rush to the aid of the beleaguered Tea Party-backed candidate for the US Senate, Joe Miller, after newly released documents reveal he lied about a computer tampering scandal". The Guardian added that "the row has created alarm about the election chances of Miller".

In late October 2010, Sarah Palin claimed on Fox News Channel that the Anchorage CBS-TV affiliate, KTVA, had been conspiring to make up stories about Miller and that the campaign had proof. KTVA personnel were alleged to have failed to hang up a phone after leaving a message for Miller's campaign spokesman, resulting in a subsequent conversation being recorded to voicemail in which KTVA personnel laughingly considering tweeting about chaos at a Miller rally and reporting that sex offenders were in attendance. The station's general manager initially took no action and denied the accusations published on Breitbart, claiming the discussion was speculation on how others might attempt to influence the campaign; two producers alleged to be involved were later fired, and two newscasts were cancelled to hold a staff meeting discussing ethics in journalism.

During the write-in count, Alaska election officials said they were counting write-in ballots with misspellings if the names written in were phonetic to Murkowski, claiming that Alaska case law supports this practice. The Miller campaign had observers present who challenged ballots which misspelled "Murkowski", or which included the word "Republican" next to Murkowski's name. The Anchorage Daily News noted on November 11 that the bulk of the challenged ballots contained misspellings but examples were not hard to find of challenged ballots that appeared to be "spelled accurately and looked to be filled out properly".

After several days of counting, the Division of Elections showed Murkowski with a lead of some 1,700 votes over Miller, with about 8,000 write-in votes yet to be counted, and a trend of counting 97 percent of the write-ins as for Murkowski. Murkowski's campaign shied away from declaring a victory before the count was finished. As of November 17, (the last day of the hand count), the Division of Elections showed Murkowski having a lead of over 10,000 votes, meaning that even if all the 8,000 challenged ballots were discounted, Murkowski would still lead by about 2,200 votes. The Miller campaign then demanded a hand recount of the entire election, claiming that as Murkowski's votes were all verified by visual inspection, Miller should get the same opportunity. The Division of Election officials responded that any recount of non-write-in votes would not be done by hand, but would be done using optical scanners.

Miller filed a federal lawsuit on November 9, 2010, seeking to have write-in ballots that contained spelling and other errors from being counted toward Murkowski's total and a seeking preliminary injunction to prevent the counting of the write-in votes from even beginning. He claimed that he had a federal case because State election officials were violating the Elections Clause of the U.S. Constitution and the Equal Protection Clause of the 14th Amendment by using a voter intent standard that allowed misspelled write-in votes to count. The federal court allowed the counting to proceed as the challenged ballots were segregated from the others and could be re-examined later, if necessary. After hearing motions and arguments from both sides, the federal court abstained from hearing the case, ruling that the dispute could be resolved by the State courts by reference to State law. The federal court kept the case in its docket in the event that federal issues still remained after the State courts' determination. The federal court also put a halt to the certification of the election pending rulings on Miller's lawsuits. Miller then filed suit in State court, repeating the claims he had previously made, and adding allegations of vote fraud and bias.

On December 10, the Alaska Superior Court rejected all of Miller's claims as contrary to State statute and case law, and said the fraud claims were unsubstantiated. Miller then appealed the Superior Court ruling to the Alaska Supreme Court, citing a provision in the Alaska election statute that says there shall be "no exceptions" to the rules for counting ballots, and that therefore, all ballots with misspellings or other deviations should be thrown out. After oral arguments were heard on December 17, on December 22, the Alaska Supreme Court upheld the lower court's ruling dismissing Miller's claims. On December 26, Miller announced that he would be withdrawing his opposition for Murkowski's Senate certification, but would continue pursuing his federal case.

On December 30, 2010, Alaska state officials certified Murkowski as the winner of the general election, making her the first U.S. Senate candidate to win election via write-in since Strom Thurmond in 1954. Miller conceded the race on December 31.

In June 2011, a judge found that Miller's lawsuit was aimed at winning the election and not in the interest of upholding the state constitution as Miller had claimed. He was ordered to compensate the State of Alaska approximately $18,000 for legal fees incurred by the State.

=== 2014 U.S. Senate campaign ===
Miller ran in the 2014 U.S. Senate election as a Republican. A late-race endorsement of Miller by former governor Sarah Palin did not yield a win, as former Alaska Attorney General and Commissioner of Natural Resources Daniel S. Sullivan won the Republican primary on August 19, 2014. Sullivan received 40% of the vote, having vastly outspent Miller (who gathered 32%) and Lieutenant Governor Mead Treadwell (25%) combined.

=== 2016 U.S. Senate campaign ===
After Cean Stevens, the winner of the Libertarian primary, stepped aside in the 2016 U.S. Senate election, Miller received the Libertarian nomination in order to again challenge incumbent Republican senator Lisa Murkowski. Miller said he would not support Gary Johnson, the Libertarian presidential nominee, and would instead vote for Republican candidate Donald Trump. Miller's positions diverged from the Libertarian national platform; he opposed abortion and same-sex marriage. Miller lost to Murkowski once more, taking 29% of the vote and finishing second.

=== Political positions ===
Miller opposes federal aid programs such as federal farm subsidies, the federal minimum wage, and unemployment benefits.

He would eliminate the U.S. Department of Education.

Miller supports a repeal of the Seventeenth Amendment to the United States Constitution, which would return the election of U.S. Senators to the state legislatures.

Miller is in favor of privatizing (or "personalizing") Social Security and Medicare for younger workers. He would remove the federal government as the social security provider, placing the power of whether or not to provide similar programs in the hands of the states.

Miller has said that scientific evidence for global warming is "dubious at best".

Miller is opposed to abortion, including in cases of rape and incest, with the only exception being when the mother's life is in danger.

Miller supports the death penalty.

Miller stated at a town hall meeting that he believed East Germany was an example of a nation taking effective measures to control the flow of people across a border. Miller believes illegal immigration is a "critically important" issue, citing his belief of its negative economic effects on health care, education and employment. Miller is opposed to amnesty for undocumented immigrants, and supports increased border security as well as the deportation of those who come into contact with law enforcement officials. Miller supports efforts to enforce stricter immigration law on the state level, such as in Arizona.

== Personal life ==
Miller is married. He is the father of six children and the stepfather of two.

Party political offices
Preceded by Lisa Murkowski	Republican nominee for U.S. Senator from Alaska (Class 3); 2010	Succeeded by Lisa Murkowski
Preceded by David Haase	Libertarian nominee for U.S. Senator from Alaska (Class 3); 2016	Most recent
