= Ray Metcalfe =

American politician

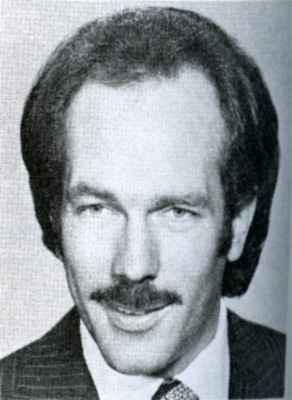
- Metcalfe in 1979

Member of the Alaska House of Representatives from the 11th district
- In office January 15, 1979 – January 17, 1983 Serving with Joyce Munson (1979–1981), Bernard Bylsma (1981–1983)
- Preceded by: Kris Lethis
- Succeeded by: Mitchell Abood

Personal details
- Born: August 29, 1950 (age 76) Crow Indian Reservation, Montana, U.S.
- Party: Republican (before 1986); Republican Moderate (1986–2006); Democratic (2006–present)

Ray Metcalfe (born August 29, 1950) is an American politician and political activist from Alaska. Metcalfe has served in the Alaska House of Representatives as a Republican between 1979 and 1983, been active as an activist with the Republican Moderate Party founded by himself, and later became a Democrat, running unsuccessfully for the United States Senate in 2016.

== Personal life ==
Ray Metcalfe was born on the Crow Indian Reservation in Montana, where he lived until he left home at the age of 15. He spent the next few years hitchhiking around the country, attending high schools in multiple cities and states until graduating from Billings Senior High School in Billings, Montana in 1969. He then hitchhiked to Alaska, arriving June 5, 1969 with a bedroll, a backpack and $52.00 in his pocket.

His life in Alaska alternated between Alaska's oil fields and college, studying business and history until he opened Metcalfe Real Estate Company in 1976, which he operates to this day.

== Political career ==
Metcalfe was twice elected to the Alaska House of Representatives as a Republican. He formed the Republican Moderate Party of Alaska in 1986, to oppose the religious right who he felt had invaded and taken over the Republican Party, and ran for the Alaska House again attempting to beat the incumbent Republican he had lost his former seat to in 1982. Shortly after Metcalfe formed the RMP, the leaders of the Republican Party sued him for forming a group using the term "Republican" without their permission. Metcalfe won in Superior Court and the Republican Party did not appeal. The Superior Court had declared Metcalfe to be a "Public Litigant," "litigating in the public interest in defense of free speech for all." Consequently, under Alaska's court rules, the new leaders of the Republican Party were ordered to pay all Metcalfe's attorney fees. His political runs for the state House and the governor's office were unsuccessful but he received over 6% of the vote in the 1998 gubernatorial election, when the Republican vote had been split between three unsuccessful Republican candidates.

In 2006, Metcalfe ran as a Democrat for the sole U.S. House seat from Alaska, coming in second to Diane E. Benson by receiving 34% of the vote in the Democratic primary. In 2008 the Republican Moderate Party lost its party status and remained as a political group, while the Citizens For Ethical Government Inc., a non profit political watchdog group, was created. Metcalfe again declared he was running as a Democrat, this time for the US Senate seat held by Ted Stevens, but he lost in the 2008 Democratic primary. In 2016, Metcalfe lost his bid to become regional Co-Chair of the Anchorage branch of the Alaska Democratic Party to Joshua Spring by a two to one margin.

In the August 16, 2016 primary, Metcalfe won the Democratic nomination to oppose Republican U.S. Senator Lisa Murkowski. On November 8, 2016 he placed fourth in the general election behind Murkowski (44%), Libertarian Joe Miller (30%), and Independent Margaret Stock (14%). Metcalfe received 11% of the vote.

In 2020, Metcalfe sought the Republican nomination for district M in the Alaska Senate. He received approximately 24% of the vote, placing second behind incumbent Josh Revak.

== See also ==
- United States Senate election in Alaska, 2008
- United States Senate election in Alaska, 2016

Party political offices
Preceded by Scott McAdams	Democratic nominee for U.S. Senator from Alaska (Class 3); 2016	Succeeded by Pat Chesbro
