= Military Accessions Vital to National Interest =

Recruitment program by the United States Department of Defense

Military Accessions Vital to the National Interest (MAVNI) was a recruitment program by the United States Department of Defense, through which legal non-immigrants (not citizens or legal permanent residents of the United States) with certain critical skills are recruited into the US Armed Forces. Certain health care professionals and experts in certain languages relevant to the US military (e.g. Pashto and Persian, due to the war in Afghanistan) meet eligibility requirements for recruitment through this program. Soldiers belonging to the enlisted rank, and recruited through this program, become citizens of the United States, usually at the end of their Basic Combat Training (BCT).

== History ==
MAVNI was spearheaded by immigration attorney Margaret Stock, a former U.S. Army Reserve officer and West Point professor. The program started in 2008 under the George W. Bush administration as a one-year pilot program with a cap of 1000 recruits. The program was suspended following the 2009 Fort Hood shooting and a revision of Army vetting procedures, before being resumed in 2012 with the new vetting procedure. In October 2014, people belonging to the Deferred Action for Childhood Arrivals (DACA) category became possibly eligible for the MAVNI program. In December 2014, the program was extended until 2016 with a raised cap of 5000 recruits. Enlistments are permitted for both active-duty and reserve assignments, but not in the National Guard.

As of December 2016, MAVNI is under review and closed indefinitely to new recruits. Several lawsuits happened due to the Defense Department allegedly attempting to pressure out existing MAVNI service members, including outright discharging 40 members in July 2018 for failing new background checks. These new background checks were criticized as being shoddy and relying on trivial information such as a MAVNI member having parents living in a foreign country as a reason to reject the check due to "foreign ties". The softer methods included an "administrative discharge" of simply not sending soldiers to required training or giving them new contracts. This process of discharging MAVNI members itself was suspended on July 20, 2018, one month later. A related legal dispute ended in February 2019 with U.S. District Judge Thomas Zilly of the Western District of Washington ordering the Defense Department to stop unequal treatment of soldiers in the program, such as by forcing them to submit to "continuous monitoring" background checks without any case-by-case reason, when other soldiers are not subject to similar restrictions. MAVNI's sudden suspension left over 4,000 immigrant recruits in limbo. As of 2023, many of the MAVNI recruits are still waiting in limbo.

== Impact ==
The MAVNI program has several notable recruiting successes; for example, the program enlisted Haseeb Mohammed, the U.S. Army Soldier of the Year for 2022 and Augustus Maiyo, the winner of the 2012 Marine Corps Marathon. MAVNI recruits of the Army have a lower attrition rate than other recruits, and many hold higher educational credentials than other enlistees. Around 30% of MAVNI recruits were assigned to Special Operations units due to their language abilities, which facilitate operations in territories with few English speakers. Some MAVNI recruits have also written about their experiences in the program.

With the suspension of MAVNI, the US Defense Department has weakened its requirements on would-be native citizens in an attempt to fill up missing headcount, such as allowing more waivers for people with criminal backgrounds or histories of illegal drug use to join the military.
