= 1996 United States Senate election in Alaska =

- November 5, 1996
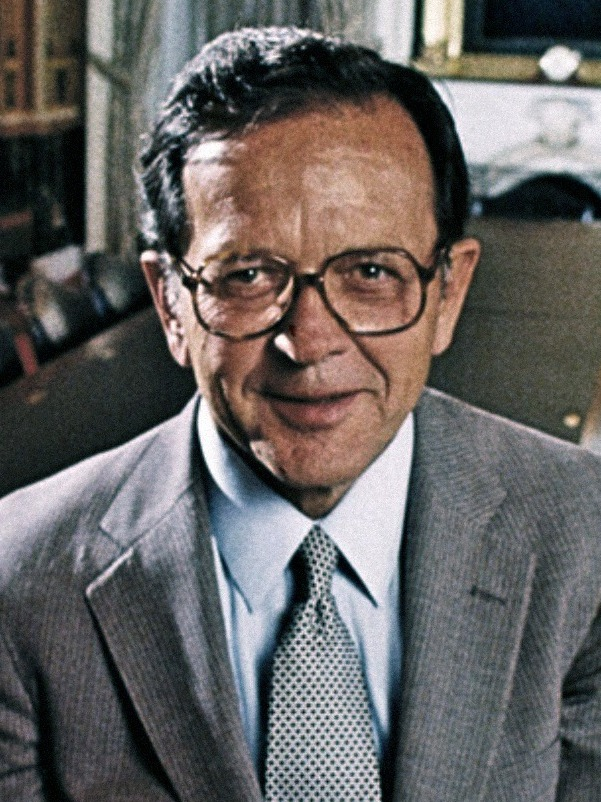

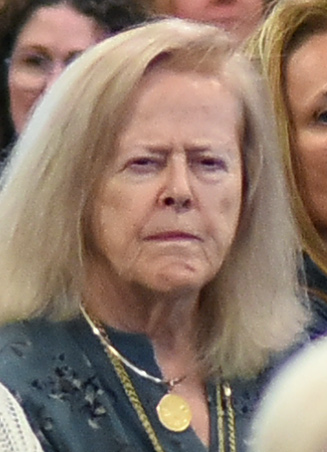
Nominee	Ted Stevens	Jed Whittaker	Theresa Obermeyer
Party	Republican	Green	Democratic
Popular vote	177,893	29,037	23,977
Percentage	76.71%	12.52%	10.34%
- Stevens: 50–60% 60–70% 70–80% 80–90%
U.S. senator before election
Ted Stevens
Republican
Elected U.S. Senator
Ted Stevens
Republican

The 1996 United States Senate election in Alaska was held on November 5, 1996. Incumbent Republican United States Senator Ted Stevens ran for re-election to a sixth term (a fifth full term) in the United States Senate. Stevens faced off against Democratic nominee Theresa Obermeyer, a former member of the Anchorage School Board, and Green Party nominee Jed Whittaker, a commercial fisherman. Stevens won in a landslide.

== Open primary ==
=== Candidates ===
==== Democratic ====
- Michael Beasley, perennial candidate
- Henry J. Blake Jr.
- Lawrence Freiberger, former congressional candidate
- Robert Alan Gigler
- Theresa Obermeyer, former Anchorage School Board member
- Joseph A. Sonneman, perennial candidate
- Frank Vondersaar, perennial candidate

==== Republican ====
- Ted Stevens, incumbent United States Senator since 1968
- David Cuddy, former Alaska State Representative
- Charles E. McKee

==== Green ====
- Jed Whittaker, commercial fisherman, Republican candidate in 1992

=== Results ===
Open primary results
Party	Candidate	Votes	%
Republican	Ted Stevens (incumbent)	71,043	58.87%
Republican	Dave W. Cuddy	32,994	27.34%
Democratic	Theresa Obermeyer	4,072	3.37%
Green	Jed Whittaker	3,751	3.11%
Democratic	Joseph A. Sonneman	2,643	2.19%
Democratic	Michael Beasley	1,968	1.63%
Democratic	Henry J. Blake Jr.	1,157	0.96%
Democratic	Lawrence Freiberger	921	0.76%
Republican	Charles E. McKee	842	0.70%
Democratic	Frank Vondersaar	655	0.54%
Democratic	Robert Alan Gigler	631	0.52%
Total votes		138,492	100.00%

== General election ==
=== Campaign ===
The race drew national attention for Obermeyer's erratic behavior: she blamed Stevens for her husband's failure to pass the bar exam twenty-one times, and contended that Stevens had passed the bar by fraud. She "trailed" him to campaign events, frequently wearing a prisoner's outfit and once dragging a ball and chain behind her. In June and July 1996, she served a sentence of 30 days in prison for disorderly conduct because of her role in a disturbance at a federal courthouse, while on probation for a 1994 conviction of disorderly conduct for instigating another disturbance at the same courthouse. Obermeyer attracted public attention, and possibly sympathy, during the campaign when, after serving seven days of her sentence in Alaska state prison, she was moved in the middle of the night to a Portland, Oregon county jail, and after a week there, she was moved to a federal prison in Dublin, California; her husband and attorney each complained about the moves, and a Federal prison official acknowledged that they were unusual. During the televised debate before the general election, after discussing diseases of the brain, Stevens earnestly said to his opponent, "I think you need help, Mrs. Obermeyer," a response described fourteen years later in The Anchorage Daily News as one that "has become, it is safe to say, legendary."

The televised primary election debates on August 21, 1996, also drew national attention for the unusual cast of characters seeking to oppose Stevens, particularly the seven candidates on the Democratic side. A column on the national PoliticsNow website, headlined "Alaska Displays the Scary Side of Democracy," described the debate as "what would happen if the Addams Family appeared on Meet the Press," leading to nationwide sales by public TV station KAKM of a record number of copies of the debate video. Anchorage Daily News columnist Mike Doogan described the debate as "what would happen if the folks from Jabba the Hutt's headquarters dropped by the Mad Hatter's tea party."

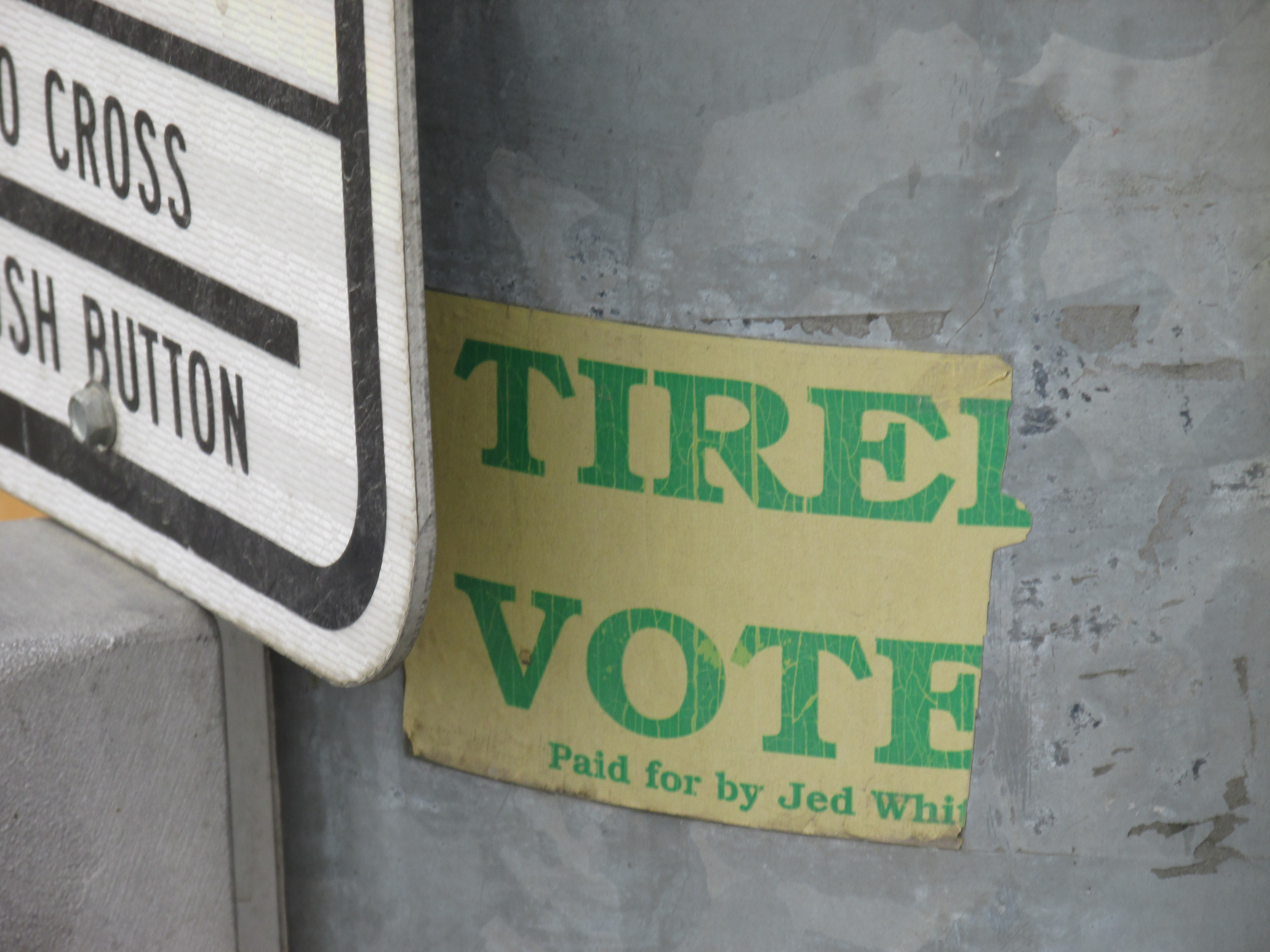
Remnant of Whittaker's campaign bumper sticker, photographed on a light pole on South Cushman Street in Fairbanks in 2014. The bumper sticker read "Tired of Ted? Vote for Jed!".

=== Results ===
In the general election, Stevens was re-elected in an overwhelming landslide, and Whittaker finished ahead of Obermeyer.

1996 United States Senate election in Alaska
Party	Candidate	Votes	%	±%
Republican	Ted Stevens (incumbent)	177,893	76.71%	+10.48%
Green	Jed Whittaker	29,037	12.52%	
Democratic	Theresa Obermeyer	23,977	10.34%	−21.85%
Write-ins		1,009	0.44%	
Majority		148,856	64.19%	+30.15%
Turnout		231,916		
Republican hold		Swing		

== See also ==
- 1996 United States Senate elections
