= 2010 United States Senate election in Alaska =

- November 2, 2010
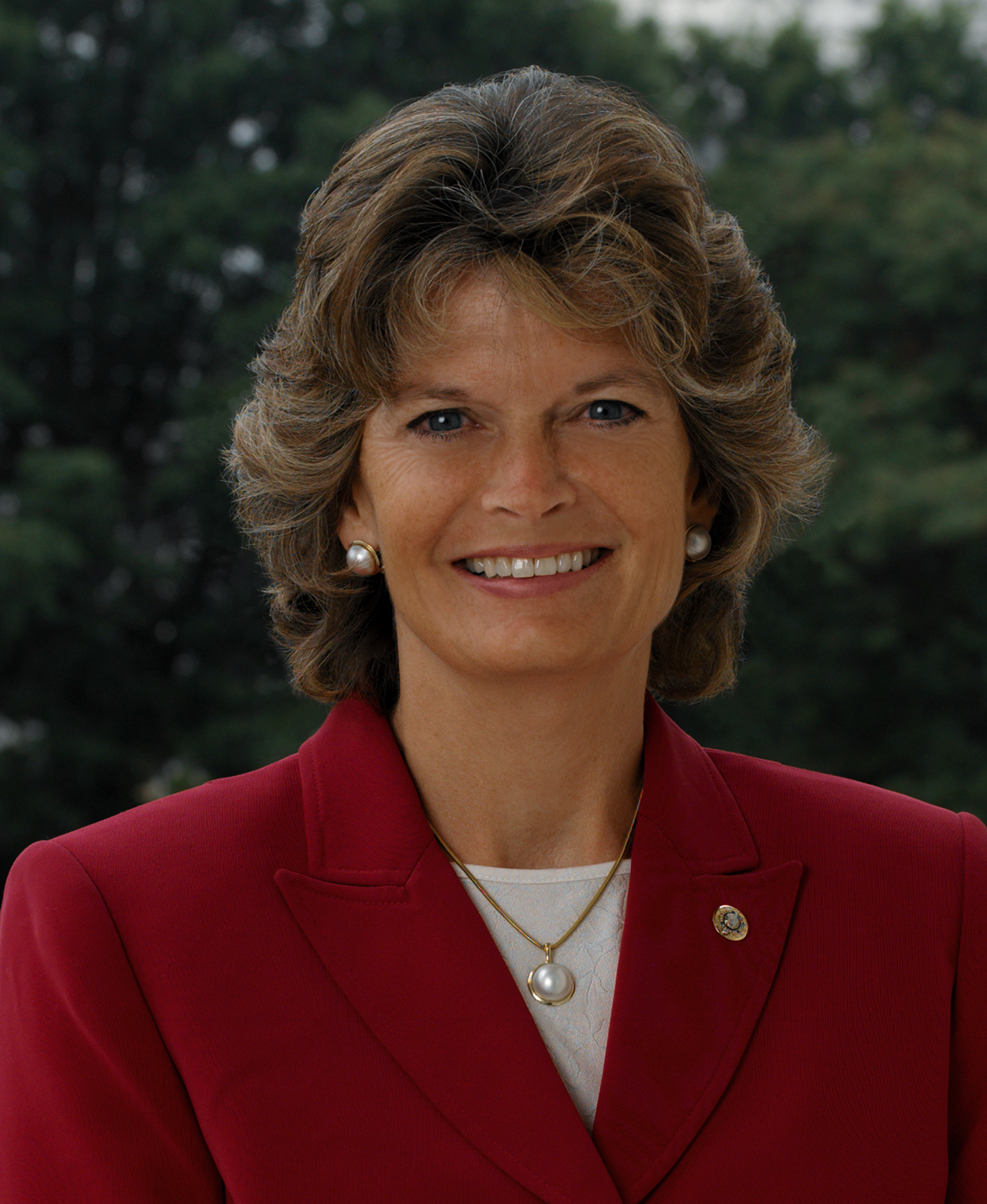

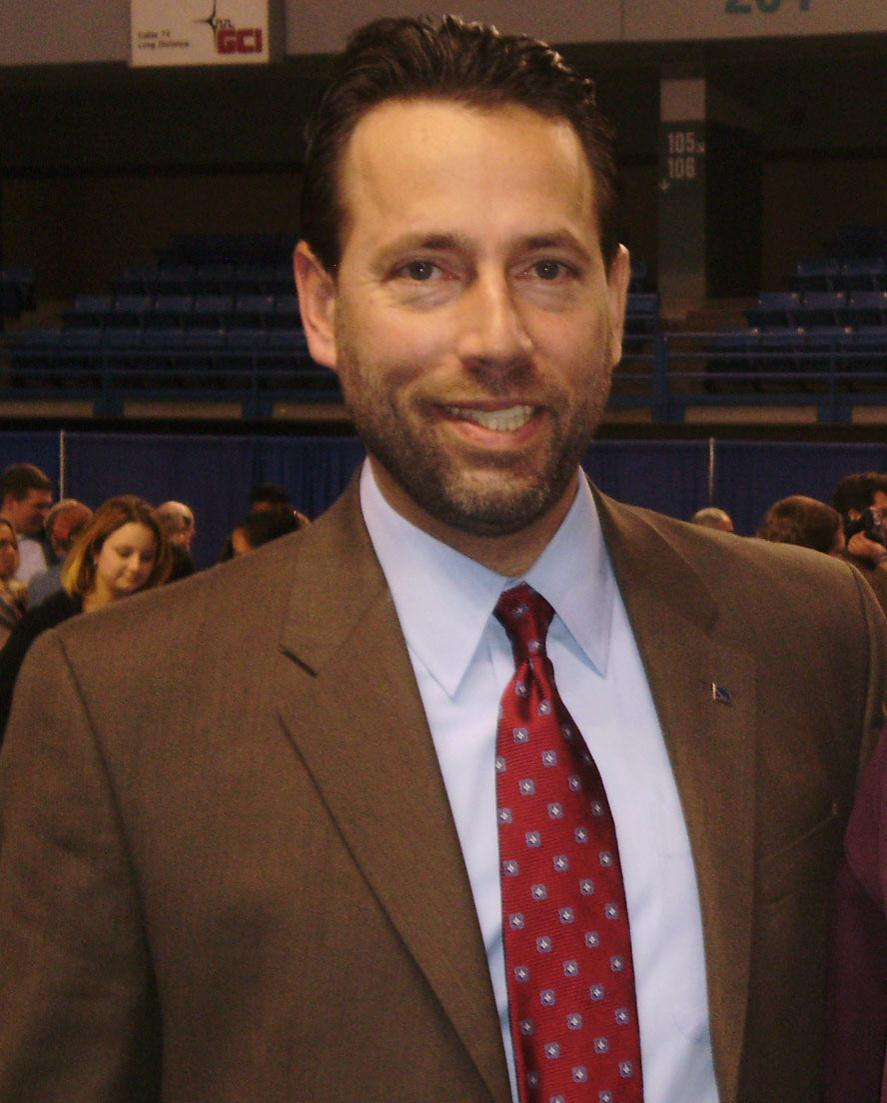

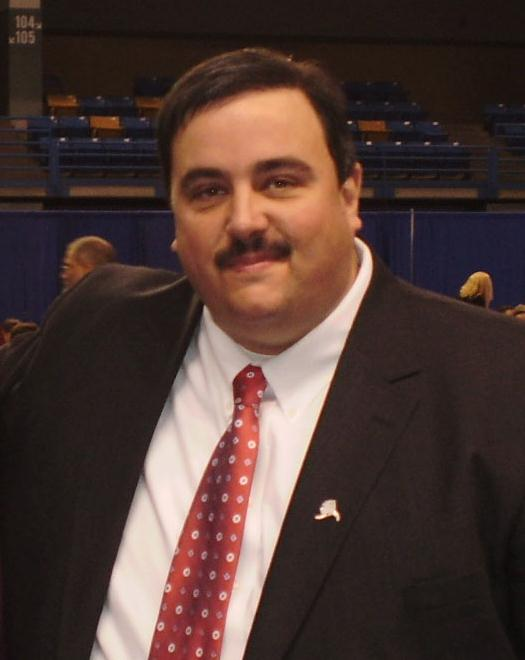
| Candidate | Lisa Murkowski (write-in) | Joe Miller | Scott McAdams |
| Party | Republican | Republican | Democratic |
| Popular vote | 101,091 | 90,839 | 60,045 |
| Percentage | 39.49% | 35.49% | 23.46% |
- Borough and census area results Murkowski: 40–50% 50–60% 60–70% 70–80% Miller: 30–40% 40–50% 50–60% McAdams: 30–40% 40–50%
U.S. senator before election
Lisa Murkowski
Republican
Elected U.S. Senator
Lisa Murkowski
Republican

The 2010 United States Senate election in Alaska took place on November 2, 2010. Incumbent Republican Sen. Lisa Murkowski was re-elected as a write-in candidate despite having been defeated in the Republican primary.

Primary elections were held on August 24, 2010. Sitka Mayor Scott McAdams became the Democratic nominee, while attorney and former federal magistrate Joe Miller defeated Murkowski to become the Republican nominee. Miller was endorsed by the Tea Party movement and by former Governor Sarah Palin. Murkowski announced that despite her defeat in the Republican primary, she would run in the general election as a write-in candidate.

In the general election, Murkowski garnered more than 100,000 write-in votes. Miller challenged 8,000 of those votes. The Associated Press and the Alaska GOP called the race in Murkowski's favor on November 17. Miller did not concede the race and instead filed legal challenges in federal and state court.

On December 30, 2010, Alaska state officials certified Murkowski as the winner of the election. On December 31, Miller announced at a news conference in Anchorage that he was conceding the race. Murkowski is only the second U.S. Senate candidate since the passage of the Seventeenth Amendment in 1913 to win an election as a write-in candidate and defeat candidates listed on the ballot (the first was Strom Thurmond in 1954). Murkowski also became the first person since 1970 to win election to the Senate with under 40% of the vote.

== Democratic-Libertarian-Independence primary ==
Alaska's primary elections at the time, from 2000 to 2020, had voters make a choice between a closed primary ballot for Republican candidates, open to voters that have declared themselves as Republicans, nonpartisan, or undeclared, and, since 2004, a combined open primary ballot for Democrats, Libertarians, the Alaska Independence Party, and all other declared or write-in candidates, open to voters of any declaration.

=== Candidates ===
- David Haase (L)
- Jacob Seth Kern (D)
- Scott McAdams (D), mayor of Sitka
- Frank Vondersaar (D), perennial candidate

=== Results ===
Primary results
| Party | Candidate | Votes | % |
|---|---|---|---|
| Democratic | Scott McAdams | 18,035 | 51.41% |
| Democratic | Jacob Seth Kern | 6,913 | 19.71% |
| Libertarian | David Haase | 5,793 | 16.49% |
| Democratic | Frank Vondersaar | 5,339 | 15.22% |
| Total votes | | 36,080 | 100.00% |

== Republican primary ==
Incumbent Republican Senator Lisa Murkowski faced a challenge from Joe Miller, a former U.S. magistrate judge supported by former Governor Sarah Palin, in the August 24, 2010, Republican Party primary election. The New York Times described Murkowski as an establishment candidate and called Miller a "Tea Party upstart", and the race was viewed as a test of the power of the Tea Party movement. The initial results showed Murkowski trailing Miller, 51–49%, with absentee ballots yet to be tallied. After the first round of absentee ballots was counted on August 31, Murkowski conceded, saying that she did not believe that Miller's lead could be overcome in the next round of absentee vote counting. Miller prevailed, receiving 55,878 votes to Murkowski's 53,872.

=== Candidates ===
- Lisa Murkowski, incumbent U.S. Senator since 2002
- Joe Miller, former U.S. magistrate judge

=== Endorsements ===
List of Lisa Murkowski endorsements

U.S. Senators

- Former Senator Ted Stevens of Alaska

State legislators

- State Representative Alan Austerman (R-Kodiak)
- State Senator Con Bunde (R-Anchorage)
- State Speaker of the House Rep. Mike Chenault (R-Nikiski, Kenai)
- State Representative Anna Fairclough (R-Eagle River)
- Former State Speaker of the House Rep. John Harris (R-Valdez)
- State Representative Mike Hawker (R-Anchorage, Girdwood, Hope)
- State Senator Charlie Huggins (R-Mat-Su, Chugiak, Peters Creek)
- State Representative Kyle Johansen (R-Ketchikan)
- State Representative Craig Johnson (R-Anchorage)
- State Senator Lesil McGuire (R-Anchorage)
- State Senator Kevin Meyer (R-Anchorage)
- State Representative Charisse Millett (R-Anchorage)
- State Representative Cathy Muñoz (R-Juneau, Mendenhall Valley)
- State Representative Jay Ramras (R-Fairbanks)
- State Representative Paul Seaton (R-Homer)
- State Senator Bert Stedman (R-Sitka)
- Senate President Gary Stevens (R-Kodiak)
- State Representative Bill Stoltze (R-Chugiak, Peters Creek, Mat-Su)
- State Representative Bill Thomas (R-Haines, Cordova, SE Islands)
- State Senator Tom Wagoner (R-Kenai, Soldotna)
- State Representative Peggy Wilson (R-Wrangell, Sitka, Petersburg)

Local officials

- Mayor Jim Kallander of Cordova, Alaska
- Mayor of Shirley Marquardt of Unalaska, Alaska
- Mayor Lew Williams III of Ketchikan, Alaska

Individuals

- Chris W. Cox, Chairman of the NRA Political Victory Fund

Organizations

- Alaska Native Brotherhood and Sisterhood
- Anchorage Young Republicans
- Marine Conservation Alliance
- NANA Regional Corporation, Inc.
- National Education Association
- NRA Political Victory Fund
- United Fishermen of Alaska
List of Joe Miller endorsements

U.S. Senators

- Senator John Cornyn of Texas
- Senator Jim DeMint of South Carolina
- Senator Jim Inhofe of Oklahoma

U.S. Representatives

- Representative Michele Bachmann of Minnesota

Governors

- Former Governor Mike Huckabee of Arkansas
- Former Governor Sarah Palin of Alaska

State officials

- Former Lieutenant Governor Jack Coghill of Alaska

State legislators

- State Senator John Coghill (R-North Pole)
- State Senator Fred Dyson (R-Eagle River)
- State Representative Wes Keller (R-Wasilla)
- State Representative Tammie Wilson (R-North Pole)

Local officials

- Former Mayor Dale Bagley of Kenai Peninsula Borough, Alaska
- Former Mayor Edna DeVries of Matanuska-Susitna Borough, Alaska

Individuals

- Liz Cheney, daughter of former Vice President Dick Cheney
- Erick Erickson, conservative blogger and managing editor of RedState
- Laura Ingraham, host of the conservative The Laura Ingraham Show radio talk-show
- Alan Keyes, conservative political activist, author, former diplomat and perennial candidate
- Lars Larson, host of the conservative The Lars Larson Show radio talk-show
- Mark Levin, host of the conservative The Mark Levin Show radio talk-show
- Todd Palin, former First Gentleman of Alaska

Organizations

- Alaska Right to Life
- Can-Do Conservatives of America
- Club for Growth
- Conservative Patriots Group
- Defundit.org
- FreedomWorks
- Kenai Peninsula Tea Party Patriots
- National Right to Life Political Action Committee
- RedState
- Repeal ObamaCare PAC
- Tea Party Express

=== Polling ===
| Poll source | Dates administered | Lisa Murkowski | Joe Miller |
|---|---|---|---|
| Moore Research | July 25, 2010 | 62% | 30% |

=== Results ===
Results by borough: Miller: Miller—50–60%; Miller—60–70%; Murkowski: Murkowski—50–60%; Murkowski—60–70%; Murkowski—70–80%

Republican primary results
| Party | Candidate | Votes | % |
|---|---|---|---|
| Republican | Joe Miller | 55,878 | 50.91% |
| Republican | Lisa Murkowski (incumbent) | 53,872 | 49.09% |
| Total votes | | 109,750 | 100.00% |

== General election ==
=== Candidates ===
- Timothy Carter (I)
- Ted Gianoutsos (I)
- David Haase (L), nominee for the U.S. Senate in 2008
- Scott McAdams (D), Mayor of Sitka
- Joe Miller (R), former U.S. magistrate judge
- Lisa Murkowski (R; write-in), incumbent U.S. Senator

=== Campaign ===
After Lisa Murkowski conceded the Republican primary to Joe Miller, Scott McAdams raised over $128,000 through ActBlue, and a private fundraiser at the home of Alaskan State Senator Hollis French raised about $19,000.

The Libertarian Party floated the possibility of offering Murkowski its nomination. On August 29, 2010, however, the executive board of the state Libertarian Party voted not to consider allowing Murkowski on its ticket for the U.S. Senate race. When asked about a write-in candidacy at that time, she said it was "high risk". By September 7 though, she said that she was weighing the option of mounting a write-in campaign. On September 13, Libertarian candidate David Haase reiterated that he would not stand down and let Murkowski replace him on the ballot. Murkowski announced on September 17 that she would enter the general election contest as a write-in candidate, saying she had agonized over the decision, but had been encouraged to run by many voters.

Miller received negative press in mid-October 2010 when his campaign's security guards made a private arrest of a journalist who was persistently questioning Miller about his record as a government employee. Tony Hopfinger, of the Alaska Dispatch, was detained and handcuffed until Anchorage police arrived and released him following a townhall event featuring Miller. No charges were filed. Though the campaign event was open to the general public and held at a public school, the security firm said it had detained the journalist because he had been trespassing and had shoved a man while attempting to question Miller.

In an October 18, 2010 interview, Miller admitted that he had been disciplined for an ethics violation while serving as an assistant attorney for the Fairbanks North Star Borough; he characterized the offense as "petty". Miller later said that he had used government-owned computers to engage in private polling activity during his lunch hour. Miller added that he had been docked three days' pay due to his conduct. Miller's personnel file showed that he used coworkers' computers to vote multiple times in an online poll. Miller then cleared the caches on his coworkers' computers in an attempt to hide what he had done. Miller initially lied about his computer misuse, but later acknowledged his wrongdoing and was suspended. On October 27, The Guardian reported that Sarah Palin and other well-known conservatives were scheduled to "rush to the aid of the beleaguered Tea Party-backed candidate for the US Senate, Joe Miller, after newly released documents reveal he lied about a computer tampering scandal". The Guardian added that "the row has created alarm about the election chances of Miller".

On October 20, during early voting, a voter in Homer photographed a list of write-in candidates that was posted inside a voting booth, which raised the issue of whether the state should be posting, or even providing such a list. A lawsuit was filed alleging that the Alaska Division of Elections was violating AAC, 25.070, which reads in part: "Information regarding a write-in candidate may not be discussed, exhibited or provided at the polling place, or within 200 feet of any entrance to the polling place, on election day." Both Republican and Democratic spokespersons decried the lists as electioneering on behalf of Murkowski; representatives of the Division of Elections maintained that the lists were intended merely to assist voters. On October 27, a judge issued a restraining order barring the lists, noting in his decision "If it were important 'assistance' for the Division to provide voters with lists of write-in candidates, then the Division was asleep at the switch for the past 50 years, the Division first developed the need for a write-in candidate list 12 days ago." Later on the same day, the Alaska Supreme Court ruled that the lists could be distributed to those who asked for them, but that any ballots cast by voters based on information on the lists be "segregated". The Division of Elections responded that they had neither the manpower nor the time to implement such a system by Election Day. By the deadline for registering as a write-in candidate, more than 150 Alaskans had submitted their names as candidates for the U.S. Senate seat, encouraged by an Anchorage talk radio host.

=== Predictions ===
| Source | Ranking | As of |
|---|---|---|
| Cook Political Report | Likely R | October 26, 2010 |
| Rothenberg | Safe R | October 22, 2010 |
| RealClearPolitics | Likely R | October 26, 2010 |
| Sabato's Crystal Ball | Likely R | October 21, 2010 |
| CQ Politics | Likely R | October 26, 2010 |

=== Polling ===
| Poll source | Date(s) administered | Joe Miller (R) | Lisa Murkowski (R) (Note: Lisa Murkowski lost the Republican primary, but ran as a Republican during her write-in bid.) | Scott McAdams (D) | Lead |
|---|---|---|---|---|---|
| Rasmussen Reports | September 19, 2010 | 42% | 27% | 25% | Miller +15 |
| Moore Research | September 23–27, 2010 | 43% | 18% | 28% | Miller +15 |
| CNN/Time/Opinion Research | September 24–28, 2010 | 38% | 36% | 22% | Miller +2 |
| Public Policy Polling | October 9–10, 2010 | 35% | 33% | 26% | Miller +2 |
| CNN/Time/Opinion Research | October 15–19, 2010 | 37% | 37% | 23% | Tie |
| Public Policy Polling | October 30–31, 2010 | 37% | 30% | 30% | Miller +7 |

==== Note ====
Hypothetical polling numbers in a two-way race between Joe Miller (R) and Scott McAdams (D)

| Poll source | Dates administered | Joe Miller (R) | Scott McAdams (D) |
|---|---|---|---|
| Public Policy Polling | August 27–28, 2010 | 47% | 39% |
| Basswood Research | August 28–29, 2010 | 52% | 36% |
| Rasmussen Reports | August 31, 2010 | 50% | 44% |

Hypothetical polling numbers with Lisa Murkowski as a Libertarian

| Poll source | Dates administered | Joe Miller (R) | Lisa Murkowski (L) | Scott McAdams (D) |
|---|---|---|---|---|
| Public Policy Polling | August 27–28, 2010 | 38% | 34% | 22% |
| Dittman Research | August 30, 2010 | 31% | 37% | 19% |

- It was announced on 9/13/10 that Murkowski cannot run on the Libertarian ticket.

=== Fundraising ===
| Candidate (party) | Receipts | Disbursements | Cash on hand | Debt |
|---|---|---|---|---|
| Joe Miller (R) | $1,980,296 | $1,331,859 | $647,934 | $341 |
| Scott McAdams (D) | $861,121 | $587,639 | $273,480 | $0 |
| Lisa Murkowski (R-Write-in) | $3,416,929 | $3,005,107 | $773,826 | $0 |
Source: Federal Election Commission

=== Post-election day events ===
On Election Day, the write-in ballots were counted, but not examined: determining for which candidate they were cast was deferred. After election officials tabulated 27,000 additional absentee and early ballots, Miller had won 35 percent of the vote while forty percent of the ballots cast were write-ins, which required a hand count to see what names were on them.

==== Write-in count ====
The total number of write-in votes statewide was counted first. Then, all the write-in ballots were sent to Juneau to the Division of Elections to be individually examined to see what names were written on them.

Alaska election officials said they were counting write-in ballots with misspellings if the names written in were phonetic to Murkowski, claiming that Alaska case law supports this practice. The Miller campaign had observers present who challenged ballots which misspelled "Murkowski", or which included the word "Republican" next to Murkowski's name. The Anchorage Daily News noted on November 11 that the bulk of the challenged ballots contained misspellings but examples were not hard to find of challenged ballots that appeared to be "spelled accurately and looked to be filled out properly".

After several days of counting, the Division of Elections showed Murkowski with a lead of some 1,700 votes over Miller, with about 8,000 write-in votes yet to be counted, and a trend of counting 97 percent of the write-ins as for Murkowski. Murkowski's campaign shied away from declaring a victory before the count was finished. As of November 17, (the last day of the hand count), the Division of Elections showed Murkowski having a lead of over 10,000 votes, meaning that even if all the 8,000 challenged ballots were discounted, Murkowski would still lead by about 2,200 votes. The Miller campaign then demanded a hand recount of the entire election, claiming that as Murkowski's votes were all verified by visual inspection, Miller should get the same opportunity. The Division of Election officials responded that any recount of non-write-in votes would not be done by hand, but would be done using optical scanners.

==== Lawsuits ====
Miller filed a federal lawsuit on November 9, 2010, seeking to have write-in ballots that contained spelling and other errors from being counted toward Murkowski's total and a seeking preliminary injunction to prevent the counting of the write-in votes from even beginning. He claimed that he had a federal case because State election officials were violating the Elections Clause of the U.S. Constitution and the Equal Protection Clause of the 14th Amendment by using a voter intent standard that allowed misspelled write-in votes to count. The federal court allowed the counting to proceed as the challenged ballots were segregated from the others and could be re-examined later, if necessary. After hearing motions and arguments from both sides, the federal court abstained from hearing the case, ruling that the dispute could be resolved by the State courts by reference to State law. The federal court kept the case in its docket in the event that federal issues still remained after the State courts' determination. The federal court also put a halt to the certification of the election pending rulings on Miller's lawsuits. Miller then filed suit in State court, repeating the claims he had previously made, and adding allegations of vote fraud and bias.

On December 10, the Alaska Superior Court rejected all of Miller's claims as contrary to State statute and case law, and said the fraud claims were unsubstantiated. Miller then appealed the Superior Court ruling to the Alaska Supreme Court, citing a provision in the Alaska election statute that says there shall be "no exceptions" to the rules for counting ballots, and that therefore, all ballots with misspellings or other deviations should be thrown out. After oral arguments were heard on December 17, on December 22, the Alaska Supreme Court upheld the lower court's ruling dismissing Miller's claims. On December 26, Miller announced that he would be withdrawing his opposition for Murkowski's Senate certification, but would continue pursuing his federal case.

==== Certification ====
On December 30, 2010, Alaska state officials certified Murkowski as the winner of the general election, making her the first U.S. Senate candidate to win election via write-in since Strom Thurmond in 1954.

On December 31, Miller announced at a news conference in Anchorage that he was conceding the election.

=== Results ===
Write-in totals (100% precincts reporting)
| Candidate | Votes | Percentage |
|---|---|---|
| Lisa Murkowski (unchallenged) | 92,931 | 89.52% |
| Lisa Murkowski (challenged, included in candidate total) | 8,160 | 7.86% |
| Lisa Murkowski (total of unchallenged votes and votes that were challenged and included in candidate total) | 101,091 | 97.39% |
| Lisa Murkowski (challenged, not included in candidate total) | 2,035 | 1.96% |
| Misc. names | 602 | 0.58% |
| Joe Miller | 21 | 0.02% |
| Scott McAdams | 8 | 0.01% |
| All other write-in candidates | 53 | 0.05% |
| Totals | 103,810 | 100% |

Final/certified general election results
| Party | Candidate | Votes | % | ±% |
|---|---|---|---|---|
| Republican | Lisa Murkowski (incumbent, write-in) | 101,091 | 39.49% | N/A |
| Republican | Joe Miller | 90,839 | 35.49% | −13.09% |
| Democratic | Scott McAdams | 60,045 | 23.46% | −22.09% |
| Libertarian | David Haase | 1,459 | 0.57% | +0.17% |
| Independent | Timothy Carter | 927 | 0.36% | N/A |
| Independent | Ted Gianoutsos | 458 | 0.18% | −0.06% |
| Total votes | | 255,962 | 100.0% | |
| Republican hold | | | | |
