= 1954 United States Senate election in South Carolina =

- November 2, 1954
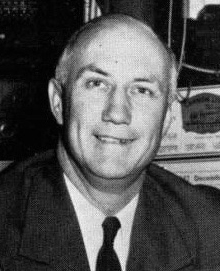

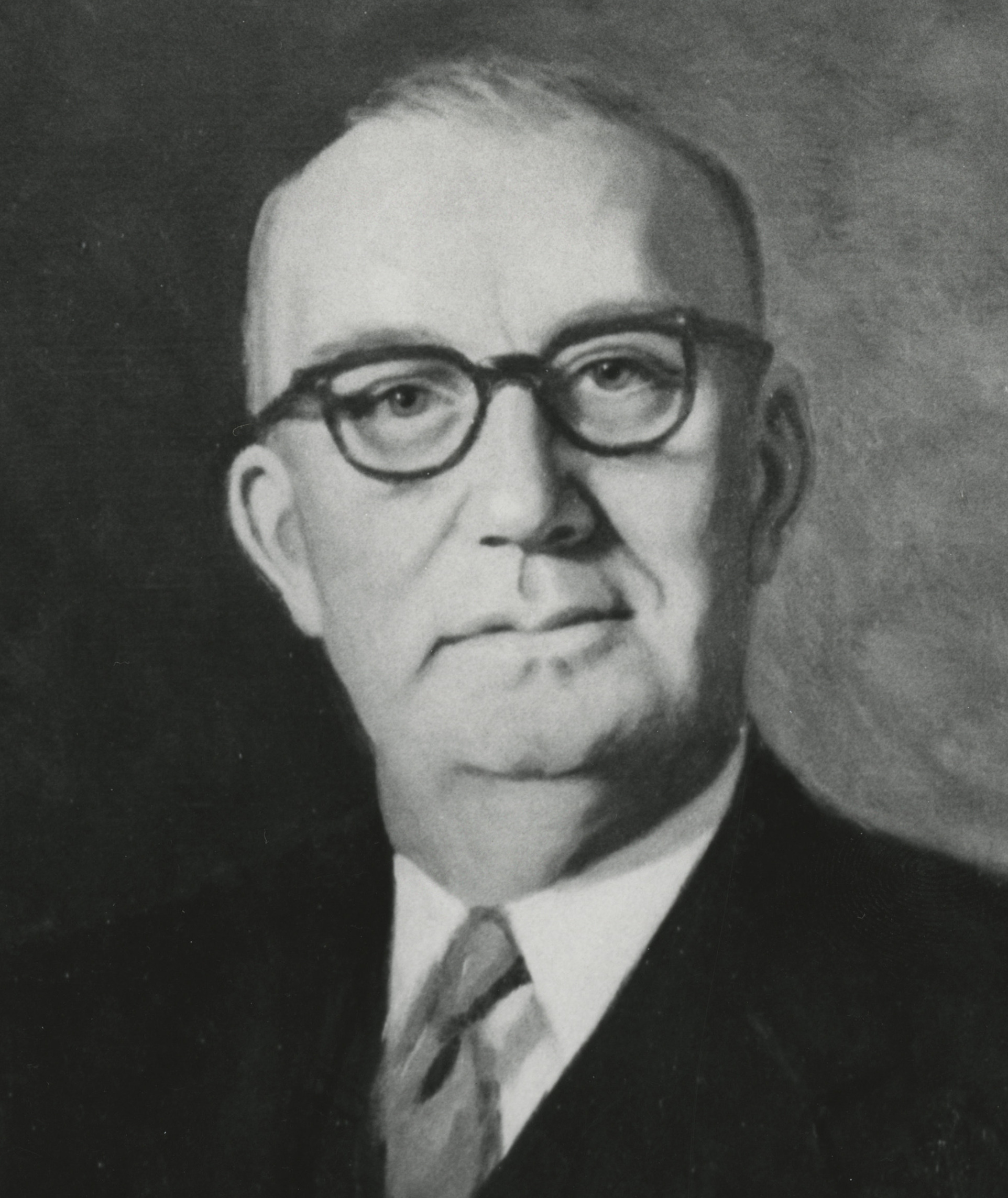
Candidate	Strom Thurmond (write-in)	Edgar A. Brown
Party	Democratic	Democratic
Popular vote	143,444	83,525
Percentage	63.13%	36.76%
- Thurmond: 50–60% 60–70% 70–80% 80–90% Brown: 50–60% 60–70% >90%
U.S. senator before election
Charles E. Daniel
Democratic
Elected U.S. Senator
Strom Thurmond
Democratic

The 1954 South Carolina United States Senate election was held on November 2, 1954. Senator Burnet R. Maybank did not face a primary challenge in the summer and was therefore renominated as the Democratic nominee for the election in the fall. However, his death on September 1 left the Democratic Party without a nominee, and the executive committee nominated state Senator Edgar A. Brown as their replacement candidate. Many South Carolinians were outraged by the party's decision to forgo a primary election, and former Governor Strom Thurmond entered the race as a write-in candidate. He easily won the election and became the first U.S. senator to be elected by a write-in vote in an election where other candidates were listed on the ballot. (Note: William Knowland of California in 1946 was the first Senate candidate to win via write-in, but the ballots in that election were blank with no candidates listed, so essentially every candidate was running a write-in campaign.) A Senate election where the victor won by a write-in campaign did not occur again until the 2010 United States Senate election in Alaska.

== General election campaign ==
=== State Democratic Party executive committee ===
Sitting Senator Burnet R. Maybank entered the 1954 contest without a challenge in the Democratic primary nor in the general election. His unexpected death on September 1 caused panic and confusion within the hierarchy of the state Democratic party because the state law required that a party's nominee be certified by September 3. Hours after Maybank's funeral, the state Democratic executive committee met in secret and chose state Senator Edgar A. Brown of Barnwell County as the party's nominee for the general election. Not only was Brown a part of the "Barnwell Ring", but he was also a member of the executive committee.

The state Democratic Party's decision to choose a candidate without holding a special primary election drew widespread criticism across the state. On September 3, The Greenville News ran an editorial advocating that a primary election be called and several newspapers across the state followed suit. At least six county Democratic committees repudiated the action by the state committee and called for a primary election. Despite repeated calls for a primary, the state executive committee voted against holding a primary because they did not think that there was enough time before the general election to hold a primary election.

Immediately after the executive committee voted against holding a primary election, former Governor Strom Thurmond and lumberman Marcus Stone announced their intention to run as Democratic write-in candidates. Thurmond and his supporters stated that the executive committee had several legal alternatives as opposed to the outright appointment of state Senator Brown. In addition, Thurmond promised that if he were elected he would resign in 1956 so that the voters could choose a candidate in the regular primary for the remaining four years of the term.

=== Campaigns of the candidates ===
Thurmond received support from Governor James F. Byrnes and from those who backed his Presidential bid as a Dixiecrat in the 1948 Presidential election. Thurmond framed the race as a "moral issue: democracy versus committee rule" and his write-in campaign was repeatedly assisted by every newspaper in the state, except for those in Anderson. For instance, The News and Courier devoted its front page on November 2 to show voters a sample ballot and it also provided detailed instructions on how to cast a write-in vote. Not only that, but the newspaper also printed an editorial on the front page giving precise reasons why voters should vote for Thurmond instead of Brown.

On the other hand, Brown was supported by the Democratic party regulars and he also gained the endorsement of Senator Olin D. Johnston. Brown based his campaign entirely on the issue of party loyalty, stressing that Thurmond was a Republican ally because he had voted for President Eisenhower in 1952.

Marcus A. Stone, a lumberman in Florence and Dillon, was a candidate in previous Democratic primaries for governor and senator. He did very little campaigning for the general election.

== General election results ==
South Carolina U.S. Senate Election, 1954
Party	Candidate	Votes	%	±%
Democratic	Strom Thurmond (Write-In)	143,444	63.13%	+63.1
Democratic	Edgar A. Brown	83,525	36.76%	−59.6
Democratic	Marcus Stone (Write-In)	240	0.11%	+0.1
No party	Write-Ins	23	0.01%	0.0
Majority		59,919	26.37%	−66.5
Turnout		227,232		
Democratic hold				

== See also ==
- List of United States senators from South Carolina
- 1954 United States Senate elections
- 1954 South Carolina gubernatorial election
