= 1998 United States Senate elections =

- November 3, 1998
- Class 3

34 of the 100 seats in the United States Senate 51 seats needed for a majority
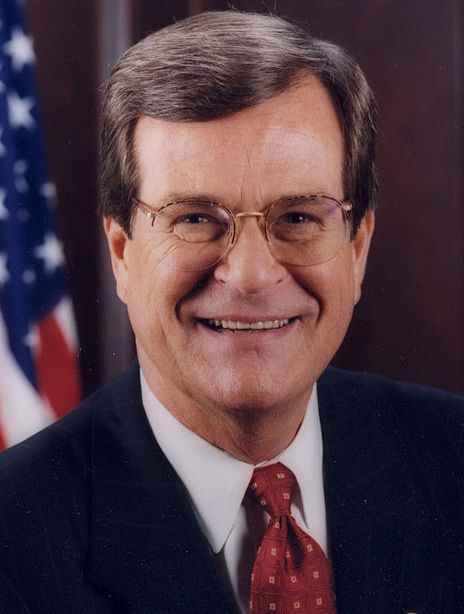

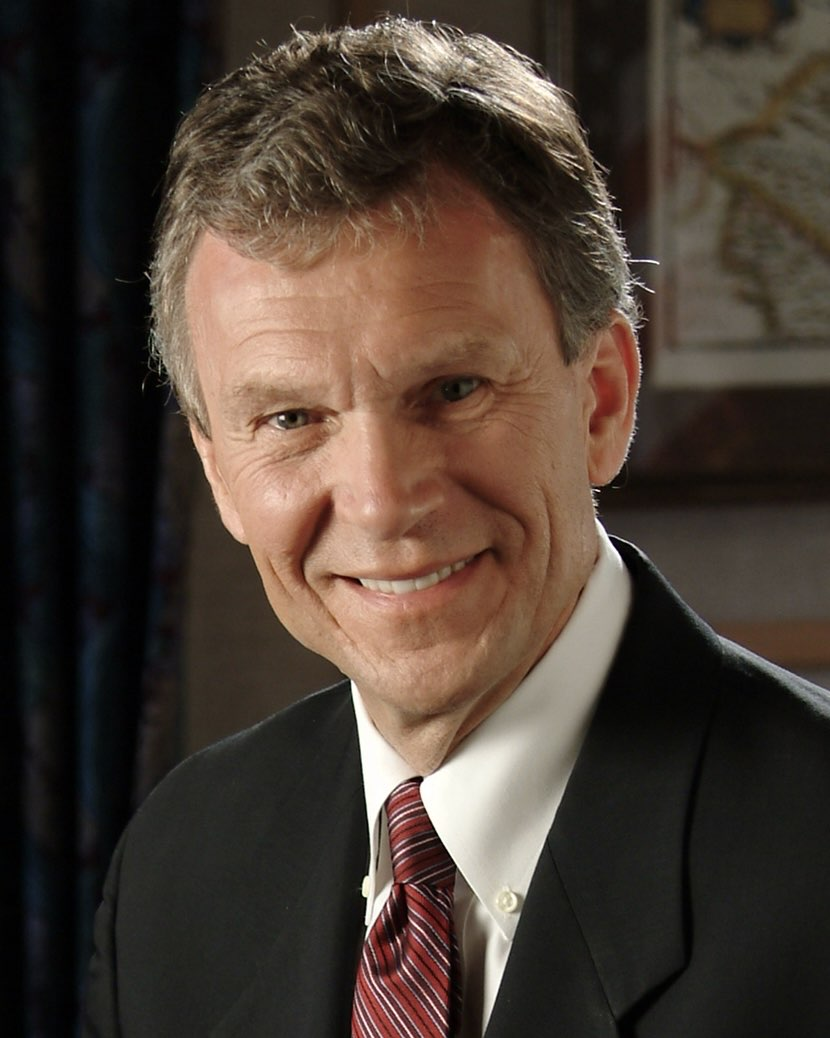
	Majority party	Minority party
Leader	Trent Lott	Tom Daschle
Party	Republican	Democratic
Leader since	June 12, 1996	January 3, 1995
Leader's seat	Mississippi	South Dakota
Seats before	55	45
Seats after	55	45
Seat change	Steady	Steady
Popular vote	25,346,613	26,768,699
Percentage	46.8%	49.5%
Seats up	16	18
Races won	16	18
- Results of the elections: Democratic gain Democratic hold Republican gain Republican hold No election
Majority leader before election
Trent Lott
Republican
Elected Majority leader
Trent Lott
Republican

The 1998 United States Senate elections were held on November 3, 1998, with the 34 seats of Class 3 contested in regular elections. This was seen as an even contest between the Republican Party and Democratic Party. While the Democrats had to defend more seats up for election, the Republican attacks on the morality of President Bill Clinton failed to connect with voters and the anticipated Republican gains did not materialize. The Republicans picked open seats up in Ohio and Kentucky and narrowly defeated Democratic incumbent Carol Moseley Braun (Illinois), but these were cancelled out by the Democrats' gain of an open seat in Indiana and defeats of Republican Senators Al D'Amato (New York) and Lauch Faircloth (North Carolina). The balance of the Senate remained unchanged at 55–45 in favor of the Republicans, thereby tying these election results with those of 1996 and 2004 as the highest number of Senate seats that the Republicans have held since 1920.

This is the last election cycle that resulted in no net change in the balance of power. As of 2026, this is the most recent time in which the Democratic Party won a majority of Class 3 Senate seats in a regularly scheduled election.

== Results summary ==
↓
45	55
Democratic	Republican

Parties					Total
Parties	Democratic	Republican	Libertarian	Other	Total
Last elections (1996) Before the elections	45	55	0	0	100
Not up	27	39	—	—	66
Up Class 3 (1992→1998)	18	16	—	—	34
Incumbent retired	3	2	—	—	5
Held by same party	1	1	—	—	2
Replaced by other party	▼1 Republican replaced by ▲1 Democrat ▼2 Democrats replaced by ▲2 Republicans		—	—	3
Result	2	3	—	—	5
Incumbent ran	15	14	—	—	29
Won re-election	14	12	—	—	26
Lost re-election	▼2 Republicans replaced by ▲2 Democrats ▼1 Democrat replaced by ▲1 Republican		—	—	3
Lost renomination, but held by same party	0	0	—	—	0
Result	16	13	—	—	29
Total elected	18	16	0	0	34
Net gain/loss	Steady	Steady	Steady	Steady	0
Nationwide vote	26,768,699	25,346,613	419,452	1,580,287	54,115,051
Share	49.47%	46.84%	0.78%	2.92%	100%
Result	45	55	—	—	100

Source: Office of the Clerk

== Gains, losses, and holds ==
=== Retirements ===
Map of retirements: Republican incumbent Democratic incumbent Democratic incumbent retired Republican incumbent retired

Two Republicans and three Democrats retired instead of seeking re-election.

State	Senator	Age at end of term	Assumed office	Replaced by
Arkansas	Dale Bumpers	73	1975	Blanche Lincoln
Idaho	Dirk Kempthorne	47	1993	Mike Crapo
Indiana	Dan Coats	55	1989 (Note: Appointed to the seat following the resignation of Dan Quayle.)	Evan Bayh
Kentucky	Wendell Ford	74	1974	Jim Bunning
Ohio	John Glenn	77	1974	George Voinovich

=== Defeats ===
One Democrat and two Republicans sought re-election but lost in the general election.

State	Senator	Assumed office	Replaced by
Illinois	Carol Moseley Braun	1993	Peter Fitzgerald
New York	Al D'Amato	1981	Chuck Schumer
North Carolina	Lauch Faircloth	1993	John Edwards

=== Post-election changes ===
Two Republicans died during the 106th Congress, and initially were all replaced by appointees.

State	Senator	Replaced by
Georgia (Class 3)	Paul Coverdell	Zell Miller
Rhode Island (Class 1)	John Chafee	Lincoln Chafee

== Change in composition ==
=== Before the elections ===
D_{1}	D_{2}	D_{3}	D_{4}	D_{5}	D_{6}	D_{7}	D_{8}	D_{9}	D_{10}
D_{20}	D_{19}	D_{18}	D_{17}	D_{16}	D_{15}	D_{14}	D_{13}	D_{12}	D_{11}
D_{21}	D_{22}	D_{23}	D_{24}	D_{25}	D_{26}	D_{27}	D_{28} Ark. Retired	D_{29} Calif. Ran	D_{30} Conn. Ran
D_{40} Ore. Ran	D_{39} Ohio; Retired	D_{38} N.D. Ran	D_{37} Nev. Ran	D_{36} Md. Ran	D_{35} La. Ran	D_{34} Ky. Retired	D_{33} Ill. Ran	D_{32} Hawaii; Ran	D_{31} Fla. Ran
D_{41} S.C. Ran	D_{42} S.D. Ran	D_{43} Vt. Ran	D_{44} Wash. Ran	D_{45} Wisc. Ran	R_{55} Utah; Ran	R_{54} Pa. Ran	R_{53} Okla. Ran	R_{52} N.C. Ran	R_{51} N.Y. Ran
Majority →									R_{51} N.Y. Ran
R_{41} Alaska; Ran	R_{42} Ariz. Ran	R_{43} Colo. Ran	R_{44} Ga. Ran	R_{45} Idaho; Retired	R_{46} Ind. Retired	R_{47} Iowa; Ran	R_{48} Kans. Ran	R_{49} Mo. Ran	R_{50} N.H. Ran
R_{40} Ala. Ran	R_{39}	R_{38}	R_{37}	R_{36}	R_{35}	R_{34}	R_{33}	R_{32}	R_{31}
R_{21}	R_{22}	R_{23}	R_{24}	R_{25}	R_{26}	R_{27}	R_{28}	R_{29}	R_{30}
R_{20}	R_{19}	R_{18}	R_{17}	R_{16}	R_{15}	R_{14}	R_{13}	R_{12}	R_{11}
R_{1}	R_{2}	R_{3}	R_{4}	R_{5}	R_{6}	R_{7}	R_{8}	R_{9}	R_{10}

=== After the elections ===
D_{1}	D_{2}	D_{3}	D_{4}	D_{5}	D_{6}	D_{7}	D_{8}	D_{9}	D_{10}
D_{20}	D_{19}	D_{18}	D_{17}	D_{16}	D_{15}	D_{14}	D_{13}	D_{12}	D_{11}
D_{21}	D_{22}	D_{23}	D_{24}	D_{25}	D_{26}	D_{27}	D_{28} Ark. Hold	D_{29} Calif. Re-elected	D_{30} Conn. Re-elected
D_{40} Vt. Re-elected	D_{39} S.D. Re-elected	D_{38} S.C. Re-elected	D_{37} Ore. Re-elected	D_{36} N.D. Re-elected	D_{35} Nev. Re-elected	D_{34} Md. Re-elected	D_{33} La. Re-elected	D_{32} Hawaii; Re-elected	D_{31} Fla. Re-elected
D_{41} Wash. Re-elected	D_{42} Wisc. Re-elected	D_{43} Ind. Gain	D_{44} N.Y. Gain	D_{45} N.C. Gain	R_{55} Ohio; Gain	R_{54} Ky. Gain	R_{53} Ill. Gain	R_{52} Utah; Re-elected	R_{51} Pa. Re-elected
Majority →									R_{51} Pa. Re-elected
R_{41} Alaska; Re-elected	R_{42} Ariz. Re-elected	R_{43} Colo. Re-elected	R_{44} Ga. Re-elected	R_{45} Idaho; Hold	R_{46} Iowa; Re-elected	R_{47} Kans. Re-elected	R_{48} Mo. Re-elected	R_{49} N.H. Re-elected	R_{50} Okla. Re-elected
R_{40} Ala. Re-elected	R_{39}	R_{38}	R_{37}	R_{36}	R_{35}	R_{34}	R_{33}	R_{32}	R_{31}
R_{21}	R_{22}	R_{23}	R_{24}	R_{25}	R_{26}	R_{27}	R_{28}	R_{29}	R_{30}
R_{20}	R_{19}	R_{18}	R_{17}	R_{16}	R_{15}	R_{14}	R_{13}	R_{12}	R_{11}
R_{1}	R_{2}	R_{3}	R_{4}	R_{5}	R_{6}	R_{7}	R_{8}	R_{9}	R_{10}

Key	D_{#} / Democratic; R_{#} / Republican

== Race summary ==
=== Special elections during the 105th Congress ===
There were no special elections in 1998.

=== Elections leading to the next Congress ===
In these general elections, the winners were elected for the term beginning January 3, 1999; ordered by state.

All of the elections involved the Class 3 seats.

State	Incumbent			Results	Candidates
State	Senator	Party	Electoral history	Results	Candidates
Alabama	Richard Shelby	Republican	1986 (Note: Shelby was first elected in 1986 and re-elected in 1992 as a Democrat. He switched parties in 1994.); 1992	Incumbent re-elected.	▌ ✓ Richard Shelby (Republican) 63.2%; ▌Clayton Suddith (Democratic) 36.7%
Alaska	Frank Murkowski	Republican	1980; 1986; 1992	Incumbent re-elected.	▌ ✓ Frank Murkowski (Republican) 74.5%; ▌Joe Sonneman (Democratic) 19.7%; ▌Jeffrey Gottlieb (Green) 3.2%; ▌Scott Kohlhaas (Libertarian) 2.3%
Arizona	John McCain	Republican	1986; 1992	Incumbent re-elected.	▌ ✓ John McCain (Republican) 68.7%; ▌Ed Ranger (Democratic) 27.2%; Others: ▌John C. Zajac (Libertarian) 2.3%; ▌Bob Park (Reform) 1.8%
Arkansas	Dale Bumpers	Democratic	1974; 1980; 1986; 1992	Incumbent retired. Democratic hold.	▌ ✓ Blanche Lincoln (Democratic) 55.1%; ▌Fay Boozman (Republican) 42.2%; ▌Charley E. Heffley (Reform) 2.7%
California	Barbara Boxer	Democratic	1992	Incumbent re-elected.	▌ ✓ Barbara Boxer (Democratic) 53%; ▌Matt Fong (Republican) 43%; Others: ▌Ted Brown (Libertarian) 1.1%; ▌Timothy R. Erich (Reform) 1%; ▌H. Joseph Perrin, Sr. (American Independent) 0.7%; ▌Ophie C. Beltran (Peace and Freedom) 0.6%; ▌Brian M. Rees (Natural Law) 0.6%
Colorado	Ben Nighthorse Campbell	Republican	1992 (Note: Campbell was first elected as a Democrat. He switched parties on March 3, 1995.)	Incumbent re-elected.	▌ ✓ Ben Nighthorse Campbell (Republican) 62.5%; ▌Dottie Lamm (Democratic) 35.0%; Others: ▌David S. Segal (Libertarian) 1.0%; ▌Kevin Swanson (American Constitution) 0.7%; ▌Jeff Peckman (Natural Law) 0.3%; ▌John Heckman (Concerns of People) 0.2%; ▌Gary Swing (Pacifist) 0.1%
Connecticut	Chris Dodd	Democratic	1980; 1986; 1992	Incumbent re-elected.	▌ ✓ Chris Dodd (Democratic) 65.1%; ▌Gary Franks (Republican) 32.4%; Others: ▌William Kozak (Concerned Citizens) 1.3%; ▌Lois A. Grasso (Term Limits) 0.7%; ▌Wildey Moore (Libertarian) 0.5%
Florida	Bob Graham	Democratic	1986; 1992	Incumbent re-elected.	▌ ✓ Bob Graham (Democratic) 62.5%; ▌Charlie Crist (Republican) 37.5%
Georgia	Paul Coverdell	Republican	1992	Incumbent re-elected.	▌ ✓ Paul Coverdell (Republican) 52.3%; ▌Michael Coles (Democratic) 45.3%; ▌Bertil Armin Loftman (Libertarian) 2.5%
Hawaii	Daniel Inouye	Democratic	1962; 1968; 1974; 1980; 1986; 1992	Incumbent re-elected.	▌ ✓ Daniel Inouye (Democratic) 79.2%; ▌Crystal Young (Republican) 17.8%; ▌Lloyd Mallan (Libertarian) 3%
Idaho	Dirk Kempthorne	Republican	1992	Incumbent retired to run for governor of Idaho. Republican hold.	▌ ✓ Mike Crapo (Republican) 69.5%; ▌Bill Mauk (Democratic) 28.4%; ▌George J. Mansfeld (Natural Law) 2%
Illinois	Carol Moseley Braun	Democratic	1992	Incumbent lost re-election. Republican gain.	▌ ✓ Peter Fitzgerald (Republican) 50.3%; ▌Carol Moseley Braun (Democratic) 47.4%; Others: ▌Don A. Torgersen (Reform) 2.2%; ▌Raymond W. Stalker (U.S. Taxpayers) 0.01%
Indiana	Dan Coats	Republican	1989 (appointed); 1990 (special); 1992	Incumbent retired. Democratic gain.	▌ ✓ Evan Bayh (Democratic) 63.7%; ▌Paul Helmke (Republican) 34.8%; ▌Rebecca Sink-Burris (Libertarian) 1.5%
Iowa	Chuck Grassley	Republican	1980; 1986; 1992	Incumbent re-elected.	▌ ✓ Chuck Grassley (Republican) 68.4%; ▌David Osterberg (Democratic) 30.5%; Others: ▌Susan Marcus (Natural Law) 0.8%; ▌Margaret Trowe (Socialist Workers) 0.3%
Kansas	Sam Brownback	Republican	1996 (special)	Incumbent re-elected.	▌ ✓ Sam Brownback (Republican) 65.3%; ▌Paul Feleciano Jr. (Democratic) 31.6%; Others: ▌Tom Oyler (Libertarian) 1.6%; ▌Alvin Bauman (Reform) 1.5%
Kentucky	Wendell Ford	Democratic	1974; 1974 (appointed); 1980; 1986; 1992	Incumbent retired. Republican gain.	▌ ✓ Jim Bunning (Republican) 49.7%; ▌Scotty Baesler (Democratic) 49.2%; ▌Charles R. Arbegust (Reform) 1.1%
Louisiana	John Breaux	Democratic	1986; 1992	Incumbent re-elected.	▌ ✓ John Breaux (Democratic) 64%; ▌Jim Donelon (Republican) 32%
Maryland	Barbara Mikulski	Democratic	1986; 1992	Incumbent re-elected.	▌ ✓ Barbara Mikulski (Democratic) 70.5%; ▌Ross Pierpont (Republican) 29.5%
Missouri	Kit Bond	Republican	1986; 1992	Incumbent re-elected.	▌ ✓ Kit Bond (Republican) 52.7%; ▌Jay Nixon (Democratic) 43.8%; Others: ▌Tamara Millay (Libertarian) 2.0%; ▌Curtis Frazier (U.S. Taxpayers) 1.0%; ▌James F. Newport (Reform) 0.5%
Nevada	Harry Reid	Democratic	1986; 1992	Incumbent re-elected.	▌ ✓ Harry Reid (Democratic) 47.9%; ▌John Ensign (Republican) 47.8%; Others: ▌Michael Cloud (Libertarian) 1.9%; None of These Candidates 1.8%; ▌Michael E. Williams (Natural Law) 0.6%
New Hampshire	Judd Gregg	Republican	1992	Incumbent re-elected.	▌ ✓ Judd Gregg (Republican) 67.8%; ▌George Condodemetraky (Democratic) 28.2%; Others: ▌Brian Christeson (Libertarian) 2.4%; ▌Roy Kendel (Independent) 1.5%
New York	Al D'Amato	Republican	1980; 1986; 1992	Incumbent lost re-election. Democratic gain.	▌ ✓ Chuck Schumer (Democratic) 54.6%; ▌Al D'Amato (Republican) 44.1%; Others: ▌Corinne E. Kurtz (Marijuana Reform) 0.7%; ▌Joel Kovel (Green) 0.3%; ▌William P. McMillen (Libertarian) 0.2%; ▌Rose Ana Berbeo (Socialist Workers) 0.1%
North Carolina	Lauch Faircloth	Republican	1992	Incumbent lost re-election. Democratic gain.	▌ ✓ John Edwards (Democratic) 51.2%; ▌Lauch Faircloth (Republican) 47.0%; ▌Barbara Howe (Libertarian) 1.8%
North Dakota	Byron Dorgan	Democratic-NPL	1992	Incumbent re-elected.	▌ ✓ Byron Dorgan (Democratic-NPL) 63.1%; ▌Donna Nalewaja (Republican) 35.2%; ▌Harley McLain (Libertarian) 1.7%
Ohio	John Glenn	Democratic	1974; 1974 (appointed); 1980; 1986; 1992	Incumbent retired. Republican gain.	▌ ✓ George Voinovich (Republican) 56.5%; ▌Mary Boyle (Democratic) 43.5%
Oklahoma	Don Nickles	Republican	1980; 1986; 1992	Incumbent re-elected.	▌ ✓ Don Nickles (Republican) 66.4%; ▌Don Carroll (Democratic) 31.3%; Others: ▌Mike Morris (Independent) 1.8%; ▌Argus W. Yandell, Jr. (Independent) 0.5%
Oregon	Ron Wyden	Democratic	1996 (special)	Incumbent re-elected.	▌ ✓ Ron Wyden (Democratic) 61%; ▌John Lim (Republican) 33.8%; Others: ▌Karen Moskowitz (Green) 2.0%; ▌Jim Brewster (Libertarian) 1.6%; ▌Michael A. Campbell (Natural Law) 0.8%; ▌Dean M. Braa (Socialist) 0.7%
Pennsylvania	Arlen Specter	Republican	1980; 1986; 1992	Incumbent re-elected.	▌ ✓ Arlen Specter (Republican) 61.3%; ▌Bill Lloyd (Democratic) 34.8%; Others: ▌Dean Snyder (Constitution) 2.3%; ▌Jack Iannantuono (Libertarian) 1.6%
South Carolina	Fritz Hollings	Democratic	1966 (special); 1968; 1974; 1980; 1986; 1992	Incumbent re-elected.	▌ ✓ Fritz Hollings (Democratic) 52.7%; ▌Bob Inglis (Republican) 45.7%; ▌Richard Quillian (Libertarian) 1.6%
South Dakota	Tom Daschle	Democratic	1986; 1992	Incumbent re-elected.	▌ ✓ Tom Daschle (Democratic) 62.1%; ▌Ron Schmidt (Republican) 36.4%; ▌Byron Dale (Libertarian) 1.4%
Utah	Bob Bennett	Republican	1992	Incumbent re-elected.	▌ ✓ Bob Bennett (Republican) 64%; ▌Scott Leckman (Democratic) 33%; ▌Gary R. Van Horn (Independent American) 3%
Vermont	Patrick Leahy	Democratic	1974; 1980; 1986; 1992	Incumbent re-elected.	▌ ✓ Patrick Leahy (Democratic) 72.2%; ▌Fred Tuttle (Republican) 22.5%; Others: ▌Hugh Douglas (Libertarian) 2.0%; ▌Barry M. Nelson (Independent) 1.4%; ▌Bob Melamede (Vermont Grassroots) 1.2%; ▌Jerry Levy (Liberty Union) 0.6%
Washington	Patty Murray	Democratic	1992	Incumbent re-elected.	▌ ✓ Patty Murray (Democratic) 58.4%; ▌Linda Smith (Republican) 41.6%
Wisconsin	Russ Feingold	Democratic	1992	Incumbent re-elected.	▌ ✓ Russ Feingold (Democratic) 50.6%; ▌Mark Neumann (Republican) 48.4%; Others: ▌Robert R. Raymond (U.S. Taxpayers) 0.5%; ▌Tom Ender (Libertarian) 0.3%; ▌Eugene A. Hem (Independent) 0.2%

== Closest races ==
Eight races had a margin of less than 10%:

State	Party of winner	Margin
Nevada	Democratic	0.09%
Kentucky	Republican (flip)	0.59%
Wisconsin	Democratic	2.1%
Illinois	Republican (flip)	2.9%
North Carolina	Democratic (flip)	4.1%
South Carolina	Democratic	7.0%
Georgia	Republican	7.2%
Missouri	Republican	8.9%

Ohio was the tipping point state with a margin of 13%.

== Alabama ==
Alabama election
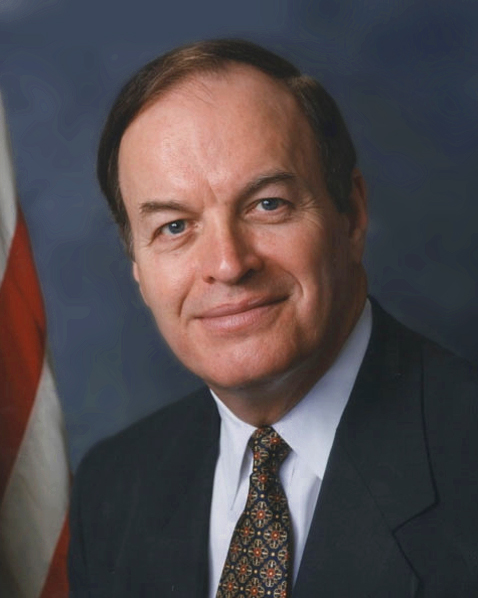

Nominee	Richard Shelby	Clayton Suddith
Party	Republican	Democratic
Popular vote	817,973	474,568
Percentage	63.2%	36.7%
- County results Shelby: 50–60% 60–70% 70–80% 80–90% Suddith: 50–60% 60–70% 70–80%
U.S. senator before election
Richard Shelby
Republican
Elected U.S. Senator
Richard Shelby
Republican

Incumbent Republican Richard Shelby won re-election to a third term. Shelby had been elected in 1986 and 1992 as a Democrat, but switched to the Republican party in 1994, making this the first election he competed in as a Republican. He beat Democrat Clayton Suddith, an Army veteran and former Franklin County commissioner.

1998 United States Senate election in Alabama
Party	Candidate	Votes	%
Republican	Richard Shelby (incumbent)	817,973	63.2%
Democratic	Clayton Suddith	474,568	36.7%
Independent	Write-ins	864	0.1%
Majority		343,405	26.5%
Turnout		1,293,405	100.0%
Republican hold			

== Alaska ==
Alaska election
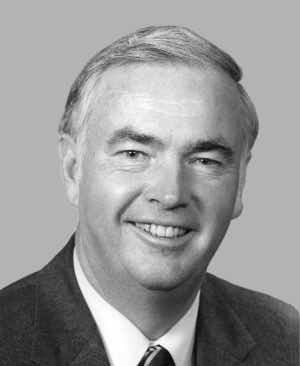

Nominee	Frank Murkowski	Joseph Sonneman
Party	Republican	Democratic
Popular vote	165,227	43,743
Percentage	74.5%	19.7%
- Results by state house district Murkowski: 40–50% 60–70% 70–80% 80–90%
U.S. senator before election
Frank Murkowski
Republican
Elected U.S. Senator
Frank Murkowski
Republican

Incumbent Republican Frank Murkowski easily won re-election to a fourth term against Democratic nominee Joseph Sonneman, a perennial candidate, earning nearly 75% of the vote.

Open primary
Party	Candidate	Votes	%
Republican	Frank Murkowski (incumbent)	76,649	71.76%
Democratic	Joseph Sonneman	10,721	10.04%
Democratic	Frank Vondersaar	6,342	5.94%
Republican	William L. Hale	6,313	5.91%
Green	Jeffrey Gottlieb	4,796	4.49%
Libertarian	Scott A. Kohlhaas	1,987	1.86%
Total votes		106,808	100.00%
Republican hold			

1998 United States Senate election in Alaska
Party	Candidate	Votes	%	±%
Republican	Frank Murkowski (incumbent)	165,227	74.49%	+21.44%
Democratic	Joe Sonneman	43,743	19.72%	−18.68%
Green	Jeffrey Gottlieb	7,126	3.21%	−5.14%
Libertarian	Scott A. Kohlhaas	5,046	2.27%	
Write-ins		665	0.30%	
Majority		121,484	54.77%	+40.13%
Turnout		221,807		
Republican hold				

== Arizona ==
Arizona election
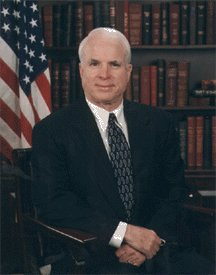

Nominee	John McCain	Ed Ranger
Party	Republican	Democratic
Popular vote	696,577	275,224
Percentage	68.7%	27.2%
- County results McCain: 50–60% 60–70% 70–80%
U.S. senator before election
John McCain
Republican
Elected U.S. Senator
John McCain
Republican

Incumbent Republican John McCain won re-election to a third term over Democratic attorney Ed Ranger.

General election result
Party	Candidate	Votes	%	±%
Republican	John McCain (incumbent)	696,577	68.74%	+12.93%
Democratic	Ed Ranger	275,224	27.16%	−4.41%
Libertarian	John C. Zajac	23,004	2.27%	+0.63%
Reform	Bob Park	18,288	1.80%	
Write-ins		187	0.02%	
Majority		421,353	41.58%	+17.34%
Turnout		1,013,280		
Republican hold				

== Arkansas ==
Arkansas election
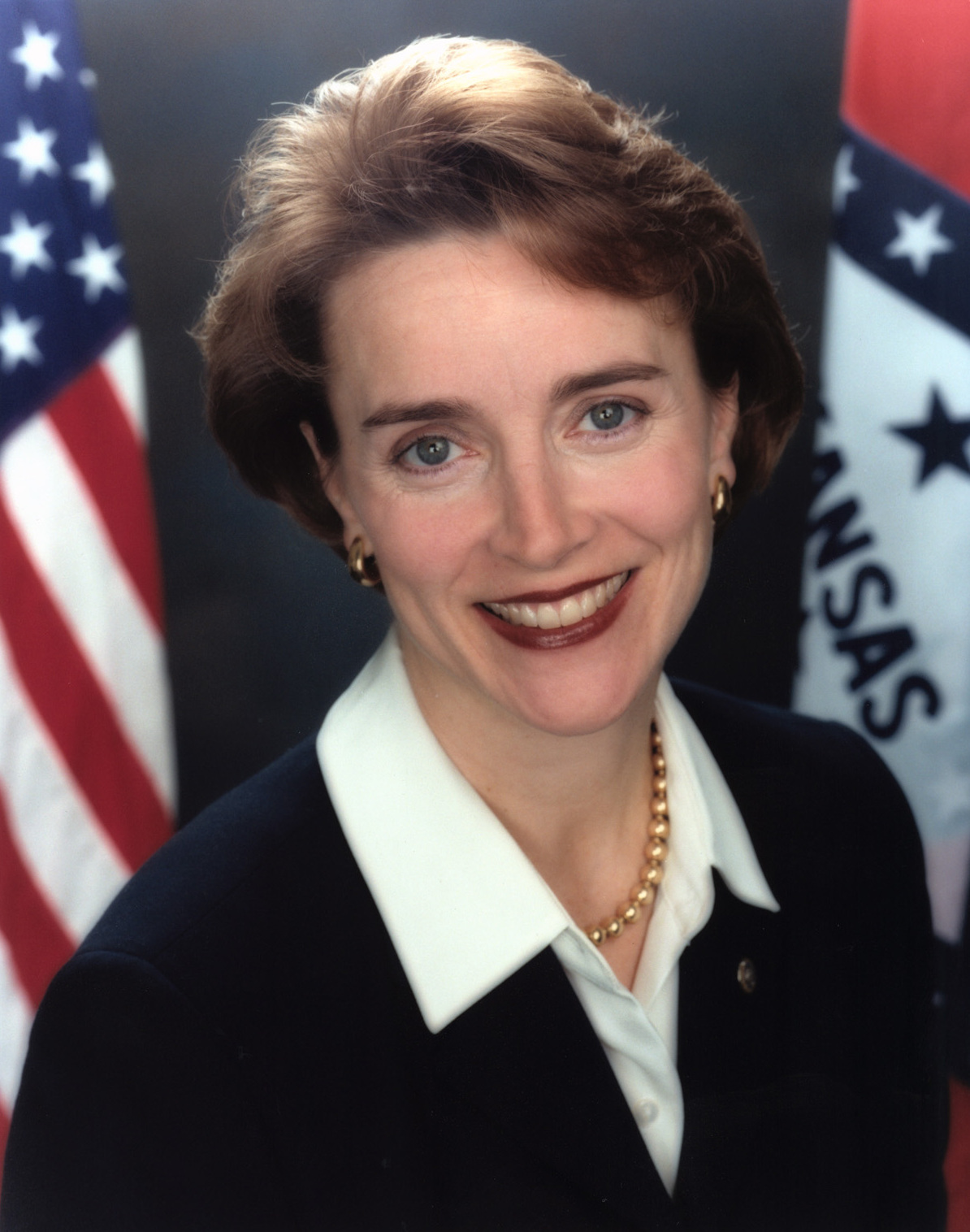

Nominee	Blanche Lincoln	Fay Boozman
Party	Democratic	Republican
Popular vote	385,878	295,870
Percentage	55.1%	42.4%
- County results Lincoln: 40–50% 50–60% 60–70% 70–80% 80–90% Boozman: 40–50% 50–60% 60–70%
U.S. senator before election
Dale Bumpers
Democratic
Elected U.S. Senator
Blanche Lincoln
Democratic

Incumbent Dale Bumpers retired. U.S. Representative Blanche Lincoln won the open seat.

Democratic primary
Party	Candidate	Votes	%
Democratic	Blanche Lincoln	145,009	45.5%
Democratic	Winston Bryant	87,183	27.4%
Democratic	Scott Ferguson	44,761	14.0%
Democratic	Nate Coulter	41,848	13.1%
Total votes		318,801	100.00%

Republican primary
Party	Candidate	Votes	%
Republican	Fay Boozman	128,929	78.0%
Republican	Tom Prince	44,006	22.0%
Total votes		172,035	100.00%

Arkansas Senate election 1998
Party	Candidate	Votes	%
Democratic	Blanche Lincoln	385,878	55.1%
Republican	Fay Boozman	295,870	42.2%
Reform	Charley E. Heffley	18,896	2.7%
Majority		90,008	12.9%
Turnout		700,644	100.0%
Democratic hold			

== California ==
California election
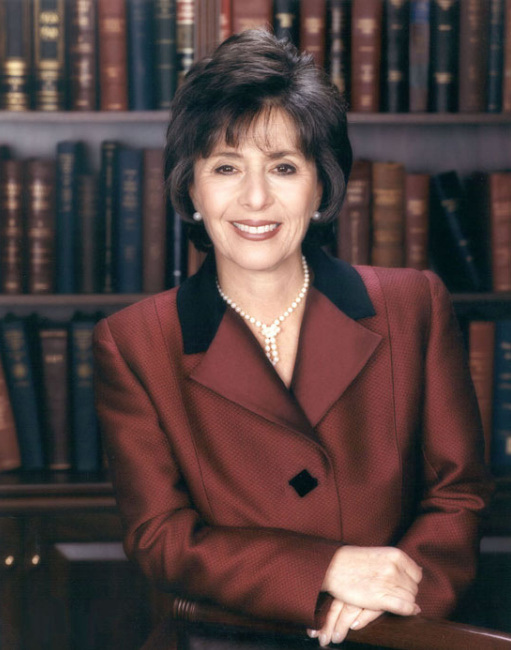

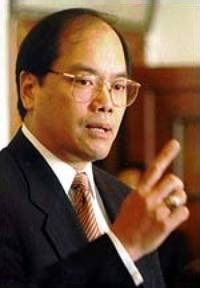
Nominee	Barbara Boxer	Matt Fong
Party	Democratic	Republican
Popular vote	4,411,705	3,576,351
Percentage	53.1%	43.0%
- County results Boxer: 40–50% 50–60% 60–70% 70–80% Fong: 40–50% 50–60% 60–70%
U.S. senator before election
Barbara Boxer
Democratic
Elected U.S. Senator
Barbara Boxer
Democratic

Incumbent Democrat Barbara Boxer won re-election to a second term.

1998 United States Senate Democratic primary, California
Candidate	Votes	%
Barbara Boxer (incumbent)	2,574,264	92.15%
John Pinkerton	219,250	7.85%
Total votes	2,793,514	100.00%

1998 United States Senate Republican primary, California
Candidate	Votes	%
Matt Fong	1,292,662	45.28%
Darrell Issa	1,142,567	40.02%
Frank Riggs	295,886	10.36%
John M. Brown	48,941	1.71%
Mark Raus	45,480	1.59%
Linh Dao	29,241	1.02%
Total votes	2,854,777	100.00%

1998 United States Senate primary, California (others)
Party	Candidate	Votes	%
Libertarian	Ted Brown	67,408	100.00%
Peace and Freedom	Ophie C. Beltran	52,306	100.00%
Reform	Timothy R. Erich	45,601	100.00%
American Independent	Joseph Perrin, Sr.	24,026	100.00%
Natural Law	Brian M. Rees	23,945	100.00%

Although the race was predicted to be fairly close, Boxer still defeated Fong by a ten-point margin. Boxer, as expected, did very well in Los Angeles County and the San Francisco Bay Area.

1998 United States Senate election, California
Party	Candidate	Votes	%
Democratic	Barbara Boxer (incumbent)	4,410,056	53.06%
Republican	Matt Fong	3,575,078	43.01%
Libertarian	Ted Brown	93,926	1.13%
Reform	Timothy R. Erich	82,918	1.00%
American Independent	Joseph Perrin, Sr.	54,699	0.66%
Peace and Freedom	Ophie C. Beltran	48,685	0.56%
Natural Law	Brian M. Rees	46,543	0.59%
Total votes		8,311,905	100.00%
Turnout			
Democratic hold			

== Colorado ==
Colorado election
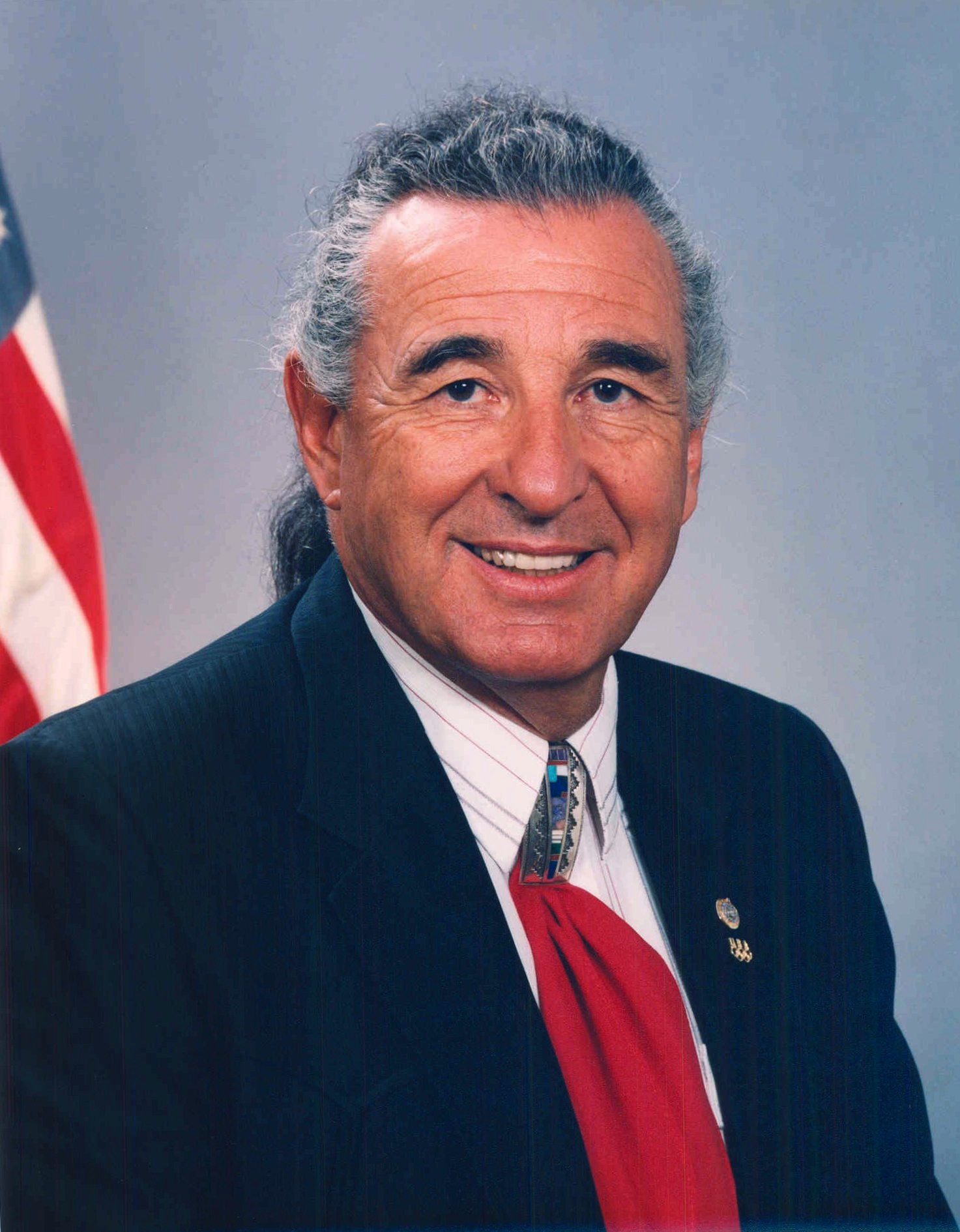

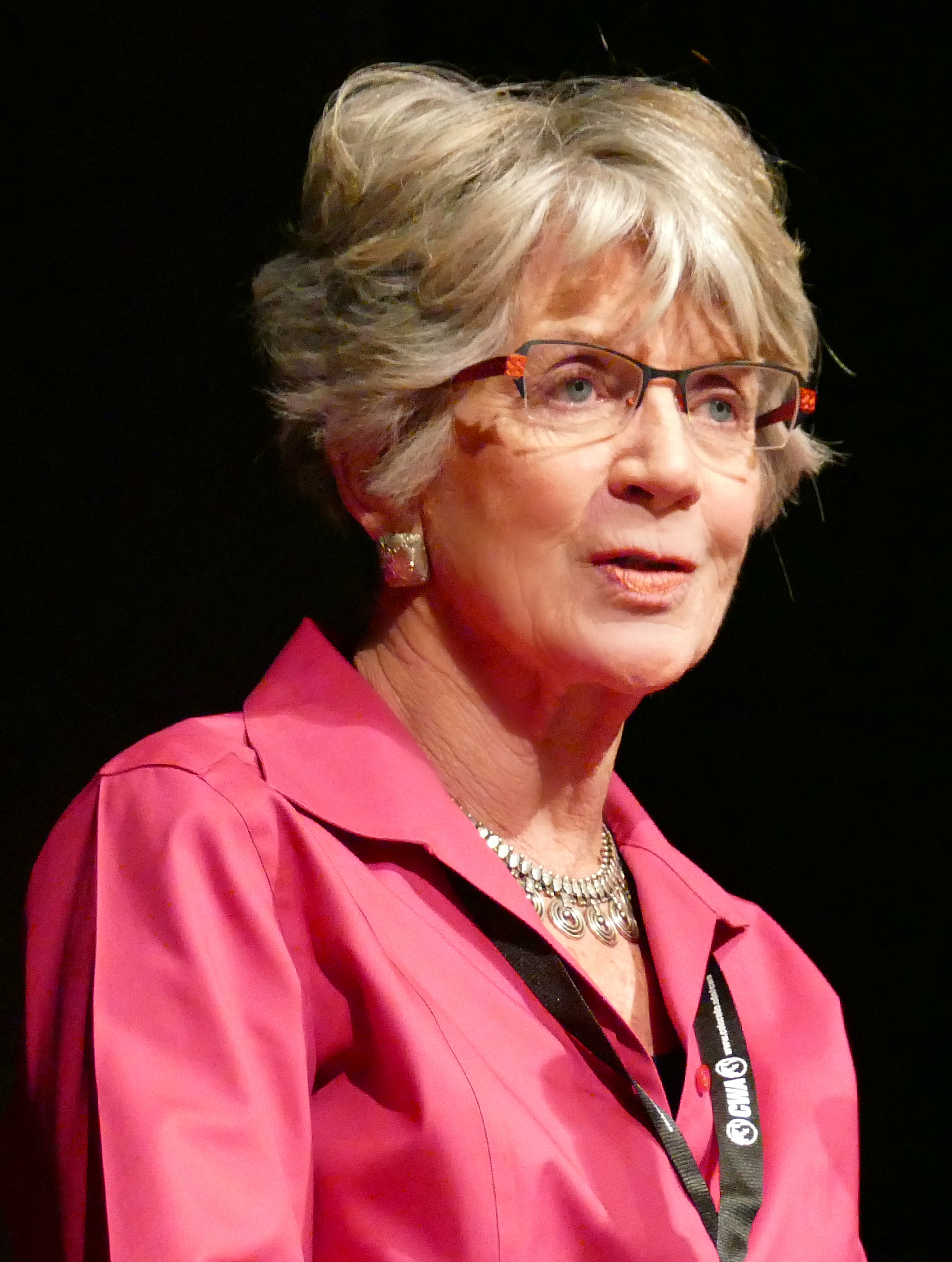
Nominee	Ben Nighthorse Campbell	Dottie Lamm
Party	Republican	Democratic
Popular vote	829,370	464,754
Percentage	62.5%	35.0%
- County results Nighthorse Campbell: 50–60% 60–70% 70–80% 80–90% Lamm: 50–60%
U.S. senator before election
Ben Nighthorse Campbell
Republican
Elected U.S. Senator
Ben Nighthorse Campbell
Republican

Incumbent Republican Ben Nighthorse Campbell won re-election to a second term.

Colorado Democratic primary
Party	Candidate	Votes	%
Democratic	Dottie Lamm	84,929	57.98%
Democratic	Gil Romero	61,548	42.02%
Total votes		146,477	100.00%

Colorado Republican primary
Party	Candidate	Votes	%
Republican	Ben Nighthorse Campbell (incumbent)	154,702	70.62%
Republican	Bill Eggert	64,347	29.38%
Total votes		219,049	100.00%

Campbell, who was elected in 1992 as a Democrat, switched parties after the 1994 Republican Revolution. He faced a primary challenger, but won with over 70% of the vote. In the general election, Democratic nominee Dottie Lamm criticized Campbell of flip-flopping from being a moderate liberal to moderate conservative. Throughout the entire campaign, Lamm sent out negative attack advertisements about Campbell.

General election
Party	Candidate	Votes	%	±%
Republican	Ben Nighthorse Campbell (incumbent)	829,370	62.49%	+19.78%
Democratic	Dottie Lamm	464,754	35.02%	−16.76%
Libertarian	David S. Segal	14,024	1.06%	+1.06%
Constitution	Kevin Swanson	9,775	0.74%	
Natural Law	Jeffrey Peckham	4,101	0.31%	
Independent	John Heckman	3,230	0.24%	
Independent	Gary Swing	1,981	0.15%	
Majority		364,616	27.47%	+18.40%
Turnout		1,327,235		
Republican hold		Swing		

== Connecticut ==
Connecticut election
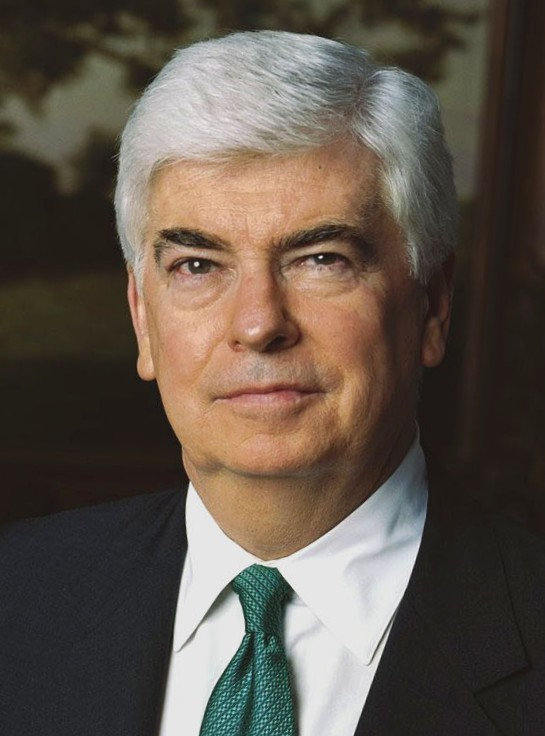

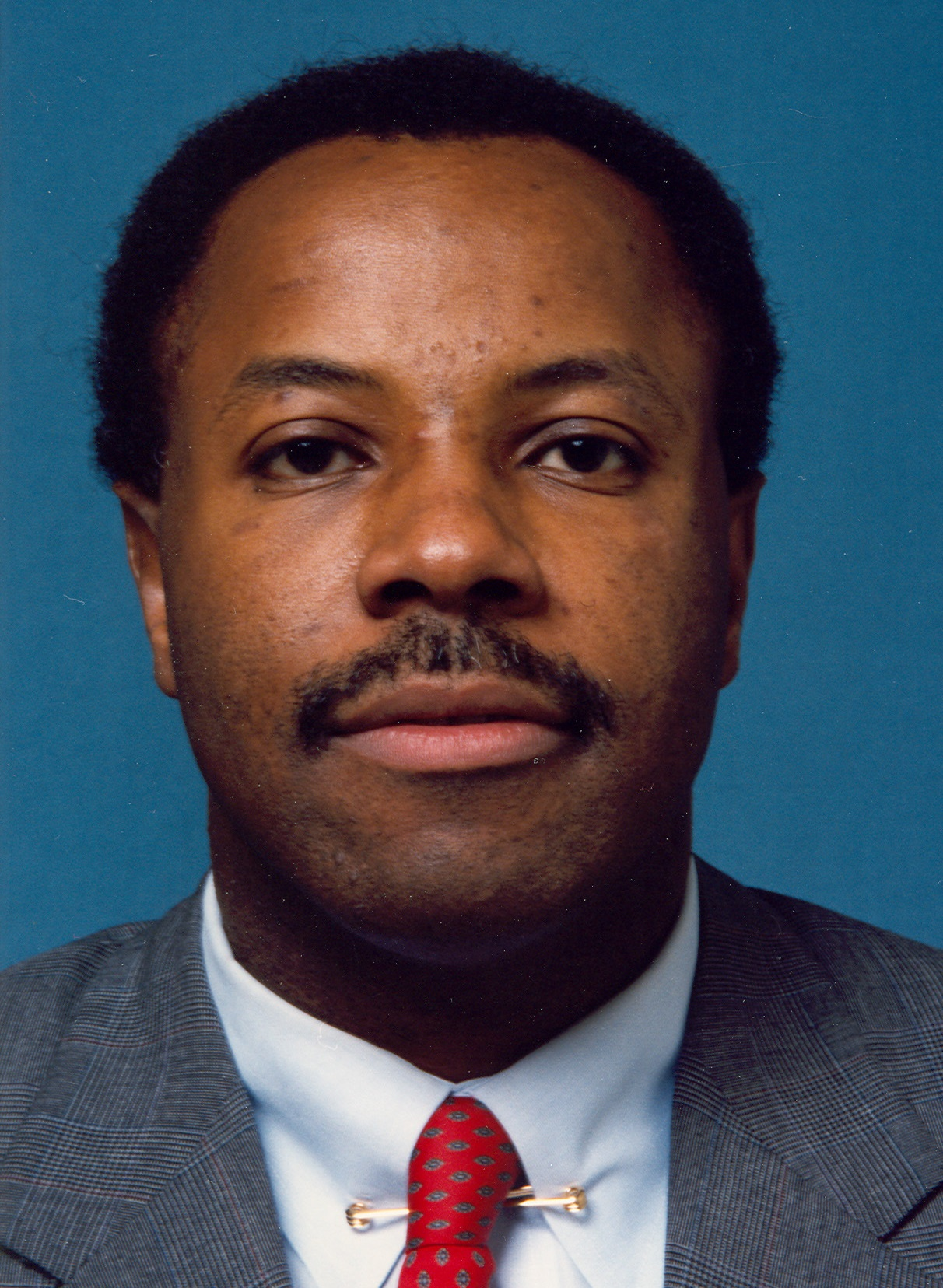
Nominee	Chris Dodd	Gary A. Franks
Party	Democratic	Republican
Popular vote	628,306	312,177
Percentage	65.2%	32.4%
- Dodd: 50–60% 60–70% 70–80% 80–90% Franks: 40–50% 50–60%
U.S. senator before election
Chris Dodd
Democratic
Elected U.S. Senator
Chris Dodd
Democratic

Incumbent Democrat Chris Dodd won re-election for a fourth term against former Republican U.S. congressman Gary A. Franks.

Connecticut Senate election 1998
Party	Candidate	Votes	%
Democratic	Chris Dodd (incumbent)	628,306	65.2%
Republican	Gary A. Franks	312,177	32.4%
Concerned Citizens	William Kozak	12,261	1.3%
Independent	Lois A. Grasso	6,517	0.7%
Libertarian	Wildey J. Moore	5,196	0.5%
Majority		316,129	32.8%
Turnout		964,457	100.0%
Democratic hold			

== Florida ==
Florida election
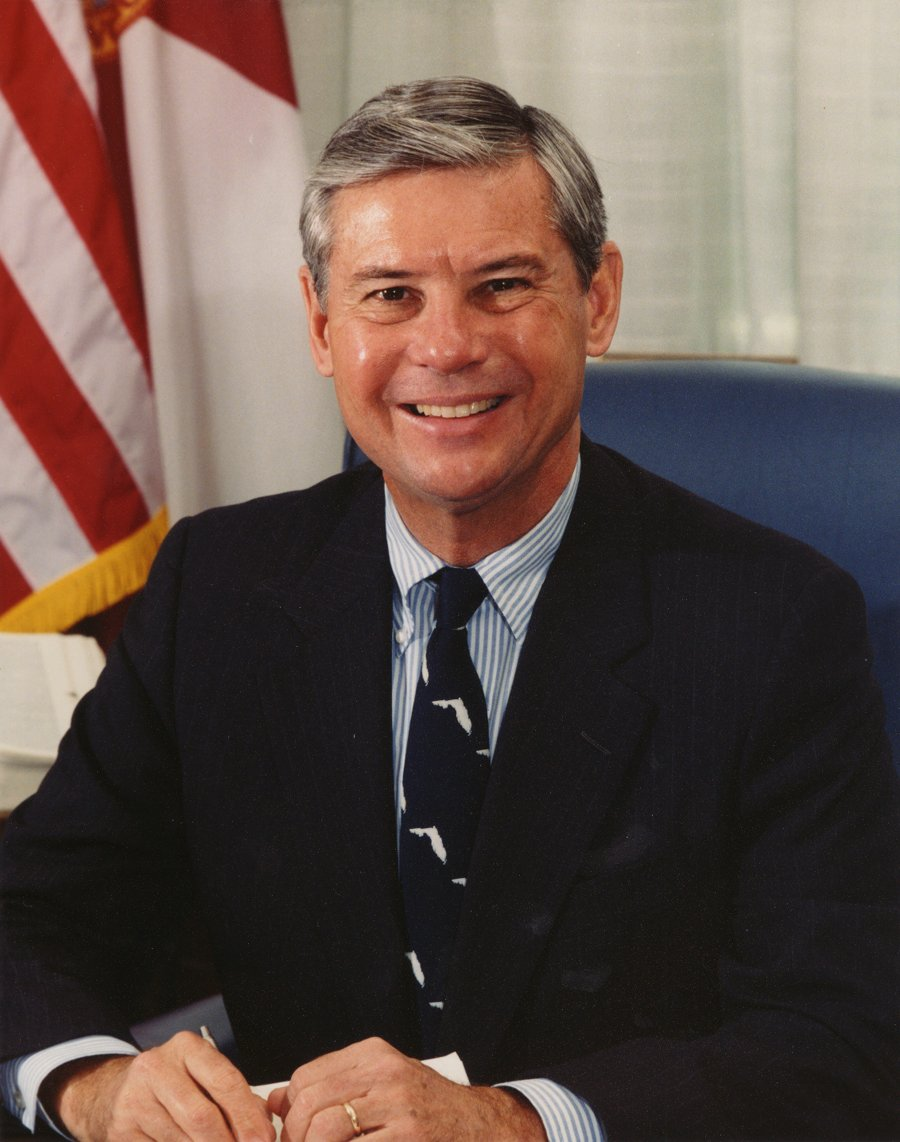

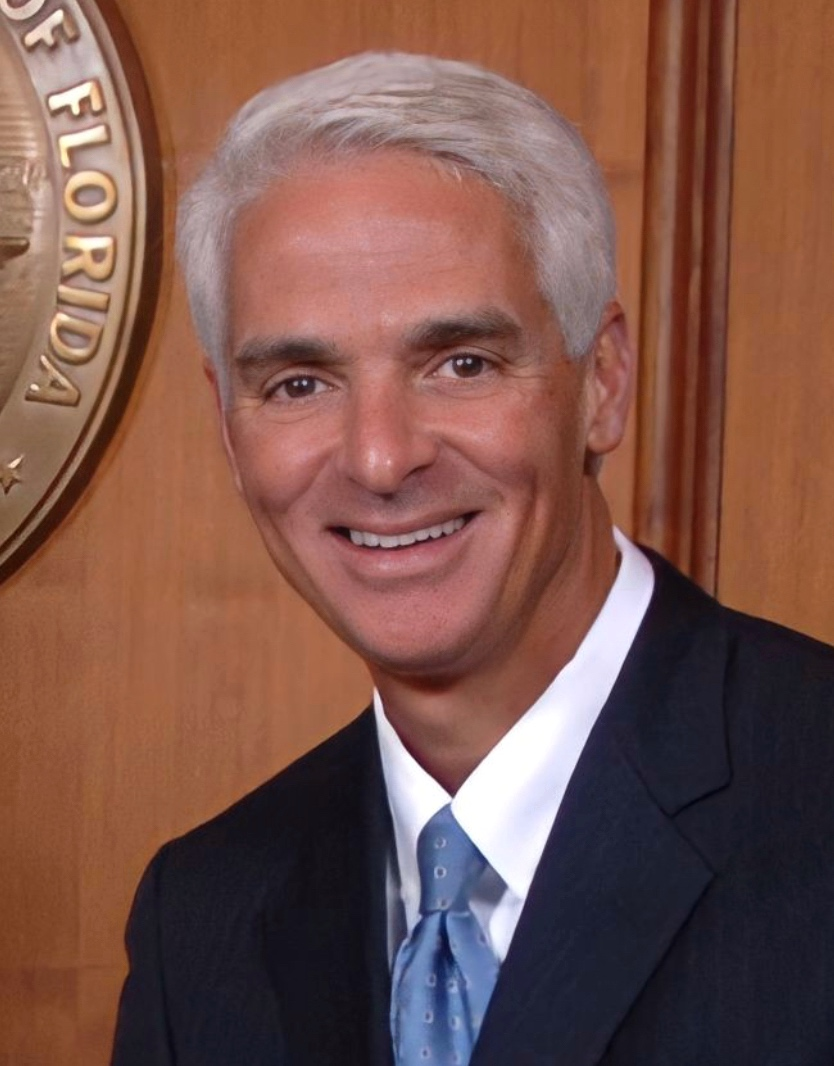
Nominee	Bob Graham	Charlie Crist
Party	Democratic	Republican
Popular vote	2,436,407	1,463,755
Percentage	62.5%	37.5%
- Graham: 50–60% 60–70% 70–80% 80–90% Crist: 50–60% 60–70%
U.S. senator before election
Bob Graham
Democratic
Elected U.S. Senator
Bob Graham
Democratic

Incumbent Democrat Bob Graham won re-election to a third term.

Democratic primary
Party	Candidate	Votes	%
Democratic	Bob Graham (incumbent)	909,349	100.00%

Republican primary
Party	Candidate	Votes	%
Republican	Charlie Crist	365,894	66.40%
Republican	Andy Martin	184,739	33.60%
Total votes		550,633	100.00%

Graham defeated Crist in a landslide, as Crist won just four counties in the state. There were no third party or independent candidates.

General election
Party	Candidate	Votes	%	±%
Democratic	Daniel Robert Graham (incumbent)	2,436,407	62.47%	−2.93%
Republican	Charles Joseph Crist, Jr.	1,463,755	37.53%	+2.94%
Majority		972,652	24.94%	−5.87%
Turnout		3,900,162	46.84%	
Total votes		3,900,162	100.00%	
Democratic hold				

== Georgia ==
Georgia election
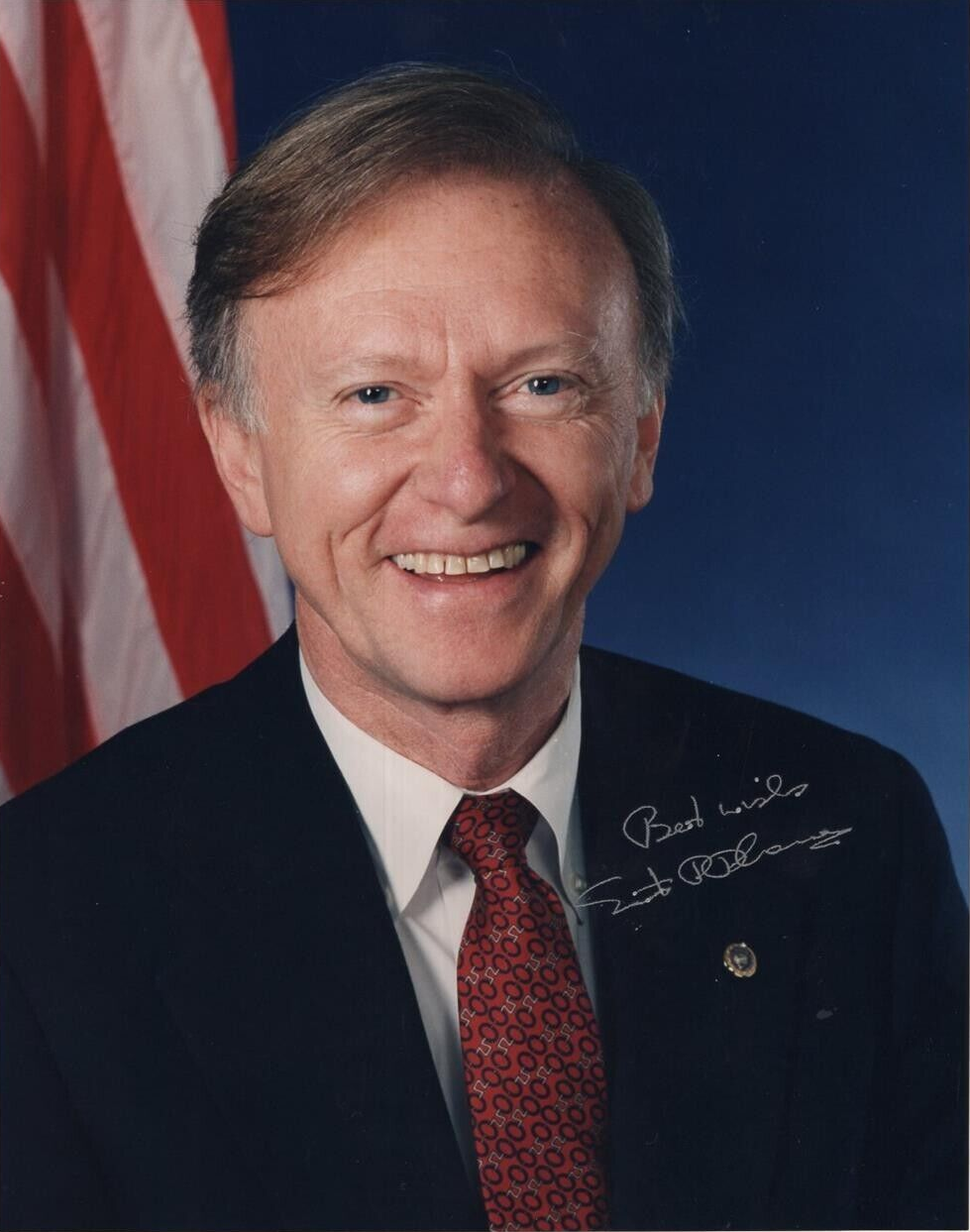

Nominee	Paul Coverdell	Michael Coles
Party	Republican	Democratic
Popular vote	918,540	791,904
Percentage	52.37%	45.15%
- County results Coverdell: 40–50% 50–60% 60–70% 70–80% Coles: 40–50% 50–60% 60–70% 70–80%
U.S. senator before election
Paul Coverdell
Republican
Elected U.S. Senator
Paul Coverdell
Republican

Incumbent Republican Paul Coverdell won re-election to a second term.

1998 Georgia United States Senate election
Party	Candidate	Votes	%
Republican	Paul Coverdell (incumbent)	918,540	52.37%
Democratic	Michael Coles	791,904	45.15%
Libertarian	Bert Loftman	43,467	2.48%
Socialist Workers	Daniel Fein (write-in)	42	0.00%
Majority		126,636	7.22%
Turnout		1,753,953	
Republican hold			

== Hawaii ==
Hawaii election
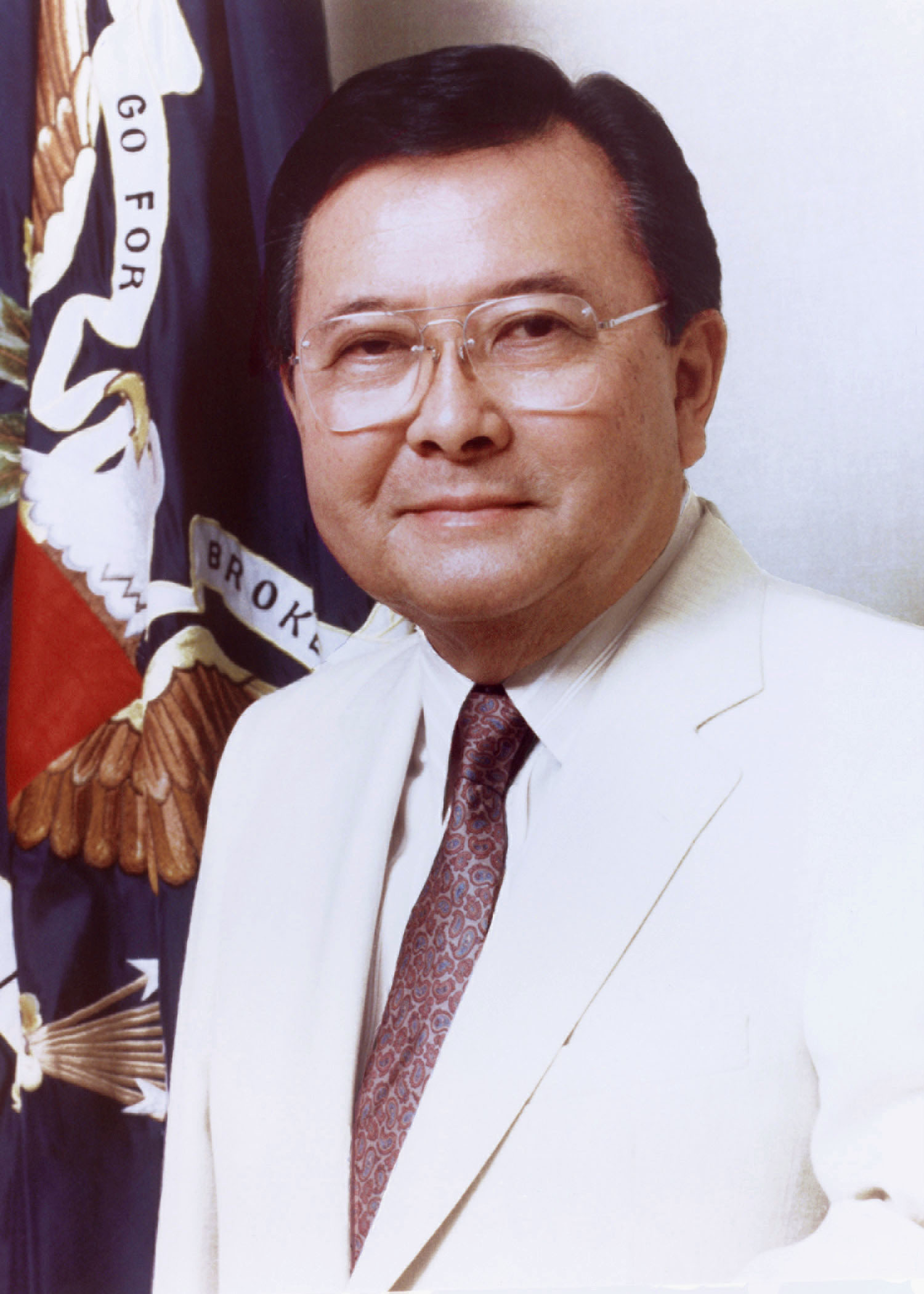

Nominee	Daniel Inouye	Crystal Young
Party	Democratic	Republican
Popular vote	315,252	70,964
Percentage	79.2%	17.8%
- County results Inouye: 70–80% 80–90%
U.S. senator before election
Daniel Inouye
Democratic
Elected U.S. Senator
Daniel Inouye
Democratic

Incumbent Democrat Daniel Inouye won re-election to a seventh term over Republican legislative aide Crystal Young.

General election
Party	Candidate	Votes	%
Democratic	Daniel Inouye (incumbent)	315,252	79.2%
Republican	Crystal Young	70,964	17.8%
Libertarian	Lloyd Jeffrey Mallan	11,908	3.0%
Majority		244,288	61.4%
Turnout		398,124	100.0%
Democratic hold			

== Idaho ==
Idaho election
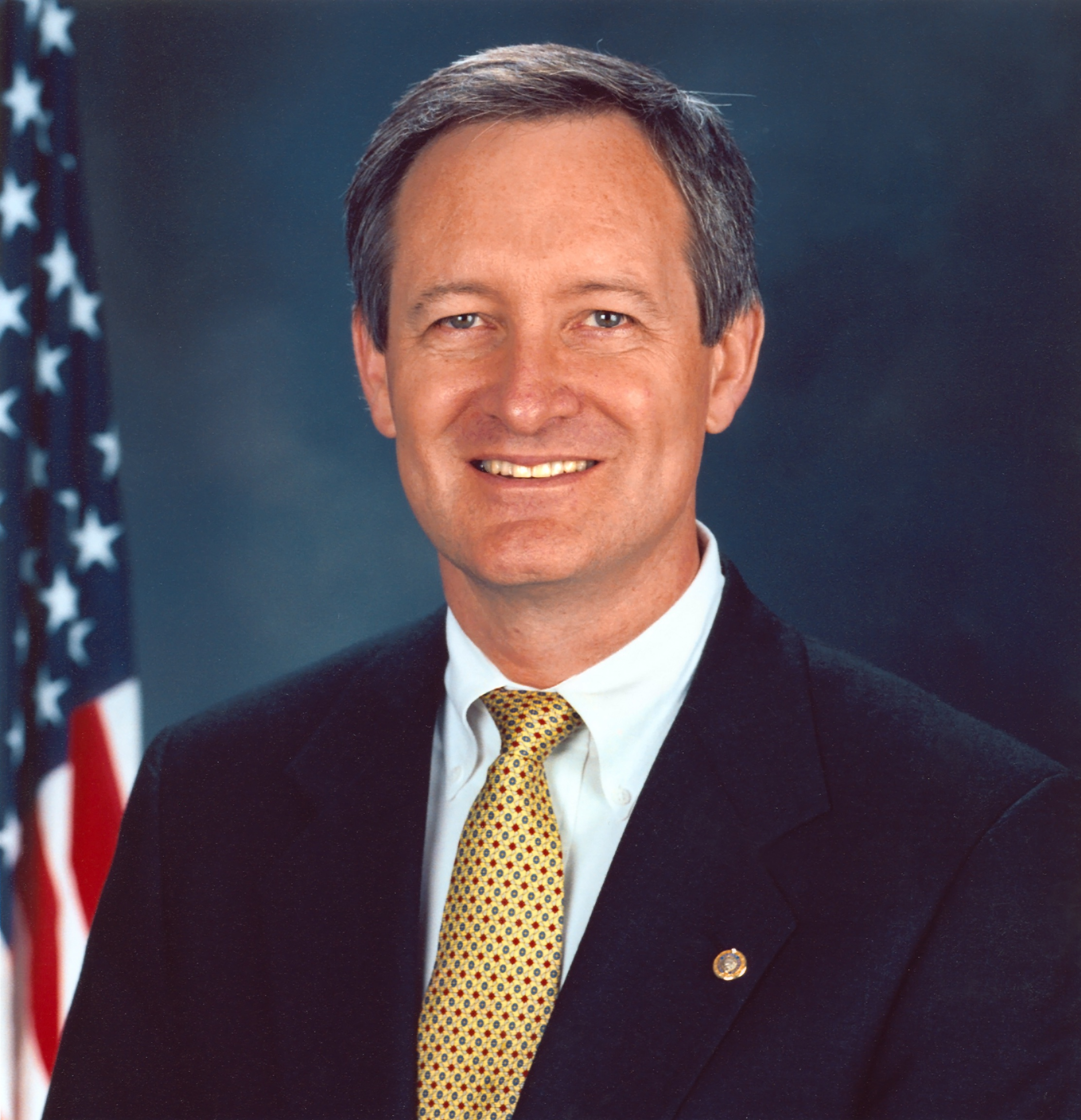

Nominee	Mike Crapo	Bill Mauk
Party	Republican	Democratic
Popular vote	262,966	107,375
Percentage	69.5%	28.4%
- County results Crapo: 40–50% 50–60% 60–70% 70–80% 80–90% >90%
U.S. senator before election
Dirk Kempthorne
Republican
Elected U.S. Senator
Mike Crapo
Republican

Incumbent Republican Dirk Kempthorne decided to retire after one term, to run for governor. Republican nominee Mike Crapo won the open seat.

Democratic primary
Party	Candidate	Votes	%
Democratic	Bill Mauk	22,503	100.00%
Total votes		22,503	100.00%

Republican primary
Party	Candidate	Votes	%
Republican	Mike Crapo	110,205	87.27%
Republican	Matt Lambert	16,075	12.73%
Total votes		126,280	100.00%

General election
Party	Candidate	Votes	%	±%
Republican	Mike Crapo	262,966	69.54%	+13.01%
Democratic	Bill Mauk	107,375	28.39%	−15.08%
Natural Law	George J. Mansfeld	7,833	2.07%	
Majority		155,591	41.14%	+28.10%
Turnout		378,174		
Republican hold				

== Illinois ==
Illinois election
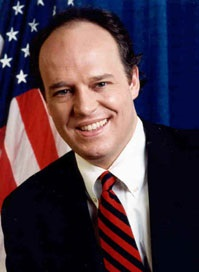

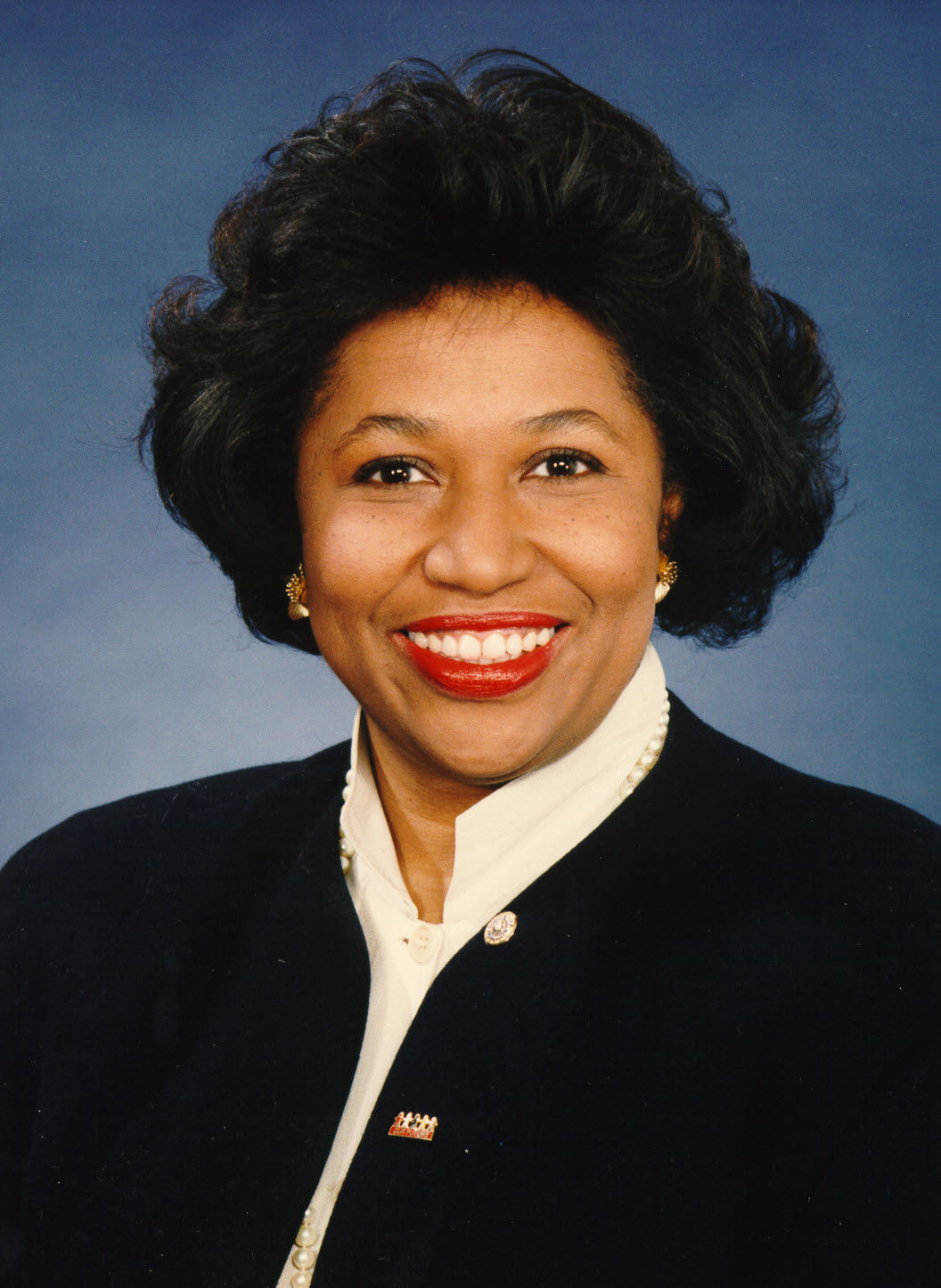
Nominee	Peter Fitzgerald	Carol Moseley Braun
Party	Republican	Democratic
Popular vote	1,709,042	1,610,496
Percentage	50.4%	47.4%
- County results Fitzgerald: 40–50% 50–60% 60–70% 70–80% Braun: 40–50% 50–60% 60–70%
U.S. senator before election
Carol Moseley Braun
Democratic
Elected U.S. Senator
Peter Fitzgerald
Republican

Incumbent Democrat Carol Moseley Braun ran for re-election, despite controversies in her first term. Republican State Senator Peter Fitzgerald won his party's primary with a slim margin of victory.

He ended up defeating the incumbent, with a margin of victory of approximately 3%. Peter Fitzgerald won all but five counties.

During Moseley Braun's term as U.S. Senator, she was plagued by several major controversies. Moseley Braun was the subject of a 1993 Federal Election Commission investigation over $249,000 in unaccounted-for campaign funds. The agency found some small violations, but took no action against Moseley Braun, citing a lack of resources. Moseley Braun only admitted to bookkeeping errors. The Justice Department turned down two requests for investigations from the IRS.

In 1996, Moseley Braun made a private trip to Nigeria, where she met with dictator Sani Abacha. Despite U.S. sanctions against that country, due to Abacha's actions, the Senator did not notify, nor register her trip with, the State Department. She subsequently defended Abacha's human rights records in Congress.

Peter Fitzgerald, a state senator, won the Republican primary, defeating Illinois Comptroller Loleta Didrickson with 51.8% of the vote, to Didrickson's 48.2%. Fitzgerald spent nearly $7 million in the Republican primary. He had a major financial advantage, as he was a multimillionaire. He ended up spending $12 million in his election victory.

In September, Moseley Braun created controversy again by using the word "nigger" to describe how she claims to be a victim of racism.

Most polls over the first few months showed Moseley Braun trailing badly. However, after she was helped in the final month by notable Democrats such as First Lady Hillary Clinton and U.S. Congressman Luis V. Gutierrez, three polls published in the last week showed her within the margin of error, and, in one poll, running even with Fitzgerald.

Moseley Braun was narrowly defeated by Republican Peter Fitzgerald. Moseley Braun only won five of Illinois's 102 counties. Despite this, the race was kept close by Moseley running up massive margins in Cook County, home of Chicago. However, it was not quite enough to win.

1998 Illinois United States Senate election
Party	Candidate	Votes	%	±%
Republican	Peter Fitzgerald	1,709,041	50.35%	+7.4%
Democratic	Carol Moseley Braun (incumbent)	1,610,496	47.44%	−5.6%
Reform	Don Torgersen	74,704	2.20%	0.00%
US Taxpayers	Raymond Stalker	280	0.01%	0.00%
Majority		98,545	2.91%	0.00%
Turnout		3,394,521		
Republican gain from Democratic		Swing		

== Indiana ==
Indiana election
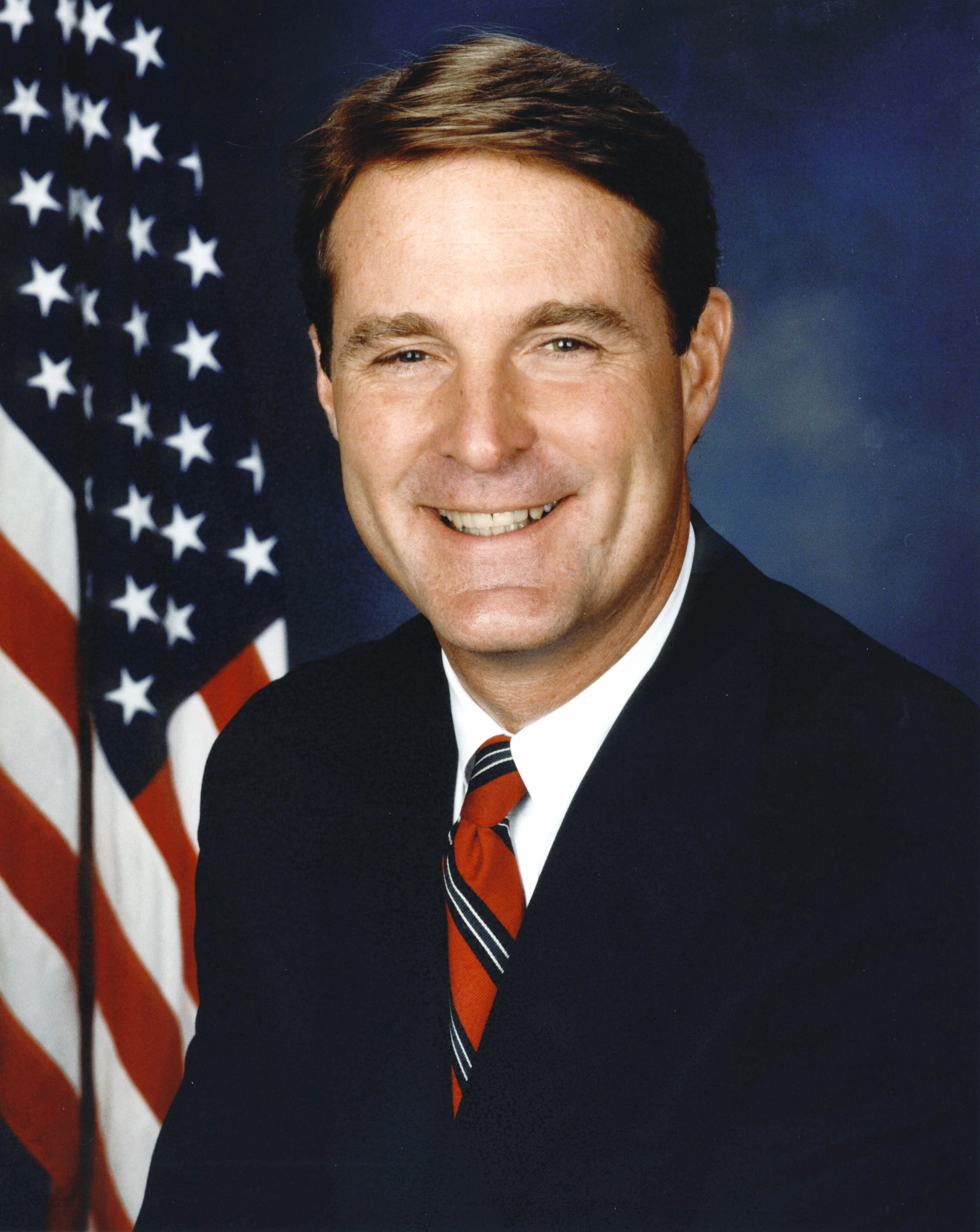

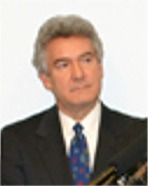
Nominee	Evan Bayh	Paul Helmke
Party	Democratic	Republican
Popular vote	1,012,244	552,732
Percentage	63.7%	34.8%
- County results Bayh: 50–60% 60–70% 70–80% 80-90% Helmke: 40–50%
U.S. senator before election
Dan Coats
Republican
Elected U.S. Senator
Evan Bayh
Democratic

Incumbent Republican Dan Coats decided to retire instead of seeking a second full term. Democratic nominee, former governor Evan Bayh, won the open seat his father once held.

General election
Party	Candidate	Votes	%	±%
Democratic	Evan Bayh	1,012,244	63.7%	
Republican	Paul Helmke	552,732	34.8%	
Libertarian	Rebecca Sink-Burris	23,641	1.5%	
Majority		459,512		
Turnout		1,588,617		
Democratic gain from Republican		Swing		

== Iowa ==
Iowa election
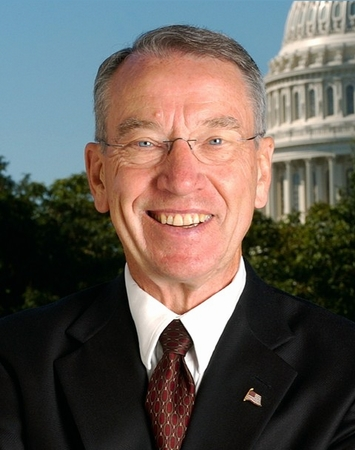

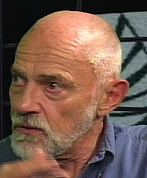
Nominee	Chuck Grassley	David Osterberg
Party	Republican	Democratic
Popular vote	648,480	289,049
Percentage	68.41%	30.49%
- County results Grassley: 50-60% 60-70% 70-80% 80-90% >90%
U.S. senator before election
Chuck Grassley
Republican
Elected U.S. Senator
Chuck Grassley
Republican

Incumbent Republican Chuck Grassley sought re-election to a fourth term in the United States Senate, facing off against former state representative David Osterberg, who won the Democratic nomination unopposed. Grassley had not faced a competitive election since 1980; this year proved no different, and Grassley crushed Osterberg to win a fourth term.

Democratic primary
Party	Candidate	Votes	%
Democratic	David Osterberg	86,064	99.45%
Democratic	Write-ins	476	0.55%
Total votes		86,540	100.00%

Republican primary
Party	Candidate	Votes	%
Republican	Chuck Grassley (incumbent)	149,943	99.72%
Republican	Write-ins	419	0.28%
Total votes		150,362	100.00%

1998 United States Senate election in Iowa
Party	Candidate	Votes	%	±%
Republican	Chuck Grassley (incumbent)	648,480	68.41%	−1.20%
Democratic	David Osterberg	289,049	30.49%	+3.29%
Natural Law	Susan Marcus	7,561	0.80%	−0.47%
Socialist Workers	Margaret Trowe	2,542	0.27%	+0.16%
Write-ins		275	0.03%	
Majority		359,431	37.92%	−4.50%
Turnout		947,907		
Republican hold				

== Kansas ==
Kansas election
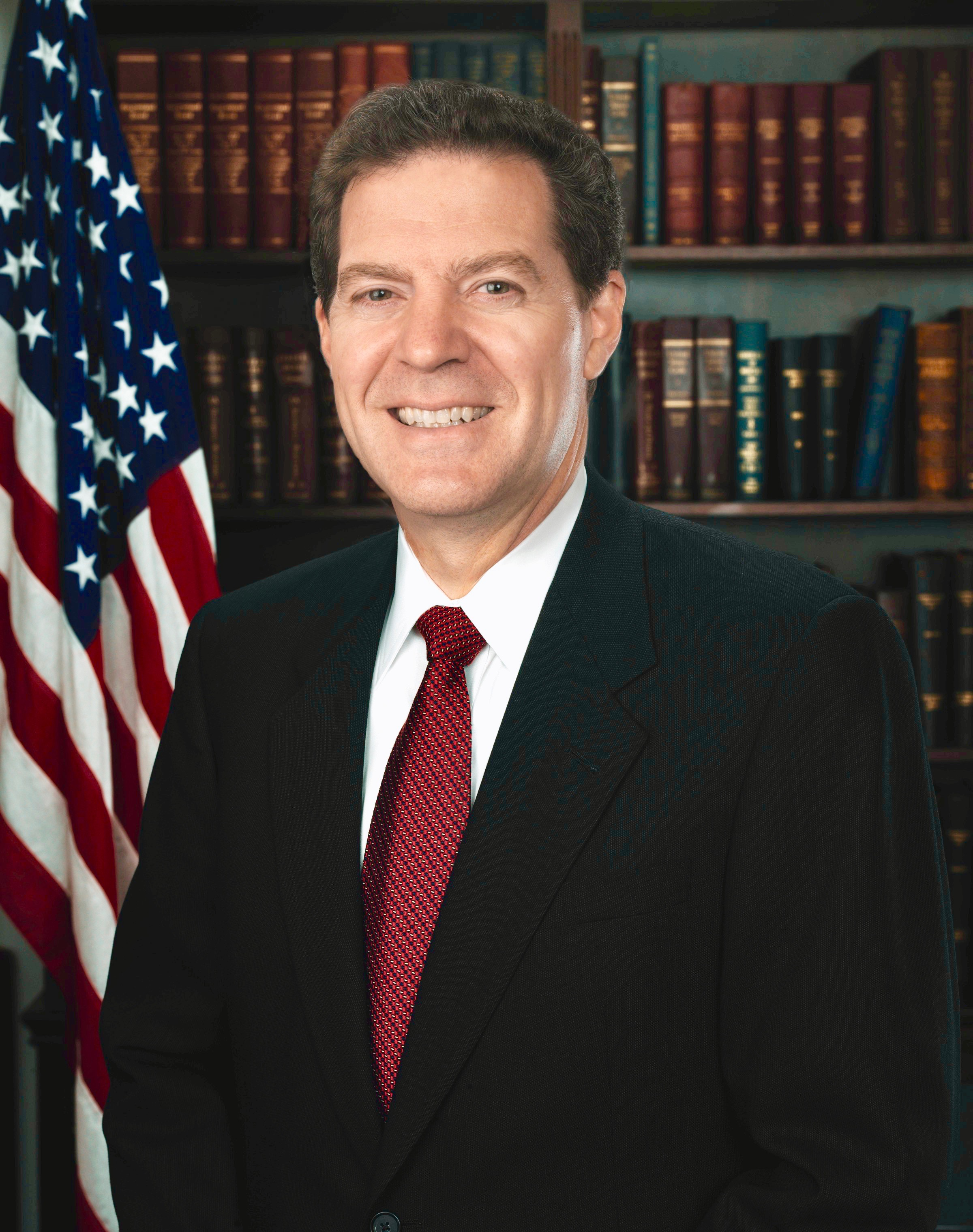

Nominee	Sam Brownback	Paul Feleciano
Party	Republican	Democratic
Popular vote	474,639	229,718
Percentage	65.3%	31.6%
- County results Brownback: 50-60% 60-70% 70-80% 80-90% Feleciano: 50–60%
U.S. senator before election
Sam Brownback
Republican
Elected U.S. Senator
Sam Brownback
Republican

Incumbent Republican Sam Brownback won re-election to his first full term. Brownback was first elected in a special election held in 1996, when then-Senator Bob Dole resigned to campaign for U.S. president, after 27 years in the Senate. This would have been Dole's seventh term in office, had he remained in his seat.

Democratic primary
Party	Candidate	Votes	%
Democratic	Paul Feleciano, Jr.	58,097	58.73%
Democratic	Todd Covault	40,825	41.27%
Total votes		98,922	100.00%

Republican Party primary
Party	Candidate	Votes	%
Republican	Sam Brownback (incumbent)	255,747	100.00%
Total votes		255,747	100.00%

General election
Party	Candidate	Votes	%	±%
Republican	Sam Brownback (incumbent)	474,639	65.27%	+11.35%
Democratic	Paul Feleciano, Jr.	229,718	31.59%	−11.74%
Libertarian	Tom Oyler	11,545	1.59%	
Reform	Alvin Bauman	11,334	1.56%	−1.20%
Majority		244,921	33.68%	+23.10%
Turnout		727,236		
Republican hold				

== Kentucky ==
Kentucky election
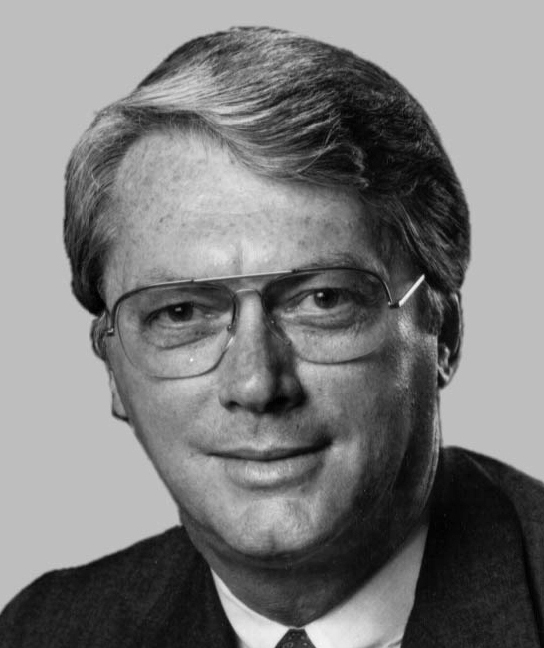

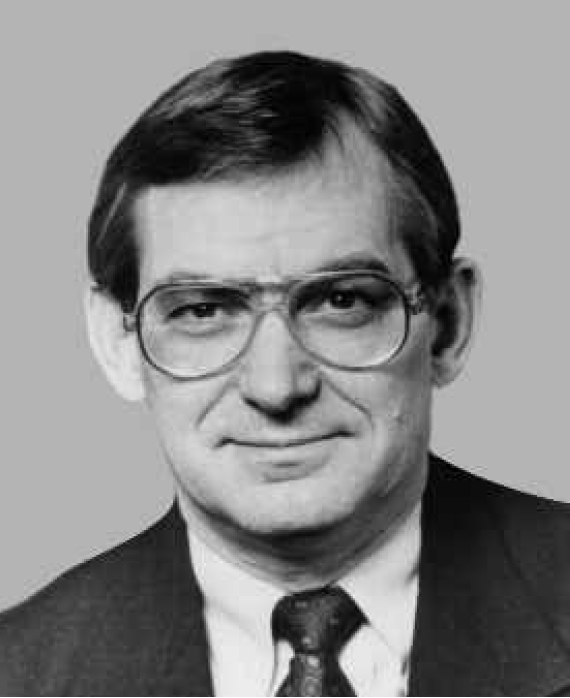
Nominee	Jim Bunning	Scotty Baesler
Party	Republican	Democratic
Popular vote	569,817	563,051
Percentage	49.8%	49.2%
- County results Bunning: 40–50% 50–60% 60–70% 70–80% Baesler: 40–50% 50–60% 60–70% 70–80%
U.S. senator before election
Wendell Ford
Democratic
Elected U.S. Senator
Jim Bunning
Republican

Incumbent Democratic U.S Senator Wendell Ford decided to retire, instead of seeking a fifth term. Republican Representative Jim Bunning won the open seat.

Democratic primary
Party	Candidate	Votes	%
Democratic	Scotty Baesler	194,125	34.16%
Democratic	Charlie Owen	166,472	29.29%
Democratic	Steve Henry	156,576	27.55%
Democratic	Jim Brown	19,975	3.51%
Democratic	David L. Williams	16,366	2.88%
Democratic	Ken Buchanan Thompson	14,778	2.60%
Total votes		568,292	100.00%

Republican primary
Party	Candidate	Votes	%
Republican	Jim Bunning	152,493	74.28%
Republican	Barry Metcalf	52,798	25.72%
Total votes		205,291	100.00%

General election
Party	Candidate	Votes	%	±%
Republican	Jim Bunning	569,817	49.75%	+13.94%
Democratic	Scotty Baesler	563,051	49.16%	−13.73%
Reform	Charles R. Arbegust	12,546	1.10%	
Majority		6,766	0.59%	−26.48%
Total votes		1,145,414	100.00%	
Republican gain from Democratic		Swing		

== Louisiana ==
Louisiana election
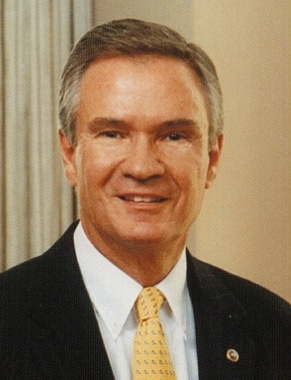

Nominee	John Breaux	Jim Donelon
Party	Democratic	Republican
Popular vote	620,502	306,616
Percentage	64.0%	31.6%
- Parish results Breaux: 40–50% 50–60% 60–70% 70–80% Donelon: 50–60%
U.S. senator before election
John Breaux
Democratic
Elected U.S. Senator
John Breaux
Democratic

Incumbent Democrat John Breaux won re-election to a third term. As of 2022, this is the last time the Democrats have won the Class 3 Senate Seat from Louisiana.

1998 Louisiana United States Senate election
Party	Candidate	Votes	%	±%
Democratic	John Breaux (incumbent)	620,502	64.0%	
Republican	Jim Donelon	306,616	31.6%	
Independent	Raymond Brown	12,203	1.3%	
Independent	Sam Houston Melton	9,893	1.0%	
Independent	Darryl Paul Ward	7,964	0.8%	
Independent	L. D. Knox	6,366	0.7%	
Independent	Jeffrey H. Diket	3,227	0.3%	
Independent	Martin A. Rosenthal	2,398	0.3%	
Majority		313,886	32.4%	
Turnout		969,169	100.0%	
Democratic hold				

== Maryland ==
Maryland election
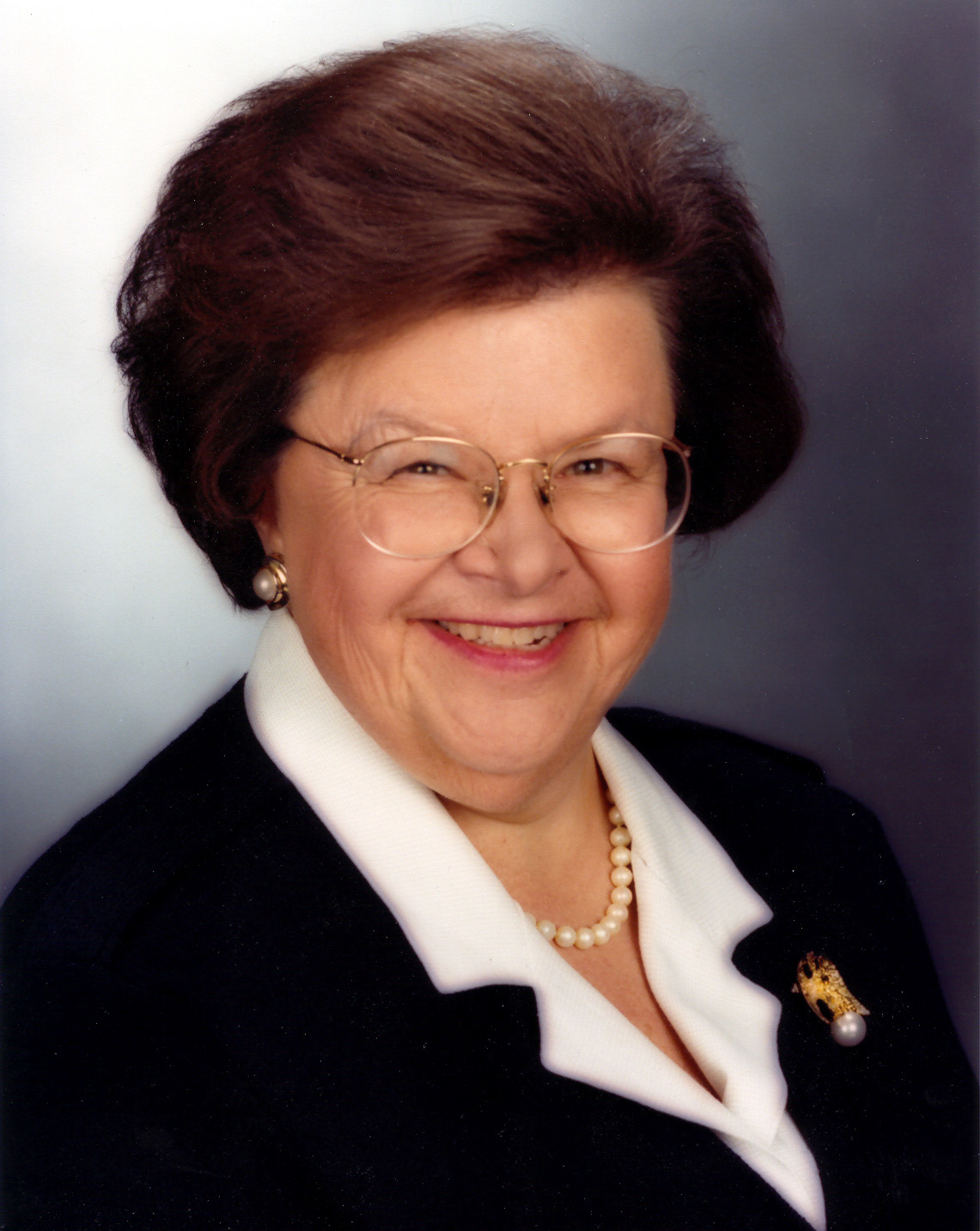

Nominee	Barbara Mikulski	Ross Pierpont
Party	Democratic	Republican
Popular vote	1,062,810	444,637
Percentage	70.5%	29.5%
- County results Mikulski: 50–60% 60–70% 70–80% 80–90% Pierpont: 50–60%
U.S. senator before election
Barbara Mikulski
Democratic
Elected U.S. Senator
Barbara Mikulski
Democratic

Incumbent Democrat Barbara Mikulski won re-election to a third term.

Democratic primary
Party	Candidate	Votes	%
Democratic	Barbara A. Mikulski (incumbent)	349,382	84.36%
Democratic	Ann L. Mallory	43,120	10.41%
Democratic	Kauko H. Kokkonen	21,658	5.23%
Total votes		414,160	100.00%

Republican primary
Party	Candidate	Votes	%
Republican	Ross Z. Pierpont	32,691	18.40%
Republican	John Taylor	22,855	12.87%
Republican	Michael Gloth	19,926	11.22%
Republican	Kenneth Wayman	16,505	9.29%
Republican	Bradlyn McClanahan	16,439	9.25%
Republican	Howard David Greyber	16,177	9.11%
Republican	John Stafford	15,031	8.46%
Republican	George Liebmann	14,440	8.13%
Republican	Barry Steve Asbury	11,881	6.69%
Republican	Thomas Scott	11,707	6.59%
Total votes		177,652	100.00%

1998 United States Senate election in Maryland
Party	Candidate	Votes	%	±%
Democratic	Barbara A. Mikulski (incumbent)	1,062,810	70.50%	−0.51%
Republican	Ross Z. Pierpont	444,637	29.50%	+0.51%
Majority		618,173	41.01%	−1.02%
Total votes		1,507,447	100.00%	
Democratic hold				

== Missouri ==
Missouri election
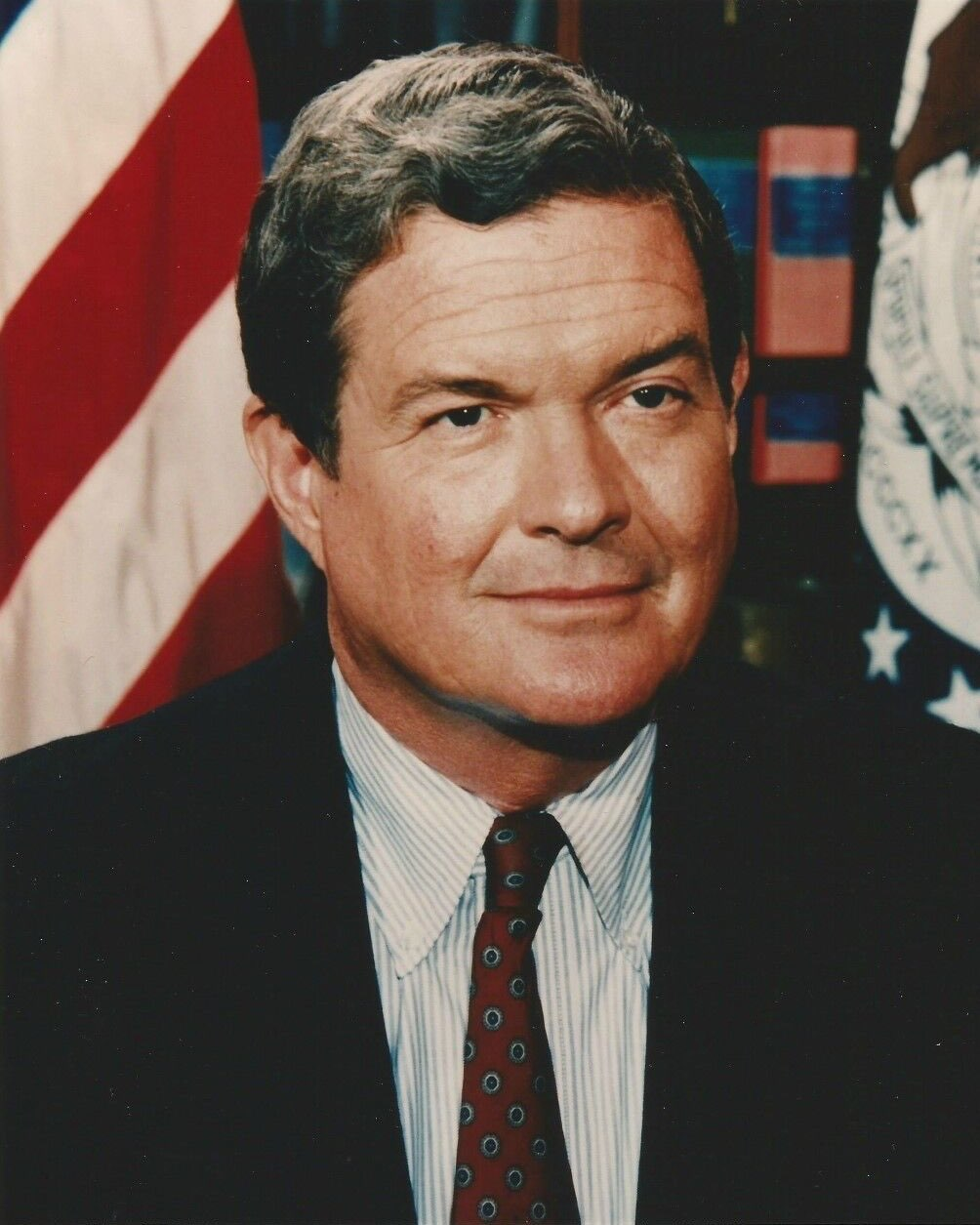

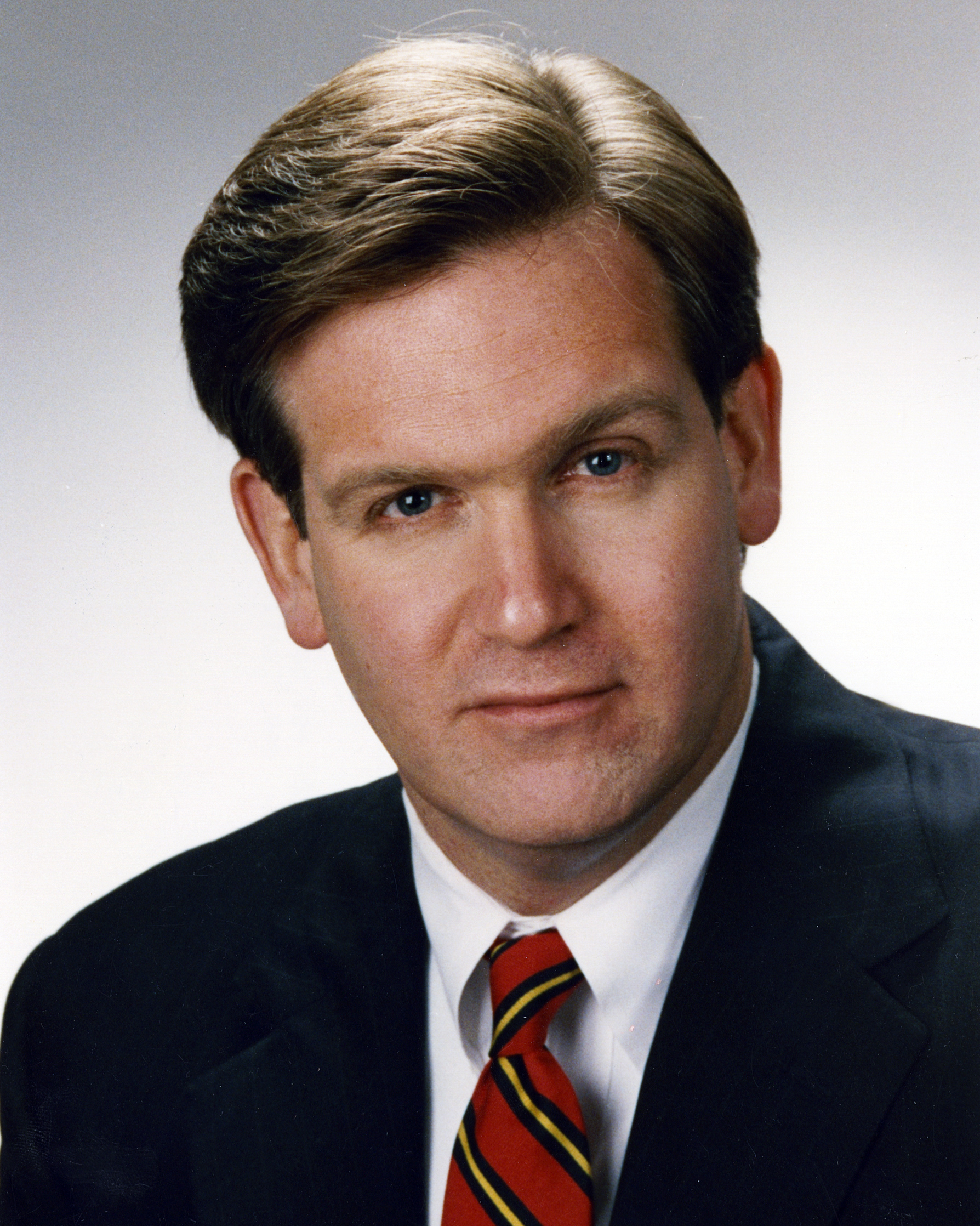
Nominee	Kit Bond	Jay Nixon
Party	Republican	Democratic
Popular vote	830,625	690,208
Percentage	52.7%	43.8%
- County results Bond: 40-50% 50-60% 60-70% 70-80% Nixon: 40–50% 50–60% 60–70%
U.S. senator before election
Kit Bond
Republican
Elected U.S. Senator
Kit Bond
Republican

Incumbent Republican Kit Bond won re-election to a third term.

General election results
Party	Candidate	Votes	%
Republican	Kit Bond (incumbent)	830,625	52.68%
Democratic	Jay Nixon	690,208	43.77%
Libertarian	Tamara Millay	31,876	2.02%
Constitution	Curtis Frazier	15,368	0.98%
Reform	James Newport	8,780	0.56%
Majority		140,417	8.90%
Turnout		1,576,857	
Republican hold			

== Nevada ==
Nevada election
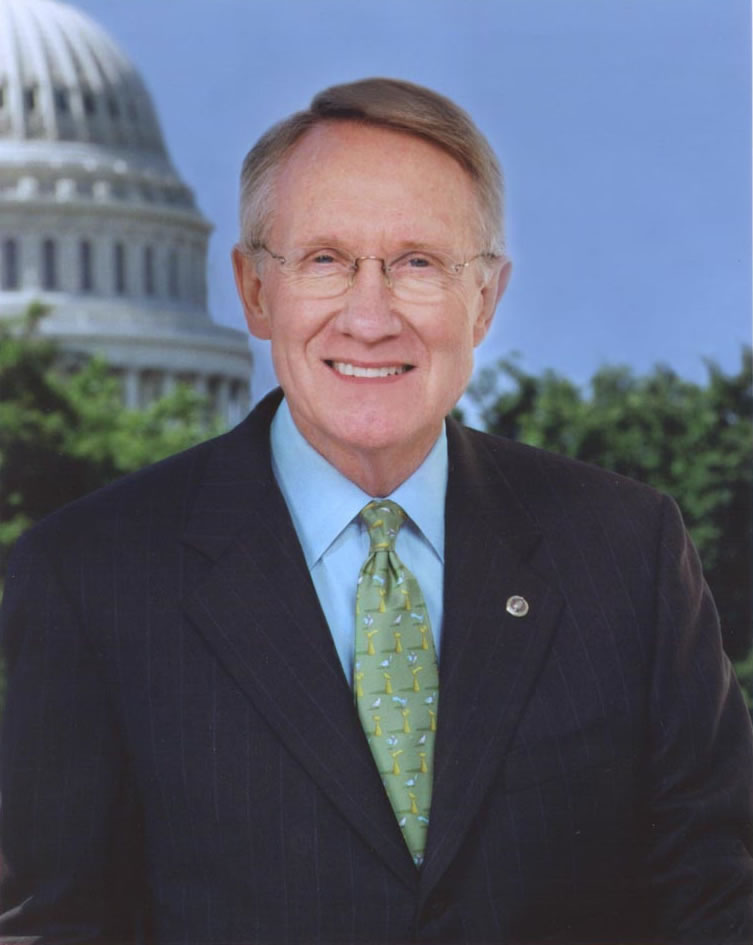

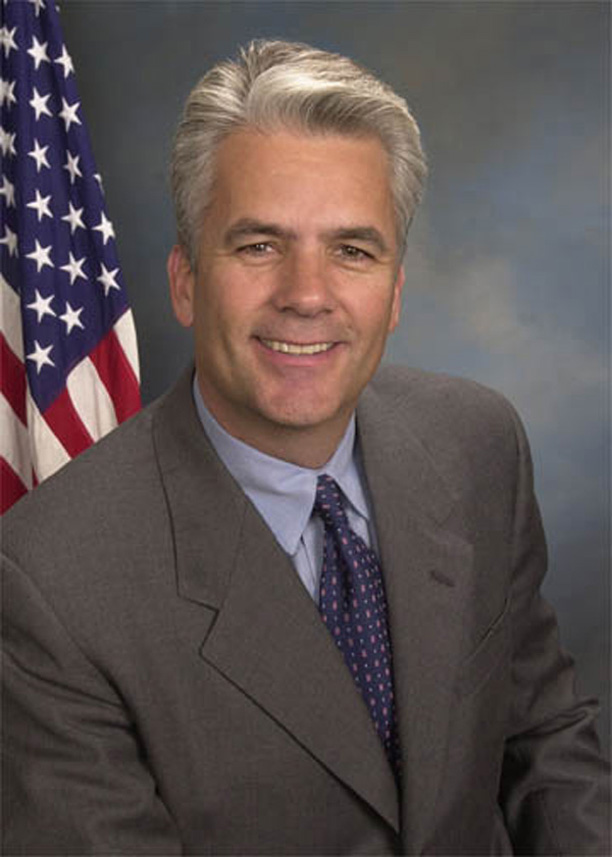
Nominee	Harry Reid	John Ensign
Party	Democratic	Republican
Popular vote	208,621	208,220
Percentage	47.9%	47.8%
- County results Reid: 50–60% Ensign: 40–50% 50–60% 60–70% 70–80%
U.S. senator before election
Harry Reid
Democratic
Elected U.S. Senator
Harry Reid
Democratic

Incumbent Democrat Harry Reid won re-election to a third term.

Republican primary
Party	Candidate	Votes	%
Republican	John Ensign	105,263	80.57%
Republican	Ralph W. Stephens	13,679	10.47%
Republican	None of these candidates	11,704	8.96%
Total votes		130,646	100.00%

Reid won in a close election by 401 votes—even closer than Tim Johnson's Senate run in South Dakota in 2002, when he narrowly defeated Congressman John Thune by 524 votes. Ensign did not contest the results, and Reid won the race.

General election
Party	Candidate	Votes	%	±%
Democratic	Harry Reid (incumbent)	208,621	47.86%	−3.19%
Republican	John Ensign	208,220	47.77%	+7.56%
Libertarian	Michael Cloud	8,129	1.87%	+0.41%
None of These Candidates		8,113	1.86%	-0.79%
Natural Law	Michael E. Williams	2,781	0.64%	−0.83%
Majority		401	0.09%	−10.74%
Turnout		435,864		
Democratic hold				

== New Hampshire ==
New Hampshire election
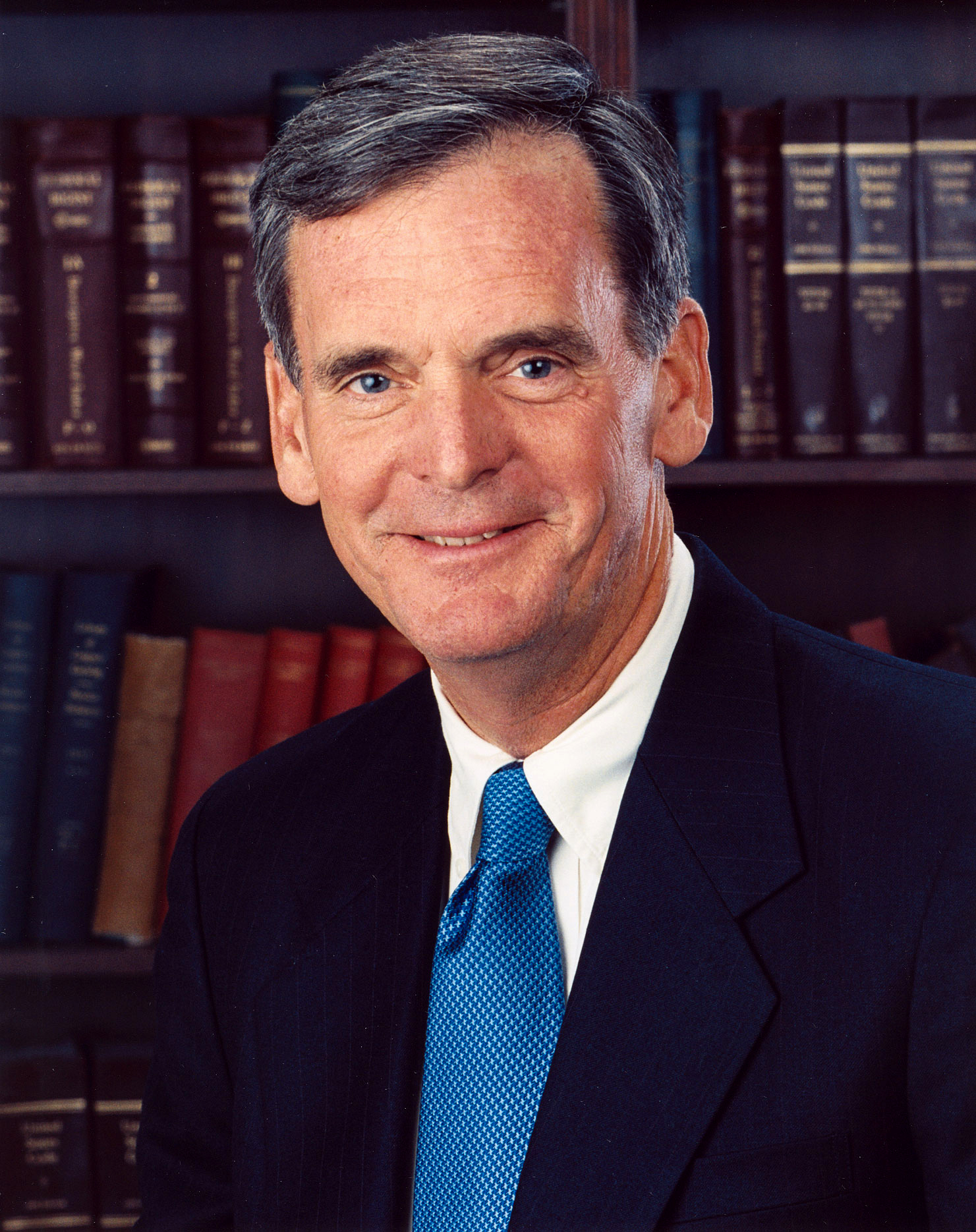

Nominee	Judd Gregg	George Condodemetraky
Party	Republican	Democratic
Popular vote	213,477	88,883
Percentage	67.8%	28.2%
- Gregg: 40–50% 50–60% 60–70% 70–80% 80–90% >90% Condodemetraky: 50–60%
U.S. senator before election
Judd Gregg
Republican
Elected U.S. Senator
Judd Gregg
Republican

Incumbent Republican Judd Gregg won re-election to a second term.

General election
Party	Candidate	Votes	%
Republican	Judd Gregg (incumbent)	213,477	67.8%
Democratic	George Condodemetraky	88,883	28.2%
Libertarian	Brian Christeson	7,603	2.4%
Independent American	Roy Kendel	4,733	1.5%
Majority		124,594	39.6%
Turnout		314,696	100.0%
Republican hold			

== New York ==
New York election
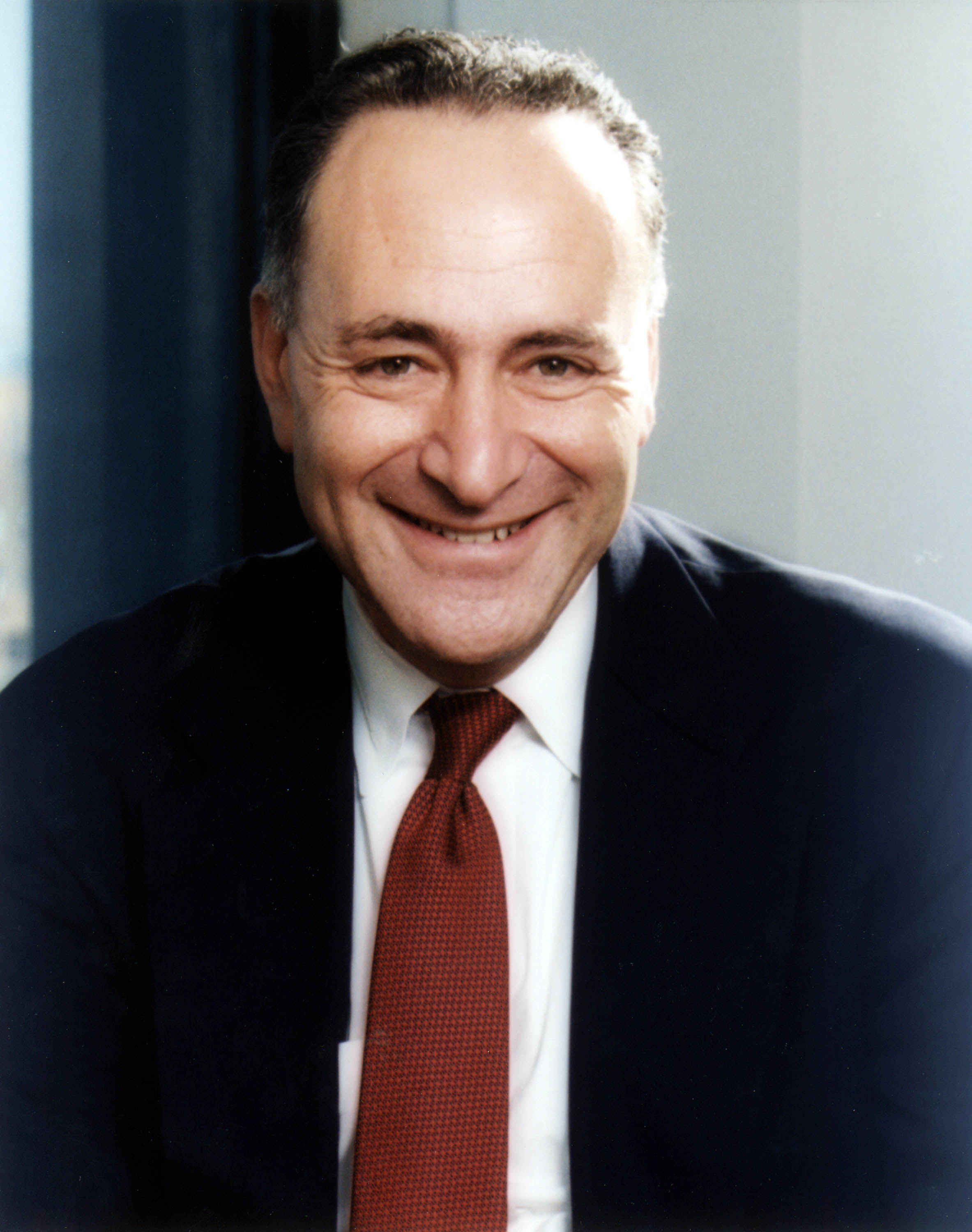

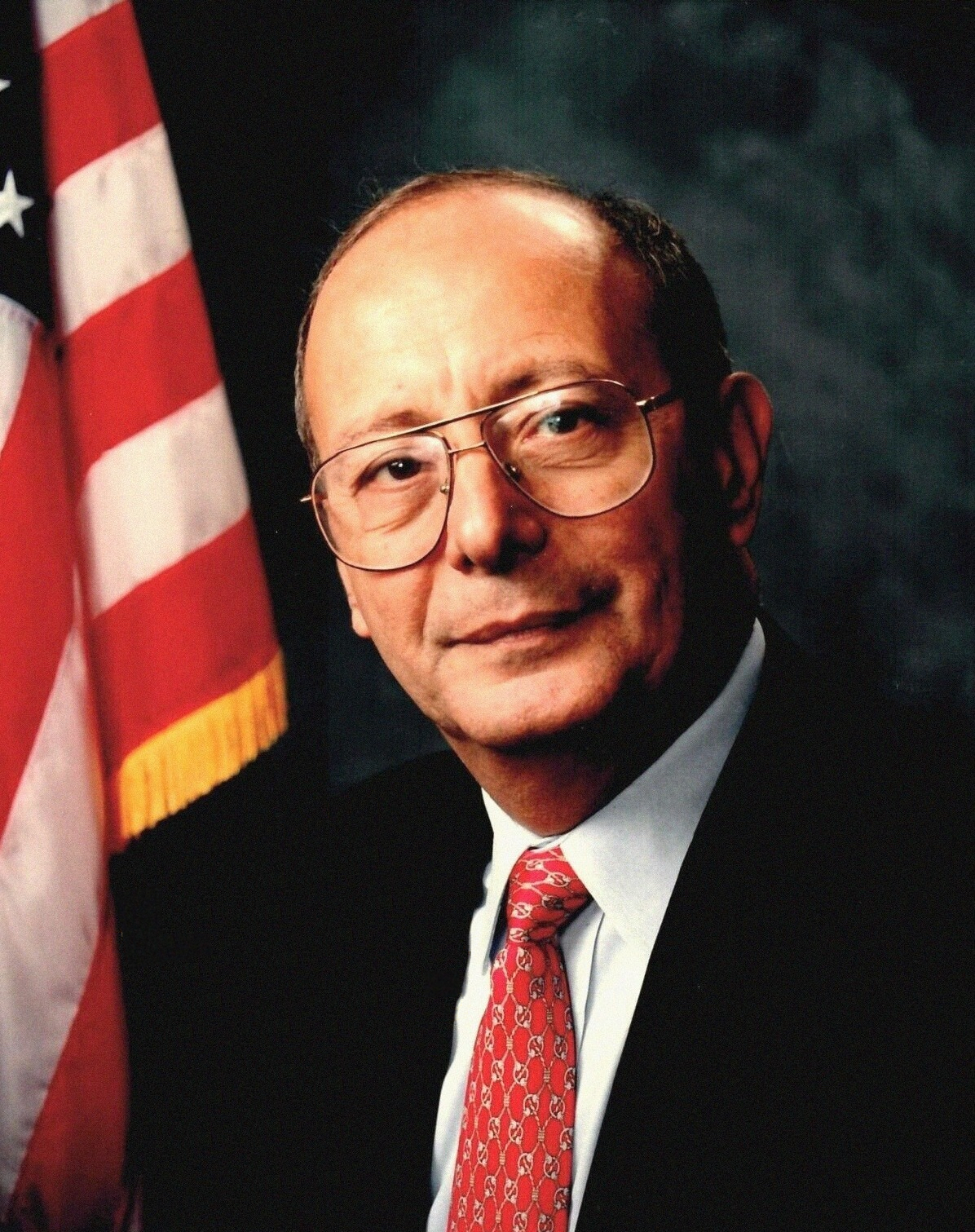
Nominee	Chuck Schumer	Al D'Amato
Party	Democratic	Republican
Popular vote	2,551,065	2,058,988
Percentage	54.6%	44.1%
- County results Schumer: 40–50% 50–60% 60–70% 70–80% 80–90% D'Amato: 50–60% 60–70% 70–80%
U.S. senator before election
Al D'Amato
Republican
Elected U.S. Senator
Chuck Schumer
Democratic

Incumbent Republican Al D'Amato was running for re-election to a fourth term, but lost to Chuck Schumer in what was considered by many to be the "high[est] profile and nastiest" contest of the year.

Geraldine Ferraro, former U.S. representative, was well known for having been the 1984 Democratic vice presidential nominee, and had also run but lost in the Democratic primary in the 1992 U.S. Senate election in New York. Mark Green, New York City public advocate, had been the Democratic nominee in the 1986 election, but lost in the general election to D'Amato.

At the start of 1998, Ferraro had done no fundraising, out of fear of conflict of interest with her job hosting the CNN program Crossfire, but was nonetheless perceived as the front-runner by virtue of her name recognition; December and January polls had her 25 percentage points ahead of Green in the race and even further ahead of Schumer. Unlike her previous campaigns, Ferraro's family finances never became an issue in 1998. However, she lost ground during the summer, with Schumer catching her in the polls by early August and then soon passing her. Schumer, a tireless fundraiser, outspent her by five to one, and Ferraro failed to establish a political image current with the times. In the September 15, 1998, primary, she was beaten soundly by Schumer with a 51 percent to 26 percent margin. Unlike the bitter 1992 Democratic senatorial primary, this contest was not divisive, and Ferraro and third-place finisher Green endorsed Schumer at a unity breakfast the following day.

The primaries were held on September 15, 1998.

Democratic primary for the 1998 United States Senate election in New York
Party	Candidate	Votes	%
Democratic	Chuck Schumer	388,701	50.84%
Democratic	Geraldine Ferraro	201,625	26.37%
Democratic	Mark Green	145,819	19.07%
Democratic	Eric Ruano-Melendez	28,493	3.73%

Independence Party primary for the 1998 United States Senate election in New York
Party	Candidate	Votes	%
Independence	Chuck Schumer	2,562	58.04%
Independence	Mark Green	1,852	41.96%

Right to Life Party primary for the 1998 United States Senate election in New York
Party	Candidate	Votes	%	±%
Right to Life	Al D'Amato	3,798	63.07%	
Right to Life	Thomas Drolesky	2,224	36.93%	

During the general campaign, D'Amato attempted to brand Schumer as a diehard liberal, while Schumer accused D'Amato of being a liar. When D'Amato's first strategy failed, D'Amato attacked his opponent's attendance record as a member of Congress, which Schumer refuted.

Late in the campaign, D'Amato called Schumer a "putzhead" in a private meeting with Jewish supporters ("putz" is Yiddish for penis, and can be slang for "fool"). The senator later apologized.

In the last days of the campaign, D'Amato campaigned with popular Governor George Pataki, who was also running for re-election, and was also supported by New York City Mayor Rudy Giuliani and former mayor Ed Koch (a Democrat) Vice President Al Gore and First Lady Hillary Clinton personally campaigned for Schumer, as D'Amato was a prominent critic of President Bill Clinton who led the investigation into Whitewater. Though the Republican party was well organized, the Democratic party benefited from robocalls from President Clinton and mobilization from two big unions, United Federation of Teachers and 1199.

Though D'Amato was effective in obtaining federal government funds for New York State projects during his Senate career, he failed to capitalize on this in the election. Also, Schumer was a tenacious fund-raiser and was aggressive in his attacks. The candidates spent $30 million during the race.

The race was not close, with Schumer defeating the incumbent D'Amato by just over 10%. D'Amato did win a majority of New York's counties, but in less populated areas. Schumer's win is attributed to strong performance in New York City. He also performed well in heavily populated upstate cities, like Buffalo, Syracuse, Rochester, and Albany.

1998 United States Senate election in New York
Party	Candidate	Votes	%
Democratic	Chuck Schumer	2,386,314	
Independence	Chuck Schumer	109,027	
Liberal	Chuck Schumer	55,724	
Total	Chuck Schumer	2,551,065	54.62%
Republican	Al D'Amato	1,680,203	
Conservative	Al D'Amato	274,220	
Right to Life Party (New York)	Al D'Amato	104,565	
Total	Al D'Amato (incumbent)	2,058,988	44.08%
Marijuana Reform Party	Corinne Kurtz	34,281	0.73%
Green	Joel Kovel	14,735	0.32%
Libertarian	William McMillen	8,223	0.18%
Socialist Workers	Rose Ana Berbeo	3,513	0.08%
Majority			
Turnout			
Democratic gain from Republican			

Per New York State law, Schumer and D'Amato totals include minor party line votes: Independence Party and Liberal Party for Schumer, Right to Life Party for D'Amato.

== North Carolina ==
North Carolina election
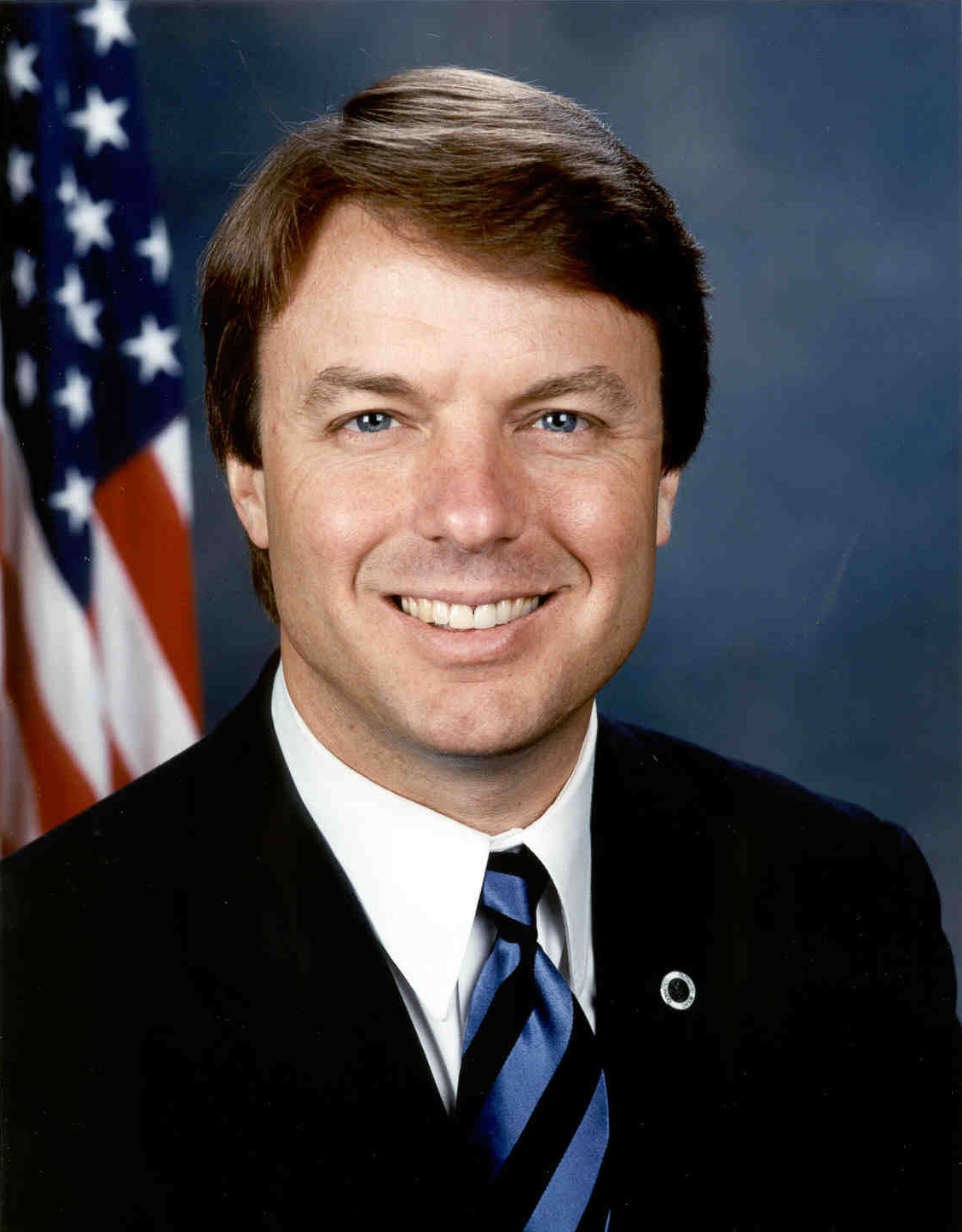

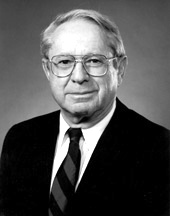
Nominee	John Edwards	Lauch Faircloth
Party	Democratic	Republican
Popular vote	1,029,237	945,943
Percentage	51.15%	47.01%
- County results Edwards: 40–50% 50–60% 60–70% 70–80% Faircloth: 40–50% 50–60% 60–70%
U.S. senator before election
Lauch Faircloth
Republican
Elected U.S. Senator
John Edwards
Democratic

Incumbent Republican Lauch Faircloth sought re-election to a second term, but was unseated by Democrat John Edwards.

In the Democratic primary, Edwards defeated D. G. Martin, Ella Scarborough, and several minor candidates. In the Republican primary, Faircloth easily defeated two minor candidates.

1998 North Carolina United States Senate election
Party	Candidate	Votes	%	±%
Democratic	John Edwards	1,029,237	51.15%	
Republican	Lauch Faircloth (incumbent)	945,943	47.01%	
Libertarian	Barbara Howe	36,963	1.84%	
Majority		83,294	4.14%	
Turnout		2,012,143		
Democratic gain from Republican				

== North Dakota ==
North Dakota election
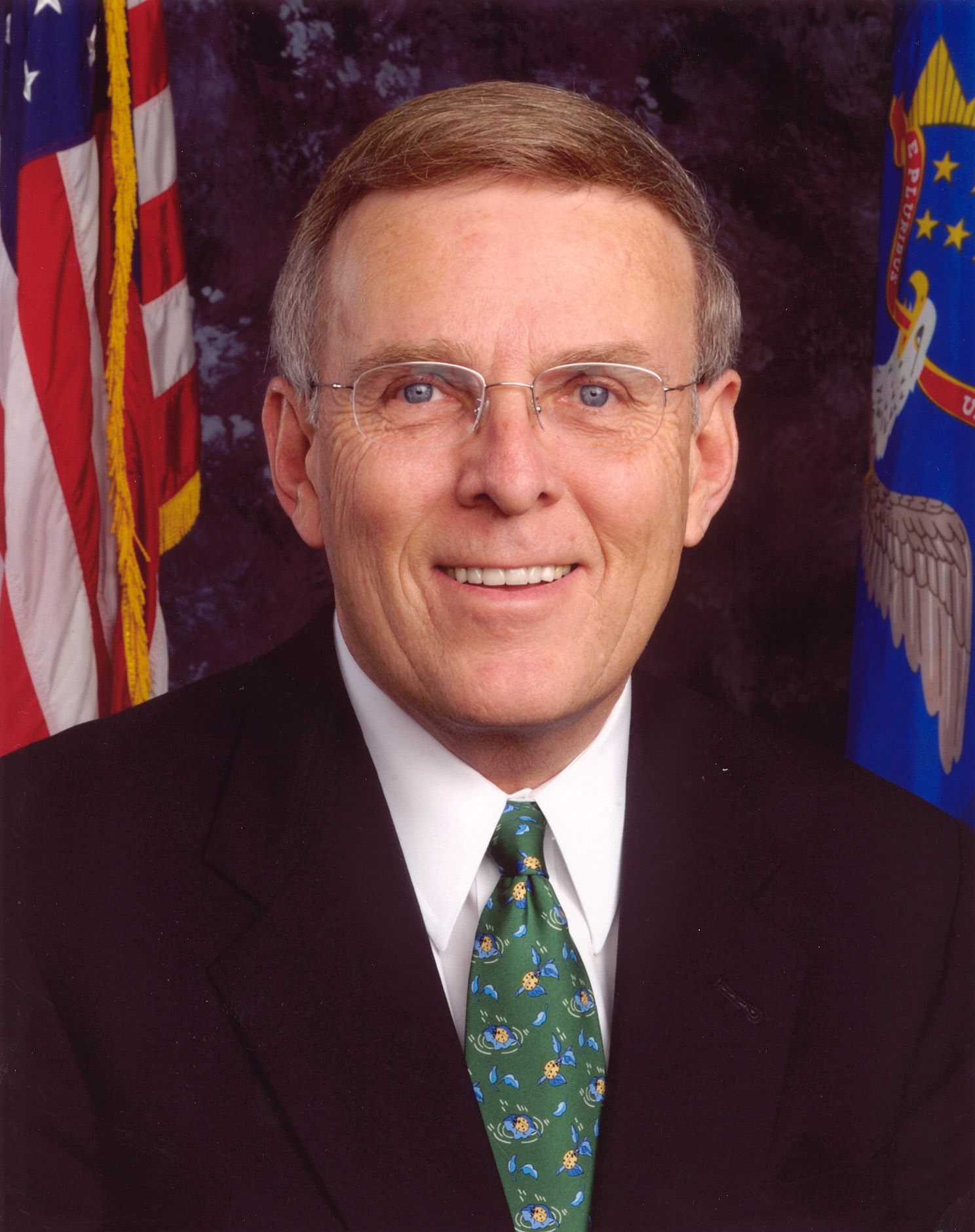

Nominee	Byron Dorgan	Donna Nalewaja
Party	Democratic–NPL	Republican
Popular vote	134,747	75,013
Percentage	63.2%	35.2%
- County results Dorgan: 50–60% 60–70% 70–80% 80–90% Tie: 40–50%
U.S. senator before election
Byron Dorgan
Democratic–NPL
Elected U.S. Senator
Byron Dorgan
Democratic–NPL

Incumbent NPL–Democrat Byron Dorgan won re-election to a second term.

Republican State Senator Donna Nalewaja's campaign focused on the suggestion that Dorgan had served in the United States Congress for nearly 20 years, and had accomplished relatively little. Dorgan and Nalewaja won the primary elections for their respective parties. McLain had previously run for North Dakota's other Senate seat in 1980 against Mark Andrews.

1998 United States Senate election, North Dakota
Party	Candidate	Votes	%	±%
Democratic–NPL	Byron Dorgan (incumbent)	134,747	63.16%	
Republican	Donna Nalewaja	75,013	35.16%	
Reform	Harley McLain	3,598	1.69%	
Majority				
Turnout		213,358		
Democratic hold				

== Ohio ==
Ohio election
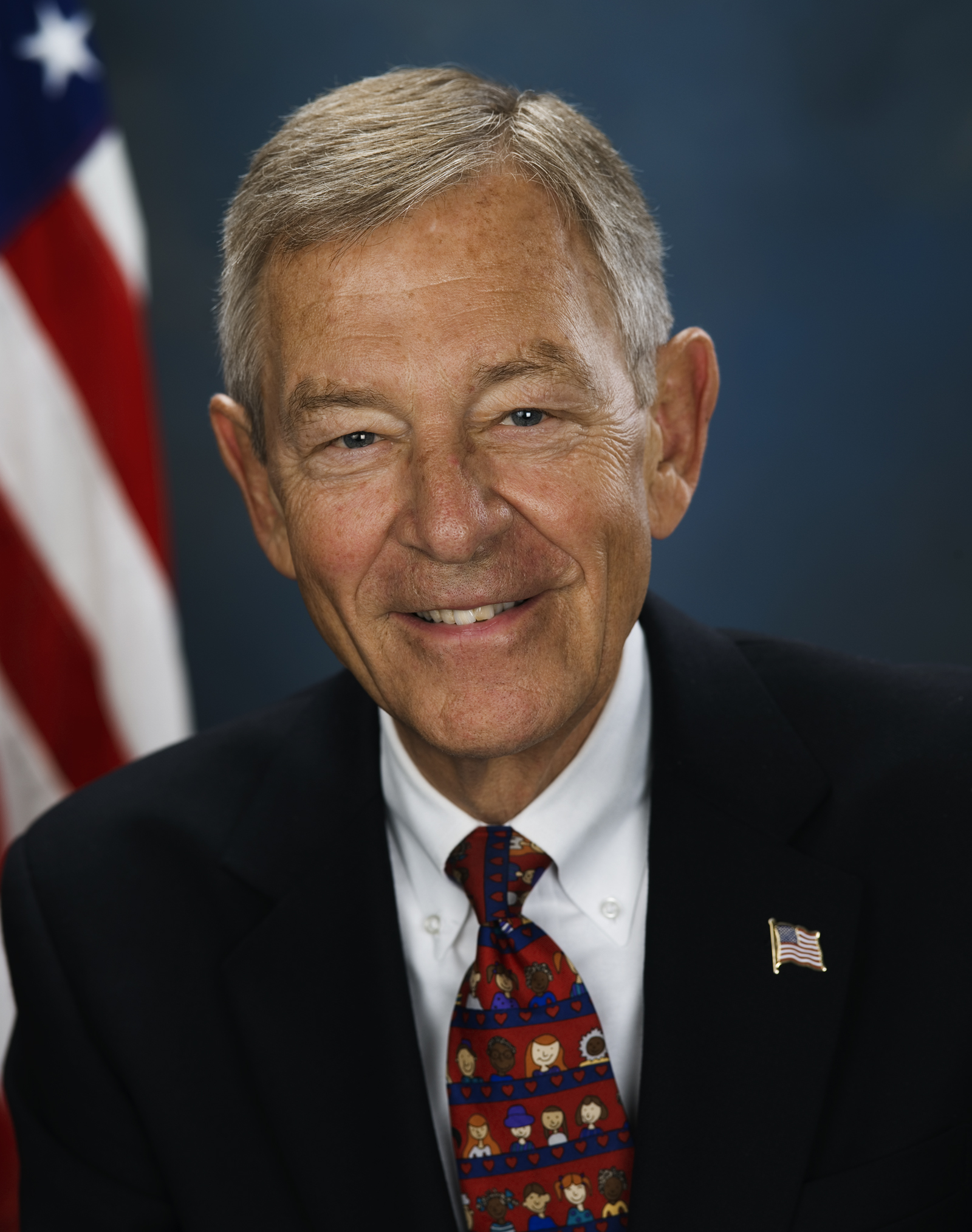

Nominee	George Voinovich	Mary Boyle
Party	Republican	Democratic
Popular vote	1,922,087	1,482,054
Percentage	56.5%	43.5%
- County results Voinovich: 50–60% 60–70% 70–80% Boyle: 50–60% 60–70%
U.S. senator before election
John Glenn
Democratic
Elected U.S. Senator
George Voinovich
Republican

Incumbent Democratic U.S Senator John Glenn decided to retire, instead of seeking a fifth term. Republican Governor George Voinovich won the open seat.

General election
Party	Candidate	Votes	%	±%
Republican	George V. Voinovich	1,922,087	56.5%	
Democratic	Mary Boyle	1,482,054	43.5%	
Majority		440,033	13.0%	
Turnout		3,404,141	100.0%	
Republican hold				

== Oklahoma ==
Oklahoma election
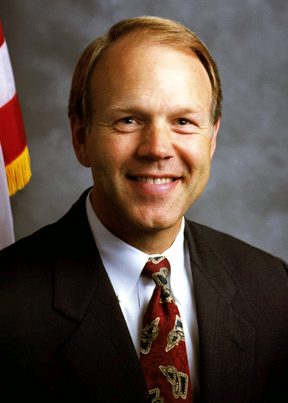

Nominee	Don Nickles	Don Carroll
Party	Republican	Democratic
Popular vote	570,682	268,898
Percentage	66.4%	31.3%
- County results Nickles: 40-50% 50-60% 60-70% 70-80% 80-90% Carroll: 50–60%
U.S. senator before election
Don Nickles
Republican
Elected U.S. Senator
Don Nickles
Republican

Incumbent Republican Don Nickles won re-election to a fourth term.

OK U.S. Senate election, 1998
Party	Candidate	Votes	%	±%
Republican	Don Nickles (incumbent)	570,682	66.4%	
Democratic	Don Carroll	268,898	31.3%	
Independent	Mike Morris	15,516	1.8%	
Independent	Argus W. Jr. Yandell	4,617	0.4%	
Majority		301,784	35.1%	
Turnout		859,713	100.0%	
Republican hold				

== Oregon ==
Oregon election
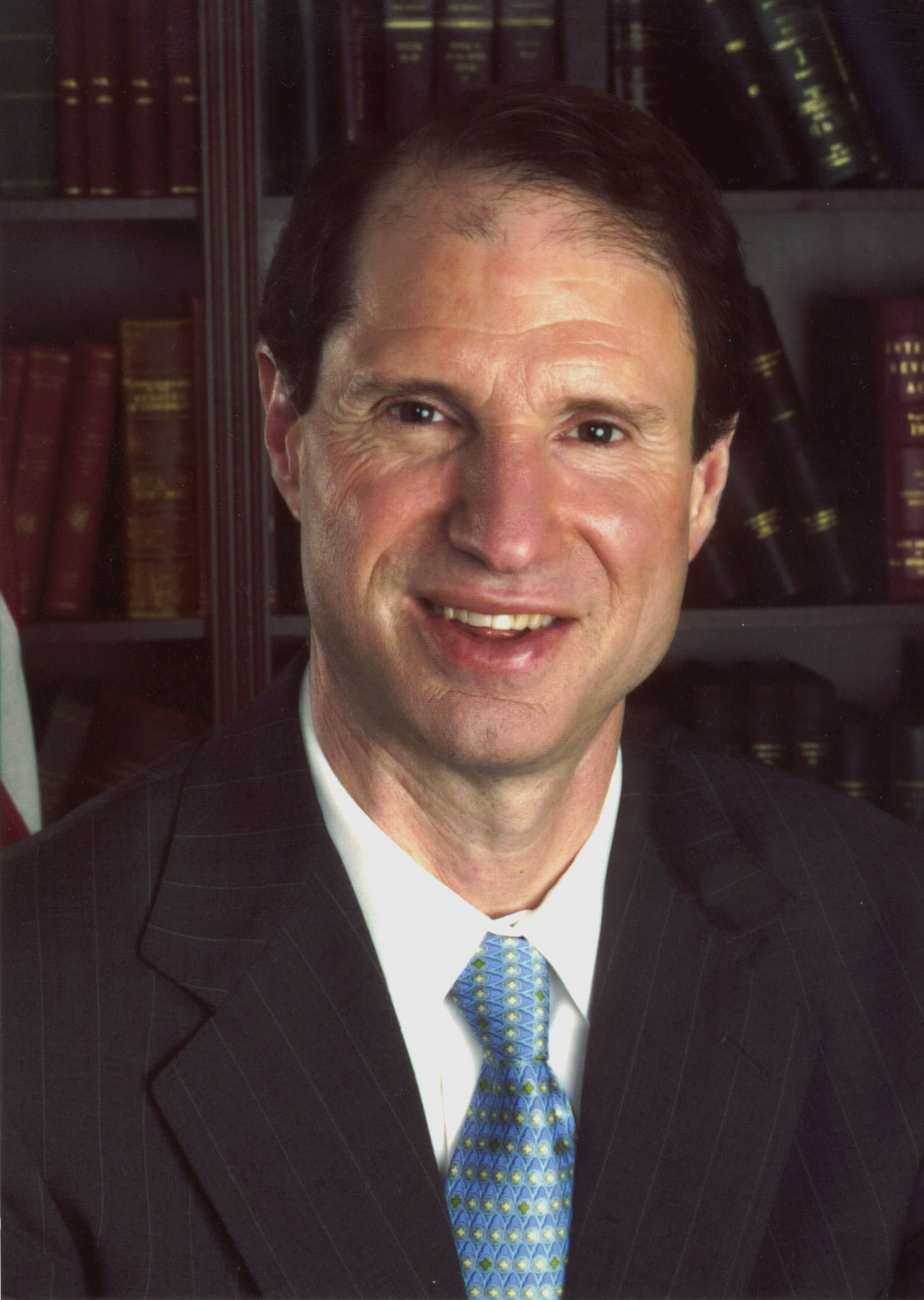

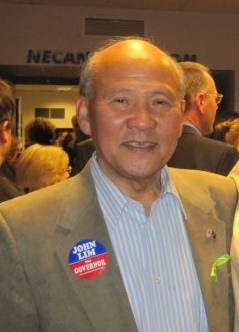
Nominee	Ron Wyden	John Lim
Party	Democratic	Republican
Popular vote	682,425	377,739
Percentage	61.1%	33.8%
- County results Wyden: 40–50% 50–60% 60–70% 70–80% Lim: 50–60%
U.S. senator before election
Ron Wyden
Democratic
Elected U.S. Senator
Ron Wyden
Democratic

Incumbent Democratic Ron Wyden won re-election to his first full term, defeating Republican nominee John Lim, a state senator.

General election
Party	Candidate	Votes	%	±%
Democratic	Ron Wyden (incumbent)	682,425	61.05%	+13.27%
Republican	John Lim	377,739	33.79%	−12.47%
Pacific Green	Karyn Moskowitz	22,024	1.97%	+1.37%
Libertarian	Jim Brewster	18,221	1.63%	+0.32%
Natural Law	Michael A. Campbell	8,372	0.75%	+0.75%
Socialist	Dean M. Braa	7,553	0.68%	+.02%
Write-in	Misc.	1,413	0.13%	−1.12%
Majority		304,686	27.26%	+25.74
Turnout		1,117,747		
Democratic hold				

== Pennsylvania ==
Pennsylvania election
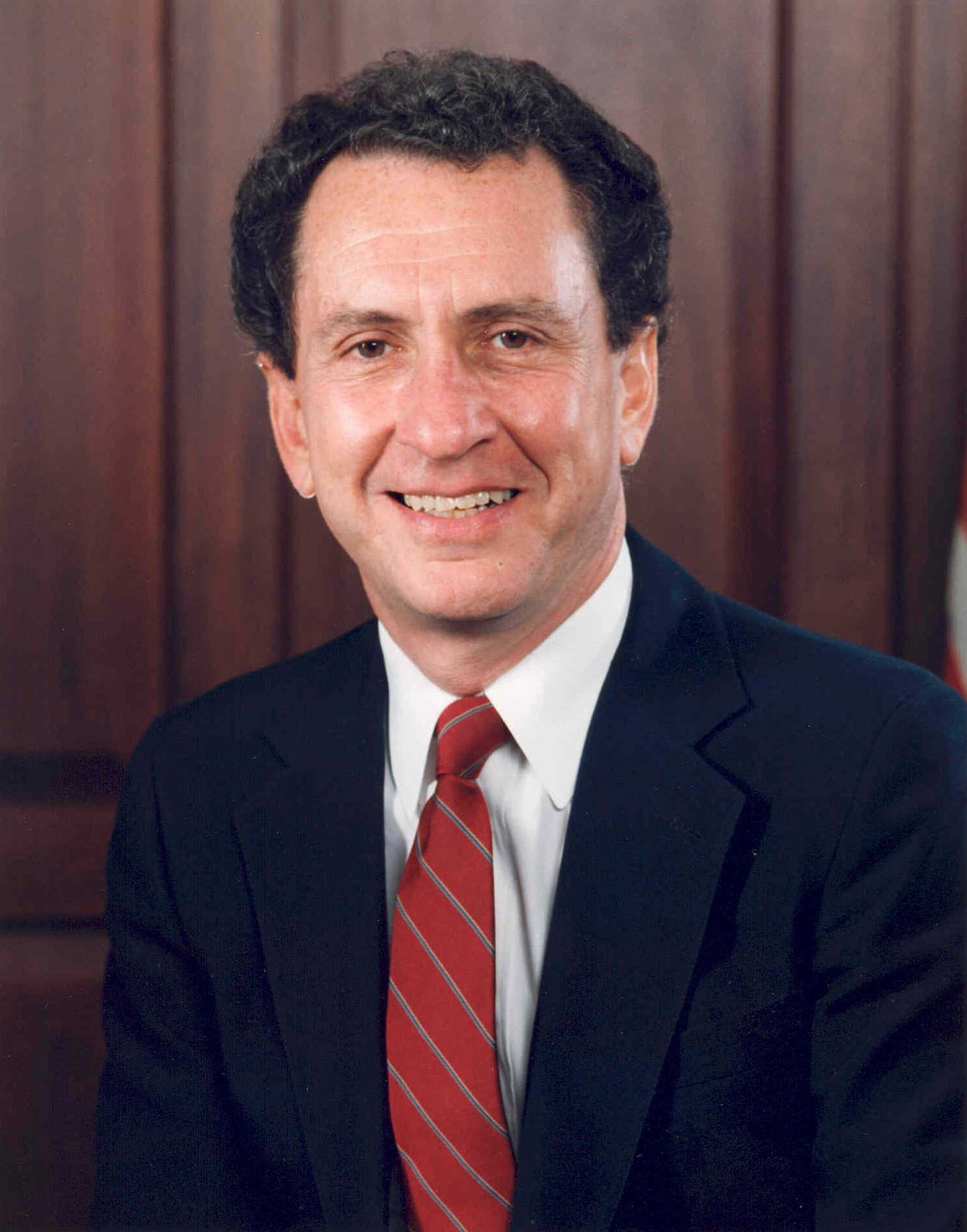

Nominee	Arlen Specter	Bill Lloyd
Party	Republican	Democratic
Popular vote	1,814,180	1,028,839
Percentage	61.3%	34.8%
- Specter: 40–50% 50–60% 60–70% 70–80% 80–90% >90% Lloyd: 40–50% 50–60% 60–70% 70–80% 80–90% >90% Tie: 30–40% 40–50% No data
U.S. senator before election
Arlen Specter
Republican
Elected U.S. Senator
Arlen Specter
Republican

Incumbent Republican Arlen Specter won re-election to a fourth term.

Leading up to this campaign, the state Democratic Party was in dire straits, as it was plagued by prior corruption allegations of several key legislators and by a lack of fund-raising. Just as in the accompanying gubernatorial race, the party had difficulty in finding a credible candidate. State Representative Bill Lloyd who was a well-respected party leader but who had almost zero statewide name recognition, was considered to be a sacrificial lamb candidate. Specter ran a straightforward campaign and attempted to avoid mistakes, while Lloyd's bid was so underfunded that he was unable to air a single commercial until two weeks before the election. Lloyd's strategy was to portray Republicans as hyper-partisan in the wake of their attempt to impeach President Bill Clinton, but he was unable to gain any traction with his message. On Election Day, Specter's win was by the second-largest margin in the history of Senate elections in Pennsylvania. Lloyd won in two counties: almost uniformly Democratic Philadelphia and his home county, rural and typically Republican Somerset County.

General election
Party	Candidate	Votes	%	±%
Republican	Arlen Specter (incumbent)	1,814,180	61.3%	
Democratic	Bill Lloyd	1,028,839	34.8%	
Constitution	Dean Snyder	68,377	2.3%	
Libertarian	Jack Iannantuono	46,103	1.6%	
Majority		785,341	26.5%	
Turnout		2,957,499	100.0%	
Republican hold				

== South Carolina ==
South Carolina election
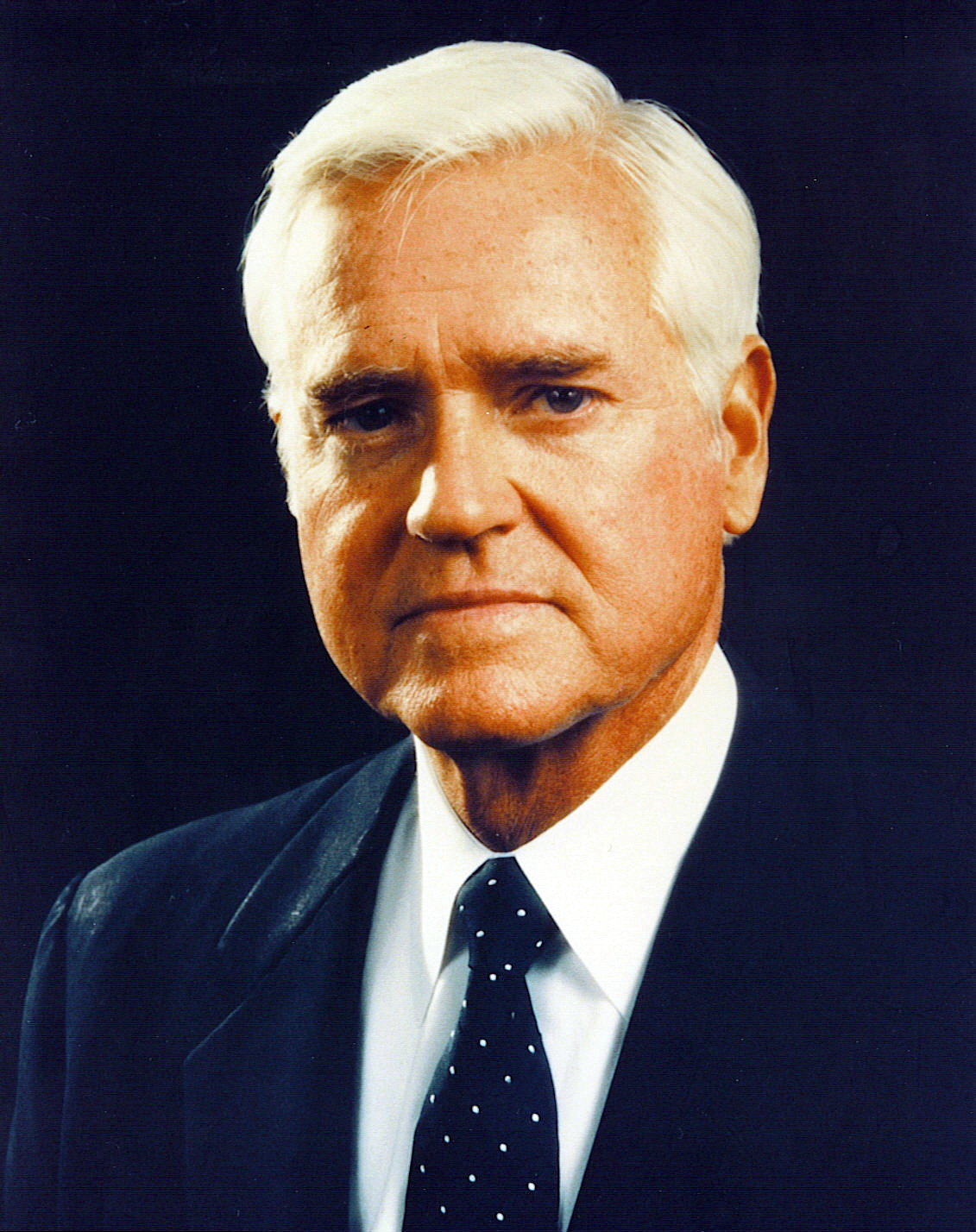

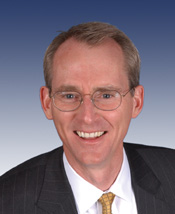
Nominee	Ernest Hollings	Bob Inglis
Party	Democratic	Republican
Popular vote	563,377	488,238
Percentage	52.70%	45.67%
- County results Hollings: 40–50% 50–60% 60–70% 70–80% Inglis: 40–50% 50–60% 60–70%
U.S. senator before election
Ernest Hollings
Democratic
Elected U.S. Senator
Ernest Hollings
Democratic

Incumbent Democrat Fritz Hollings won re-election to his sixth full term. As of 2023, this is the last time Democrats won a U.S. Senate election in South Carolina.

South Carolina U.S. Senate election primary, 1998
Party	Candidate	Votes	%	±%
Republican	Bob Inglis	115,029	74.6%	
Republican	Stephen Brown	33,530	21.7%	
Republican	Elton Legrand	5,634	3.7%	

The race between Hollings and Bob Inglis, U.S. representative, gave the voters a choice of two very different visions of and for South Carolina. Hollings was from the Lowcountry, a face of the Old New South, and secured a large amount of federal funds for the state. Inglis came from the Upstate, was a face of the New South, and opposed pork barrel spending. Hollings viciously attacked Inglis on the campaign trail as a "goddamn skunk". When Inglis requested that Hollings sign a pledge for campaign courtesy, Hollings replied that Inglis could "kiss his fanny." Inglis tried to tie Hollings to President Clinton, who had been tainted by the Lewinsky scandal.

Hollings won the race for several crucial reasons. Inglis refused to accept PAC donations, which gave Hollings a huge financial advantage and blanket the state with television advertisements. Inglis came from the Upstate, which already provided GOP majorities, whereas Hollings came from the Lowcountry, a key tossup region in the state. Two years prior, voters in the 1996 Senate election had rewarded Strom Thurmond for his long service to the state, and it was unlikely that they would then deny re-election to Hollings. Finally, the 1998 South Carolina GOP ticket was dragged down with unpopular Governor David Beasley at the top of the ticket, who would lose his re-election campaign to Jim Hodges.

South Carolina U.S. Senate election, 1998
Party	Candidate	Votes	%	±%
Democratic	Fritz Hollings (incumbent)	563,377	52.7%	+2.6%
Republican	Bob Inglis	488,238	45.7%	−1.2%
Libertarian	Richard T. Quillian	16,991	1.6%	−0.3%
No party	Write-ins	457	0.0%	−0.1%
Majority		75,139	7.0%	+3.8%
Turnout		1,069,063	52.8%	
Democratic hold				

== South Dakota ==
South Dakota election
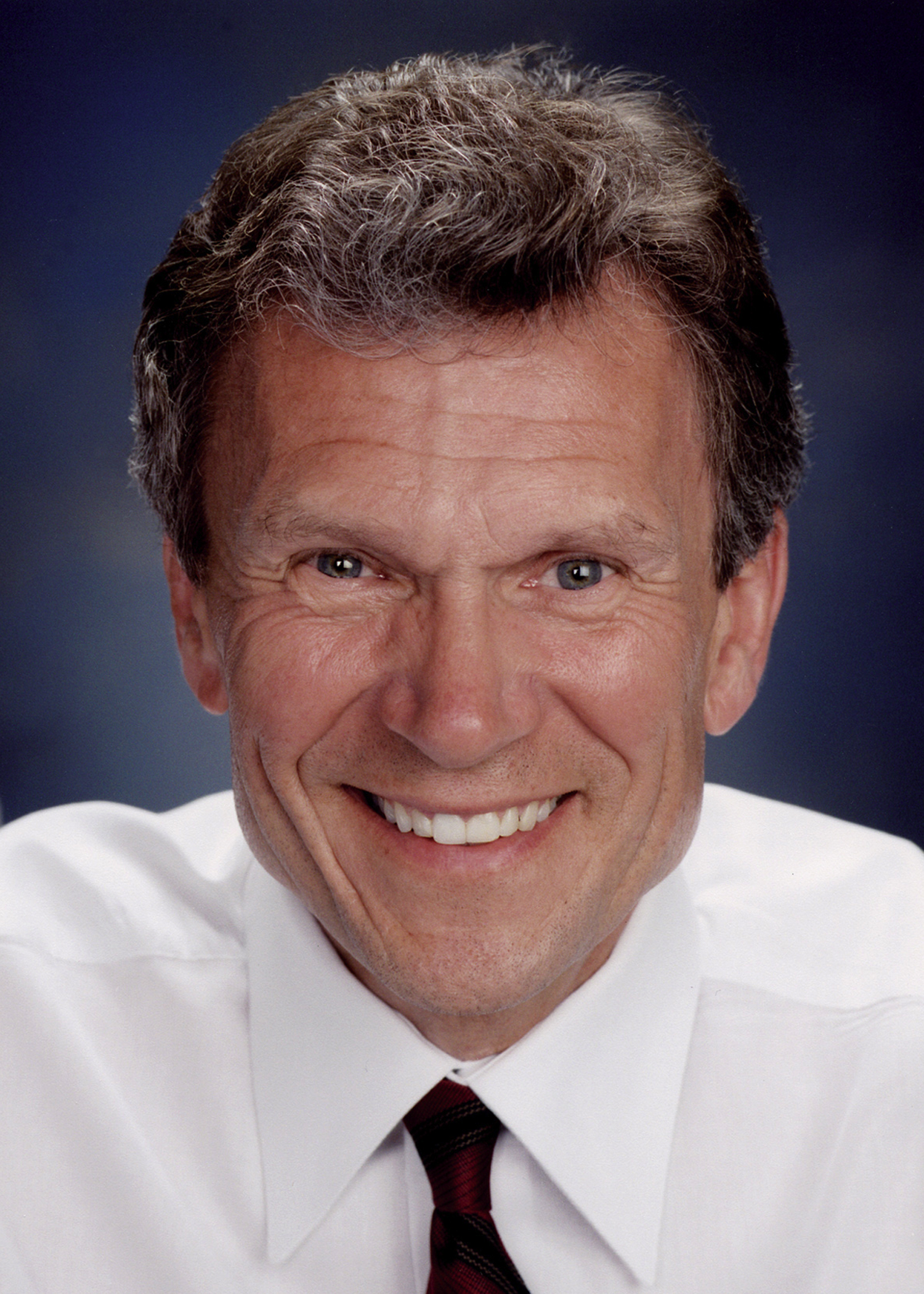

Nominee	Tom Daschle	Ron Schmidt
Party	Democratic	Republican
Popular vote	162,884	95,431
Percentage	62.1%	36.4%
- County results Daschle: 50–60% 60–70% 70–80% Schmidt: 40–50% 50–60%
U.S. senator before election
Tom Daschle
Democratic
Elected U.S. Senator
Tom Daschle
Democratic

Incumbent Democrat Tom Daschle won re-election to a third term. As of 2023, this was the last time the Democrats have won the Class 3 Senate Seat from South Dakota.

Republican primary
Party	Candidate	Votes	%
Republican	Ron Schmidt	26,540	52.01%
Republican	Alan Aker	19,200	37.62%
Republican	John M. Sanders	5,292	10.37%
Total votes		51,032	100.00%

General election
Party	Candidate	Votes	%	±%
Democratic	Tom Daschle (incumbent)	162,884	62.14%	−2.76%
Republican	Ron Schmidt	95,431	36.41%	+3.90%
Libertarian	Byron Dale	3,796	1.45%	+0.15%
Majority		67,453	25.73%	−6.66%
Turnout		262,111		
Democratic hold				

== Utah ==
Utah election
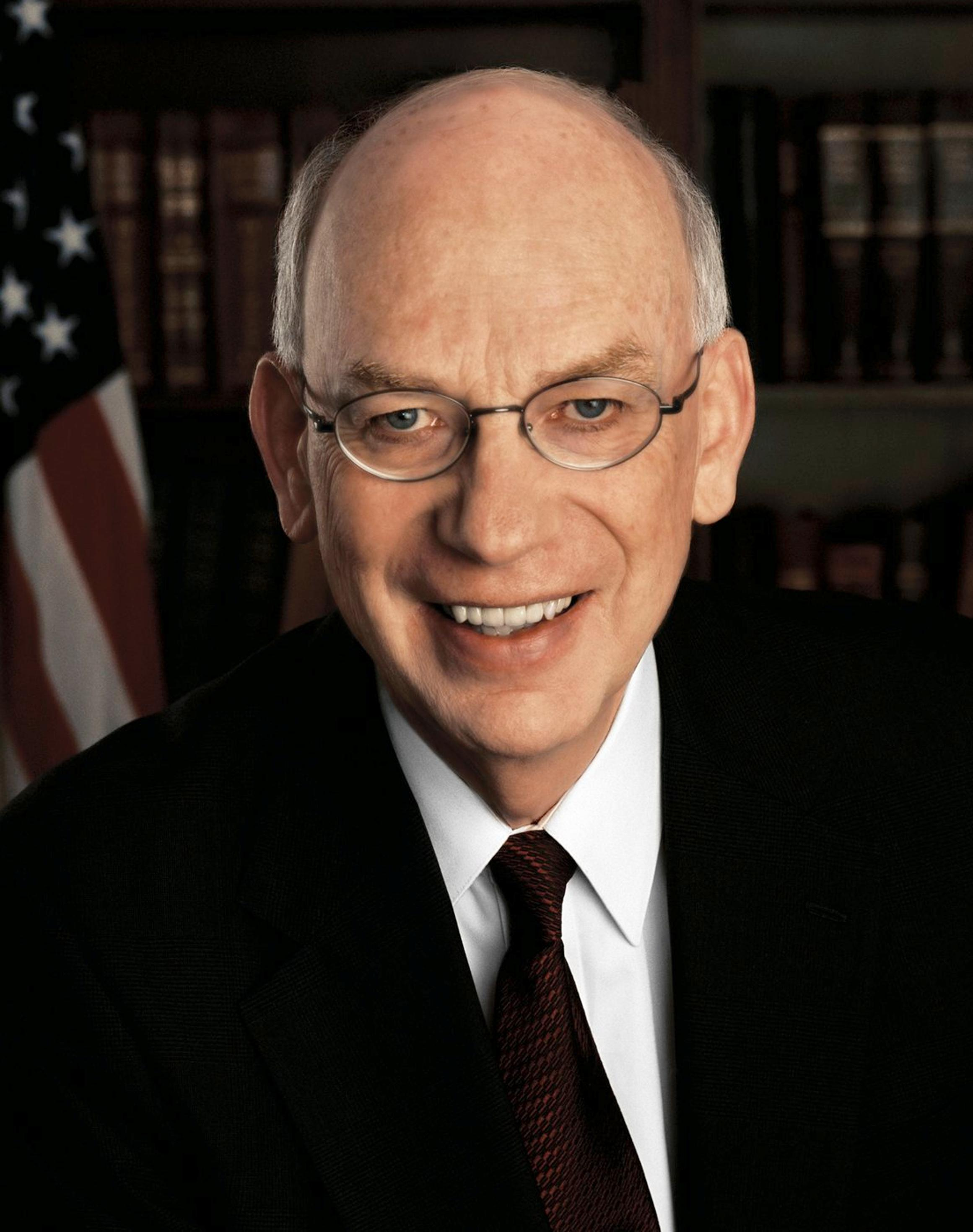

Nominee	Bob Bennett	Scott Leckman
Party	Republican	Democratic
Popular vote	316,652	177,459
Percentage	64.0%	33.0%
- County results Bennett: 50–60% 60–70% 70–80% 80–90% Leckman: 50–60%
U.S. senator before election
Bob Bennett
Republican
Elected U.S. Senator
Bob Bennett
Republican

Incumbent Republican Bob Bennett won re-election to a second term.

General election
Party	Candidate	Votes	%	±%
Republican	Bob Bennett (incumbent)	316,652	63.98%	+8.60%
Democratic	Scott Leckman	163,172	32.97%	−6.74%
Independent American	Gary Van Horn	15,073	3.05%	
Write-ins		12	0.00%	
Majority		153,480	31.01%	+15.34%
Turnout		494,909		
Republican hold				

== Vermont ==
Vermont election
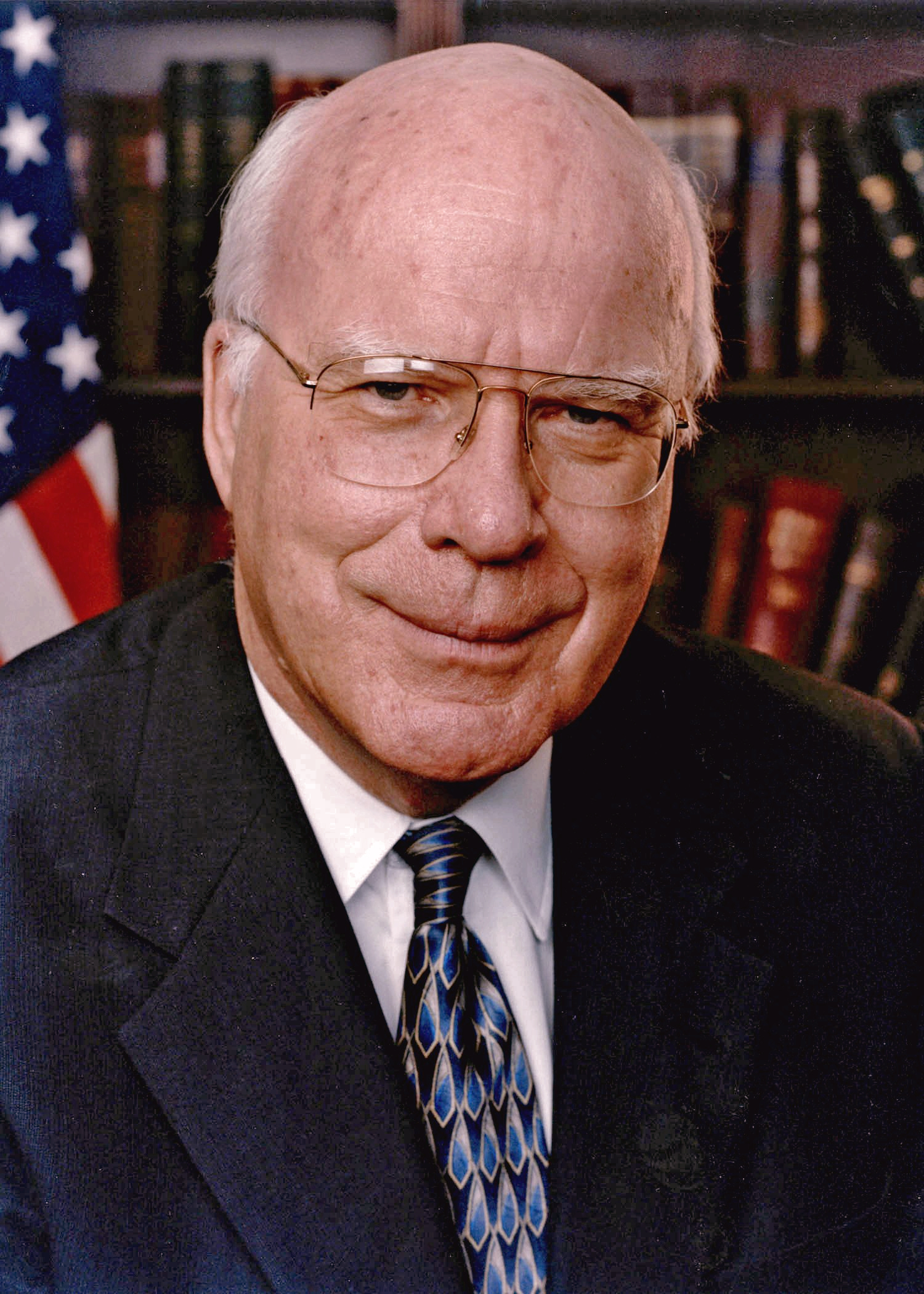
Nominee	Patrick Leahy	Fred Tuttle
Party	Democratic	Republican
Popular vote	154,567	48,051
Percentage	72.2%	22.5%
- Leahy: 40-50% 50-60% 60-70% 70-80% 80-90% Tuttle: 40-50% 50-60%
U.S. senator before election
Patrick Leahy
Democratic
Elected U.S. Senator
Patrick Leahy
Democratic

Incumbent Democrat Patrick Leahy won re-election to a fifth term.

Notably, the Republican nominee, dairy farmer and actor Fred Tuttle, withdrew from the race and endorsed Leahy, asking Vermonters to vote for his Democratic opponent because he hated Washington, D.C., and he was, as his wife had previously said publicly, unqualified to serve as a United States senator. His campaign, which had been conducted primarily from his front porch in Tunbridge, Vermont, spent only $251 during the election season, and featured the slogans "Spread Fred!" and "Why Not?" In spite of this, Tuttle still received 48,051 votes, or 22% of the total.

Democratic primary
Party	Candidate	Votes	%
Democratic	Patrick Leahy (incumbent)	18,643	96.65%
Democratic	Write-ins	647	3.35%
Total votes		19,290	100.00%

Grassroots Party primary
Party	Candidate	Votes	%
Grassroots	Bob Melamede	137	59.57%
Grassroots	Write-ins	93	40.43%
Total votes		230	100.00%

Republican primary
Party	Candidate	Votes	%
Republican	Fred Tuttle	28,355	53.69%
Republican	Jack McMullen	23,321	44.16%
Republican	Write-ins	1,137	2.15%
Total votes		52,813	100.00%

General election
Party	Candidate	Votes	%	±%
Democratic	Patrick Leahy (incumbent)	154,567	72.22%	+18.05%
Republican	Fred Tuttle	48,051	22.45%	−20.90%
Libertarian	Hugh Douglas	4,199	1.96%	
Independent	Barry Nelson	2,893	1.35%	
Grassroots	Robert Melamede	2,459	1.15%	
Liberty Union	Jerry Levy	1,238	0.58%	−1.21%
Write-ins		629	0.29%	
Majority		106,516	49.77%	+38.95%
Turnout		214,036		
Democratic hold				

== Washington ==
Washington election
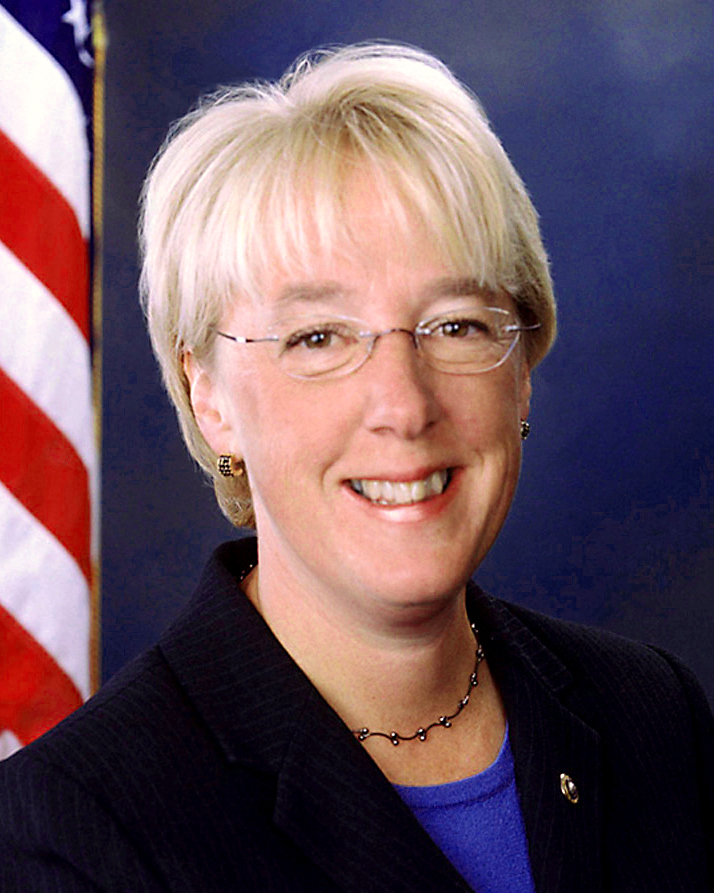

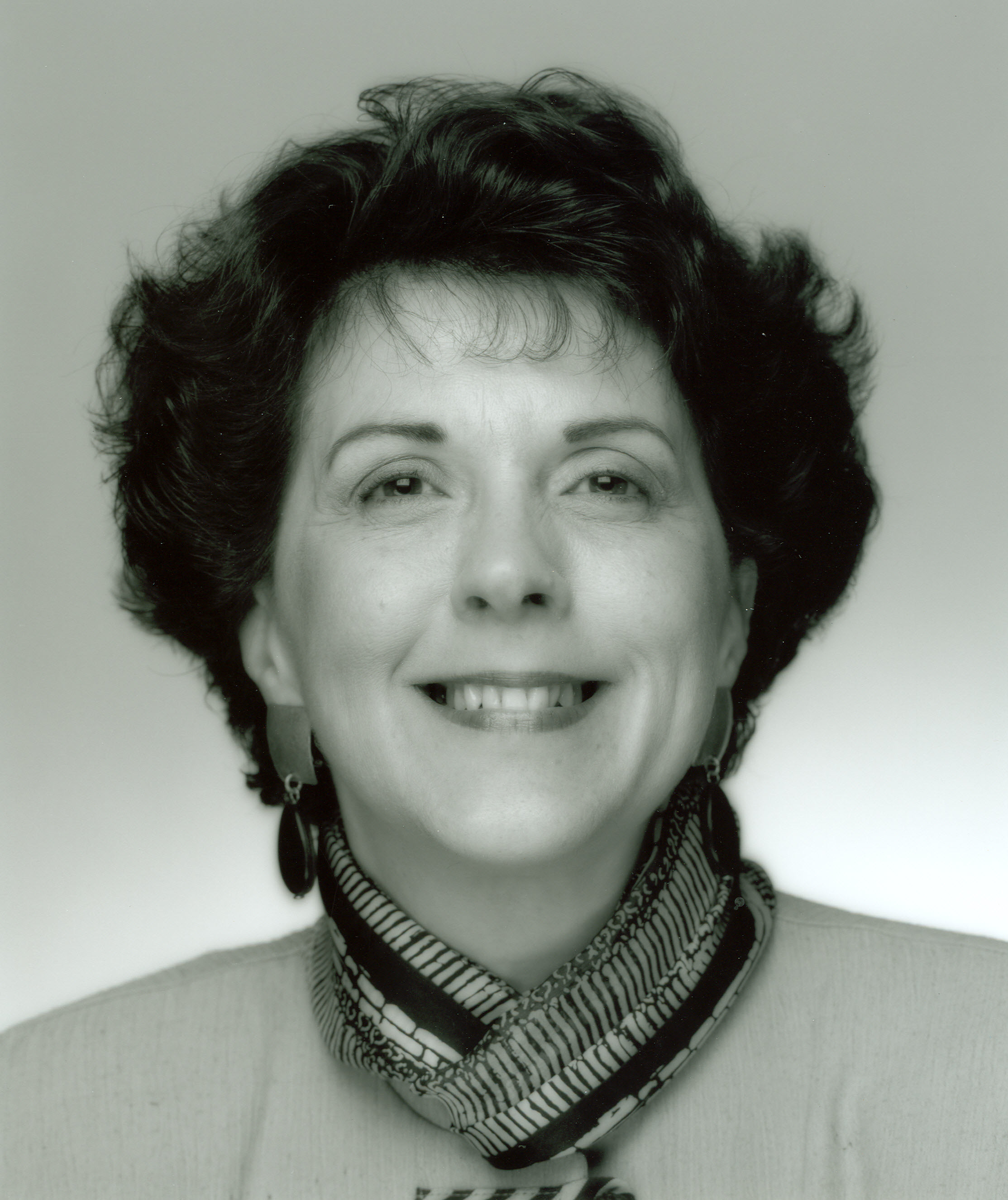
Nominee	Patty Murray	Linda Smith
Party	Democratic	Republican
Popular vote	1,103,184	785,377
Percentage	58.4%	41.6%
- County results Murray: 50–60% 60–70% Smith: 50–60%
U.S. senator before election
Patty Murray
Democratic
Elected U.S. Senator
Patty Murray
Democratic

Incumbent Democrat Patty Murray won re-election to a second term.

General election
Party	Candidate	Votes	%
Democratic	Patty Murray (incumbent)	1,103,184	58.4%
Republican	Linda Smith	785,377	41.6%
Total votes		1,888,561	100.00%
Turnout			
Democratic hold			

== Wisconsin ==
Wisconsin election
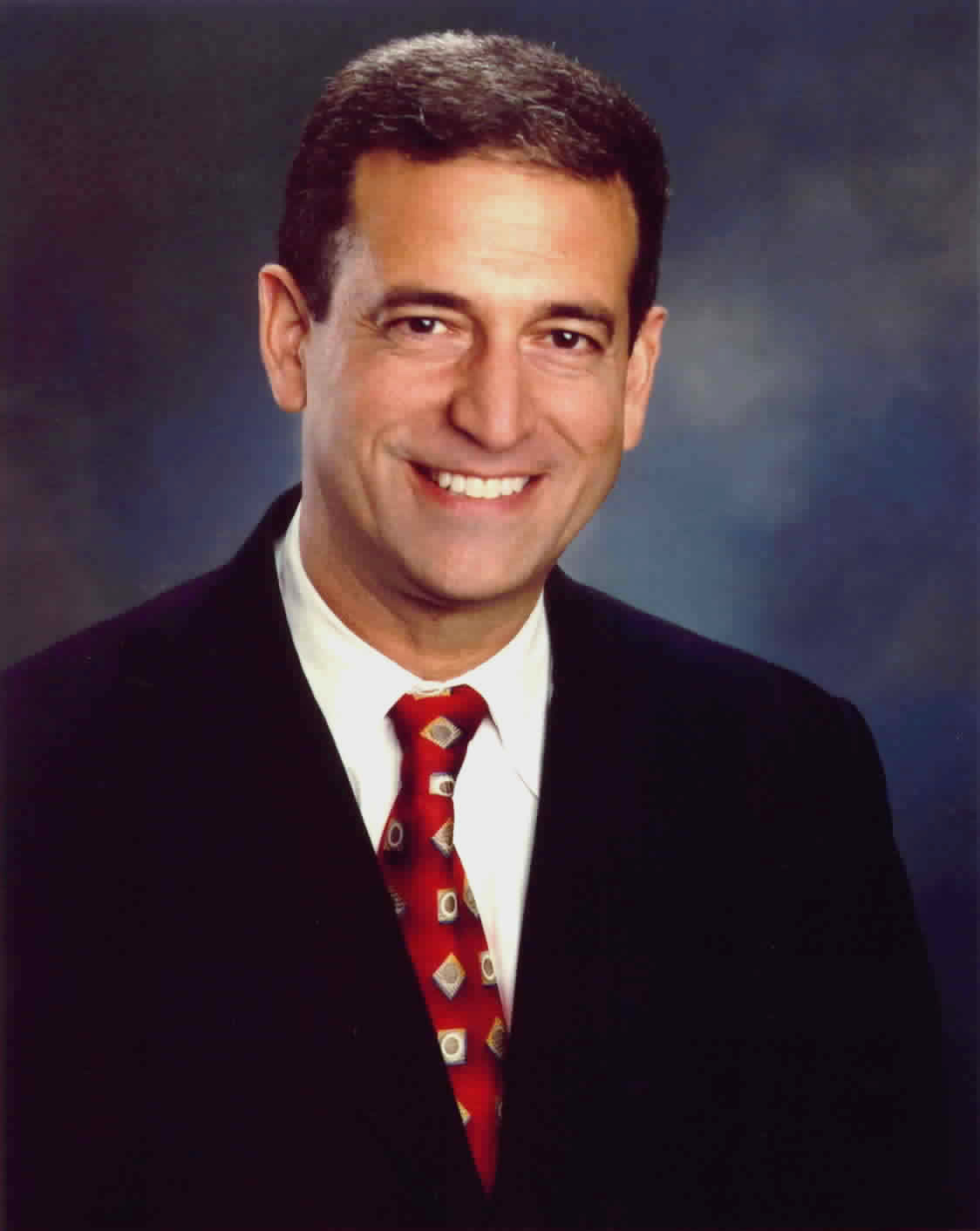

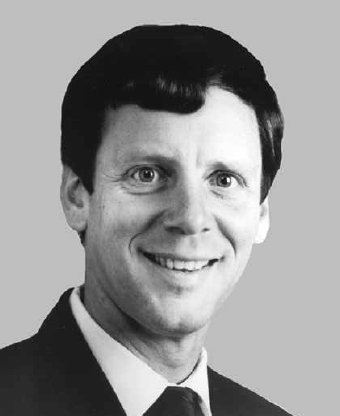
Nominee	Russ Feingold	Mark Neumann
Party	Democratic	Republican
Popular vote	890,059	852,272
Percentage	50.5%	48.4%
- Feingold: 40–50% 50–60% 60–70% Neumann: 40–50% 50–60% 60–70%
U.S. senator before election
Russ Feingold
Democratic
Elected U.S. Senator
Russ Feingold
Democratic

Incumbent Democrat Russ Feingold won re-election to a second term. In September 1997, Mark Neumann, a Republican U.S. representative, announced his candidacy for the Senate against Russell Feingold. Both candidates had similar views on the budget surplus, although Neumann was for banning partial-birth abortion, while Feingold was against a ban. Both candidates limited themselves to $3.8 million in campaign spending ($1 for every citizen of Wisconsin), although outside groups spent more than $2 million on Neumann; Feingold refused to have outside groups spend their own "soft money" on his behalf. Feingold defeated Neumann by a slim 2% margin in the election. According to the Milwaukee Journal-Sentinel, Neumann had a 30,000-vote margin outside Milwaukee County, but was overwhelmed by a 68,000-vote margin in Milwaukee County.

General election results
Party	Candidate	Votes	%	±%
Democratic	Russ Feingold (incumbent)	890,059	50.55%	
Republican	Mark Neumann	852,272	48.40%	
U.S. Taxpayers	Robert R. Raymond	7,942	0.45%	
Libertarian	Tom Ender	5,591	0.32%	
Independent	Eugene A. Hem	4,266	0.24%	
	Write-in votes	706	0.04%	
Majority		37,787	2.15%	
Turnout		1,760,836		
Democratic hold				

== See also ==
- 1998 United States elections
  - 1998 United States gubernatorial elections
  - 1998 United States House of Representatives elections
- 105th United States Congress
- 106th United States Congress
