= Marsha Kinder =

American film scholar (1940–2025)

Marsha Kinder (February 20, 1940 – November 26, 2025) was an American film scholar and Professor of Critical Studies at the University of Southern California.

== Background ==
Kinder began her career as a scholar of eighteenth-century English Literature before moving to the study of transmedia relations among various narrative art forms. From 1965 through 1980, she taught at Occidental College in the Dept. of English and Comparative Literature. With her colleague, William Moritz, Kinder introduced film studies into their curriculum. In 1980, she joined USC as a Professor of Critical Studies in the School of Cinematic Arts where she taught until 2012; Kinder's specialties included Spanish cinema, narrative theory, children's media culture, database documentaries, and digital culture.

Kinder died on November 26, 2025, at the age of 85.

== Published works ==
Kinder published more than one hundred essays and ten books (including monographs and anthologies). Her first essay, titled, "Antonioni in Transit," on the 1966 film Blow-up and its relationship to Michelangelo Antonioni's earlier films made in Italy, was published in the British film journal Sight & Sound in 1967.

Kinder's first two books, Close Up: A Critical Perspective on Film (1972) and Self and Cinema: A Transformalist Perspective (1980), were written in collaboration with Beverle Houston. She was best known for her works on Spanish cinema and culture, which include Blood Cinema: The Reconstruction of National Identity in Spain (1993), with a companion CD (the first interactive scholarly work in English language film studies), Refiguring Spain: Cinema, Media, Representation (1997), and Luis Buñuel's The Discreet Charm of the Bourgeoisie (1998).

Kinder's works on children's media culture include Playing with Power in Movies, Television and Video Games: From Muppet Babies to Teenage Mutant Ninja Turtles (1991), and Kids' Media Culture (1999). Kinder was founding editor of the journal Dreamworks (1980–87), a winner of a Pushcart Prize, and a contributor to The Spectator (1982–present). Beginning in 1977, she served on the editorial board of Film Quarterly. In 1995, Kinder received the USC Associates Award for Creativity in Scholarship, and in 2001 was named a University Professor for her innovative interdisciplinary research.

== Labyrinth projects ==
In 1997, Kinder founded The Labyrinth Project at USC, a research initiative on database narrative (a concept she introduced). At Labyrinth she produced database documentaries, archival cultural histories and other new models of digital scholarship in collaboration with media artists, filmmakers, writers, scholars, scientists, archivists, and cultural institutions. Combining cultural history and theory with the sensory language of the cinematic arts, these database documentaries are presented as transmedia networks (museum installations, DVD, digital archives, on-line courseware, print catalogues, books).

One of Kinder's first projects was with filmmaker Nina Menkes, entitled THE CRAZY BLOODY FEMALE CENTER. Menkes was allegedly unhappy that Kinder took liberties with her work, for example, adding shots to her work without her permission. Menkes' CD-ROM premiered at the Sundance Film Festival.

Many Labyrinth projects have been featured at museums, film and new media festivals, and conferences worldwide and have won prestigious awards, including: the New Media Envision Award for best design; the British Academy Award for best interactive project in the learning category; and the Jury Award at Sundance for New Narrative Forms. Three Labyrinth projects were featured in Center for Art and Media Karlsruhe's "Future Cinema" exhibition in Germany in 2002: Tracing the Decay of Fiction: Encounters with a Film by Pat O’Neill (2002); Bleeding Through Layers of Los Angeles, 1920 – 1986 (2002); and The Danube Exodus: The Rippling Currents of the River (2002). The latter work was an installation made in collaboration with Hungarian artist Péter Forgács, which premiered at the Los Angeles Getty Center in 2002 and is still touring worldwide.

Other projects have focused on science and health education: Three Winters in the Sun: Einstein in California (2005), which was exhibited at the Skirball Cultural Center in Los Angeles, and A Tale of Two MAO Genes: Exploring the Biology and Culture of Aggression and Anxiety, a project produced in collaboration with noted molecular biologist Professor Jean Chen Shih.

Labyrinth's most recent work is Jewish Homegrown History: Immigration, Identity and Intermarriage, which is a presented both as an on-line archive where users can upload stories and images of their family and a museum installation featuring large-scale projections of home movies. This installation had its premiere run at the Skirball Cultural Center (March 29 – September 2, 2012). Kinder was also a co-investigator with Mark Jonathan Harris on Interacting with Autism, a translational health-education website.

These Labyrinth projects have been supported by grants from the Annenberg Foundation, the Alan Casden Foundation, the Ford Foundation, the Getty Foundation, the Haas Foundation, the James Irvine Foundation, the National Endowment for the Humanities, the Righteous Persons Foundation, the Rockefeller Foundation, and the Skirball Foundation; and from AHRQ (Agency for Healthcare Research and Quality).

== Bibliography ==
- Blood Cinema: The Reconstruction of National Identity in Spain
- The Power of Adaptation in "Apocalypse Now"
- Face to Face: facial close-ups and joint attention in Science and the Visual Arts
- Music Video and the Spectator: Television, Ideology and Dream
- Re-Wiring Baltimore: The Emotive Power of Systemics, Seriality, and the City
- Review: Out of the Past: Spanish Cinema after Franco by John Hopewell
- Refiguring Spain: Cinema/Media/Representation
- Hot spots, avatars and narrative fields for ever: Buñuel's legacy for new digital media and interactive database narrative
- The Art of Dreaming in "Three Women" and "Providence": Structures of the Self
- Restoring Broken Embraces
