= Ezzard =

Ezzard is a given name and surname. Notable people with the name include:

- Ezzard Charles (1921–1975), American professional boxer
- Martha Ezzard (1938–2023), American politician
- William Ezzard (1799–1887), American politician
