= John D. Spreckels Building =

Coordinates: 32°42′55″N 117°9′31″W

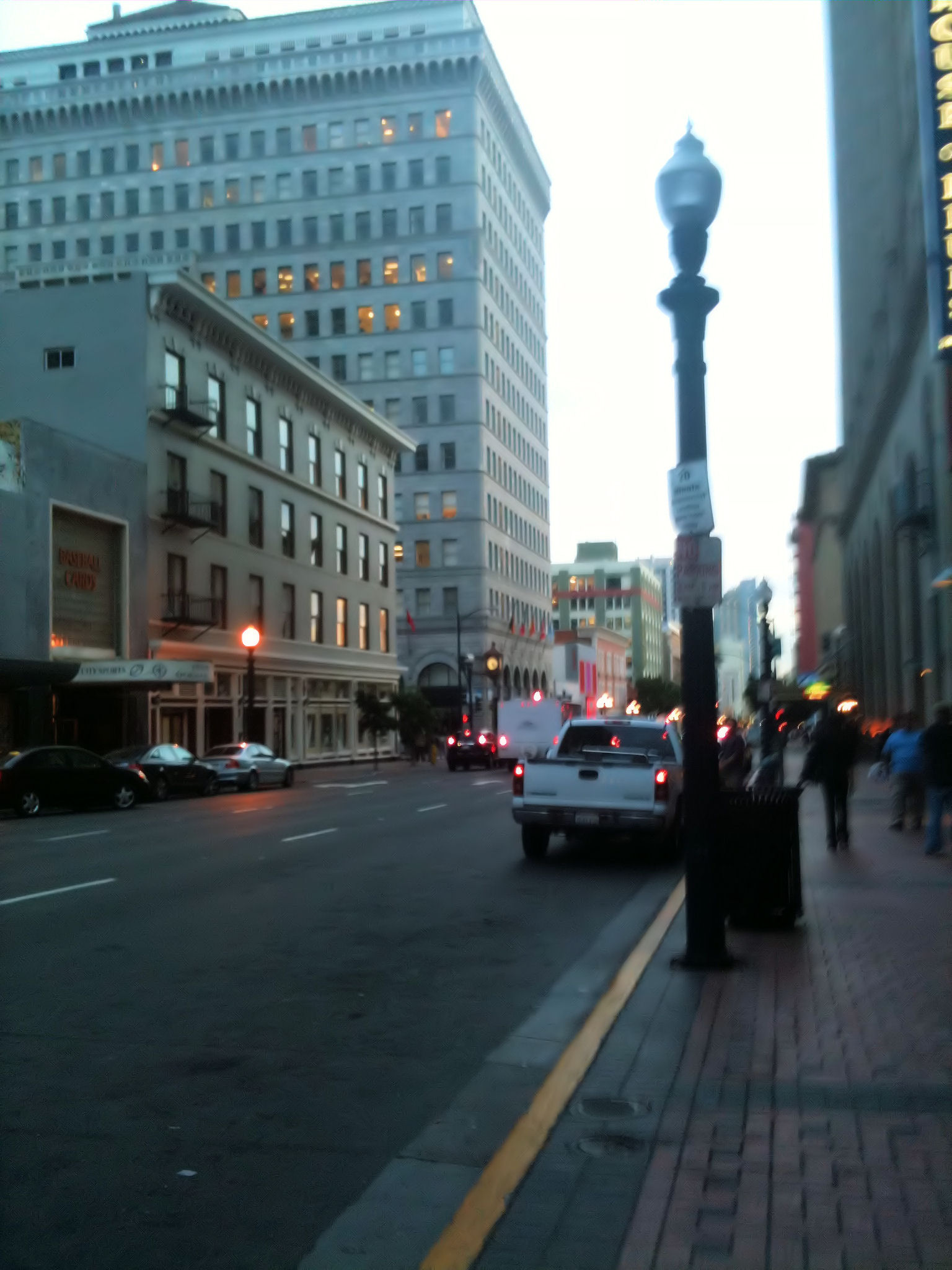
6th Avenue with John D. Spreckels Building

The John D. Spreckels Building is a 61 metres (200 ft) building in San Diego. Completed in 1924, it was the tallest building in San Diego until the El Cortez Hotel was built three years later. The building was designed by Los Angeles-area architects John and Donald Parkinson and features architectural terra cotta produced by Gladding, McBean.

Preceded by Broadway Lofts	Tallest Building in San Diego; 1924–1927; 61 m	Succeeded by El Cortez Hotel
