= 1992 United States Senate election in Colorado =

- November 3, 1992
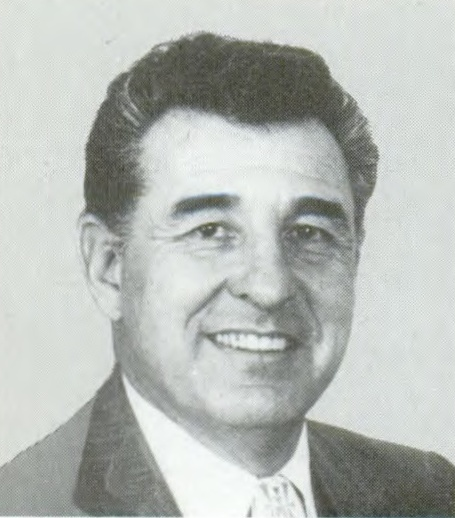

Nominee	Ben Nighthorse Campbell	Terry Considine
Party	Democratic	Republican
Popular vote	803,725	662,893
Percentage	51.78%	42.70%
- County results Nighthorse Campbell: 40–50% 50–60% 60–70% 70–80% Considine: 40–50% 50–60% 60–70%
U.S. senator before election
Tim Wirth
Democratic
Elected U.S. Senator
Ben Nighthorse Campbell
Democratic

The 1992 United States Senate election in Colorado was held on November 3, 1992. Incumbent Democrat Tim Wirth decided to retire instead of seeking a second term. The open seat was won by Democratic nominee Ben Nighthorse Campbell, who later switched parties in 1995 and was re-elected as a Republican in 1998.

== Democratic primary ==
=== Candidates ===
- Ben Nighthorse Campbell, U.S. Representative from Ignacio
- Josie Heath, former Boulder County Commissioner and nominee for the U.S. Senate in 1990
- Dick Lamm, former Governor of Colorado

=== Results ===
Democratic primary results by county Campbell: 40–50%; 50–60%; 60–70%; 70–80%; 80–90%; Lamm: 40–50%; 50–60%

Democratic Primary results
Party	Candidate	Votes	%
Democratic	Ben Nighthorse Campbell	117,634	45.48%
Democratic	Dick Lamm	93,599	36.19%
Democratic	Josie Heath	47,418	18.33%
Total votes		258,651	100.00%

== General election ==
=== Candidates ===
- Ben Nighthorse Campbell (D), U.S. Representative
- Terry Considine (R), State Senator

=== Results ===
General election results
Party	Candidate	Votes	%	±%
Democratic	Ben Nighthorse Campbell	803,725	51.78%	+1.86%
Republican	Terry Considine	662,893	42.70%	−5.66%
Independent	Richard O. Grimes	42,455	2.73%	
Pro-Life	Matt Noah	22,846	1.47%	
Independent	Dan Winters	20,347	1.31%	
Libertarian	Hue Futch	23	0.00%	
Majority		140,832	9.07%	+7.52%
Turnout		1,552,289		
Democratic hold		Swing		

== See also ==
- 1992 United States Senate elections
