= Ben Nighthorse Campbell =

American politician (1933–2025)

- Daev Moenha
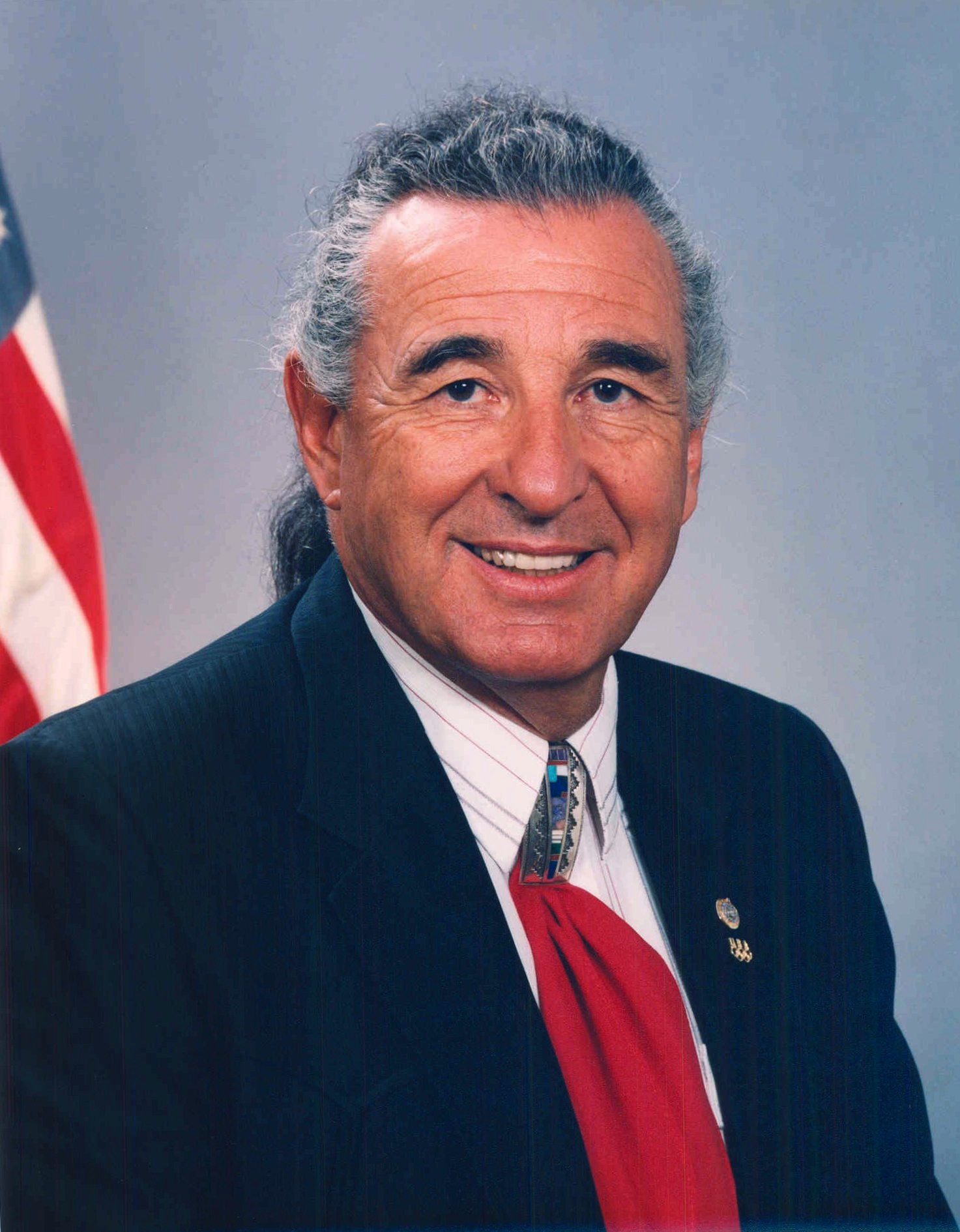
- Official portrait, c. 1997

Chair of the Senate Indian Affairs Committee
- In office January 3, 2003 – January 3, 2005
- Preceded by: Daniel Inouye
- Succeeded by: John McCain
- In office January 20, 2001 – June 6, 2001
- Preceded by: Daniel Inouye
- Succeeded by: Daniel Inouye
- In office January 3, 1997 – January 3, 2001
- Preceded by: John McCain
- Succeeded by: Daniel Inouye

United States Senator from Colorado
- In office January 3, 1993 – January 3, 2005
- Preceded by: Tim Wirth
- Succeeded by: Ken Salazar

Member of the U.S. House of Representatives from Colorado's 3rd district
- In office January 3, 1987 – January 3, 1993
- Preceded by: Michael Strang
- Succeeded by: Scott McInnis

Member of the Colorado House of Representatives from the 59th district
- In office January 1983 – January 1987
- Preceded by: Robert E. DeNier
- Succeeded by: Jim Dyer

Personal details
- Born: Benny Marshall Campbell; April 13, 1933 Auburn, California, U.S.
- Died: December 30, 2025 (aged 92) Ignacio, Colorado, U.S.
- Citizenship: American; Northern Cheyenne Tribe
- Party: Democratic (before 1995); Republican (1995–2025)
- Spouse: Linda Price (m. 1966)
- Children: 2
- Education: San Jose City College (attended); San Jose State University (BA); Meiji University

Military service
- Branch: United States Air Force
- Service years: 1951–1953
- Rank: Airman First Class E-4
- Conflict: Korean War
- Awards: Korean Service Medal; Air Medal
- Campbell's voice Campbell opens a Senate Indian Affairs Committee on Native American code talkers. Recorded September 22, 2004
Medal record
Men's judo
Representing the United States
Pan American Games
Gold medal – first place	1963 São Paulo	Open

Ben Nighthorse Campbell (Cheyenne: Daev Moenha, (Note: Possibly modern Cheyenne: Taa'évȧmo'éhno'ha) born Benny Marshall Campbell; April 13, 1933 – December 30, 2025) was an American politician and United States Air Force veteran who served in both chambers of the United States Congress, representing Colorado's 3rd congressional district in the United States House of Representatives from 1987 to 1993 and as a member of the United States Senate from 1993 to 2005. He served as one of the 44 members of the Council of Chiefs of the Cheyenne people. During his time in office, he was the only Native American serving in Congress. He was the last Native American elected to the U.S. Senate until the 2022 election of Markwayne Mullin (Cherokee Nation).

Originally a member of the Democratic Party, Campbell switched to the Republican Party on March 3, 1995. Reelected to the Senate in 1998, Campbell announced in March 2004 that he would not run for a third term. His seat was won by Democrat Ken Salazar in the November 2004 election. He later became a lobbyist for the law and lobbying firm Holland & Knight and afterward co-founded his own lobbying firm, Ben Nighthorse Consultants. Campbell died on December 30, 2025, at the age of 92.

== Early life ==
Campbell was born Benny Campbell in Auburn, California, on April 13, 1933. His mother, Mary Vierra (Vieira), was a Portuguese immigrant who had come at age six with her mother to the U.S. through Ellis Island. According to Campbell, his maternal grandfather had entered the U.S. some time before. The Vierra family settled in the large Portuguese community near Sacramento. When Mary Vierra contracted tuberculosis in her youth, she was forced to convalesce at a nearby hospital, often for months at a time during treatment. It was there that she met Ben's father, Albert Valdez Campbell, who was at the hospital for alcoholism treatment.

Albert Valdez Campbell was a World War I Army veteran from Pagosa Springs, Colorado. According to Campbell biographer Herman Viola, Albert "claimed to be a Cheyenne Indian who, about the age of twelve, ran away from home in Pagosa Springs, Colorado, and went to join his relatives on the Northern Cheyenne Reservation in southeastern Montana". Ben Campbell said, "My father instisted we keep our Indian background a secret". Viola writes that "birth certificates ... and other potentially useful documents ... were nonexistent". Albert said "his mother — Ben had never known his grandmother's name — was a Cheyenne related to the Black Horse family ..."

Ben Campbell's parents married in 1929, and he was born in 1933. During Campbell's childhood, his father continued to have problems with alcoholism, often leaving the family for weeks and months at a time. His mother continued to have problems with tuberculosis, a highly contagious disease that limited the contact she could have with her children and forced her into the hospital for long periods. These problems led Ben and his sister, Alberta (who died in an apparent suicide at age 44), to spend much of their early lives in nearby Catholic orphanages. As a young man, Campbell was introduced to the Japanese martial art of judo by Japanese immigrant families he met while working in local agricultural fields.

== Military service and education ==
Campbell attended Placer High School, dropping out in 1951 to join the U.S. Air Force. He was stationed in Korea during the Korean War as an air policeman; he left the Air Force in 1953 with the rank of Airman Second Class, as well as the Korean Service Medal and the Air Medal. While in the Air Force, Campbell obtained his GED and, after his discharge, used the G.I. Bill to attend San Jose City College and then San Jose State University, graduating in 1957 with a Bachelor of Arts in physical education and fine arts.

He is listed as Ben M. Campbell in his college records and records of his Olympic competition, but was given the name "Nighthorse" when he returned to the Northern Cheyenne reservation for his name-giving ceremony, as a member of his father's family, Blackhorse.

== Career ==
=== Sports ===
In college, Campbell was a member of the San Jose State judo team, coached by future USA Olympic coach Yosh Uchida. While training for the Olympic Games, Campbell attended Meiji University in Tokyo, Japan, as a special research student from 1960 to 1964. The Meiji team was world-renowned and Campbell credited the preparation and discipline taught at Meiji for his 1961, 1962, and 1963 U.S. National titles and his gold medal in the 1963 Pan-American Games. In 1964, Campbell competed in judo at the 1964 Summer Olympics in Tokyo. This made him the first Native American on the U.S. Olympic judo team. He suffered an injury and did not win a medal. He broke his ankle and was out for two years.

In the years after returning from the Olympic Games, Campbell worked as a deputy sheriff in Sacramento County, California, coached the U.S. national judo team, operated his own dojo in Sacramento, and taught high school (physical education and art classes). He and his wife also raised quarterhorses, including a Supreme Champion and AQHA Champion, Sailors Night. They bought a ranch near Ignacio, Colorado, on the Southern Ute reservation in 1978.

=== Jewelry ===
Prior to his career in politics, Campbell was a jewelry maker with a booth at Indian Market in Santa Fe. In Herman Viola's book Ben Nighthorse Campbell: An American Warrior, Campbell recounted learning to make jewelry from his father and flattening silver dollars on train tracks for the materials. He also used techniques learned from sword makers in Japan and other non-traditional techniques to win over 200 national and international awards for jewelry design under the name Ben Nighthorse, and in the late 1970s was included in a feature article in the magazine Arizona Highways about Native artists experimenting in the "new look" of Indian jewelry. There are works by Campbell on display with the Art of the Olympians organization as well.

=== Politics ===
Campbell was elected to the Colorado State Legislature as a Democrat in November 1982, and served two terms. He was voted one of the 10 Best Legislators by his colleagues in a 1986 Denver Post – News Center 4 survey.

==== U.S. House of Representatives ====
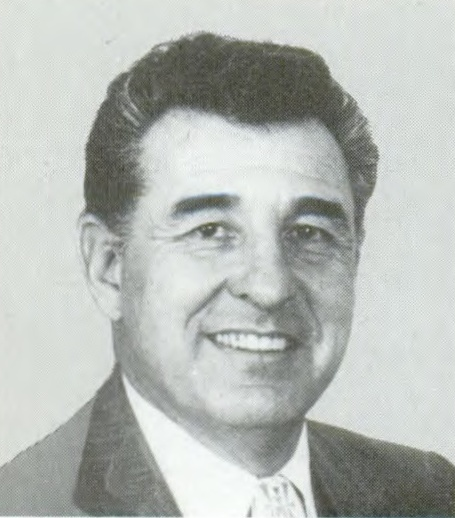
Campbell's congressional photograph (1991).

In 1986, Campbell was elected to the U.S. House of Representatives, defeating incumbent Michael L. Strang; he was reelected twice to this seat. In 1989, he authored the bill HR 2668 to establish the National Museum of the American Indian, which became PL 101–185.

==== U.S. Senate ====
The early 1990s marked a turning point in Campbell's political career. In 1992, after U.S. Senate member Tim Wirth announced his retirement, Campbell won a three-way Democratic primary against former three-term Governor Richard Lamm and Boulder County Commissioner Josie Heath, who had been the party's nominee in 1990. During the primary campaign, Lamm supporters accused Heath of "spoiling" the election by splitting the vote of the party's left wing. Heath's campaign argued that it was Campbell who should not have run, because his voting record in Congress had been much more like that of a Republican. Campbell won the primary with 45% of the vote and defeated Republican State Senator Terry Considine in the general election. He was the first Native American elected to the United States Senate since Charles Curtis in the 1920s.

In March 1995, after two years in office, Campbell switched parties from Democratic to Republican in the wake of publicized disputes he had with the Colorado Democratic Party. Campbell said the last straw was the Senate's defeat of the balanced-budget amendment, which he had championed since coming to Washington as a congressman in 1987. Others attributed the switch to personal hostility within the Democratic Party in Colorado.

In 1998, Campbell was reelected to the Senate by what was then the largest margin in Colorado history for a statewide race. After winning reelection, Campbell identified as a moderate Republican, saying that his reelection "shows the moderate voices within the Republican Party are dominating". During the Impeachment trial of Bill Clinton, Campbell voted to convict President Clinton on both articles of impeachment against him; in his final statement before the vote, he said: "I took a solemn oath. Simply speaking, the president did too. And, so even though I like him personally, I find I can only vote one way. And that is guilty on both articles." Clinton was acquitted on both counts as neither received the necessary two-thirds vote of the senators present for conviction and removal from office.

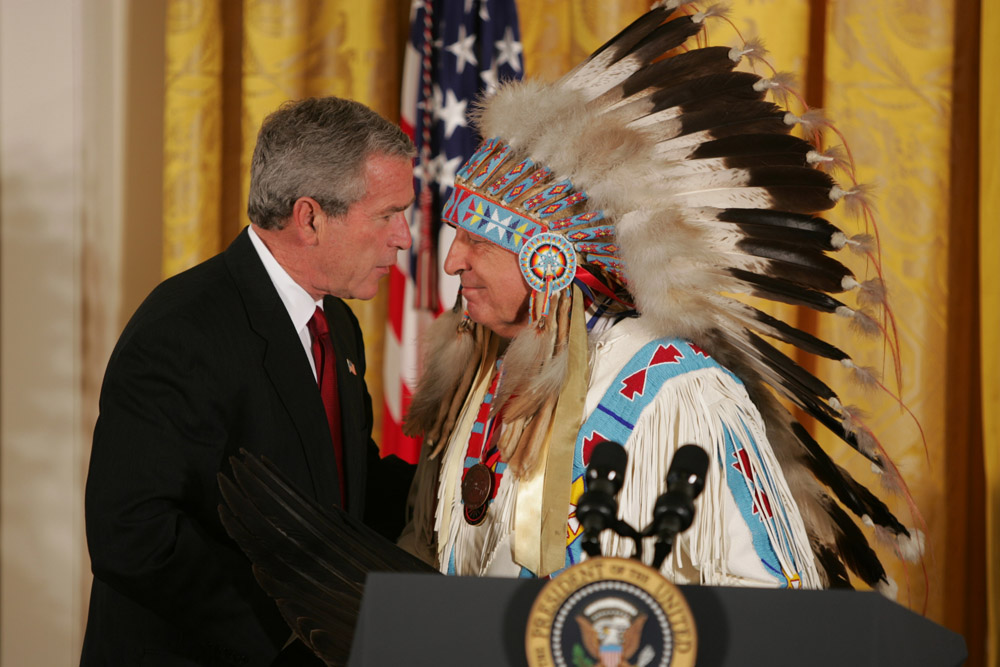
Campbell with President George W. Bush in 2004

In the 106th Congress, Campbell passed more public laws than any other member of Congress. During his tenure, he also became the first American Indian to chair the Senate Indian Affairs Committee. While in the Senate, Campbell voted to support the U.S. Supreme Court's Roe v. Wade decision. He gradually became more conservative during his tenure, reversing his position on late-term abortions and voting for the Defense of Marriage Act. However, in 2004, he was one of six Republicans who voted against the Federal Marriage Amendment, a constitutional amendment intended to ban same-sex marriage, on the grounds that it should be left to the states.

The U.S. Senate Select Committee on Ethics investigated accusations that Campbell's former chief of staff, Virginia Kontnik, inflated bonuses to an aide in 2002 so he could return the money to her. In subsequent interviews, Kontnik claimed that Campbell had approved the deal, which he denied.

After the prisoner abuse in Iraq by American military personnel and viewing unpublished abuse images alongside United States Secretary of Defense Donald Rumsfeld's Senate testimony, Campbell admonished the administration and military leadership: "I don't know how the hell these people got into our army."

On March 3, 2004, Campbell announced that he would not seek reelection due to health concerns, having recently been treated for prostate cancer and heartburn. He retired from office in January 2005, later saying of his decision: "Somewhere along the line, I said 'I'm not gonna die in this place. I want to do what I can, but I'm not dying here.'" He is the last Republican to be elected to the Class 3 Senate seat from Colorado.

=== Post-congressional work ===
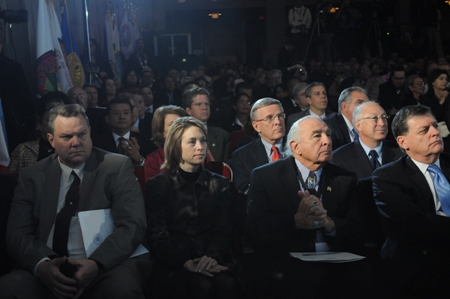
Campbell, together with Chickasaw Congressman Tom Cole (R-OK) and other government officials listening to a speech by then-president Barack Obama (December 2010).

After his retirement, Campbell was a senior policy advisor at the firm of Holland and Knight, LLP, in Washington, D.C. In 2012, he left that firm to found Ben Nighthorse Consultants, a new lobbying firm. He also continued to design and craft his Ben Nighthorse line of American Indian jewelry.

Completed in 2011, Lake Nighthorse, a 120,000-acre-foot (150,000,000 m^{3}) reservoir in southwestern Colorado, is named in his honor.

Campbell was a member of the ReFormers Caucus of Issue One.

In 2008, during the Cherokee freedmen controversy, Campbell authored a piece in The Hill criticizing the efforts of members of Congress attempting to terminate recognition of the Cherokee Nation's government, and condemning the lawmakers' "paternalistic efforts":

"In the past, interference with tribal affairs, often justified by a paternalistic 'we know best' mindset, has severely damaged the progress of tribes. Often, Congress not only didn't know best, but it based its decision on lies, mistaken assumptions and prejudice...Congress is again rushing to judgment when it thinks it knows better than the tribe and the courts."

Campbell endorsed then-Ohio governor John Kasich in the 2016 Republican presidential primaries.

In July 2016, Campbell spoke to Colorado Public Radio about regretting his support of the Iraq War: "I have some misgivings about the way I voted but we were voting on the best information that we had at the time. I think if there was a weakness early on [it] is that the administration had several people in there really pushing for American involvement...In retrospect after seeing that there [were] no weapons of mass destruction and that we did not have really good intelligence on the ground to give us some guidance on how we should proceed, I now look back and think maybe I shouldn't have voted the way I did."

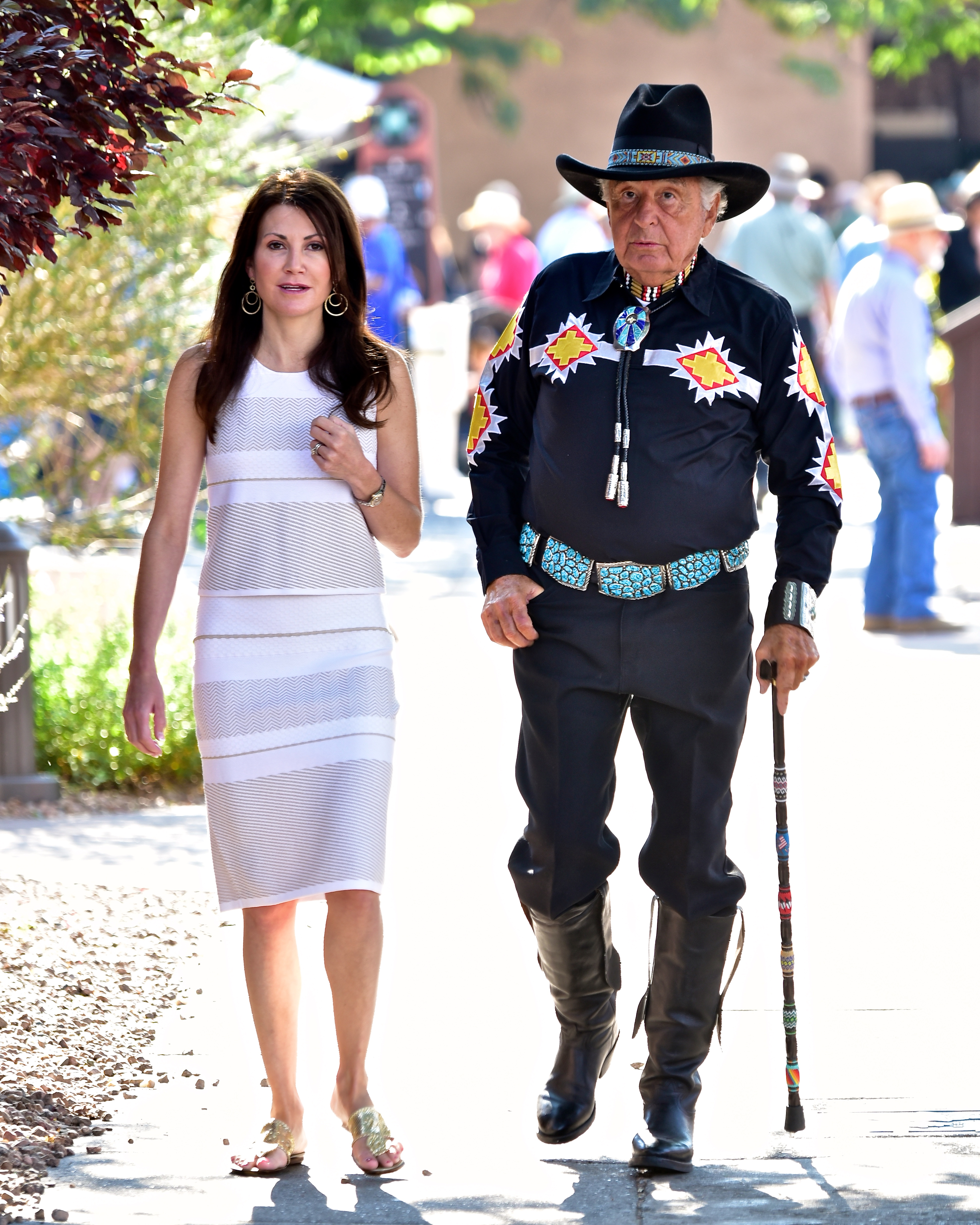
Retired senator Ben Nighthorse Campbell, along with his daughter Shanan Campbell Wells, visiting the Santa Fe Indian Market in August 2015

In late 2018, Campbell joined several former Republican and Democratic senators in signing a letter supporting then-Special Counsel Robert Mueller's investigation into alleged Russian collusion in the 2016 U.S. election. But he opposed the impeachment of President Donald Trump, defending Trump and calling it "a waste of time". He also questioned why the Democrats would move to impeach knowing they would fail to convict in the Senate, saying, "The cost of this and what it does to the country, it kind of tears the fabric of the nation apart."

In October 2020, Campbell appeared on Indian Country Today to speak on a variety of issues, including his party switch in 1995 and promoting free enterprise for Native Americans. He defended his switch to the Republican Party, and when asked whether its policies were better for Native peoples, he replied: "The head of the Ku Klux Klan was not a Republican, it was a Democrat. It wasn't a Republican who put 350,000 Japanese Americans in prison without any legal authority to do it, that was a Democrat, Roosevelt. And Andrew Jackson drove the Trail of Tears, of the Cherokees, the Chickasaws, the Choctaws, and many other tribes, taking their land by force. That wasn't a Republican that did that. That was a Democrat...so when people say the Democrat Party has been more willing to help Native Americans, I dispute that. That's not true." He went on to say how optimistic he was that more Native people were becoming involved and running for office, expressed support for Trump and his immigration policies, and voiced his concern with the rise of antifa.

In September 2021, Campbell endorsed Olympic athlete and Air Force veteran Eli Bremer in the Colorado Republican primary for the 2022 U.S. Senate race to challenge Democrat Michael Bennet. After Bremer lost the primary, Campbell endorsed Republican nominee Joe O'Dea in June 2022.

== Personal life and death ==
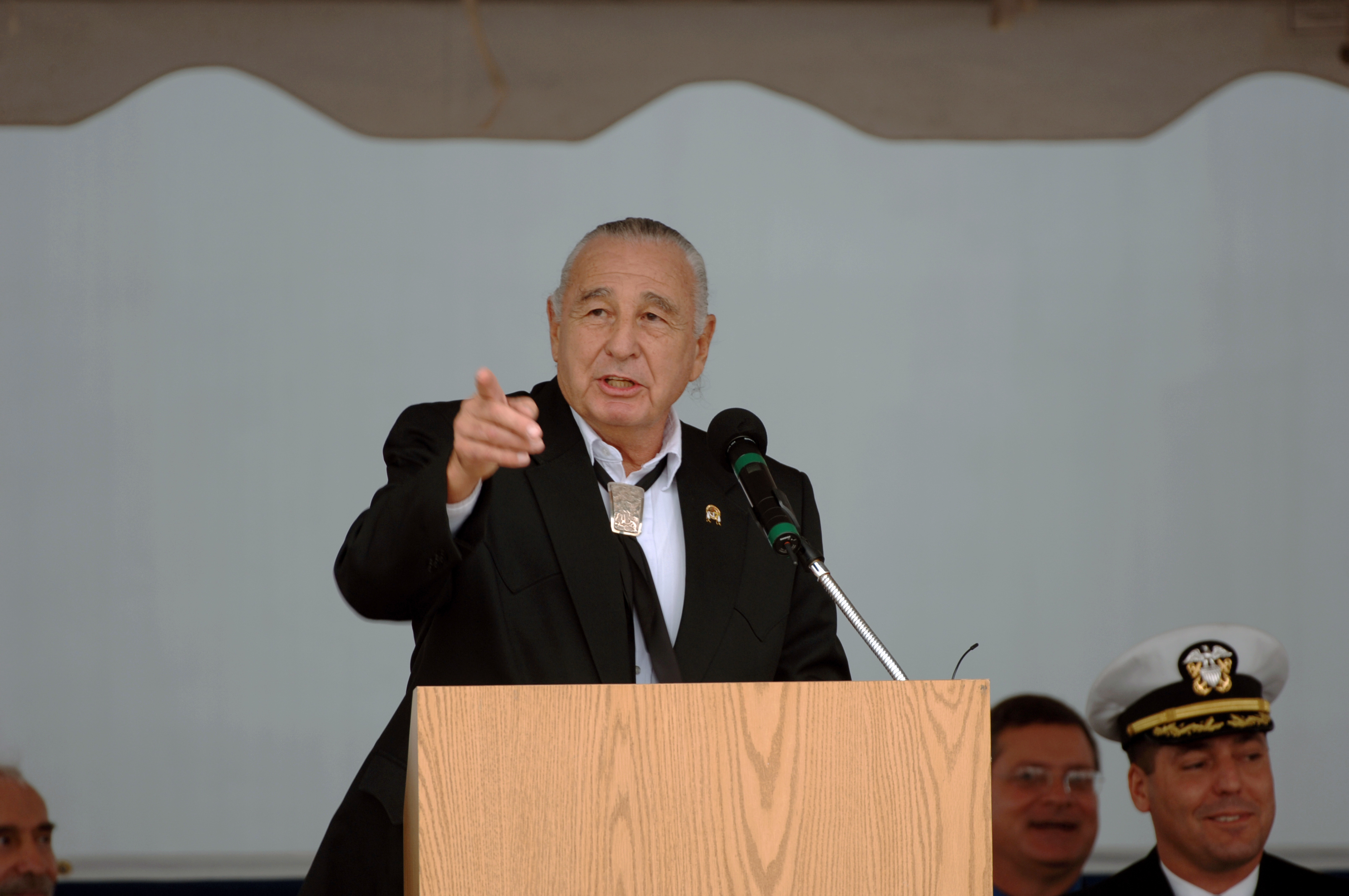
Campbell speaks at the commissioning of the USS Mesa Verde (LPD 19) in 2007

In 1966, Campbell married the former Linda Price, a public school teacher who was a native of Colorado. They had two children and four grandchildren.

Linda Campbell was the sponsor of USS Mesa Verde (LPD 19), which was commissioned in 2007.

Lake Nighthorse in La Plata County, Colorado, is named in Campbell's honor.

Campbell died at his Colorado ranch on December 30, 2025, at the age of 92. His passing was mourned by Colorado politicians across the aisle, including Democratic senator John Hickenlooper, former Republican senator Cory Gardner, and Republican congresswoman Lauren Boebert, who represented Campbell's old House district from 2021 to 2025.

== Electoral history ==
Colorado House of Representatives 59th district election, 1982
Primary election
Party	Candidate	Votes	%
Democratic	Ben Campbell	2,173	100.0
Total votes		2,173	100.0
General election
Democratic	Ben Campbell	8,441	53.91
Republican	Donald F. Whalen	7,216	46.09
Total votes		15,657	100.0
Democratic gain from Republican			

Colorado House of Representatives 59th district election, 1984
Primary election
Party	Candidate	Votes	%
Democratic	Ben Nighthorse Campbell (incumbent)	3,059	100.0
Total votes		3,059	100.0
General election
Democratic	Ben Nighthorse Campbell (incumbent)	14,405	71.80
Republican	Patricia "Patsi" Hart	5,658	28.20
Total votes		20,063	100.0
Democratic hold			

1986 Colorado's 3rd congressional district election
Primary election
Party	Candidate	Votes	%
Democratic	Ben Nighthorse Campbell	29,422	100.0
Total votes		29,422	100.0
General election
Democratic	Ben Nighthorse Campbell	95,353	51.86
Republican	Michael L. Strang (incumbent)	88,508	48.14
Total votes		183,861	100.0
Democratic gain from Republican			

1988 Colorado's 3rd congressional district election
Primary election
Party	Candidate	Votes	%
Democratic	Ben Nighthorse Campbell (incumbent)	31,828	100.0
Total votes		31,828	100.0
General election
Democratic	Ben Nighthorse Campbell (incumbent)	169,284	78.04
Republican	Jim Zartman	47,625	21.96
Total votes		216,909	100.0
Democratic hold			

1990 Colorado's 3rd congressional district election
Primary election
Party	Candidate	Votes	%
Democratic	Ben Nighthorse Campbell (incumbent)	36,722	100.0
Total votes		36,722	100.0
General election
Democratic	Ben Nighthorse Campbell (incumbent)	124,487	70.19
Republican	Bob Ellis	49,961	28.17
Colorado Populist Party	Howard E. Fields	2,915	1.64
Total votes		177,363	100.0
Democratic hold			

1992 U.S. Senate election in Colorado
Primary election
Party	Candidate	Votes	%
Democratic	Ben Nighthorse Campbell	117,634	45.48
Democratic	Richard D. Lamm	93,599	36.19
Democratic	Josie Heath	47,418	18.33
Total votes		258,651	100.0
General election
Democratic	Ben Nighthorse Campbell	803,125	51.78
Republican	Terry Considine	662,893	42.70
Perot's Independents	Richard O. Grimes	42,455	2.73
Christian Pro-Life	Matt Noah	22,846	1.47
Independent	Dan Winters	20,347	1.31
Libertarian	Hue Futch	23	0.00
Total votes		1,552,289	100.0
Democratic hold			

1998 U.S. Senate election in Colorado
Primary election
Party	Candidate	Votes	%
Republican	Ben Nighthorse Campbell (incumbent)	154,641	70.59
Republican	Bill Eggert	64,329	29.37
Write-in		101	0.05
Total votes		219,065	100.0
General election
Republican	Ben Nighthorse Campbell (incumbent)	826,966	62.47
Democratic	Dottie Lamm	463,435	35.01
Libertarian	David Segel	14,112	1.07
Constitution	Kevin Swanson	9,868	0.75
Natural Law	Jeffrey Peckham	3,912	0.30
Concerns of People	John Heckman	3,230	0.24
US Pacifist Party	Gary Swing	1,903	0.14
Write-in		357	0.03
Total votes		1,323,783	100.0
Republican hold			

== Honors ==
- Grand-Officer of the Order of Prince Henry, Portugal (1 June 1998)
- 2008: Awarded Ellis Island Medal of Freedom
- Order of the Rising Sun, Gold Rays with Neck Ribbon by Japanese Emperor Akihito. Sen. Ben Nighthorse Campbell's award is in recognition of his significant contribution in the promotions and mutual understanding between Japan and the United States (2011)
- November 2021: Inducted into National Native American Hall of Fame in Oklahoma City, Oklahoma
- 2025: President Gene Small of the Northern Cheyenne Tribe designated December 31, 2025, as "Ben Nighthorse Campbell Day"
- April 2026: Honorary Doctorate awarded posthumously during a celebration of his life by SJSU president Cynthia Teniente-Matson, in recognition of his illustrious career and service to the community.

== See also ==
- List of American politicians who switched parties in office
- List of Native American artists
- List of Native Americans in the United States Congress
- List of Native American politicians
- Native American jewelry
- List of United States senators who switched parties

== Notes ==
U.S. House of Representatives
Preceded by Michael Strang	Member of the U.S. House of Representatives from Colorado's 3rd congressional district 1987–1993	Succeeded by Scott McInnis
Party political offices
Preceded by Tim Wirth	Democratic nominee for U.S. Senator from Colorado (Class 3); 1992	Succeeded by Dottie Lamm
Preceded by Terry Considine	Republican nominee for U.S. Senator from Colorado (Class 3); 1998	Succeeded by Pete Coors
U.S. Senate
Preceded by Tim Wirth	U.S. Senator (Class 3) from Colorado; 1993–2005; Served alongside: Hank Brown, Wayne Allard	Succeeded by Ken Salazar
Preceded by John McCain	Chair of the Senate Indian Affairs Committee; 1997–2001	Succeeded by Dan Inouye
Preceded by Chris Smith	Chair of the Joint Helsinki Commission; 2001–2003	Succeeded by Chris Smith
Preceded by Dan Inouye	Chair of the Senate Indian Affairs Committee; 2003–2005	Succeeded by John McCain
