= Aimco =

Real estate investment trust

Apartment Investment and Management Company
- Type: Public
- Traded as: NYSE: AIV; Russell 2000 component
- Industry: Real estate investment trust
- Founded: 1975; 51 years ago (as "The Considine Company, Inc."); 1994; 32 years ago (Merged with Property Asset Management & PDI, Inc.)
- Founder: Terry Considine
- Headquarters: Denver, Colorado, U.S.
- Key people: R. Dary Stone (chairman); Wes Powell (president & CEO); Lynn Stanfield (CFO)
- Products: Apartments
- Revenue: ▲US$208 million (2024)
- Net income: ▲ -US$102 million (2024)
- Total assets: ▼US$1.956 billion (2024)
- Total equity: ▼US$122 million (2024)
- Number of employees: 58 (2024)
- Website: aimco.com

Apartment Investment and Management Company, commonly referred to as Aimco, is an American publicly traded real estate investment trust. As of December 31, 2024, the company owned 24 apartment communities comprising 5,243 apartment units as well as one hotel.

== History ==
Aimco traces its roots to The Considine Company, formed in 1975 by Terry Considine. Aimco was incorporated on January 10, 1994 and became a public company via an initial public offering on July 29, 1994.

=== Major acquisitions ===
Year	Company	Notes	Ref
1996	Walters Management Company		
1996	J.W. English Company		
1997	Apartment portfolio of Winthrop	8,175 apartments	
1997	NHP	87,659 apartments	
1998	Apartment division of Insignia Financial Group	Price was $910 million	
2000	Oxford and affiliates	36,662 apartment units	
2002	Casden	Founded by Alan Casden; owned 17,383 apartments, price was $206 million in stock and $198 million in cash	

=== Major divestitures ===
Year	Company	Notes	Ref
2018	Affordable apartments business	Sold to Related Companies	
2020	Stabilized apartments	Corporate spin-off of Apartment Income REIT Corp.; acquired by The Blackstone Group	
