= Terry Considine =

American businessman, politician, and philanthropist (born 1947)

Terry M. Considine
- Born: 1947 (age 78–79); San Diego, California, U.S.
- Education: Harvard University (BA: 1969; JD: 1971)
- Known for: Founder of Aimco; Former member of Colorado Senate

Terry M. Considine (born 1947) is the founder of Aimco and a former Republican politician.

== Biography ==
=== Early life and education ===
Considine was born in San Diego as the 4th of 11 children of an Irish Catholic family and was raised on a cattle ranch in Southern California. At age 13, he left California to attend the Groton School, a private boarding school in Groton, Massachusetts; he graduated in 1965.

In 1969, Considine graduated from Harvard University with a Bachelor of Arts degree; in 1971 he received a Juris Doctor from Harvard. He initially received a student deferment from the Vietnam War and was later disqualified for service because of a bad back.

=== Business career ===
After graduating, he worked for Cabot, Cabot, and Forbes, which sponsored a real estate investment trust under his leadership.

In 1975, after the 1973–1975 recession, he founded The Considine Companies, a property-management firm that specialized in troubled real estate. In 1981, he moved to Colorado.

In 1981, he acquired the El Cortez Hotel in partnership with the Bass Brothers from Morris Cerullo. He sold his interest to the Bass Brothers and they sold the hotel in 1987.

In 1987, he acquired 75% of McDermott, Stein and Ira Marketing Management (MSI), the largest fee-operated apartment management company in Denver.

In 1994, along with associates Steve Ira, Peter Kompaniez, and Robert Lacey, he contributed his apartment business to form Aimco, which became a public company via an initial public offering that year.

=== Politics ===
In Colorado, Considine entered politics through his father-in-law, Bo Callaway.

In the 1986 United States Senate election in Colorado, Considine ran unsuccessfully for the Republican nomination to the United States Senate. His campaign adviser was Fox News executive Roger Ailes. The campaign was thrown into controversy after he called immigrants from Latin America "wetbacks". He then embarked on a $500,000 television advertising campaign.

In 1987, Considine edged out conservative Representative Phil Pankey and was appointed to fill the vacancy in the Colorado Senate created when Senator Martha Ezzard resigned upon switching from the Republican Party to the Democratic Party. He took office March 4, 1987 and served in the 56th, 57th, and 58th General Assemblies, serving until 1991. In January 1991, Tom Blickensderfer was appointed to succeed Considine. He was the primary organizer of an initiative that led to Colorado being the first state to impose term limits on the governor and state legislature. He left the state Senate early in 1992 to pursue the open seat in the United States Senate created by the decision of Democrat Tim Wirth to forgo a bid for a second term. Considine was defeated in the 1992 United States Senate election in Colorado by Democratic Congressman Ben Nighthorse Campbell who switched parties and became Republican in 1995.

Considine is a co-founder of Club for Growth, a conservative organization, and is a member of the board of trustees of Colorado Christian University.

His political contributions have been almost exclusively to members of the Republican Party.

=== Awards and recognition ===
- January 2017 - Elected to the Colorado Business Hall of Fame.
- May 2019 - Awarded an honorary degree from Colorado Christian University.
- October 2019 - Honored by Economic Literacy Colorado.
- 2020 - Elected to the Colorado Apartment Hall of Fame.

== Personal life ==
Considine is married to Betsy Callaway Considine and they live in Cherry Hills Village, Colorado. The couple are actively involved in education reform and ranching in western Colorado. They have three adult children and three grandchildren.

=== Philanthropy ===
Considine and his wife Betsy Callaway Considine provide charitable support, primarily to education and faith-based causes, including Compositive Primary, a workplace primary school on the Anschutz Medical Campus in Aurora, Colorado.

Considine and his wife have established the Considine Family Foundation. In 2017, it endowed a Harvard Law School professorship in honor of Antonin Scalia.

Considine was formerly chairperson of the Bradley Foundation.

Party political offices
Preceded by Ken Kramer	Republican Party nominee for United States Senator from Colorado (Class 3); 1992	Succeeded by Ben Nighthorse Campbell
