= Dottie Lamm =

American feminist

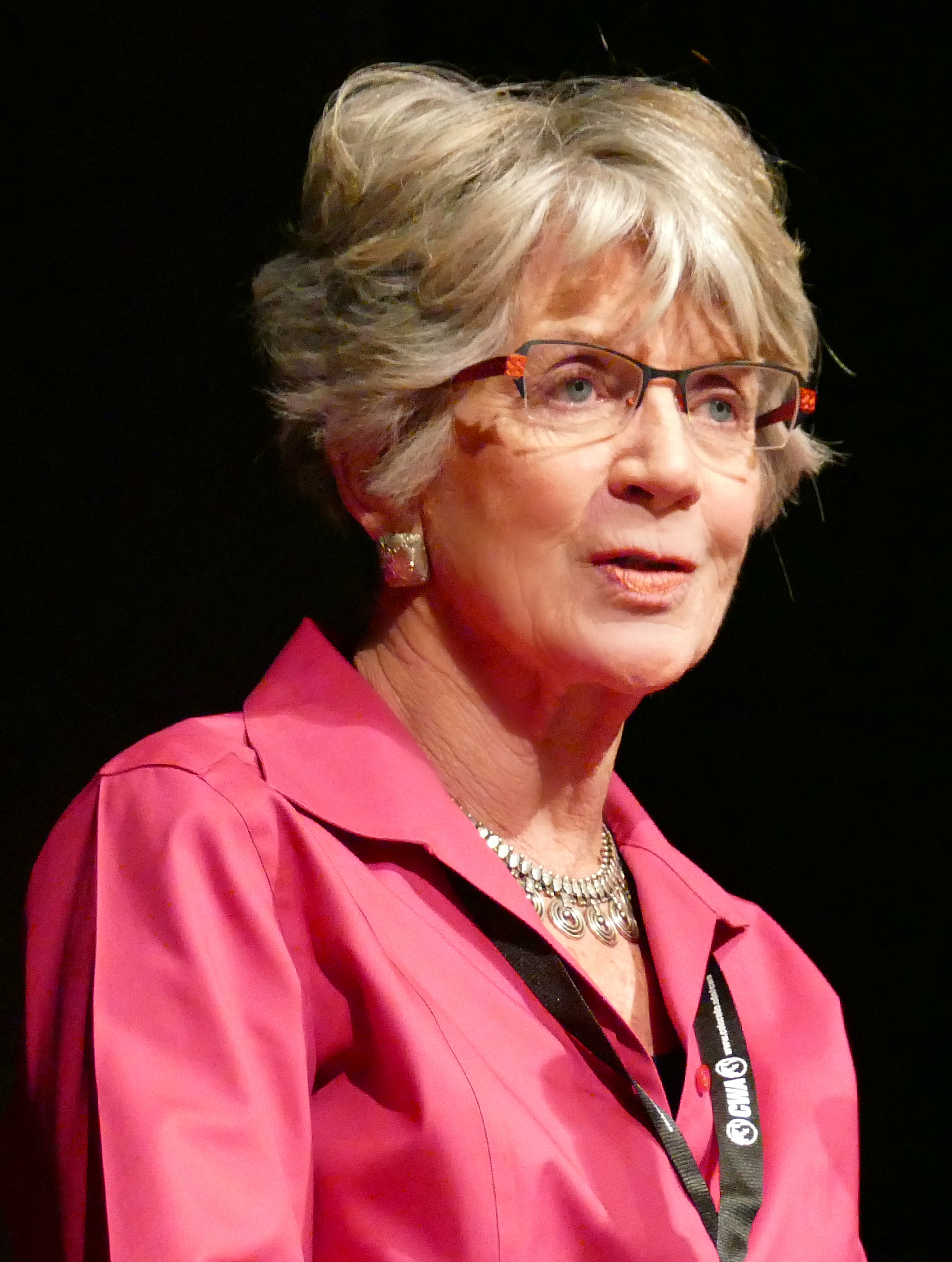
- Lamm in 2015

First Lady of Colorado
- In role January 14, 1975 – January 13, 1987
- Governor: Richard Lamm
- Preceded by: Ruthie Vanderhoof
- Succeeded by: Bea Romer

Personal details
- Born: Dorothy Louise Vennard; May 23, 1937 (age 89) New York City, New York, U.S.
- Party: Democratic
- Spouse: Richard Lamm (m. 1963; died 2021)
- Children: 2
- Education: Occidental College (BA); University of Denver (MSW)

Dorothy Louise Vennard Lamm (born May 23, 1937) is an American feminist, women's rights activist, educator, author, and speaker. She was First Lady of Colorado during her husband Richard Lamm's three terms as Governor of Colorado (1975–1987). In 1998, was the unsuccessful Democratic nominee in the election for United States Senate in Colorado. She wrote a weekly column for The Denver Post from 1979 to 1996 and later published three books. She was inducted into the Colorado Women's Hall of Fame in 1985.

== Early life and education ==
Dorothy Louise Vennard was born in New York City in 1937. She has one sister. She grew up in Palo Alto, California, where her father worked as a civil engineer. She earned a BA at Occidental College in Los Angeles.

After college, she began working out of Denver as a stewardess for United Airlines. She met Richard Lamm at a party in 1959; they married in 1963. She then began working as a psychiatric social worker. In 1967 Lamm earned her Master of Social Work at the University of Denver.

== Political career ==
=== First Lady of Colorado, 1975–1987 ===
Lamm was the First Lady of Colorado during her husband's three terms as governor from 1975 to 1987. She used her position as a platform to advance issues such as reproductive rights, equal pay for equal work, and child care. From 1976 to 1977 she chaired the Governor's Task Force on Children and served as a member of the Colorado Commission on Women.

After a women's magazine published excerpts from the journal she had kept during her husband's gubernatorial campaign, she proposed a weekly column for The Denver Post. Her column, in which she discussed her personal life and aired her political, social, and feminist views, ran from 1979 to 1996.

=== Political appointee ===
President Bill Clinton named Lamm as a member of the official United States delegation to the 1994 United Nations Conference on Population and Development, held in Cairo. Clinton also named her as a delegate to the Fourth World Conference on Women, held in Beijing in 1995.

=== 1998 campaign for United States Senate ===
In 1997 Lamm declared her intention to run for United States Senator from Colorado on the Democratic ticket. Her opponent would be Ben Nighthorse Campbell, who had won the Senate seat as a Democrat in 1992 (defeating Richard Lamm for the Democratic party nomination), but who had changed his party affiliation to Republican in 1995. She won the Democratic state primary in August with 57 percent of the vote, to 43 percent garnered by State Representative Gil Romero.

Lamm's campaign called for improvements in the state's fiscal, educational, and environmental policies in order to benefit children. The Washington Post wrote:

Lamm held up a thick stack of papers at debates, calling it Campbell's book of missed votes. She blasted Campbell for conflicting votes on issues including abortion, corporate tax breaks and gay rights. [Richard] Lamm, who lost the 1992 Democratic primary to Campbell, hired a gymnast named "Flip-horse" in September to perform back hand springs at campaign stops.

Lamm raised $1.64 million for her campaign, which included revenue from fundraisers that she held with Vice President Al Gore and First Lady Hillary Clinton. Campbell raised $2.9 million and received endorsements from former president George H. W. Bush and 1996 Republican presidential nominee Bob Dole. In the November election, Campbell garnered 62 percent of the vote, compared to 35 percent for Lamm. Lamm's primary campaign was mocked by J.T. Colfax, and inmate in the Boulder County Jail, for relying on name recognition in order to run.

== Other activities ==
In 1999 Lamm began teaching at the University of Denver as the 1999/2000 Leo Block Fellow, giving courses on population, leadership, and risk-taking. She then became an adjunct professor in the Community Track at the university's graduate school of social work, giving courses on community organization and political advocacy. She retired from teaching in 2006.

In recent years, Lamm has volunteered in a program for Somali immigrant children, and mentors young women considering careers in politics.

== Affiliations and memberships ==
Lamm is a founder of the Women's Foundation of Colorado, and was the group's first board president. She is also a founder of the Democratic Women's Caucus of Colorado. As of 2014, she was a member of the foundation board of the Rocky Mountain Farmers' Union, and the Capital Campaign Committee for Planned Parenthood of the Rocky Mountains.

== Awards and honors ==
She was inducted into the Colorado Women's Hall of Fame in 1985. The Women's Foundation of Colorado named its annual Dottie Lamm Leadership Award for high school students in her honor. She was awarded the Humanist Heroine Award by the American Humanist Association in 1997. She was the recipient of the 2014 Empathy Award from Volunteers of America.

== Personal life ==
She married Richard Lamm, then a lawyer and accountant, in Denver in 1963. They have a son and daughter. Both she and her husband enjoy scuba diving, skiing, and mountain climbing. She has climbed 35 of the fourteeners in Colorado.

In August 1983 Lamm was diagnosed with breast cancer and underwent a mastectomy. She wrote about her surgery and chemotherapy treatment at length in her newspaper column, encouraging women to go for mammogram screening, and received many letters of support.

== Bibliography ==
- Daddy on Board: Parenting Roles for the 21st Century. Fulcrum Publishing. 2007. ISBN 978-1555916312.
- Dottie Lamm's Choice Concerns, 1980–1986. Johnson Books.
- Second Banana. Johnson Books. 1983. ISBN 093347279X.

== Sources ==
- Varnell, Jeanne (1999). Women of Consequence: The Colorado Women's Hall of Fame. Big Earth Publishing. ISBN 1555662145.

Party political offices
Preceded by Ben Nighthorse Campbell	Democratic nominee for U.S. Senator from Colorado (Class 3); 1998	Succeeded by Ken Salazar
