= Broadway Lofts =

Coordinates: 32°42′57″N 117°09′35″W

Broadway Lofts is the oldest known highrise in San Diego. It is 99 years old.

Preceded by Unknown	Tallest Building in San Diego; 1909–1924; 46 m	Succeeded by John D. Spreckels Building
