= USS Mesa Verde =

US Navy amphibious transport ship

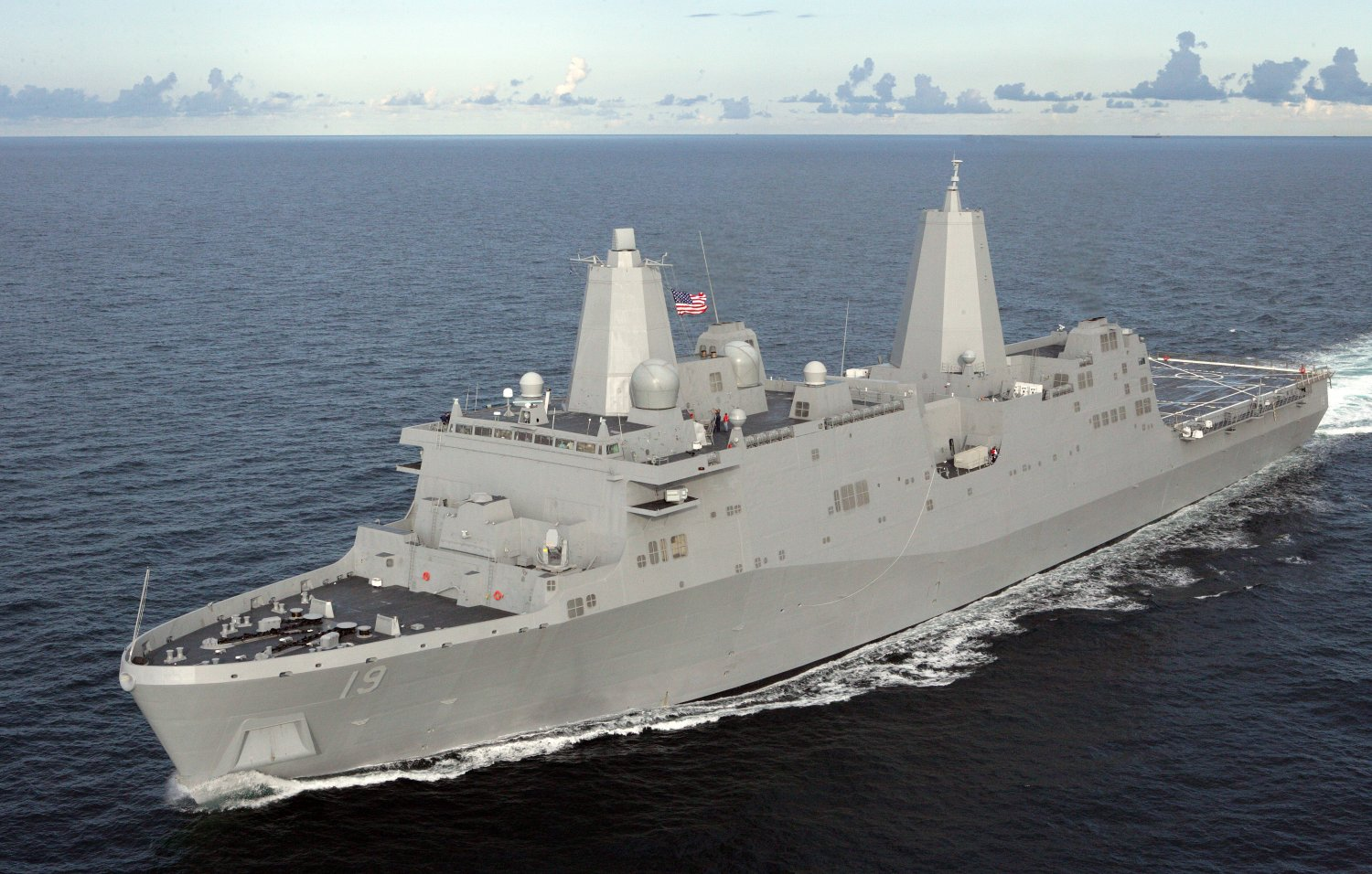
- USS Mesa Verde in December 2007

History

United States
- Name: Mesa Verde
- Namesake: Mesa Verde
- Awarded: 29 February 2000
- Builder: Northrop Grumman Ship Systems
- Laid down: 25 February 2003
- Launched: 19 November 2004
- Christened: 15 January 2005
- Commissioned: 15 December 2007
- Home port: Norfolk
- Identification: MMSI number: 369970397; Callsign: NMVD; Pennant number: LPD-19
- Motto: Courage Teamwork Tradition
- Status: in active service
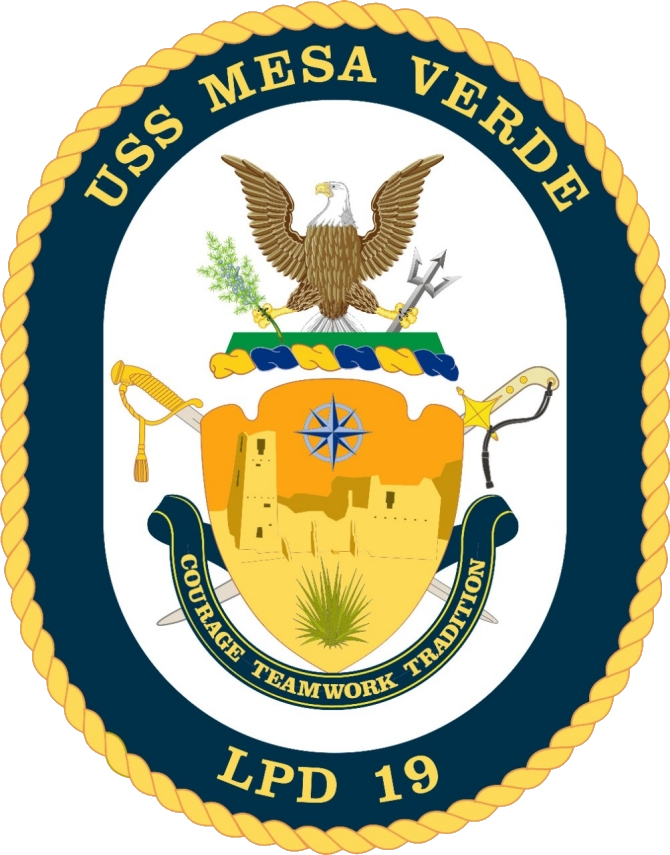
- Badge

General characteristics
- Class & type: San Antonio-class amphibious transport dock
- Displacement: 24,433 tons (full)
- Length: 208.4 meters (684 ft) overall, 201.4 meters (661 ft) waterline
- Beam: 32 meters (105 ft) extreme, 29.5 meters (97 ft) waterline
- Draft: 7 meters (23 ft)
- Propulsion: Four Colt-Pielstick diesel engines, two shafts, 40,000 hp (30 MW)
- Speed: 22 knots (41 km/h)
- Boats & landing craft carried: Two LCACs (air cushion) or one LCU (conventional)
- Capacity: 699 (66 officers, 633 enlisted); surge to 800 total.
- Complement: 28 officers, 83 enlisted (including 550 marines)
- Armament: 1 × 16 cell MK 41 VLS (capable, but not currently installed); 2 × RIM-116 RAM launchers for air defense; 2 × 30 mm Bushmaster II cannons, for surface threat defense; 2 × 0.5 in (12.7 mm) machine guns for close protection
- Aircraft carried: Four CH-46 Sea Knight helicopters or two MV-22 tilt rotor aircraft may be launched or recovered simultaneously.

USS Mesa Verde (LPD-19) is the third San Antonio-class amphibious transport dock of the United States Navy. She is the first U.S. Navy warship to be named after the Mesa Verde National Park in the U.S. state of Colorado.

== History ==
The contract to build Mesa Verde was awarded on 29 February 2000 to Northrop Grumman Ship Systems of Pascagoula, Mississippi, and her keel was laid down on 25 February 2003. She was launched on 19 November 2004, and christened on 15 January 2005 with Linda Price Campbell, wife of former Senator Ben Nighthorse Campbell of Colorado, serving as the ship's sponsor. The ship was commissioned on 15 December 2007 in Panama City, Florida.
