= El Cortez (San Diego) =

Condominium building in San Diego, California

- U.S. National Register of Historic Places
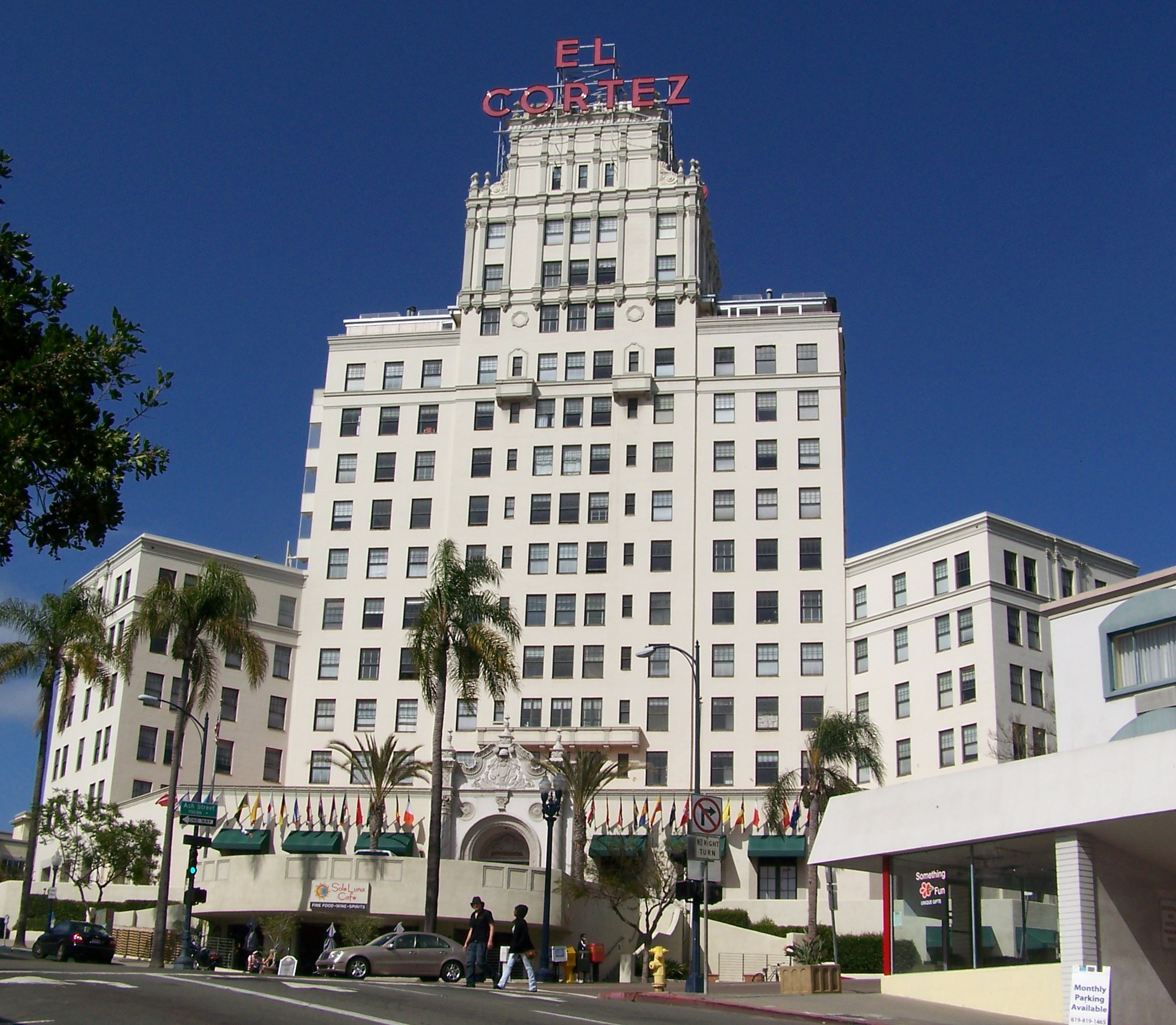
- El Cortez in 2009

- Location within San Diego Location within San Diego County, California Location within California Location within the United States
- Location: San Diego, California
- Coordinates: 32°43′13″N 117°9′29″W
- Built: 1927
- Architect: Walker & Eisen; Simpson, William, Construction Co.
- Architectural style: Mission/Spanish Revival
- NRHP reference No.: 01001458
- Added to NRHP: January 17, 2002

El Cortez is a condominium building in San Diego, California. Built from 1926 to 1927, El Cortez was the tallest building in San Diego when it opened. It sits atop a hill at the north end of downtown San Diego, where it dominated the city skyline for many years and became a landmark hotel. The building is the 40th tallest building in San Diego, based on its height of 310 ft (94 m).

From its opening in 1927 through the 1950s, it was a renowned apartment-hotel in San Diego. The large "El Cortez" sign, which is illuminated at night, was added in 1937 and could be seen for miles. In the 1950s, the world's first outside glass elevator was built at El Cortez. During the late 1960s and 1970s, El Cortez fell on harder times.

El Cortez closed as a hotel in 1978 when it was purchased by evangelist Morris Cerullo to serve as an evangelism school. Cerullo sold the property in 1981, and El Cortez was threatened with demolition until the San Diego Historic Site Board designated it as a historic site in 1990. It was added to the National Register of Historic Places in 2002. Many of the original elements remain in place, though substantial interior modifications have been made.

== Early history (1927–1949) ==
=== Construction and architecture ===
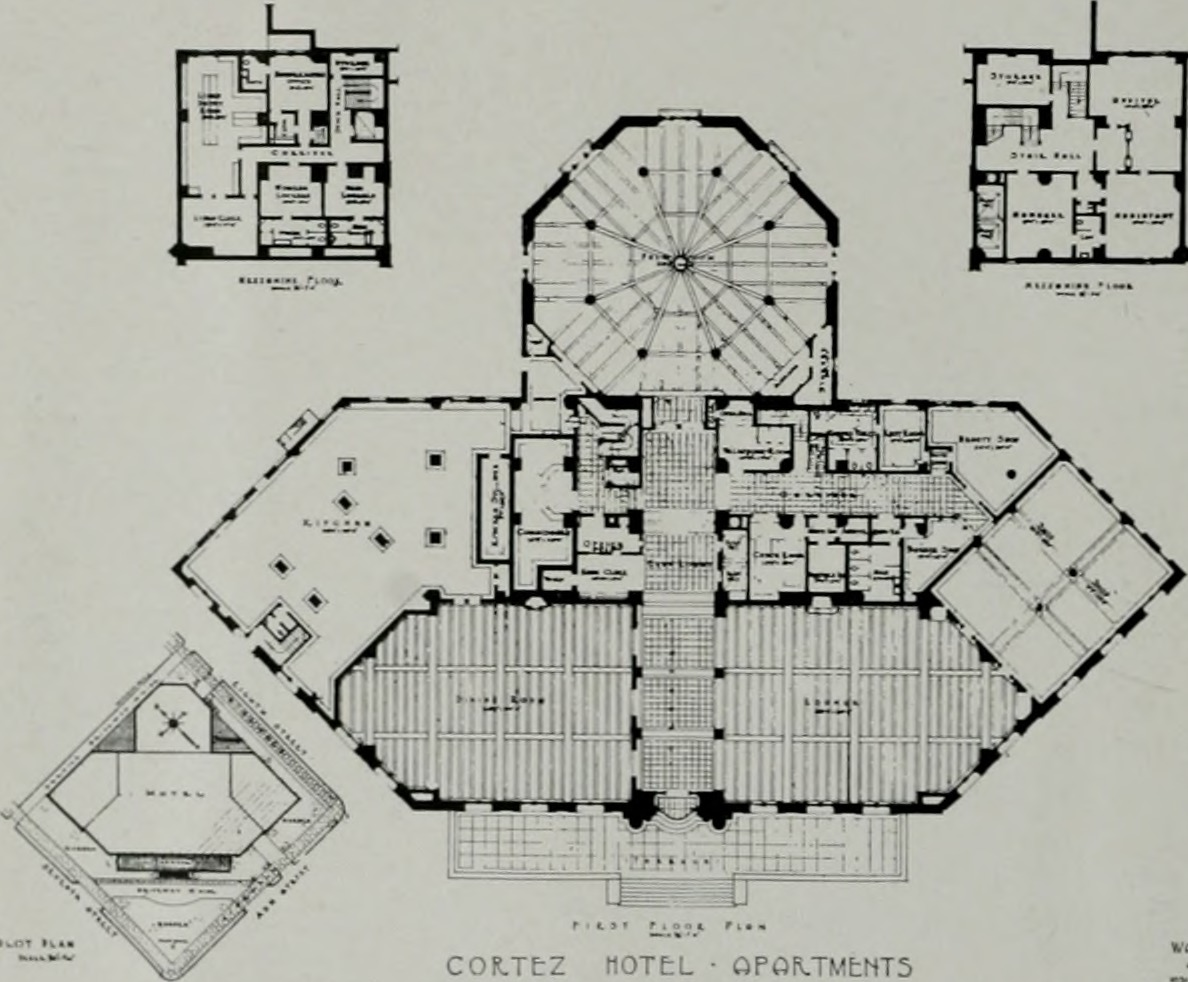
Floor plan of El Cortez Hotel Apartments

Construction of El Cortez began in 1926 and was completed the next year at a cost of $2.5 million. The 14-story hotel was built by Richard T. Robinson, Jr., and designed by architects Albert R. Walker and Percy Eisen in a Spanish Churrigueresque style. The building utilizes the Spanish Colonial Revival architectural style. The hotel was built on the site of Ulysses S. Grant, Jr.'s home, 175 feet (53 m) above sea level. The building is named for the Spanish conquistador Hernán Cortés.

El Cortez Hotel opened on Thanksgiving Day on November 26, 1927. A crowd of 50,000 people were present at the opening—a third of the San Diego population. When the building was first opened, it had 117 rooms, 85 of these used for apartments, and 32 for hotel rooms. At the time of the opening, the Los Angeles Times reported:

"The building is Spanish Renaissance in design. In keeping with the architecture, approach to the building is made through a Spanish garden of flowers, cool green lawns and fountains. Just above the entrance is an open-air garden retreat."

More than sixty years later, the Times noted that El Cortez's "graceful proportions and unique layout, with angular side wings embracing the main entrance, make it especially inviting."

The hotel's main ballroom, the Don Room, was known as one of the most beautiful rooms in the city with an ornately carved sandalwood ceiling supported by large pillars, and an inlaid maple floor. The 200-seat Aztec Dining Room also reflected the hotel's opulence. Critics dubbed it "the outstanding eating rendezvous of the community ... because of its vast windows, brilliant ceiling and handsome equipment." The art deco style Sky Room, added in 1940, became renowned for its glass walls and 360-degree view of the city. At a height of 310 feet (94 m), penthouse guests could see up to 30 miles (48 km) away.

The top of the building includes a red neon sign with the words "El Cortez", which was first added in 1937. The sign was expanded in 1951 and restored in 1999. Each letter is 12 feet (3.6 m) high.

For 36 years, El Cortez was San Diego's tallest building, and its exterior glass elevator, Travolator, and Starlight restaurant made it a San Diego landmark.

=== World War II ===
On December 8, 1941, the day after the attack on Pearl Harbor, an anti-aircraft battery and radar station were installed on the El Cortez roof. The anti-aircraft battery remained atop El Cortez for the duration of the war. One of the soldiers who manned the battery later recalled:

"Since I was the search light battery commander, I would observe the action of the search lights at night. So some times I had to go on the roof of the El Cortez and there was no way of getting up there except through this bar that was on top. It was a beautiful bar. [To] the people sitting at the table, I had to 'excuse me' and there I am in my uniform stepping on their table and getting out the window, walking up the fire escape to the top of the El Cortez to look at the mission."

== Handlery years (1950–1978) ==
=== Harry Handlery ===
In 1951, hotelier Harry Handlery purchased El Cortez from the El Cortez Company for $1.5 million. Handlery reportedly fell in love with the hotel and made it his permanent residence. Handlery made numerous changes both to the interior and exterior in his effort to make it "the finest hotel on the Pacific Coast," promising that "the hammers will never be still as long as I own the Cortez." To attract visitors, Handlery added a swimming pool in 1952, the Caribbean wing (an eight-story addition with a grand ballroom) in 1954, the Starlight Room (located on the twelfth floor and known for its views and chic experience) in 1956, an exterior glass elevator, and a motel and moving sidewalk known as the Travolator in 1959.

=== Glass elevator and Travolator ===
Handlery's most remembered changes were the addition of the world's first outside hydraulic glass elevator and the first moving sidewalk in the 1950s. The outdoor glass elevator, reportedly a bellboy's idea, was "the world's first in 1956." Known as the "Starlight Express," the elevator brought visitors to the hotel's dining facilities with views of the city. The design of El Cortez's outside glass elevator was later copied by the Fairmont Hotel in San Francisco and The Ilikai in Hawaii. Some considered the glass elevator to be one of Handlery's novelties, but it served as an attraction to draw visitors back to the downtown hotel. In 1989, a controversy arose when the owner, San Diego hotelier Mark Grosvenor, proposed a renovation plan that omitted the glass elevator. Grosvenor announced plans to remove some of the non-original elements, including the glass elevator and rooftop sign and neon stars, leading to a split among preservationists. Grosvenor was concerned about structural problems with the elevator and the unavailability of spare parts. Some preservationists approved of Grosvenor's plan, opining that Handlery's additions were "fifties kitsch" that detracted from the original Spanish architecture. Others regarded the elevator as a key element in the hotel's historic significance. One member of the local historic site board noted, "It was the elevator that made a night at the El Cortez so thrilling. Any restoration that doesn't include the elevator is incomplete." The federal government ultimately endorsed proposals to remove the 1950s alterations and restore the original appearance.

Handerly also built the Travolator bridge in 1959 to connect El Cortez with his new motel across the street. Designed by architect Clarence J. Paderewski for the Otis Elevator Company, the Travolator was essentially a flat escalator. The same design was later used at airports in London, Atlanta and Los Angeles. Some objected to the Travolator's garish orange exterior, but in its early years, San Diego's elite used the moving walkway to attend events at El Cortez. The Travolator ceased operating in 1981 and San Diego's homeless started sleeping on the bridge. In 1986, the owners sold the motel for $4.5 million, and there was no longer a need for a connecting bridge between the two properties. Accordingly, the Travolator bridge was demolished in June 1986.

=== Paul Handlery ===
In 1965, Harry Handlery died of a heart attack. His younger son, Paul Handlery, took over management of the hotel. Some contend that the transition from father to son signaled the decline of El Cortez as a center of the downtown social world. Harry Handlery had frequently made rounds throughout the hotel checking on every detail of service and quality. Some employees complained that Paul Handlery did not spend enough money for renovations and repairs on the hotel.

=== Pueblo incident ===
During the 1968 Pueblo incident, family members of the Pueblo crew were lodged at El Cortez.

== Cerullo's evangelism center (1978–1981) ==
In 1978, Paul Handlery sold El Cortez to evangelist and faith healer Morris Cerullo for $7.5 million. Cerullo converted the hotel into a school of evangelism and a headquarters for Morris Cerullo World Evangelism, Inc. Cerullo sponsored an hour-long television special to raise money to purchase El Cortez. Facing the prospect of layoffs if the acquisition went through, a veteran front desk clerk who watched Cerullo's television special offered these comments: "The second time he (Cerullo) said the Lord spoke to him and told him to buy 'that beautiful old hotel,' the lord spoke to me too. And the Lord told me to turn that guy off. So I switched the channel."

Upon taking over the hotel, Cerullo reportedly spent $4 million to convert the hotel into his evangelism center. The work included gutting the major meeting rooms, including the International Room, Cotillion Room, Starlight Room, Caribbean Room and kitchen. The living quarters were converted into dormitory-style accommodations, and the hotel's luxury furnishings were sold. During the time he owned the building, Cerullo became involved in several disputes with contractors, students, real estate brokers and labor unions. He was also criticized for installing individual air conditioning units that altered the hotel's exterior and ripping out the ornate interiors to accommodate cafeterias rather than fine dining.

In the end, Cerullo needed only half of the hotel's 550 rooms to house students of his three-month $1,400 evangelism school. The balance of the rooms were kept open for public use. Cerullo also made an attempt at reopening the Don Room, without liquor, but it was closed after a short time.

In early 1981, after a little more than two years after acquiring El Cortez, Cerullo put the hotel back on the market for $20.8 million. The building was resold again several times to various owners in the 1980s and 1990s.

== Later years ==
=== Considine years and convention center proposal ===
El Cortez Associates, led by Denver developer Terry Considine, bought the property and proposed the site in 1983 as a location for the planned San Diego Convention Center. However, the city ultimately chose to build the convention center on the bayfront. After the convention center plan was rejected, proposals were made to restore El Cortez using funds from city-backed bonds or with the help of historic preservation tax credits. Those proposals were not executed, and Considine put the property on the market in 1986. At the time, the hotel's furnishings had been stripped and auctioned by Cerullo, and El Cortez's 250 guest rooms were empty. Considine subsequently sold the landmark to the Grosvenor family. In 1984 and 1985 a community theater, Tom Rusch Productions, operated out of the Don Room. Productions included Godspell and Pirates of Penzance.

=== Preservation efforts ===
After a decade of decline, the Los Angeles Times reported in 1989 as follows:

"Once the crown jewel of downtown San Diego, the 61-year-old El Cortez Hotel has been mostly empty and off-limits to the public for nearly a decade. The neon stars on the western face no longer shine. ... Its hand-carved wooden doors, well-worn bar stools and polished brass fixtures have been auctioned off. Starting with its purchase in 1978 by Morris Cerullo, the El Cortez began a slippery slide to its current sad state."

In 1989, Grosvenor sold the hotel to Minami Corp. of Japan. Grosvenor remained involved as the developer and announced plans to renovate El Cortez as the centerpiece of a $250 million project that would include four new mixed-use towers, 362 residential units and 400 hotels rooms. However, in 1990, Minami lost interest in the ambitious project and announced that it was instead considering demolishing the hotel. Preservationists stepped in and succeeded in having El Cortez declared a San Diego historic site in 1990. In the late 1990s, the new owners embraced the building's historic designation and successfully had it listed on the National Register of Historic Places in order to qualify for renovation tax credits.

=== Redevelopment into condominiums ===
By the late 1990s, El Cortez had become an eyesore. In 1999, developers Peter Janopaul and Anthony Block obtained a loan from San Diego's redevelopment agency to renovate the building, including restoration of some historic elements. Initially, the developers leased the restored units as luxury apartments, but in 2004, they converted the building to condominiums. They divided the building into 85 residential condominium units along with commercial and office space, and the restored Don Room.

By 2007, maintenance problems, including bursting pipes and backed-up plumbing, and declining values resulted in contentious litigation between the condominium homeowners and the developers. Several units were repossessed by lenders and were listed at prices less than half their original purchase prices. The homeowners sought $13 million in damages for construction defects, underfunding of the homeowners association reserves, and the developers’ plans to build another tower next door.

=== Intellectual property ===
In order to protect the name and image of El Cortez, the El Cortez Owners Association obtained the federal trademark rights to the El Cortez name and image from the United States Patent and Trademark Office under registration number 3422531. The trademark was cancelled in 2018. They also obtained the same state protection from the Secretary of State of California under registration number 64167.

== Impact ==
Guests who have visited the hotel include U.S. Presidents Dwight D. Eisenhower, Lyndon B. Johnson, and Gerald Ford, and singers Bing Crosby, Elvis Presley, and Roy Rogers, actress Jane Wyatt, bandleader Skitch Henderson, and comedian Groucho Marx The hotel was featured in the 1963 film A Ticklish Affair.

On July 25, 1990, the City of San Diego's Historic Site Board declared the building to be "historic", thus preventing its demolition. As a result of the designation, the building's interior was refurbished for modern apartments. El Cortez Hotel was eventually added to the National Register of Historic Places on January 17, 2002, for its impact on architecture and engineering.
