= Alan Casden =

American businessman

Alan I. Casden
- Born: 1945 (age 80–81)
- Citizenship: United States
- Education: University of Southern California (BA) (MBA)
- Occupation: Real estate developer
- Known for: Founder of Casden Properties, LLC
- Spouse: Susan Dedmon Casden
- Children: 5

Alan I. Casden (born 1945) is an American real estate developer, investor and philanthropist. His real estate companies have developed over 90,000 multi-family apartments since the 1980s. He also owns 3,100 luxury apartments in Los Angeles.

== Early life and education ==
Casden was raised in a Jewish family, the son of a liquor wholesaler. He was bar mitzvahed at the Wilshire Boulevard Temple where he remains a member today. Casden began his academic career as history major, but he was drawn into finance and accounting classes and eventually switched his educational focus to accounting. Casden enrolled at the University of Southern California as a sophomore after his freshman year at UCLA and graduated cum laude from USC's Leventhal School of Accounting in 1968, earning a Bachelor of Science and a Masters in Business Administration from USC.

== Career ==
After earning his degree, Casden took a position with Kenneth Leventhal & Company at the urging of one of his professors. During this period, Kenneth Leventhal became the major accounting firm for large U.S. residential real estate developers, which exposed Casden to a variety of major real estate entities that eventually became his clients. Casden excelled during his time with Kenneth Leventhal, founding the company's San Francisco office in 1969. In 1975, Casden accepted a job with Los Angeles apartment developer Robert Mayer and with financial support from the Belzberg family of Canada, he was able to take control of the firm. In 1980, he bought out the Belzberg interest after a dispute regarding future strategic directions the renamed Casden Properties, LLC, based in Beverly Hills. Using obscure incentives and deductions in the United States Tax Code, Casden was to profitably develop low-income housing projects and within a few years, Casdan properties had become one of the largest multi-family developers in the United States, winning 30 major design awards and earning recognition from the New York Times as an example of the use of urban planning to prevent urban sprawl. In 2002, Casden sold the majority of his real estate portfolio to the Denver real estate investment trust (REIT), Apartment Investment & Management Company (AIMCO) for $1.1 billion in cash, AIMCO stock, and assumed debt.

== Philanthropy ==
Casden is a noted Jewish philanthropist and gave $10.6 million to USC to benefit the Institute for the Study of the Jewish Role in American Life, endow a dean's chair at the Leventhal School and create the Casden Real Estate Economics Forecast within the USC Lusk Center for Real Estate. He is on the USC Board of Trustees.

Additionally, President George W. Bush appointed Casden to serve on the Honorary Delegation to accompany him to Jerusalem for the celebration of the 60th anniversary of the State of Israel in May 2008. In his final days as president, Bush appointed Casden to a five-year term on the U.S. Holocaust Memorial Council, which ended on January 15, 2011. The Memorial council helps oversee and run the United States Holocaust Memorial Museum

Casden is a loyal backer of Jewish causes, including Simon Wiesenthal Center's Museum of Tolerance. Casden also serves on the board of Yeshiva University in Los Angeles and was named a "friend of Jerusalem" for his service with the International committee of the Jerusalem 3000 celebration.

Casden has also received awards and appointed to honor his support of his local community, academic institutions, and real estate industry. Casden was awarded the Los Angeles County Leadership Award and Los Angeles Beautification Award, and serves on the Marshall School of Business board of advisors, Leventhal School of Accounting board of advisors and the advisory council of the Lusk Center for Real Estate.

== Professional organizations ==
Casden is a member of the American Institute of Certified Public Accountants, California Society of Certified Public Accountants, a member of the advisory board of the National Multi-Family Housing Conference, Multi-Family Housing Council, President's Council of the California Building Industry Association and Urban Land Institute.

== Personal life ==
Casden is married to Susan Dedmon Casden and has five children. He lives in Beverly Hills, California.
