= Martha Ezzard =

American politician

Martha McElveen Ezzard (November 8, 1938 – October 29, 2023) was a member of the Colorado General Assembly serving in the Colorado House of Representatives from 1979 to 1981 and the Colorado Senate from 1981 to 1987. She was a Republican up until 1987, when she became a Democrat.

== Early life and career ==
Ezzard was born November 8, 1938, in Atlanta, Georgia. She earned a bachelor's degree from the University of Georgia and a master's from the University of Missouri. Prior to her time in the General Assembly, she worked as a press assistant for Governor John Arthur Love.

== Colorado General Assembly ==
In the 1978 election, incumbent Betty Ann Dittemore opted to run for Lieutenant Governor of Colorado rather than run for reelection to the House. Ezzard was elected to the Colorado House of Representatives in 1978 to succeed her in the 37th district. Ezzard served a single term before being elected to the Colorado Senate in 1980. In 1987, Ezzard switched from the Republican Party to the Democratic Party. After her party switch, she resigned from the Senate and was succeeded by her 1986 primary opponent Terry Considine. While a member of the General Assembly, she earned her law degree from the University of Denver College of Law.

== Runs for higher office ==
In the 1986 election, Ezzard ran in the Republican primary for the United States Senate seat being vacated by Gary Hart. She and Terry Considine were defeated in the primary by Congressman Ken Kramer. In 1988, Ezzard challenged Congressman Daniel Schaefer as a Democrat in Colorado's 6th congressional district. Schaefer defeated Ezzard by a two-to-one margin in the heavily Republican district.

== Post-political career ==
In 1989, Governor Roy Romer appointed Ezzard to the Small Business Council, a thirty-two member advisory council to the Governor and Office of Economic Development. After her time in the legislature, she moved to Georgia and operated a winery.

== Death ==
Ezzard died at her home in Tiger, Georgia on October 29, 2023. She was 84.
