= 1998 United States Senate election in Colorado =

- November 3, 1998
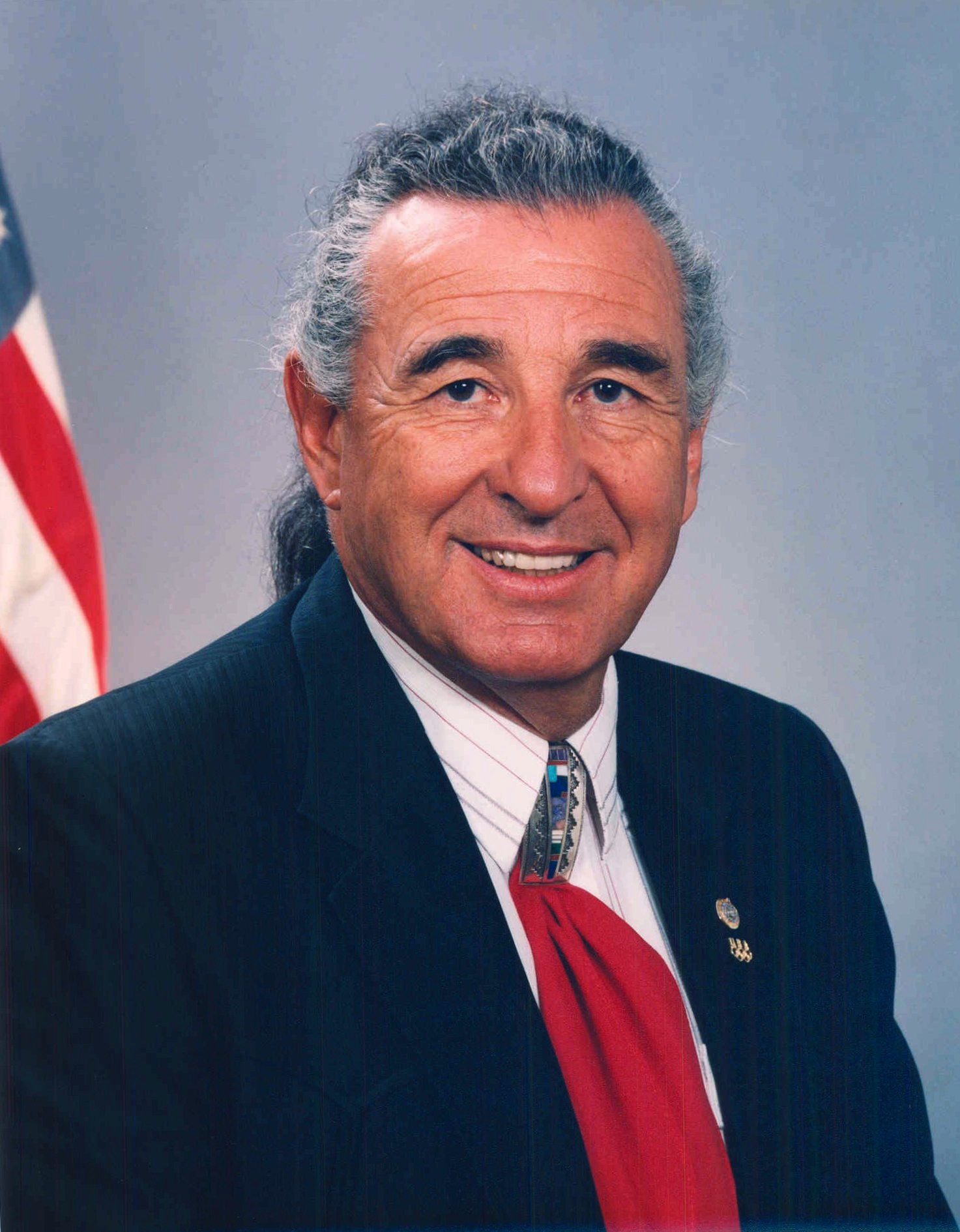

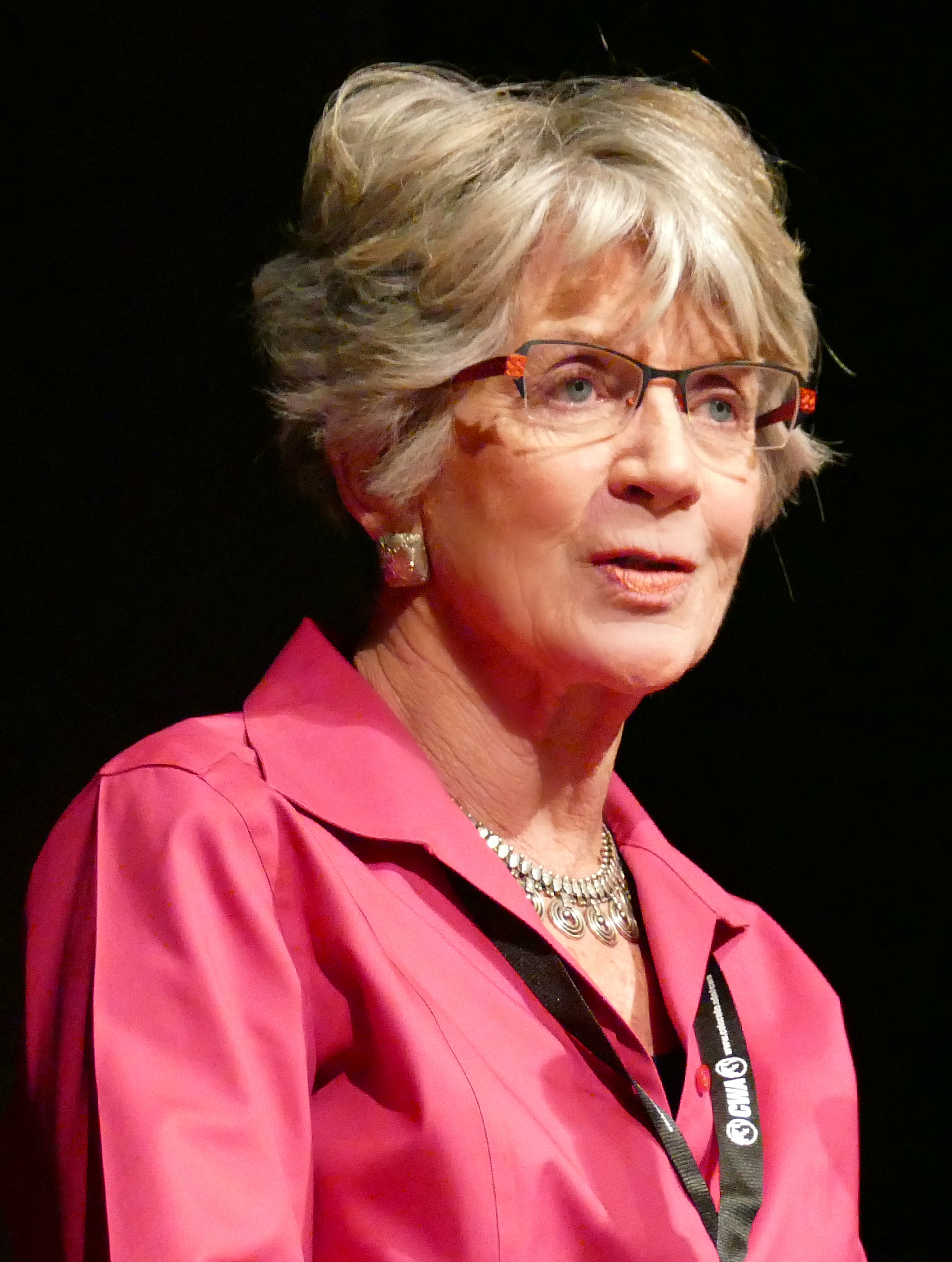
Nominee	Ben Nighthorse Campbell	Dottie Lamm
Party	Republican	Democratic
Popular vote	829,370	464,754
Percentage	62.49%	35.02%
- County results Nighthorse Campbell: 50–60% 60–70% 70–80% 80–90% Lamm: 50–60%
U.S. senator before election
Ben Nighthorse Campbell
Republican
Elected U.S. Senator
Ben Nighthorse Campbell
Republican

The 1998 United States Senate election in Colorado was held November 3, 1998. Republican incumbent Ben Nighthorse Campbell won re-election to a second term by a landslide over former Colorado first lady Dottie Lamm.

As of 2026, this is the only time since 1968 that a Republican won the Class 3 Senate seat in Colorado, and the last time that a Native American was elected to the United States Senate until 2022.

== Background ==
Ben Nighthorse Campbell, who was elected in 1992 on the Democratic ticket, switched parties after the "Republican Revolution" in the 1994 United States elections.

== Democratic primary ==
=== Candidates ===
- Dottie Lamm, former Colorado first lady
- Gil Romero, former state legislator

=== Results ===
Democratic primary results
Party	Candidate	Votes	%
Democratic	Dottie Lamm	84,929	57.98%
Democratic	Gil Romero	61,548	42.02%
Total votes		146,477	100.00%

== Republican primary ==
=== Candidates ===
- Ben Nighthorse Campbell, incumbent U.S. senator since 1993
- Bill Eggert, 1994 candidate for U.S. House

=== Results ===
Republican primary results
Party	Candidate	Votes	%
Republican	Ben Nighthorse Campbell (inc.)	154,702	70.62%
Republican	Bill Eggert	64,347	29.38%
Total votes		219,049	100.00%

== General election ==
=== Candidates ===
- Ben Nighthorse Campbell, incumbent U.S. senator sine 1993 (Republican)
- John Heckman (Independent)
- Dottie Lamm, former Colorado first lady (Democratic)
- Jeffrey Peckman, entrepreneur and Transcendental Meditation advocate (Natural Law)
- David S. Segal (Libertarian)
- Gary Swing (Independent)
- Kevin Swanson, Covenant Presbyterian minister from Elizabeth (Constitution)

=== Campaign ===
In the general election, Lamm criticized Campbell for "flip-flopping" from being a moderate liberal to moderate conservative. Throughout the entire campaign, Lamm mostly sent out negative attack advertisements about Campbell.

=== Polling ===
Poll source	Date(s) administered	Sample size (Note: Key: A – all adults RV – registered voters LV – likely voters V – unclear)	Margin of error	Ben Nighthorse Campbell (R)	Dottie Lamm (D)	Undecided
Mason-Dixon Polling & Strategy	October 26–28, 1998	831 (LV)	± 3.5%	58%	32%	10%
Ciruli Associates	October 25, 1998	400	—	60%	31%	9%
Ciruli Associates	October 21, 1998	400	—	61%	30%	9%
Harris Insights & Analytics	October 20, 1998	614	—	55%	37%	8%
Mason-Dixon Polling & Strategy	October 9–12, 1998	804 (LV)	± 3.5%	50%	37%	13%
Ciruli Associates (Note: Poll sponsored by 9News, KOA Radio, and The Denver Post)	October 1–10, 1998	407 (LV)	± 5.0%	54%	33%	13%
Mason-Dixon Polling & Strategy	July 27–29, 1998	849 (LV)	± 3.5%	46%	34%	20%

=== Results ===
General election
Party	Candidate	Votes	%	±%
Republican	Ben Nighthorse Campbell (inc.)	829,370	62.49%	+19.78%
Democratic	Dottie Lamm	464,754	35.02%	−16.76%
Libertarian	David S. Segal	14,024	1.06%	+1.06%
Constitution	Kevin Swanson	9,775	0.74%	
Natural Law	Jeffrey Peckham	4,101	0.31%	
Independent	John Heckman	3,230	0.24%	
Independent	Gary Swing	1,981	0.15%	
Majority		364,616	27.47%	+18.40%
Turnout		1,327,235		
Republican hold		Swing		

== See also ==
- 1998 United States Senate elections

== Notes ==
Partisan clients
