= Murkowski =

Murkowski (Polish pronunciation: [murˈkɔfskʲi] often Anglicised to /mɜːrˈkaʊski/; feminine: Murkowska, plural: Murkowscy) is a surname of Polish language origin. Notable people with the surname include:

- Frank Murkowski (born 1933), U.S. politician, Senator (1981–2002) and Governor of Alaska (2002–2006), father of Lisa Murkowski
- Lisa Murkowski (born 1957), incumbent Senator from Alaska (since 2002), daughter of Frank Murkowski
