= Glenn Olds =

American politician

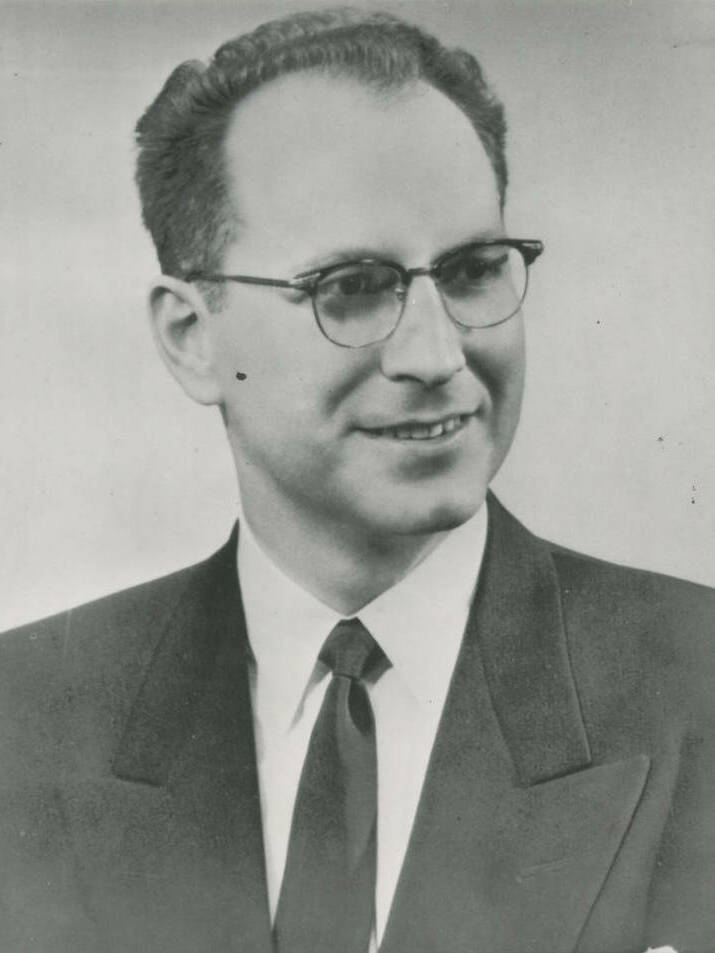
- Portrait of Olds in 1958

Personal details
- Born: February 28, 1921 Sherwood, Oregon, U.S.
- Died: March 11, 2006 (aged 85) Sherwood, Oregon, U.S.
- Party: Democratic
- Education: Willamette University (BA); Garrett-Evangelical Theological Seminary (BDiv); Northwestern University (MA); Yale University (PhD)

Glenn A. Olds (February 28, 1921 – March 11, 2006) was an American academic administrator, government official and politician. Olds was raised in Oregon and attended Willamette University. Olds served as the president of Springfield College in western Massachusetts from 1958 to 1965, of Kent State University in Ohio from 1971 to 1977, and of Alaska Pacific University from 1977 to 1988. In 1986, he was the Democratic nominee for U.S. Senate from the state of Alaska, which he lost to incumbent Frank Murkowski. He also served as commissioner of the Alaska Department of Commerce and Economic Development during the second governorship of Walter Hickel in the early 1990s.

== Electoral history ==
- United States Senate election in Alaska, 1986

=== Blanket primary results ===
Blanket primary results
Party	Candidate	Votes	%
Republican	Frank Murkowski	91,705	63.11
Democratic	Glenn Olds	36,995	25.46
Democratic	Bill Barnes	4,871	3.35
Libertarian	Chuck House	4,265	2.94
Democratic	Dave J. Carlson	4,211	2.90
Democratic	Michael J. Bruner	1,809	1.24
Democratic	Karl Francis	1,454	1.00
Total votes		145,310	100.00

=== General election results ===
United States Senate election in Alaska, 1986
Party	Candidate	Votes	%	±%
Republican	Frank Murkowski	97,674	54.02%	+0.34%
Democratic	Glenn Olds	79,727	44.10%	−1.84%
Libertarian	Chuck House	3,161	1.75%	
Write-ins		239	0.13%	
Majority		17,947	9.93%	+2.17%
Turnout		180,801		
Republican hold		Swing		

Party political offices
Preceded by Clark Gruening	Democratic nominee for U.S. Senator from Alaska (Class 3); 1986	Succeeded by Tony Smith
