= 1992 United States Senate election in Alaska =

- November 3, 1992
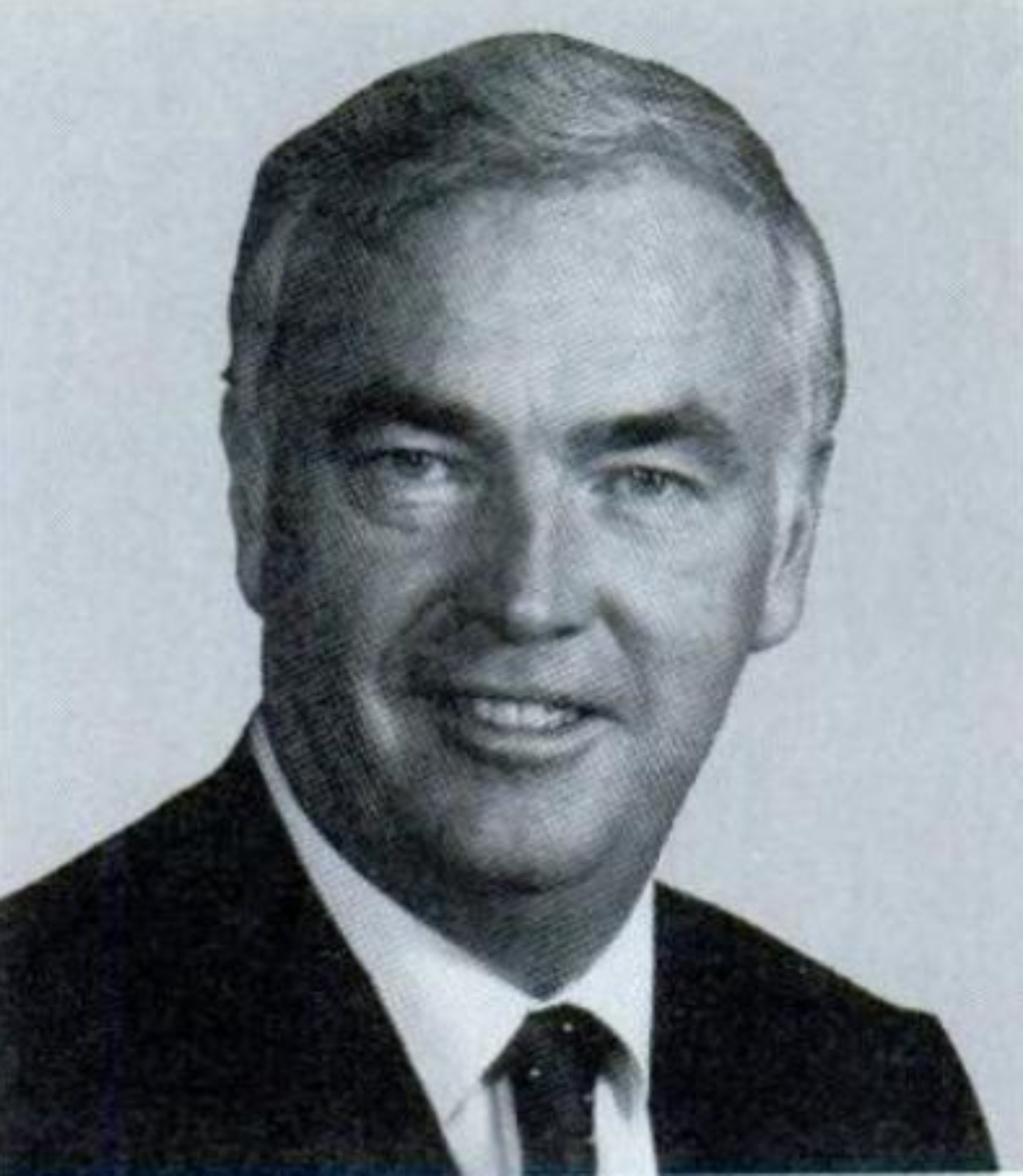

Nominee	Frank Murkowski	Tony Smith	Mary Jordan
Party	Republican	Democratic	Green
Popular vote	127,163	92,065	20,019
Percentage	53.05%	38.41%	8.35%
- Results by state house district Murkowski: 40–50% 50–60% Smith: 40–50% 50–60%
U.S. senator before election
Frank Murkowski
Republican
Elected U.S. Senator
Frank Murkowski
Republican

The 1992 United States Senate election in Alaska was held on November 3, 1992. Incumbent Republican United States Senator Frank Murkowski sought re-election to a third term in the United States Senate. Tony Smith, the Democratic nominee and a former Commissioner of Economic Development, won his party's nomination in a crowded primary and faced off against Murkowski in the general election. Though Murkowski was held to a lower vote percentage than he received six years prior, he was ultimately re-elected.

== Open primary ==
=== Candidates ===
==== Democratic ====
- Tony Smith, former Alaska Commissioner of Economic Development
- William L. Hensley, former Alaska State Senator
- Michael Beasley, perennial candidate
- Joseph A. Sonneman, perennial candidate
- Frank Vondersaar, perennial candidate

==== Green ====
- Mary Jordan

=== Results ===
Open primary results
Party	Candidate	Votes	%
Democratic	Tony Smith	33,162	44.81%
Democratic	William L. Hensley	29,586	39.98%
Green	Mary Jordan	5,989	8.09%
Democratic	Michael Beasley	2,657	3.59%
Democratic	Joseph Sonneman	1,607	2.17%
Democratic	Frank Vondersaar	1,000	1.35%
Total votes		74,001	100.00%

== Republican primary ==
=== Candidates ===
- Frank Murkowski, incumbent United States Senator since 1981
- Jed Whittaker, commercial fisherman

=== Results ===
Republican primary results
Party	Candidate	Votes	%
Republican	Frank Murkowski (Incumbent)	37,486	80.53%
Republican	Jed Whittaker	9,065	19.47%
Total votes		46,551	100.00%

== General election ==
=== Results ===
1992 United States Senate election in Alaska
Party	Candidate	Votes	%	±%
Republican	Frank Murkowski (Incumbent)	127,163	53.05%	−0.98%
Democratic	Tony Smith	92,065	38.41%	−5.69%
Green	Mary Jordan	20,019	8.35%	
Write-ins		467	0.19%	
Majority		35,098	14.64%	+4.72%
Turnout		239,714		
Republican hold		Swing		

== See also ==
- 1992 United States Senate elections
