= 1986 United States Senate election in Alaska =

- November 4, 1986
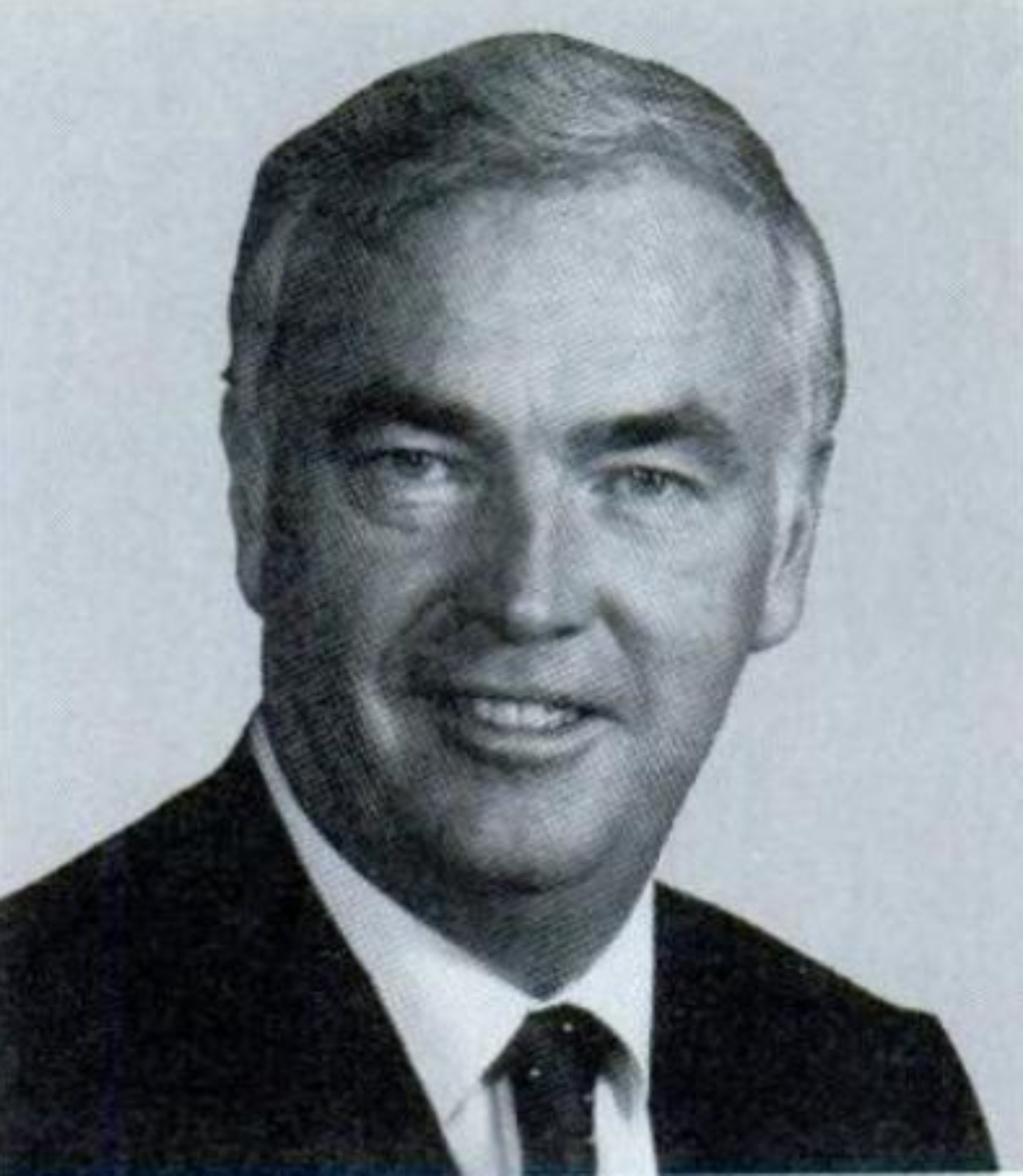

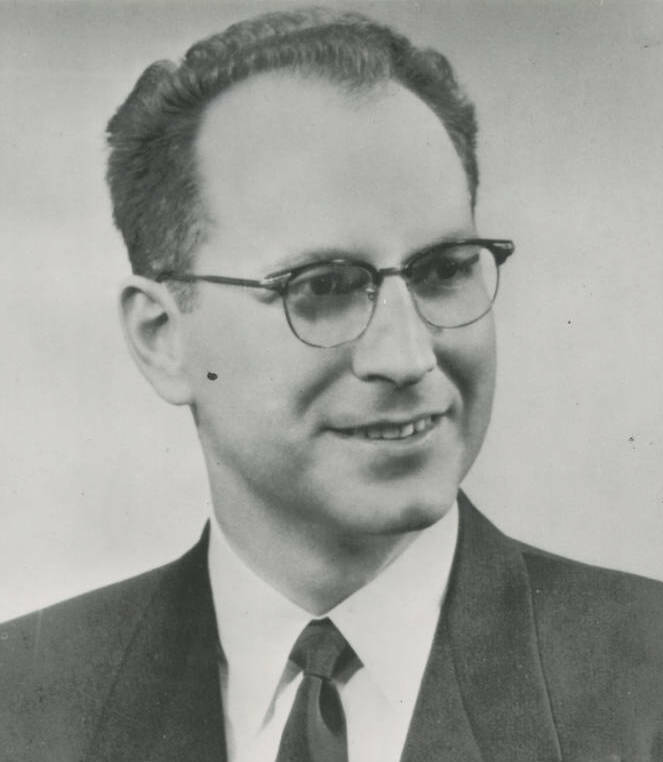
Nominee	Frank Murkowski	Glenn Olds
Party	Republican	Democratic
Popular vote	97,764	79,727
Percentage	54.02%	44.10%
- Results by state house district Murkowski: 40–50% 50–60% 60–70% Olds: 40–50% 50–60%
U.S. senator before election
Frank Murkowski
Republican
Elected U.S. Senator
Frank Murkowski
Republican

The 1986 United States Senate election in Alaska was held on November 4, 1986. Incumbent Republican United States Senator Frank Murkowski ran for a second term in the United States Senate and was primarily opposed by Alaska Pacific University President Glenn Olds. Following a highly competitive election in 1980, Murkowski faced a legitimate opponent in Glenn Olds, and the contest was fairly close. However, in the end, Murkowski was able to defeat Olds by a slightly wider margin than he won by six years prior.

== Open primary ==
=== Candidates ===
==== Republican ====
- Frank Murkowski, incumbent United States Senator since 1981, former banker and commissioner of the Alaska Department of Economic Development

==== Democratic ====
- Glenn Olds, president of Alaska Pacific University
- Bill Barnes, former director of the People Mover transit system in Anchorage. His wife, Allegra, was the Libertarian nominee for lieutenant governor in this same election year
- Dave Carlson, former congressional candidate
- Michael J. Bruner
- Karl Francis

==== Libertarian ====
- Chuck House, field representative for Eastman Kodak Company and Libertarian Party activist

=== Results ===
Open primary results
Party	Candidate	Votes	%
Republican	Frank Murkowski (inc.)	91,705	63.11%
Democratic	Glenn Olds	36,995	25.46%
Democratic	Bill Barnes	4,871	3.35%
Libertarian	Chuck House	4,265	2.94%
Democratic	Dave J. Carlson	4,211	2.90%
Democratic	Michael J. Bruner	1,809	1.24%
Democratic	Karl Francis	1,454	1.00%
Total votes		145,310	100.00%

== General election ==
=== Results ===
1986 United States Senate election in Alaska
Party	Candidate	Votes	%	±%
Republican	Frank Murkowski (inc.)	97,674	54.02%	+0.34%
Democratic	Glenn Olds	79,727	44.10%	−1.84%
Libertarian	Chuck House	3,161	1.75%	
Write-ins		239	0.13%	
Majority		17,947	9.93%	+2.17%
Turnout		180,801		
Republican hold		Swing		

== See also ==
- 1986 United States Senate elections
