= 1998 United States Senate election in Alaska =

- November 3, 1998
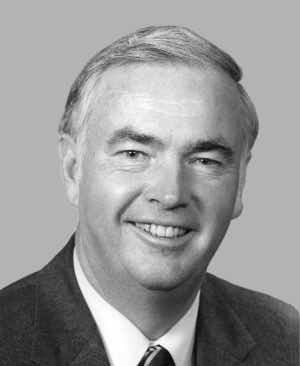

Nominee	Frank Murkowski	Joseph Sonneman
Party	Republican	Democratic
Popular vote	165,227	43,743
Percentage	74.49%	19.72%
- Results by state house district Murkowski: 40–50% 60–70% 70–80% 80–90%
U.S. senator before election
Frank Murkowski
Republican
Elected U.S. Senator
Frank Murkowski
Republican

The 1998 United States Senate election in Alaska was held November 3, 1998. Incumbent Republican United States Senator Frank Murkowski sought re-election to a fourth term in the United States Senate. Murkowski easily won re-election against Democratic nominee Joseph Sonneman, a perennial candidate, earning nearly 75% of the vote.

This is the last time any one won this seat with a majority of the vote in the first round. As of 2023, this is the last time a male or a man was elected to the United States Senate from Alaska for the Class 3 Senate seat.

== Open primary ==
=== Candidates ===
==== Democratic ====
- Joseph Sonneman, perennial candidate
- Frank Vondersaar, perennial candidate

==== Republican ====
- Frank Murkowski, incumbent United States Senator since 1981
- William L. Hale

==== Green ====
- Mary Jordan

==== Libertarian ====
- Scott A. Kohlhaas, perennial candidate

=== Results ===
Open primary results
Party	Candidate	Votes	%
Republican	Frank Murkowski (incumbent)	76,649	71.76%
Democratic	Joseph Sonneman	10,721	10.04%
Democratic	Frank Vondersaar	6,342	5.94%
Republican	William L. Hale	6,313	5.91%
Green	Jeffrey Gottlieb	4,796	4.49%
Libertarian	Scott A. Kohlhaas	1,987	1.86%
Total votes		106,808	100.00%

== General election ==
=== Results ===
1998 United States Senate election in Alaska
Party	Candidate	Votes	%	±%
Republican	Frank Murkowski (incumbent)	165,227	74.49%	+21.44%
Democratic	Joe Sonneman	43,743	19.72%	−18.68%
Green	Jeffrey Gottlieb	7,126	3.21%	−5.14%
Libertarian	Scott A. Kohlhaas	5,046	2.27%	
Write-ins		665	0.30%	
Majority		121,484	54.77%	+40.13%
Turnout		221,807		
Republican hold		Swing		

== See also ==
- 1998 United States Senate elections
