= John Binkley =

American politician

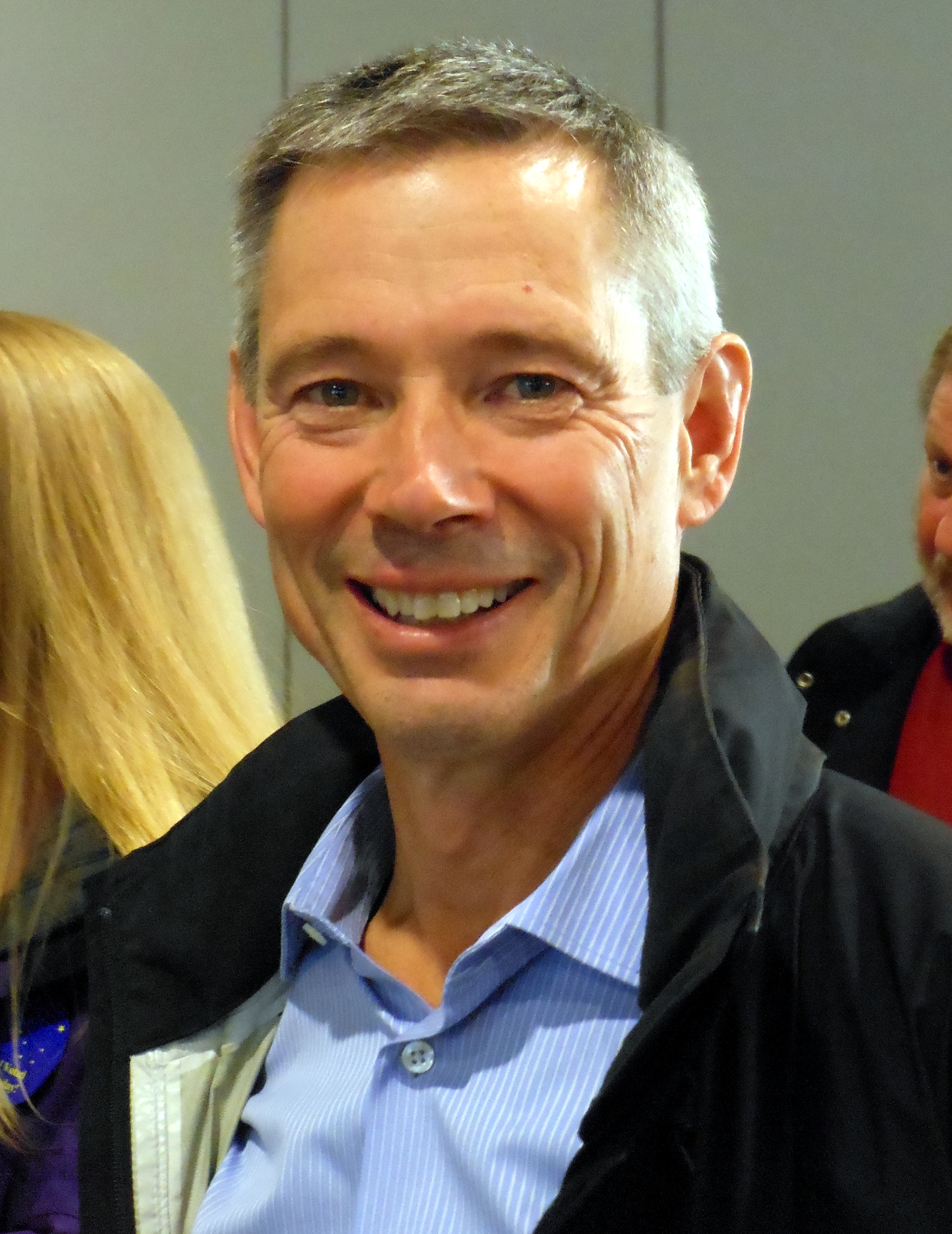
- Binkley in 2012

Alaska State Senator for District M
- In office 1987 – January 21, 1991
- Preceded by: John C. Sackett
- Succeeded by: Lyman Hoffman

Member of the Alaska House of Representatives from the 25th district
- In office 1985 – January 19, 1987
- Preceded by: Anthony N. Vaska
- Succeeded by: Lyman Hoffman

Personal details
- Born: John Emerson Binkley; 4 February 1953 (age 73) Fairbanks, Territory of Alaska
- Party: Republican
- Spouse: Judy Gray Binkley
- Children: 4
- Education: Western Michigan University University of Alaska Fairbanks
- Committees: Senate Finance Committee; Conference Committee on Budget; Committee on Military & Veterans Affairs; Sub-Committee on Commerce; Special Senate Committee on High Seas Salmon Interception

John Emerson "Johne" Binkley (born February 4, 1953, in Fairbanks, Alaska) is a riverboat pilot, businessman and Republican politician from the U.S. state of Alaska. Binkley served for one term in the Alaska House of Representatives and the Alaska Senate during the mid and late 1980s, before running for governor of Alaska in the 2006 primary election. He finished behind Sarah Palin, but ahead of one-term incumbent governor Frank Murkowski.

In 2017, the Anchorage Daily News was acquired by Binkley Co., a group run by John's son, Ryan Binkley.

Binkley was elected chair of the non-partisan Alaska Redistricting Board in 2020, following his appointment to the five-member board by Senate President Cathy Giessel.

== Biography ==
John Emerson Binkley was born on February 4, 1953, in Fairbanks, Alaska, the youngest of three sons and third of four children born to Mary (née Hall) and Charles Madison Binkley, Jr., better known as Jim Binkley. A graduate of Lathrop High School, Binkley attended Western Michigan University before returning to Bethel, Alaska to start a river freight business. In 1982, Binkley was elected to the Bethel City Council, where he served for four years. He sold the business and, in 1991, was named Chairman and Chief Executive Officer of Riverboat Discovery, a successful tour company. From 1993, he additionally served as president of the El Dorado Gold Mine, a tourist attraction.

In 1985, Binkley was elected to district 25 of the Alaska Legislature, where he served on the finance and fisheries committees. In 1986, he was elected to the Alaska State Senate, district M, where he served until 1990. During that time, he was named to several committee posts, including the Senate Finance Committee (1986–1990); Conference Committee on Budget (1988–1990); Committee on Military & Veterans Affairs (1986–1990); Sub-Committee on Commerce (1986–1990); and the Special Senate Committee on High Seas Salmon Interception. In Alaska, legislators are considered part-time, and many do not typically cease outside employment.

In 2005, Binkley received an associate degree in airframe and powerplant maintenance technology from the University of Alaska Fairbanks.

In 2005, Binkley left both his executive posts to prepare for a run for governor. He placed second in the Republican primary, with 30% of the vote, behind Sarah Palin.

Binkley was chosen to be one of three electors in the Electoral College on Alaska's behalf in the 2020 Presidential Election. He was chosen by the Republican Party, whose presidential candidate was incumbent President Donald Trump. Trump won Alaska.

He is married to Judy Gray Binkley, and they have four children. Binkley is a licensed boat captain and pilot, and enjoys and coaches hockey.

== Electoral history ==
2006 Republican primary for Alaska governor
Party	Candidate	Votes	%
Republican	Sarah Palin	51,443	50.59
Republican	John Binkley	30,349	29.84
Republican	Frank Murkowski (inc.)	19,412	19.09
Republican	Gerald Heikes	280	0.28
Republican	Merica Hlatcu	211	0.21
Total votes		101,695	100.00

Alaska House of Representatives
Preceded by Anthony N. Vaska	Member of the Alaska House of Representatives from the 25th district 1985–1987	Succeeded by Lyman Hoffman
Alaska Senate
Preceded by John C. Sackett	Member of the Alaska Senate from the M district 1987–1991	Succeeded by Lyman Hoffman
