= Clark Gruening =

American attorney and politician (1943–2025)

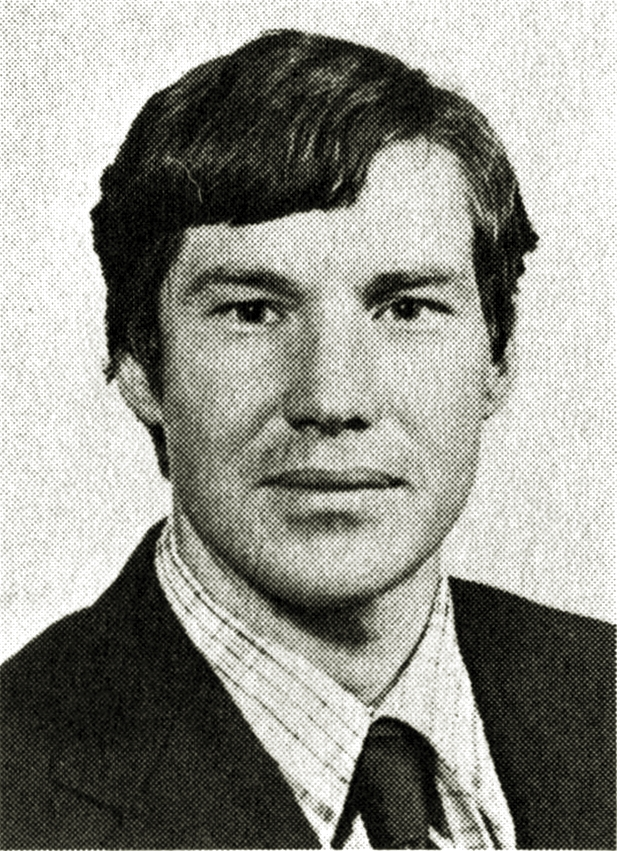
- Gruening in 1977

Member of the Alaska House of Representatives from the 7th district
- In office 1974–1978
- Succeeded by: William K. Parker

Personal details
- Born: March 28, 1943 San Francisco, California, US
- Died: June 17, 2025 (aged 82) Juneau, Alaska, U.S.
- Party: Democratic
- Relations: Ernest Gruening (grandfather)
- Education: University of Oregon (BA); George Washington University (JD)

Clark S. Gruening (/ˈɡriːnɪŋ/ GREEN-ing; March 28, 1943 – June 17, 2025) was an American attorney and Democratic Party politician from the U.S. state of Alaska. He is chiefly known as the second of three people to defeat the incumbent holder of Alaska's Class 3 United States Senate seat in the primary election.

== Life and career ==
Gruening was born in San Francisco on March 28, 1943, the son of Huntington Sanders "Hunt" Gruening, the second-born and (after 1955) last surviving son of Ernest Gruening, who at the time of Clark's birth was governor of the Territory of Alaska. Clark grew up in Juneau, Alaska, where his father was an airline pilot and executive. He graduated from Juneau-Douglas High School in 1961. He received a B.A. degree in political science from the University of Oregon in Eugene in 1965 and a J.D. degree from George Washington University in Washington, D.C. in 1969. He moved to Anchorage that year.

An attorney, Gruening was elected to two terms in the Alaska House of Representatives starting in 1974. In the 1980 U.S. Senate election in Alaska, he ran in the Democratic primary, defeating incumbent Senator Mike Gravel. In 1968, Gravel had defeated Clark's grandfather, Ernest Gruening, in the Democratic primary.

Both election results were attributed to Alaska's blanket primary system, which was brand-new in 1968 and eventually discontinued due to complaints by political parties that members of other parties had a hand in the selection of their party's nominees. Specifically, it was felt that Republicans and Frank Murkowski's supporters voted in large numbers for Gruening in hopes of eliminating Gravel. Extremely unpopular with Alaskan voters at the time, Gravel nonetheless was felt to pose a more serious challenge to Murkowski, largely on account of his incumbency. Gruening lost the 1980 general election to Murkowski.

Gruening died in Juneau on June 17, 2025, at the age of 82.

Party political offices
Preceded by Mike Gravel	Democratic nominee for U.S. Senator from Alaska (Class 3); 1980	Succeeded by Glenn Olds
