= 1980 United States Senate election in Alaska =

- November 4, 1980
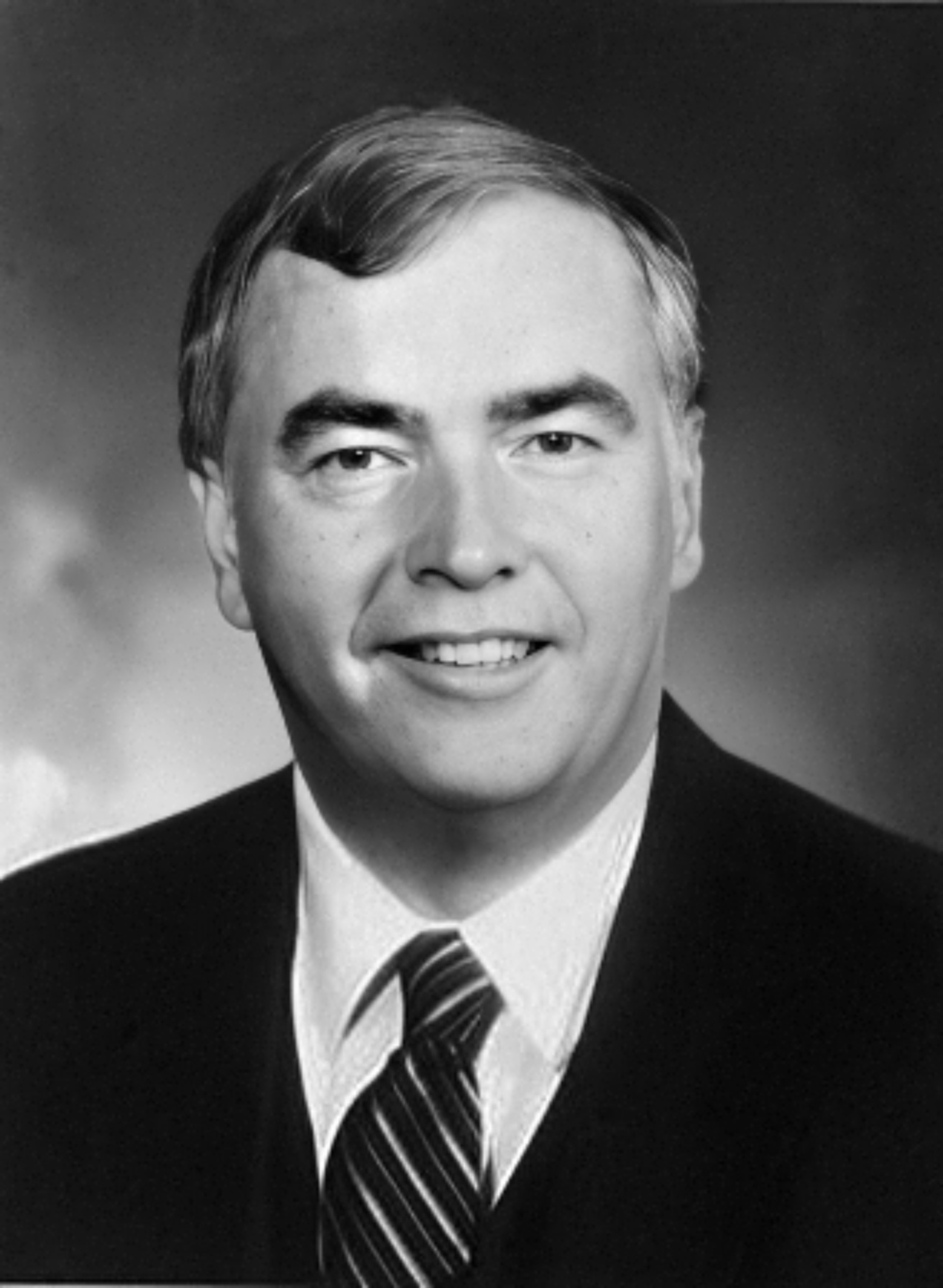

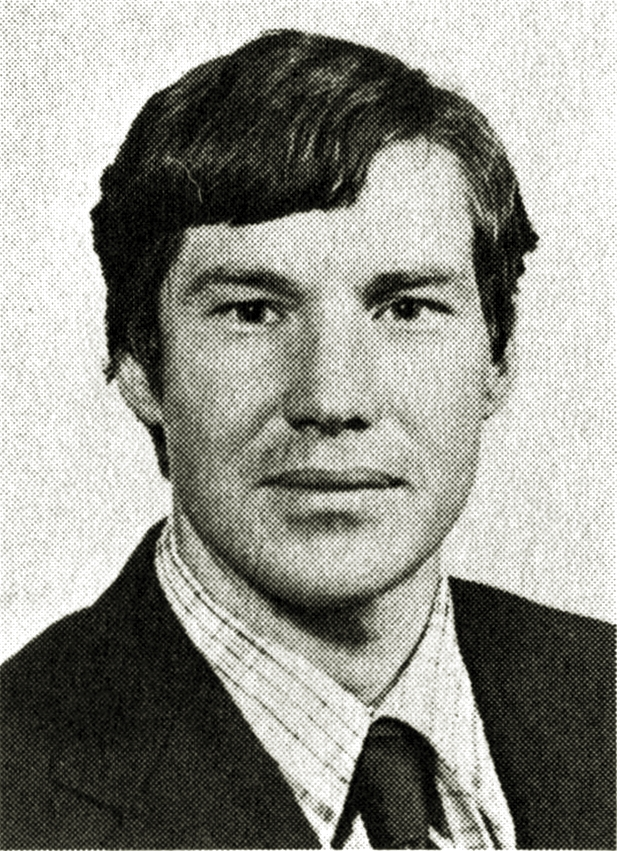
Nominee	Frank Murkowski	Clark Gruening
Party	Republican	Democratic
Popular vote	84,159	72,007
Percentage	53.69%	45.93%
- Results by state house district Murkowski: 50–60% 60–70% Gruening: 50–60% 60–70% 70–80%
U.S. senator before election
Mike Gravel
Democratic
Elected U.S. Senator
Frank Murkowski
Republican

The 1980 United States Senate election in Alaska was held on November 4, 1980. Incumbent Democratic United States Senator Mike Gravel ran for a third term in the United States Senate, but lost in the Democratic primary to Clark Gruening, a former state representative who was the grandson of Ernest Gruening, whom Gravel had defeated twelve years prior in an election for the same seat. Gruening later went on to lose the general election to Republican nominee Frank Murkowski, a banker. With Murkowski's victory, this marked the first time in history that Republicans held both of Alaska's Senate seats or that the state had an entirely Republican congressional delegation.

After the loss of Gravel's seat, no Alaska Democrat would win a federal race in Alaska until Mark Begich's narrow victory in Alaska's 2008 Senate election.

== Democratic primary ==
=== Candidates ===
- Clark Gruening, former Alaska State Representative
- Mike Gravel, incumbent United States Senator
- Michael J. Beasley, perennial candidate

=== Campaign ===
First elected in 1968, the two-term Democratic incumbent Mike Gravel had become known nationally for a filibuster that attempted to end the draft during the Vietnam War and for including the full text of the Pentagon Papers in the Congressional Record, an act which subsequently led to it being put out by a publishing house.

Gravel faced a challenging bid for reelection, complicated by the fact that his triumph over Ernest Gruening years prior had made him a pariah in the Alaska Democratic Party. Though Gravel had campaigned to be selected as George McGovern's running mate in the 1972 presidential election and had easily won reelection to the Senate in 1974, he had never established a strong political base in Alaska.

The passage of a controversial land bill earlier in the year, as opposed to a compromise bill worked out by fellow Senator Ted Stevens that failed thanks to Gravel two years earlier, further harmed his reelection bid. A group of Democrats, including future governor Steve Cowper, campaigned against Gravel on the land bill issue.

Gravel's campaign funds, some of which came from political action committees outside the state, also became an issue in the contest. Another factor may have been Alaska's blanket primary system, which allowed unlimited cross-over voting across parties and from its large unaffiliated electorate; Republicans believed Gruening would be an easier candidate to defeat in the general election. The blanket primary had first been used in the 1968 election, and was something Gravel himself was able to capitalize on that year.

Gravel later said that by the time of his primary defeat, he had alienated "almost every constituency in Alaska." In the August 26 primary Gruening defeated Gravel by 11 percentage points.

=== Results ===
Democratic primary results
Party	Candidate	Votes	%
Democratic	Clark Gruening	39,719	54.88%
Democratic	Mike Gravel (incumbent)	31,504	43.53%
Democratic	Michael J. Beasley	1,145	1.58%
Total votes		72,368	100.00%

== Republican primary ==
=== Candidates ===
==== Announced ====
- Frank Murkowski, president of the Alaska National Bank of the North and former Commissioner of Economic Development
- Art Kennedy, land manager
- Morris Thompson, former Bureau of Indian Affairs official
- Don Smith, Anchorage assemblyman
- Don Wright, former president of the Alaska Federation of Natives
- Dave Moe

==== Declined ====
- Tony Motley, former Commissioner for the Alaska Department of Commerce, Community and Economic Development

=== Results ===
Republican primary results
Party	Candidate	Votes	%
Republican	Frank Murkowski	16,262	58.92%
Republican	Art Kennedy	5,527	20.02%
Republican	Morris Thompson	3,635	13.17%
Republican	Don Smith	896	3.25%
Republican	Don Wright	824	2.99%
Republican	Dave Moe	458	1.66%
Total votes		27,602	100.00%

== General election ==
=== Results ===
United States Senate election in Alaska, 1980
Party	Candidate	Votes	%	±%
Republican	Frank Murkowski	84,159	53.69%	+11.97%
Democratic	Clark Gruening	72,007	45.93%	−12.35%
Write-in		596	0.38%	N/A
Total votes		156,762	100.00%	N/A
Republican gain from Democratic				

== See also ==
- 1980 United States Senate elections
