= Frank Murkowski =

American politician (born 1933)

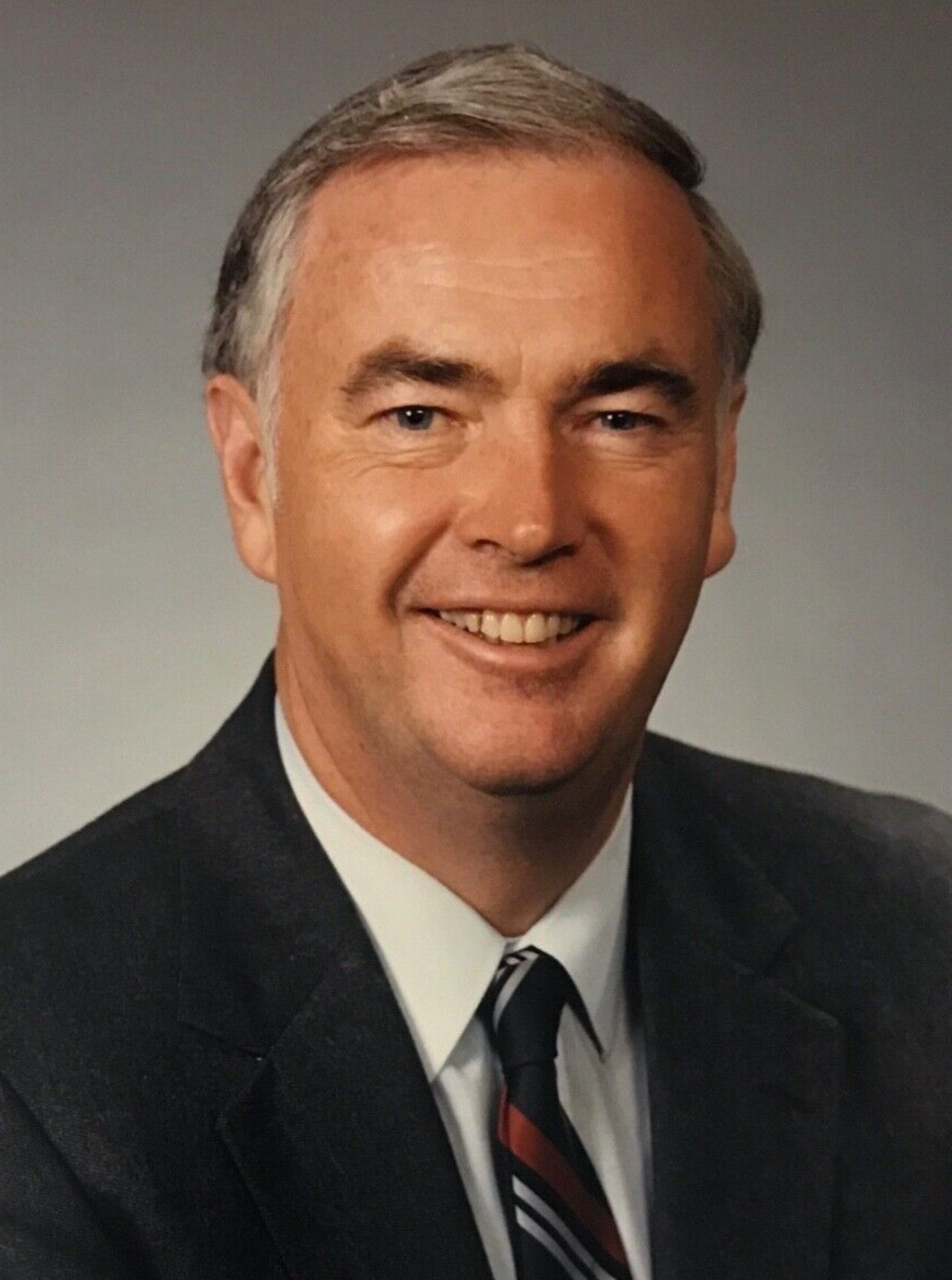
- Official portrait, 1992

8th Governor of Alaska
- In office December 2, 2002 – December 4, 2006
- Lieutenant: Loren Leman
- Preceded by: Tony Knowles
- Succeeded by: Sarah Palin

United States Senator from Alaska
- In office January 3, 1981 – December 2, 2002
- Preceded by: Mike Gravel
- Succeeded by: Lisa Murkowski

3rd Alaska Commissioner of Economic Development
- In office December 5, 1966 – December 7, 1970
- Governor: Wally Hickel; Keith Miller
- Preceded by: William Dickson
- Succeeded by: Everett Buness

Personal details
- Born: Frank Hughes Murkowski; March 28, 1933 (age 93) Seattle, Washington, U.S.
- Party: Republican
- Spouse: Nancy Gore (m. 1954)
- Children: 6, including Lisa
- Education: Santa Clara University (attended); Seattle University (BS)

Military service
- Allegiance: United States
- Branch: United States Coast Guard
- Service years: 1955–1957
- Murkowski's voice Murkowski on legislation to reform mining laws. Recorded March 8, 1995

Frank Hughes Murkowski (born March 28, 1933) is an American politician. A member of the Republican Party, he served as a United States senator representing Alaska from 1981 to 2002 and as the eighth governor of Alaska from 2002 to 2006.

Murkowski was the Republican nominee for Alaska's sole congressional district in 1970, but lost to his Democratic opponent Nick Begich. In 1980, he was elected to the United States Senate, and was reelected in 1986, 1992, and 1998.

Murkowski ran for governor of Alaska in 2002 to replace Democratic incumbent Tony Knowles. He defeated Lieutenant Governor Fran Ulmer in the general election and took office on December 2, 2002. Murkowski resigned his U.S. Senate seat before taking office and appointed his daughter, Lisa Murkowski, to replace him. In his 2006 re-election bid, he finished in third place in the Republican primary behind Sarah Palin and John Binkley. He is the oldest living former Republican governor of any state.

== Early life and education ==
Murkowski was born in Seattle, Washington, the son of Helen (née Hughes) and Frank M. Murkowski. His paternal grandfather was of Polish descent. Murkowski attended Ketchikan High School in Alaska, graduating in 1951. He studied at Santa Clara University from 1951 to 1953, and earned a BS in economics from Seattle University in 1955. He joined the United States Coast Guard in the summer of 1955 and served until 1957 – the year his daughter Lisa was born. He was stationed in Sitka and Ketchikan, Alaska, and aboard the cutters Sorrel and Thistle. Another daughter, Carol, is married to the son of State Sen. Arliss Sturgulewski, a former gubernatorial nominee.

== Career ==
After a stint at Pacific National Bank and further study at Pacific Coast Banking School, Murkowski became Alaska's youngest commissioner at the time when he was appointed Commissioner of Economic Development, aged 33, and was elevated to the presidency of the Alaska National Bank of the North in 1971. He has also headed the Alaska Bankers Association and – in 1977 - the Alaska State Chamber of Commerce.

He ran for Alaska's sole U.S. House seat in 1970, but was defeated in a landslide by Democratic state Senator Nick Begich.

=== U.S. Senate ===
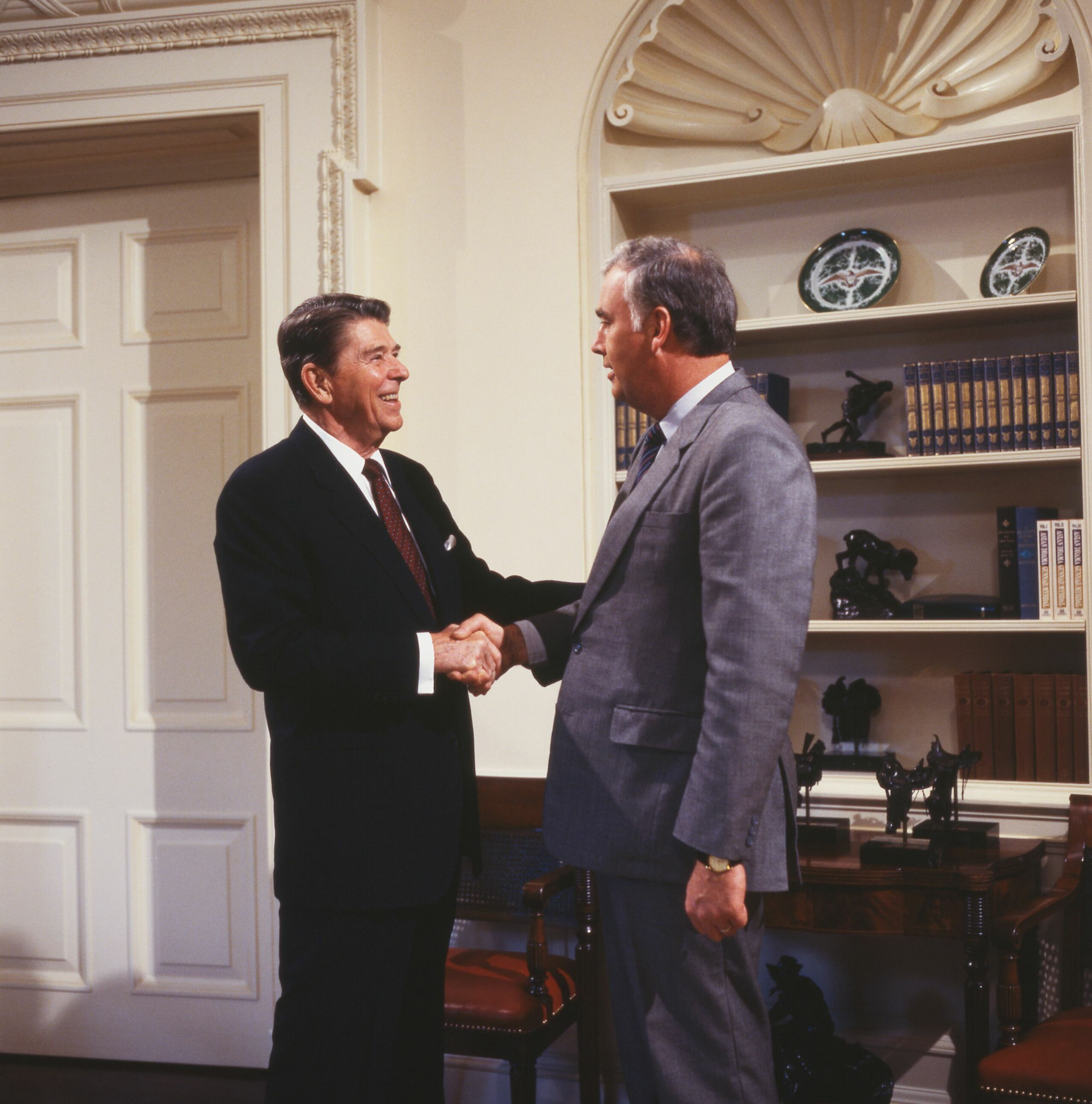
Murkowski with President Ronald Reagan in 1986

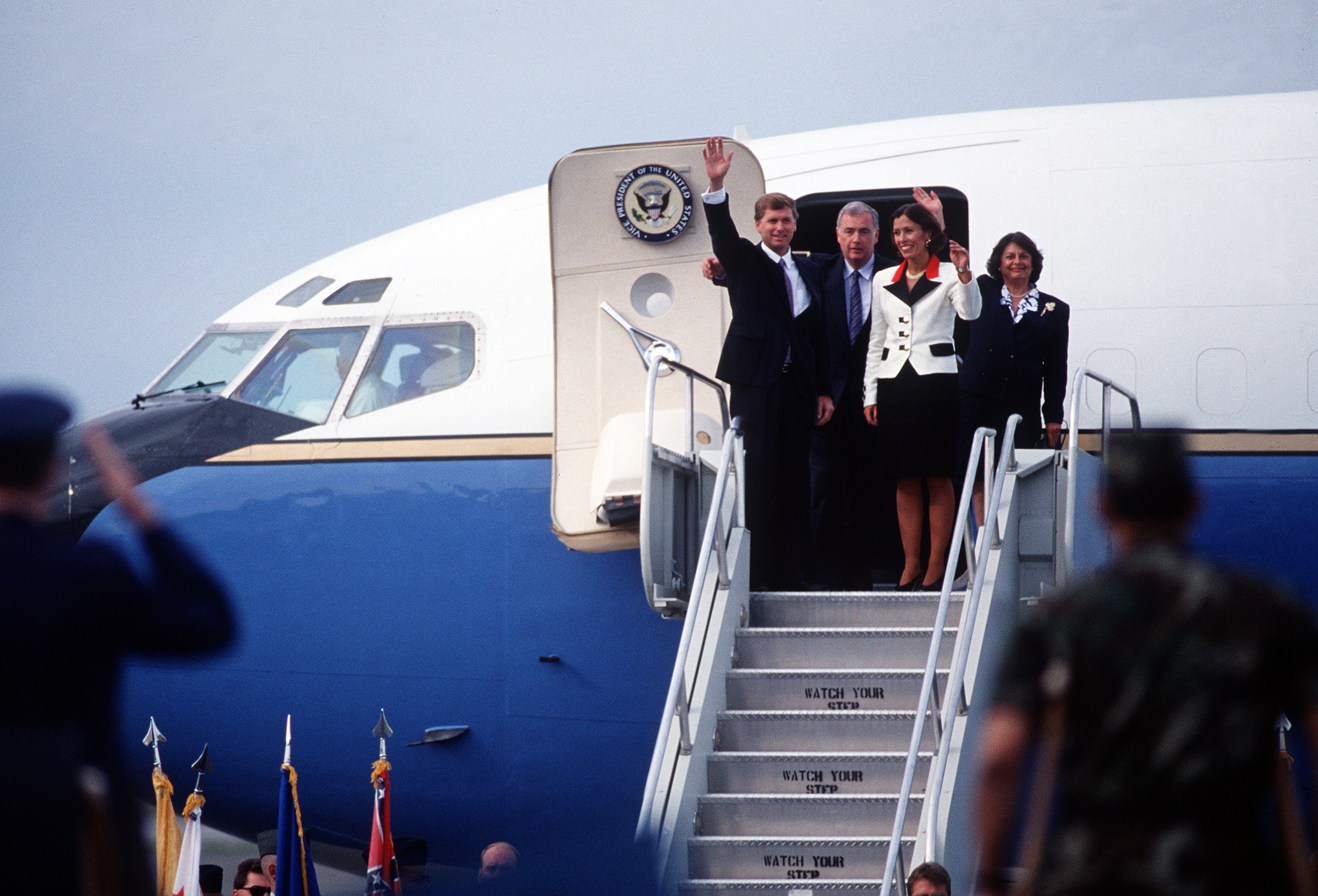
Murkowski and his wife stand behind Vice President Dan Quayle and Marilyn Quayle as they express their appreciation to airmen who served in the Persian Gulf area during Operation Desert Storm on May 18, 1991

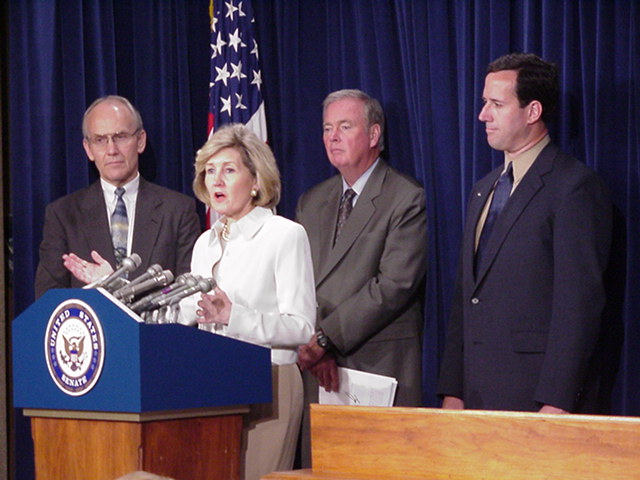
Murkowski with Rick Santorum, Larry Craig, and Kay Bailey Hutchison in 2001

He was first elected to the U.S. Senate in 1980, defeating Democratic candidate Clark Gruening, with the help of Ronald Reagan's popularity. He won with 54% of the vote. He was re-elected in 1986, 1992, and 1998. During his time in the Senate, he was most notable as Chairman of the Energy and Natural Resources Committee from 1995 to 2001. As chair, he argued and attempted unsuccessfully to open the Arctic National Wildlife Refuge to oil drilling.

Murkowski had an anti-abortion record in the Senate. He also opposed gun control and affirmative action.

In a floor statement in the Senate, regarding the ban of homosexuals serving in the military, Murkowski stated that homosexuals have a right to choose their lifestyle, but there exists no right to serve. In his opposition to lifting the ban, his speech focused on the cost effect on the Veterans Administration in treating service members infected with HIV. His daughter and successor in the Senate, Lisa Murkowski, voted to repeal the ban on homosexuals in the armed services, and later became the third Republican Senator to endorse the legalization of same-sex marriage while in office.

=== Governor ===
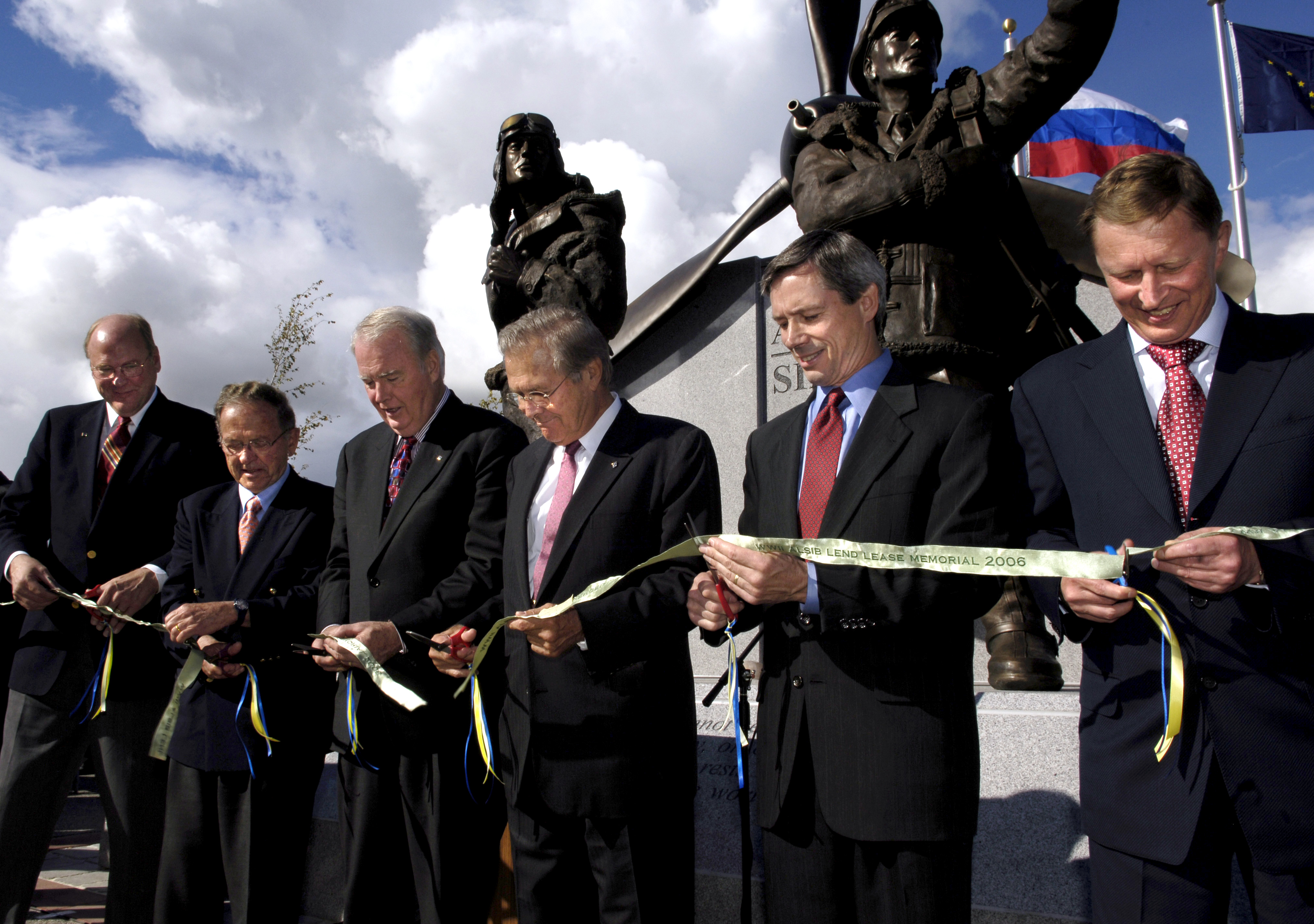
Murkowski, Senator Ted Stevens, Secretary Donald Rumsfeld, Russian Defense Minister Sergei Ivanov, State Senator Gary Wilken, and former State Senator John Binkley cut the ribbon dedicating a memorial to the Alaska-Siberia Lend Lease program in Fairbanks, Alaska on August 26, 2006

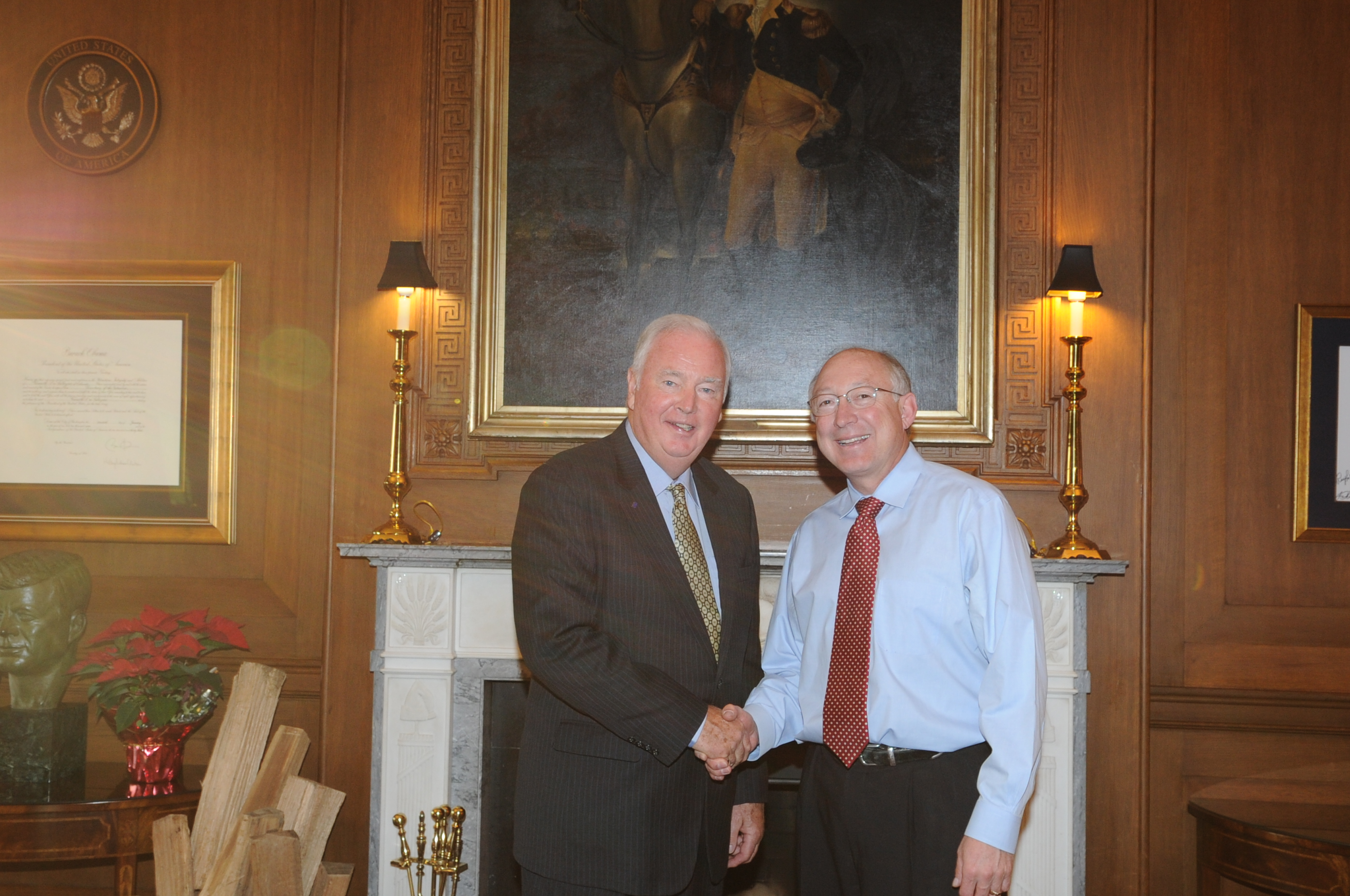
Murkowski with Interior Secretary Ken Salazar in 2011

Murkowski was elected governor on November 5, 2002, receiving nearly 56% of the vote, the highest percentage for any Republican gubernatorial nominee in Alaska history up until that point. He succeeded Democrat Tony Knowles and took office on December 2, 2002.

Upon his inauguration, he resigned his Senate seat and appointed his daughter, Lisa Murkowski, the Majority Leader-designate of the Alaska House of Representatives, in his place. The appointment was widely criticized as an act of nepotism.

Toward the end of his administration he brokered a deal for a gas pipeline that was never considered, in final form, by the legislature. Murkowski threatened to sign the deal without legislative approval, but the legislature successfully brought a lawsuit to enjoin him from doing so.

Governor Murkowski ran for re-election in 2006, but came in third behind former Wasilla Mayor Sarah Palin and businessman John Binkley in the Republican primary election on August 22, 2006 (Palin winning with 51% and Binkley taking second with 30% to Murkowski's 19%). Murkowski's margin of defeat was the largest in any Republican primary by an incumbent governor in United States history. Murkowski left office with one of the nation's worst approval ratings of 19%.

On March 4, 2008, Murkowski's former chief-of-staff, Jim Clark admitted that he was aware that Veco Corp had paid $10,000 for a political poll to gauge the popularity of then-incumbent Governor Murkowski. Clark was charged with "honest services fraud". Before he was sentenced, the US Supreme Court ruled that the statute was drafted with unconstitutional vagueness and henceforth will only cover "fraudulent schemes to deprive another of honest services through bribes or kickbacks supplied by a third party who ha[s] not been deceived." Since Clark was guilty of neither bribes nor kickbacks, all charges were voided.

In all 27 years of public service, Murkowski spent two years in the armed services, 21 years as Alaska's junior senator in D.C. and four years as governor.

Murkowski considered attempting a return to the governorship in the 2018 election, but ultimately decided against it.

==== Jet plane scandal ====
In 2005, despite opposition from the Alaska Legislature, Murkowski purchased a Westwind II jet with state money for $2.7 million. This purchase became the symbol of his unpopular legacy in state politics, so much so that his successor, Sarah Palin, promised to sell the jet once she became governor.

== Electoral history ==
- United States House of Representatives election in Alaska, 1970
  - Nick Begich (D), 55%
  - Frank Murkowski (R), 45%
- United States Senate election in Alaska, 1980
  - Frank Murkowski (R), 54%
  - Clark Gruening (D), 46%
- United States Senate election in Alaska, 1986
  - Frank Murkowski (R) (inc.), 54%
  - Glenn Olds (D), 44%
- United States Senate election in Alaska, 1992
  - Frank Murkowski (R) (inc.), 53%
  - Tony Smith (D), 38%
  - Mary Jordan (Grn.), 8%
- United States Senate election in Alaska, 1998
  - Frank Murkowski (R) (inc.), 75%
  - Joe Sonneman (D), 20%
- 2002 Alaska gubernatorial election
  - Frank Murkowski (R), 56%
  - Fran Ulmer (D), 41%
- 2006 Alaska gubernatorial election (Republican primary)
  - Sarah Palin (R), 51%
  - John Binkley (R), 30%
  - Frank Murkowski (R) (incumbent), 19%

Party political offices
Preceded by C. R. Lewis	Republican nominee for U.S. Senator from Alaska (Class 3); 1980, 1986, 1992, 1998	Succeeded by Lisa Murkowski
Preceded by John Lindauer; Disavowed	Republican nominee for Governor of Alaska; 2002	Succeeded by Sarah Palin
Preceded by Robin L. Taylor; Endorsed	Republican nominee for Governor of Alaska; 2002	Succeeded by Sarah Palin
U.S. Senate
Preceded by Mike Gravel	U.S. Senator (Class 3) from Alaska; 1981–2002; Served alongside: Ted Stevens	Succeeded by Lisa Murkowski
Preceded by Alan Simpson	Chair of the Senate Veterans' Affairs Committee; 1985–1987	Succeeded by Alan Cranston
Preceded by Alan Cranston	Ranking Member of the Senate Veterans' Affairs Committee; 1987–1991	Succeeded by Arlen Specter
Preceded by William Cohen	Vice Chair of the Senate Intelligence Committee; 1991–1993	Succeeded by John Warner
Preceded by Arlen Specter	Ranking Member of the Senate Veterans' Affairs Committee; 1993–1995	Succeeded by Jay Rockefeller
Preceded by J. Bennett Johnston	Chair of the Senate Energy Committee; 1995–2001	Succeeded by Jeff Bingaman
Preceded by Jeff Bingaman	Ranking Member of the Senate Energy Committee; 2001–2002	Succeeded by Jeff Bingaman
Political offices
Preceded by Tony Knowles	Governor of Alaska; 2002–2006	Succeeded by Sarah Palin
U.S. order of precedence (ceremonial)
Preceded by Kay Bailey Hutchison as Former U.S. Senator	Order of precedence of the United States as Former U.S. Senator	Succeeded by Bob Casey Jr. as Former U.S. Senator
